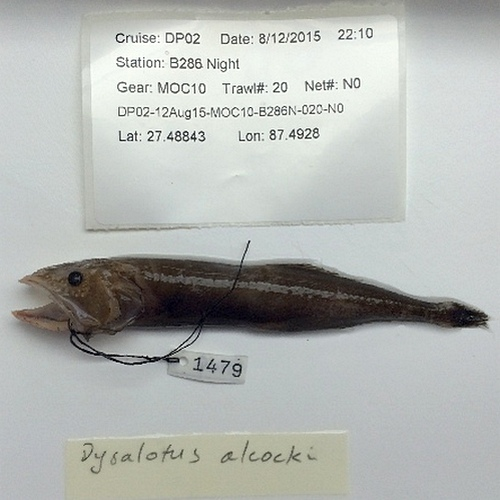

Conservation status
- Least Concern (IUCN 3.1)

Scientific classification
- Kingdom: Animalia
- Phylum: Chordata
- Class: Actinopterygii
- Order: Scombriformes
- Family: Chiasmodontidae
- Genus: Dysalotus
- Species: D. alcocki

Binomial name
- Dysalotus alcocki MacGilchrist, 1905

= Dysalotus alcocki =

Species of ray-finned fish

Dysalotus alcocki is a species of deep sea fish, a swallower, from the family Chiasmodontidae which is found in the tropical and temperate oceans around the world. The adults fed mainly on fish. The juveniles and larvae are most frequently recorded from shallower waters while adults are mostly caught from depths of over 1,000 metres (3,300 ft). The generic name is derived from the Greek dysalotos which means "difficult to catch" and the specific name honours the English zoologist Alfred William Alcock (1859-1933).
