= Pelagic fish =

Fish in the pelagic zone of ocean waters

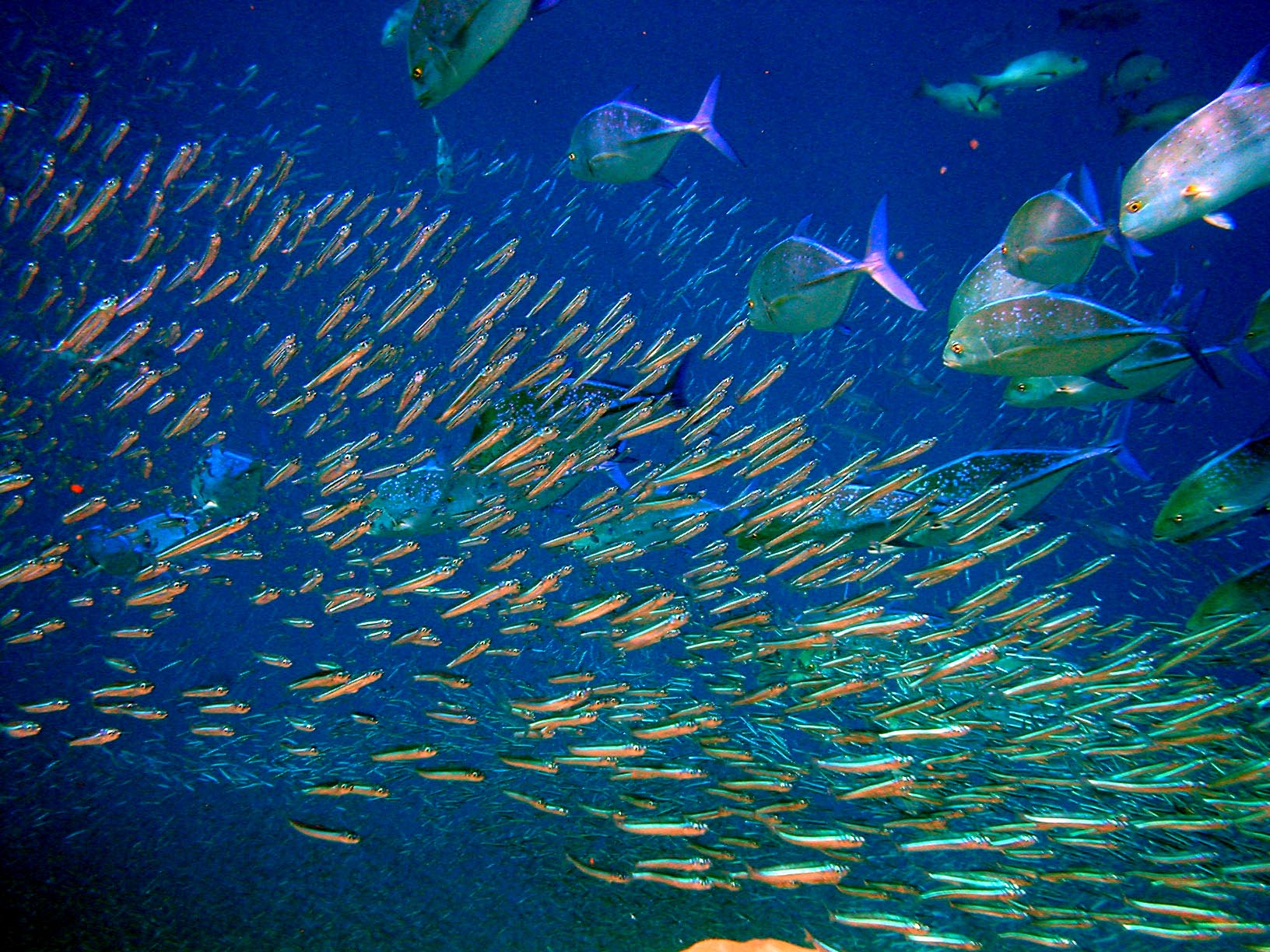
A school of large pelagic predator fish (bluefin trevally) sizing up a school of small pelagic prey fish (anchovies)

Pelagic fish live in the pelagic zone of ocean or lake waters—being neither close to the bottom nor near the shore—in contrast with demersal fish that live on or near the bottom, and reef fish that are associated with coral reefs.

The marine pelagic environment is the largest aquatic habitat on Earth, occupying 1,370 million cubic kilometres (330 million cubic miles), and is the habitat for 11% of known fish species. The oceans have a mean depth of 4,000 metres (2.5 miles). About 98% of the total water volume is below 100 metres (330 ft), and 75% is below 1,000 metres (3,300 ft).

Marine pelagic fish can be divided into coastal (inshore) fish and oceanic (offshore) fish. Coastal pelagic fish inhabit the relatively shallow and sunlit waters above the continental shelf, while oceanic pelagic fish inhabit the vast and deep waters beyond the continental shelf (even though they also may swim inshore).

Pelagic fish range in size from small coastal forage fish, such as herrings and sardines, to large apex predator oceanic fishes, such as bluefin tuna and oceanic sharks. They are usually agile swimmers with streamlined bodies, capable of sustained cruising on long-distance migrations. Many pelagic fish swim in schools weighing hundreds of tonnes. Others, such as the large ocean sunfish, are solitary. There are also freshwater pelagic fish in some of the larger lakes, such as the Lake Tanganyika sardine.

== Epipelagic fish ==
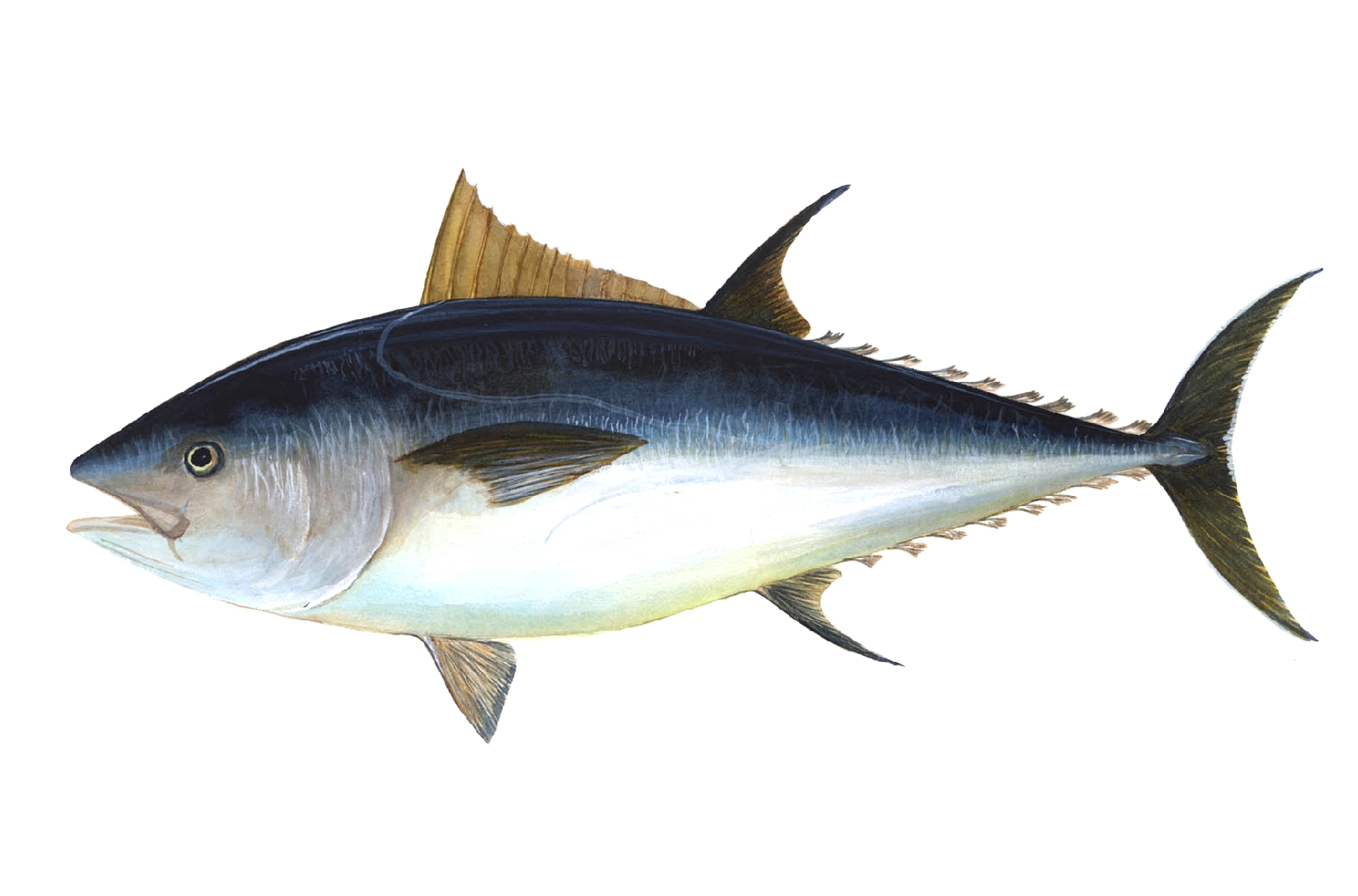
Large epipelagic predator fish, such as this Atlantic bluefin tuna, have a deeply forked tail and a smooth body shaped like a spindle tapered at both ends and countershaded with silvery colours.

Small epipelagic forage fish, such as this Atlantic herring, share similar body features as the predator fish described above.

Epipelagic fish inhabit the epipelagic zone, the uppermost layer of the water column, ranging from sea level down to 200 m (660 ft). It is also referred to as the surface waters or the sunlit zone, and includes the photic zone. The photic zone is defined as the surface waters down to the depth where the sunlight is attenuated to 1% of the surface value. This depth depends on how turbid the water is, but can extend to 200 m (660 ft) in clear water, coinciding with the epipelagic zone. The photic zone allows sufficient light for phytoplankton to photosynthesize.

A vast habitat for most pelagic fish, the epipelagic zone is well lit so visual predators can use their eyesight. It is usually well mixed and oxygenated from wave action, and can be a good habitat for algae to grow. However, it is an almost featureless habitat. This lack of habitat variation results in a lack of species diversity, so the zone supports less than 2% of the world's known fish species. Much of the zone lacks nutrients for supporting fish, so epipelagic fish tend to be found in coastal water above the continental shelves, where land runoff can provide nutrients, or in those parts of the ocean where upwelling moves nutrients into the area.

Epipelagic fish can be divided broadly into small forage fish and larger predator fish that feed on them. Forage fish school and filter feed on plankton. Most epipelagic fish have streamlined bodies capable of sustained cruising on migrations. In general, predatory and forage fish share the same morphological features. Predator fish are usually fusiform with large mouths, smooth bodies, and deeply forked tails. Many use vision to prey on zooplankton or smaller fish, while others filter feed on plankton.

Herring reflectors are nearly vertical for camouflage from the side.

Most epipelagic predator fish and their smaller prey fish are countershaded with silvery colours that reduce visibility by scattering incoming light. The silvering is achieved with reflective fish scales that function as small mirrors. This may give an effect of transparency. At medium depths at sea, light comes from above, so a mirror that is oriented vertically makes animals such as fish invisible from the side.

In the shallower epipelagic waters, the mirrors must reflect a mixture of wavelengths, and the fish accordingly, has crystal stacks with a range of different spacings. A further complication for fish with bodies that are rounded in cross-section is that the mirrors would be ineffective if laid flat on the skin, as they would fail to reflect horizontally. The overall mirror effect is achieved with many small reflectors, all oriented vertically.

Although the number of species is limited, epipelagic fishes are abundant. What they lack in diversity they make up for in numbers. Forage fish occur in huge numbers, and large fish that prey on them often are sought after as premier food fish. As a group, epipelagic fishes form the most valuable fisheries in the world.

Many forage fish are facultative predators that can pick individual copepods or fish larvae out of the water column, and then change to filter feeding on phytoplankton when that gives better results energetically. Filter feeding fish usually use long fine gill rakers to strain small organisms from the water column. Some of the largest epipelagic fishes, such as the basking shark and whale shark, are filter feeders, and so are some of the smallest, such as adult sprats and anchovies.

Ocean waters that are exceptionally clear contain little food. Areas of high productivity tend to be somewhat turbid from plankton blooms. These attract the filter feeding plankton eaters, which in turn attract the higher predators. Tuna fishing tends to be optimum when water turbidity, measured by the maximum depth a secchi disc can be seen during a sunny day, is 15 to 35 metres.

=== Floating objects ===
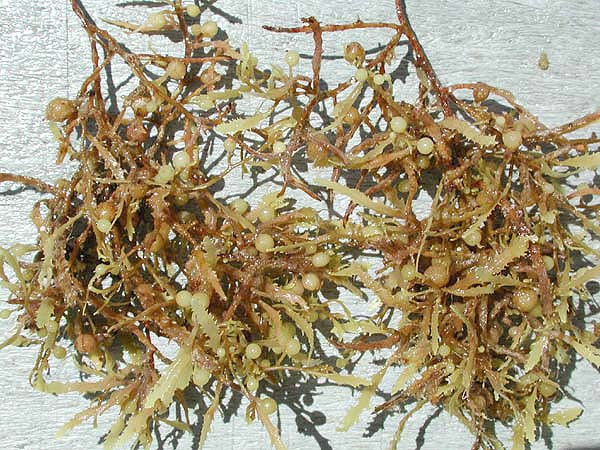
Drifting Sargassum seaweed provides food and shelter for small epipelagic fish. The small round spheres are floats filled with carbon dioxide which provide buoyancy to the algae.

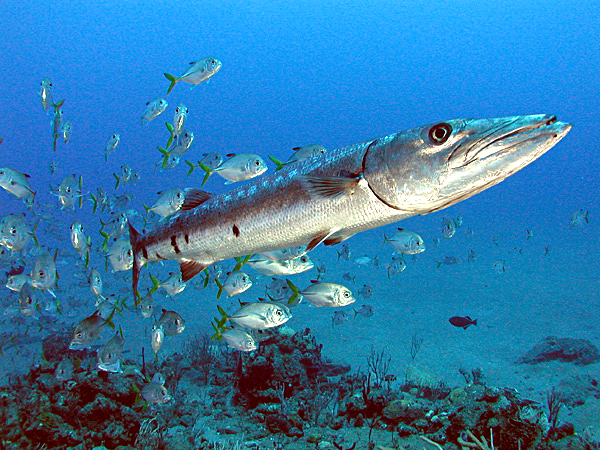
Great barracuda accompanied by a school of jacks

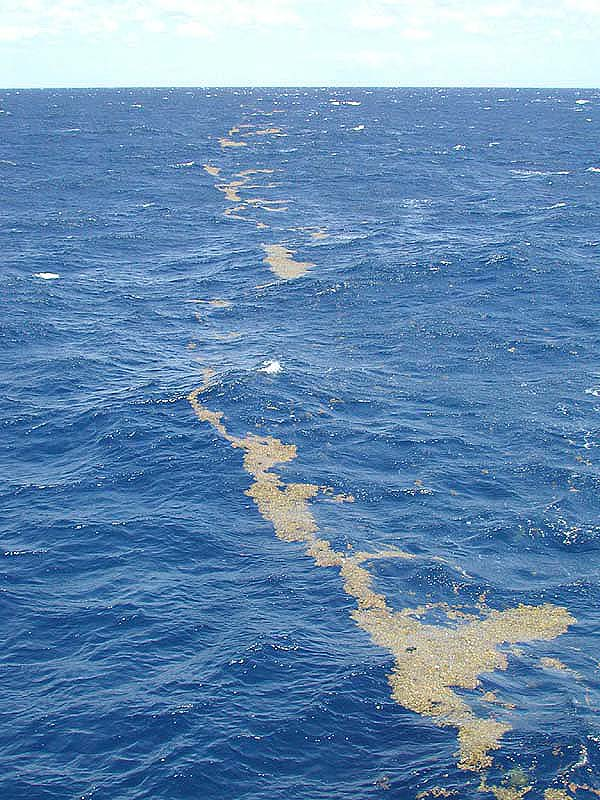
Lines of Sargassum can stretch for miles along the ocean surface.

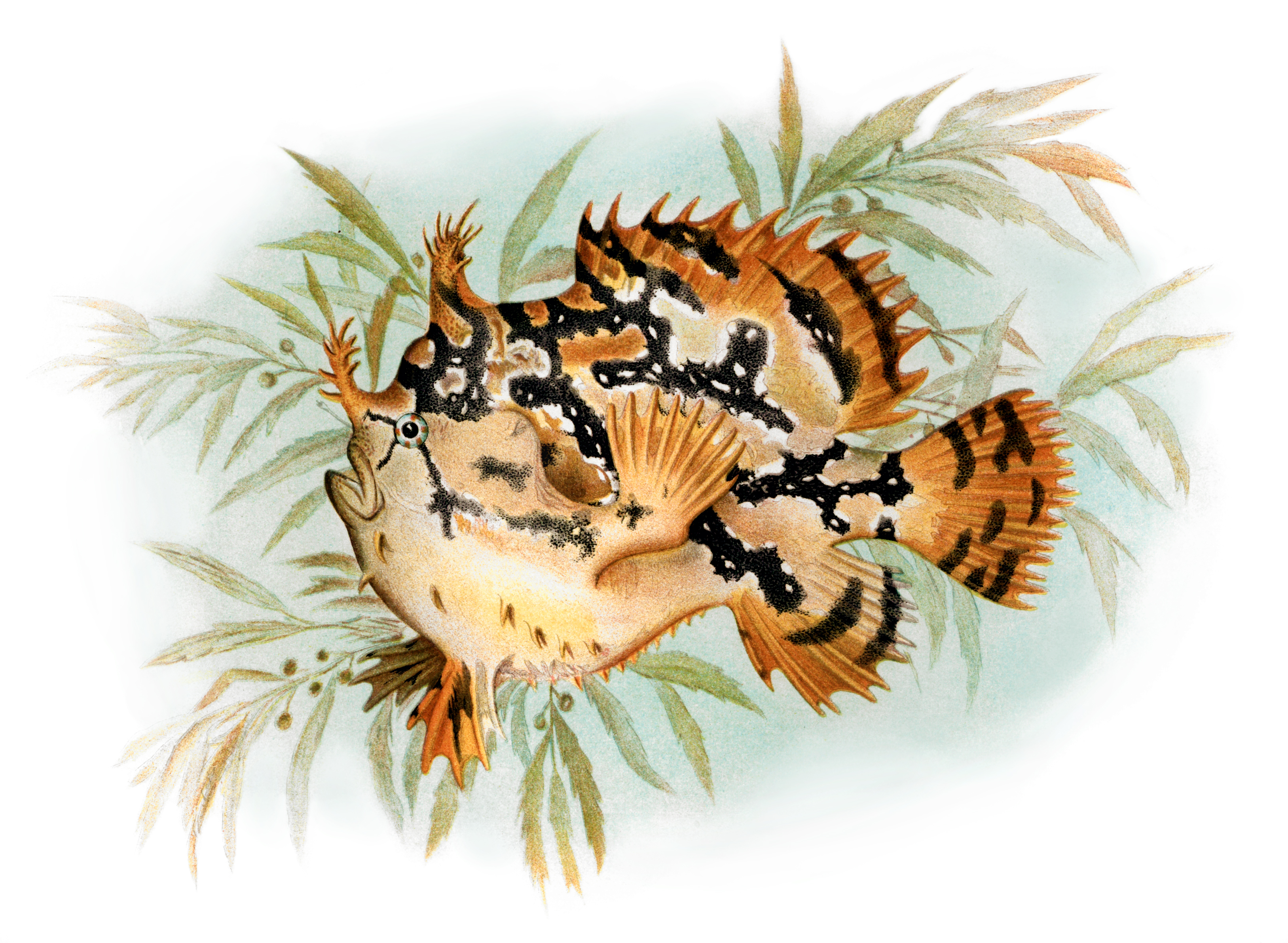
The camouflaged sargassum fish has evolved to live among drifting Sargassum seaweed.

Epipelagic fish are fascinated by floating objects. They aggregate in considerable numbers around objects such as drifting flotsam, rafts, jellyfish, and floating seaweed. The objects appear to provide a "visual stimulus in an optical void". Floating objects may offer refuge for juvenile fish from predators. An abundance of drifting seaweed or jellyfish can result in significant increases in the survival rates of some juvenile species.

Many coastal juveniles use seaweed for the shelter and the food that is available from invertebrates and other fish associated with it. Drifting seaweed, particularly the pelagic Sargassum, provide a niche habitat with its own shelter and food, and even supports its own unique fauna, such as the sargassum fish. One study, off Florida, found 54 species from 23 families living in flotsam from Sargassum mats. Jellyfish also are used by juvenile fish for shelter and food, even though jellyfish can prey on small fish.

Mobile oceanic species such as tuna can be captured by travelling long distances in large fishing vessels. A simpler alternative is to leverage off the fascination fish have with floating objects. When fishermen use such objects, they are called fish aggregating devices (FADs). FADs are anchored rafts or objects of any type, floating on the surface or just below it. Fishermen in the Pacific and Indian oceans set up floating FADs, assembled from all sorts of debris, around tropical islands, and then use purse seines to capture the fish attracted to them.

A study using sonar in French Polynesia, found large shoals of juvenile bigeye tuna and yellowfin tuna aggregated closest to the devices, 10 to 50 m. Farther out, 50 to 150 m, was a less dense group of larger yellowfin and albacore tuna. Yet farther out, to 500 m, was a dispersed group of various large adult tuna. The distribution and density of these groups was variable and overlapped. The FADs also were used by other fish, and the aggregations dispersed when it was dark.

Larger fish, even predator fish such as the great barracuda, often attract a retinue of small fish that accompany them in a strategically safe way. Skindivers who remain for long periods in the water also often attract a retinue of fish, with smaller fishes coming in close and larger fishes observing from a greater distance. Marine turtles, functioning as a mobile shelter for small fish, can be impaled accidentally by a swordfish trying to catch the fish.

=== Coastal fish ===
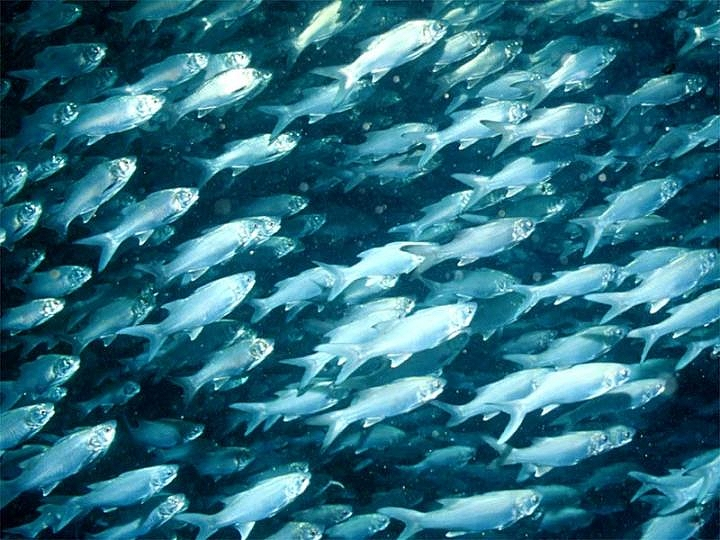
Schooling threadfin, a coastal species

Coastal fish (also called neritic or inshore fish) inhabit the waters near the coast and above the continental shelf. Since the continental shelf is usually less than 200 metres deep, it follows that coastal fish that are not demersal fish, are usually epipelagic fish, inhabiting the sunlit epipelagic zone.

Coastal epipelagic fish are among the most abundant in the world. They include forage fish as well as the predator fish that feed on them. Forage fish thrive in those inshore waters where high productivity results from the upwelling and shoreline run off of nutrients. Some are partial residents that spawn in streams, estuaries, and bays, but most complete their life cycle in the zone.

== Oceanic fish ==
Oceanic fish inhabit the oceanic zone, which is the deep open water which lies beyond the continental shelves.

Oceanic fish (also called open ocean or offshore fish) live in the waters that are not above the continental shelf. Oceanic fish can be contrasted with coastal fish, who do live above the continental shelf. However, the two types are not mutually exclusive, since there are no firm boundaries between coastal and ocean regions, and many epipelagic fish move between coastal and oceanic waters, particularly in different stages in their life cycle.

Oceanic epipelagic fish can be true residents, partial residents, or accidental residents. True residents live their entire life in the open ocean. Only a few species are true residents, such as tuna, billfish, flying fish, sauries, pilotfish, remoras, dolphinfish, ocean sharks, and ocean sunfish. Most of these species migrate back and forth across open oceans, rarely venturing over continental shelves. Some true residents associate with drifting jellyfish or seaweeds.

Partial residents occur in three groups: species that live in the zone only when they are juveniles (drifting with jellyfish and seaweeds); species that live in the zone only when they are adults (salmon, flying fish, dolphin, and whale sharks); and deep water species that make nightly migrations up into the surface waters (such as the lanternfish). Accidental residents occur occasionally when adults and juveniles of species from other environments are carried accidentally into the zone by currents.

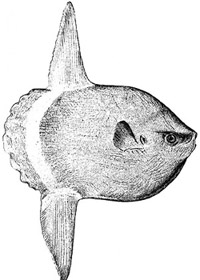
The huge ocean sunfish, a true resident of the ocean epipelagic zone, sometimes drifts with the current, eating jellyfish.

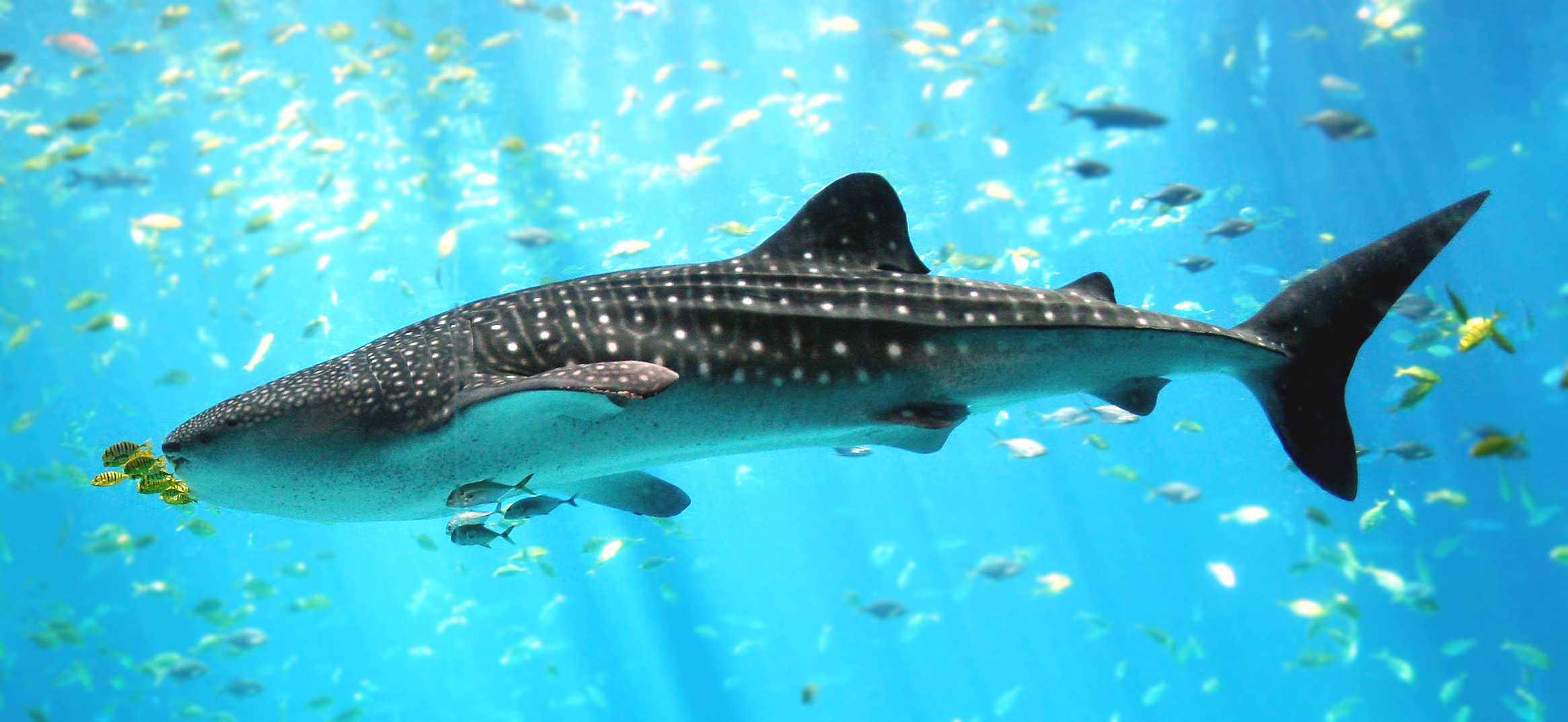
The giant whale shark, another resident of the ocean epipelagic zone, filter feeds on plankton, and periodically dives deep into the mesopelagic zone.

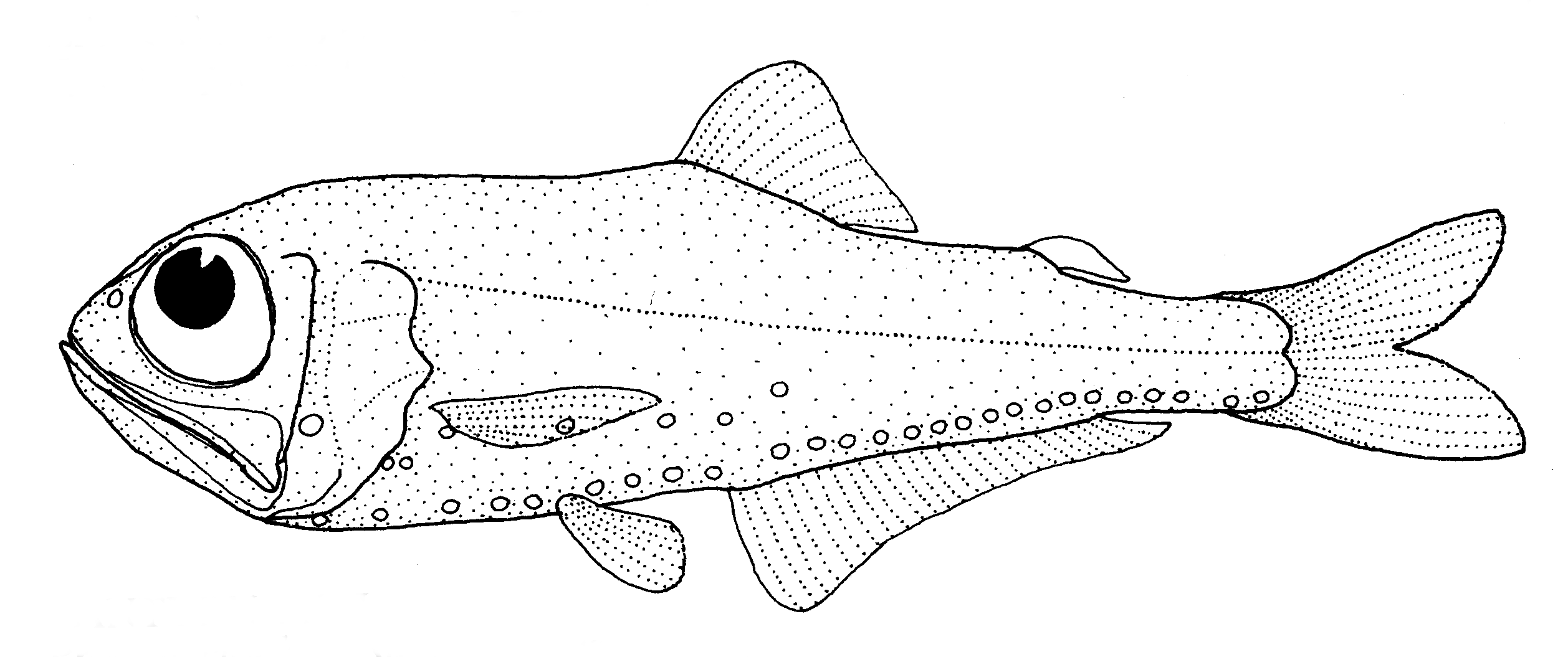
Lanternfish are partial residents of the ocean epipelagic zone During the day they hide in deep waters, but at night they migrate up to surface waters to feed.

=== Deep water fish ===
Scale diagram of the layers of the pelagic zone

In the deep ocean, the waters extend far below the epipelagic zone and support very different types of pelagic fishes adapted to living in these deeper zones.

In deep water, marine snow is a continuous shower of mostly organic detritus falling from the upper layers of the water column. Its origin lies in activities within the productive photic zone. Marine snow includes dead or dying plankton, protists (diatoms), fecal matter, sand, soot, and other inorganic dust. The "snowflakes" grow over time and may reach several centimetres in diameter, travelling for weeks before reaching the ocean floor. However, most organic components of marine snow are consumed by microbes, zooplankton, and other filter feeding animals within the first 1,000 metres of their journey, that is, within the epipelagic zone. In this way marine snow can be considered the foundation of deep-sea mesopelagic and benthic ecosystems: As sunlight cannot reach them, deep-sea organisms rely heavily on marine snow as an energy source.

Some deep-sea pelagic groups, such as the lanternfish, ridgehead, marine hatchetfish, and lightfish families are sometimes termed pseudoceanic because, rather than having an even distribution in open water, they occur in significantly higher abundances around structural oases, notably seamounts, and over continental slopes. The phenomenon is explained by the likewise abundance of prey species that also are attracted to the structures.

The fish in the different pelagic and deep water benthic zones are physically structured, and behave, in ways that differ markedly from each other. Groups of coexisting species within each zone all seem to operate in similar ways, such as the small mesopelagic vertically migrating plankton-feeders, the bathypelagic anglerfishes, and the deep water benthic rattails.

Ray finned species, with spiny fins, are rare among deep sea fishes, which suggests that deep sea fish are ancient and so well adapted to their environment that invasions by more modern fishes have been unsuccessful. The few ray fins that do exist are mainly in the Beryciformes and Lampriformes, which also are ancient forms. Most deep sea pelagic fishes belong to their own orders, suggesting a long evolution in deep sea environments. In contrast, deep water benthic species are in orders that include many related shallow water fishes.

Many species move daily between zones in vertical migrations. In the following table, they are listed in the middle or deeper zone where they regularly are found.

Species by pelagic zone
Zone	Species and species groups include:
Epipelagic	mackerel, requiem and whale sharks; clupeiforms – herring, anchovy; Salmonidae – salmon; atheriniforms – flyingfishes, halfbeaks, sauries; perciforms – jacks, dolphinfish, pomfrets, barracudas, tunas, billfish.
Mesopelagic	Lanternfish, opah, longnose lancetfish, barreleye, ridgehead, sabretooth, stoplight loosejaw, marine hatchetfish
Bathypelagic	Principally bristlemouth and anglerfish. Also fangtooth, viperfish, black swallower, telescopefish, hammerjaw, daggertooth, barracudina, black scabbardfish, bobtail snipe eel, unicorn crestfish, gulper eel, flabby whalefish.
Benthopelagic	Rattail and brotula are particularly abundant.
Benthic	Flatfish, hagfish, eelpout, greeneye eel, stingray, lumpfish, and batfish

Comparative structure of pelagic fishes
	Epipelagic	Mesopelagic	Bathypelagic	Deep sea benthic
muscles		muscular bodies	poorly developed, flabby	
skeleton		strong, ossified bones	weak, minimal ossification	
scales		yes	none	
nervous systems		well developed	lateral line and olfactory only	
eyes		large and sensitive	small and may not function	variable (well developed to absent)
photophores	absent	common	common	usually absent
gills		well developed		
kidneys		large	small	
heart		large	small	
swimbladder		vertically migratory fish have swimbladders	reduced or absent	variable (well developed to absent)
size			usually under 25 cm	variable, species greater than one metre are not uncommon

=== Mesopelagic fish ===
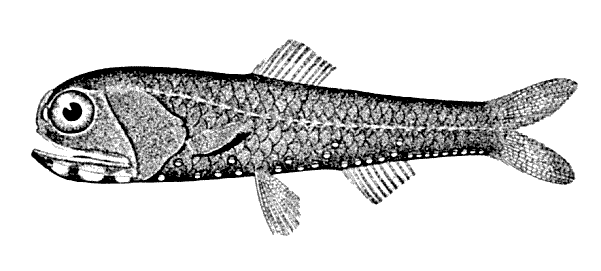
Most mesopelagic fishes are small filter feeders that ascend at night to feed in the nutrient rich waters of the epipelagic zone. During the day, they return to the dark, cold, oxygen-deficient waters of the mesopelagic where they are relatively safe from predators. Lanternfish account for as much as 65% of all deep sea fish biomass and are largely responsible for the deep scattering layer of the world's oceans.

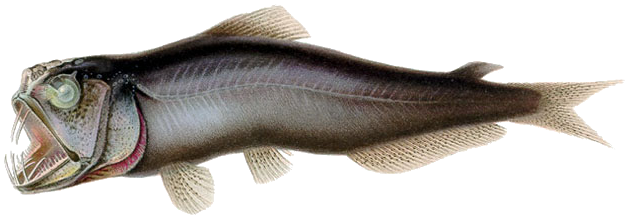
Most of the rest of the mesopelagic fishes are ambush predators, such as this sabertooth fish. The sabertooth uses its telescopic, upward-pointing eyes to pick out prey silhouetted against the gloom above. Their recurved teeth prevent a captured fish from backing out.

Below the epipelagic zone, conditions change rapidly. Between 200 metres and approximately 1000 metres, light continues to fade until darkness is nearly complete. Temperatures fall through a thermocline to temperatures between 4 °C (39 °F) and 8 °C (46 °F). This is the twilight or mesopelagic zone. Pressure continues to increase, at the rate of one atmosphere every 10 metres, while nutrient concentrations fall, along with dissolved oxygen and the rate at which the water circulates.

Sonar operators, using the sonar technology developed during World War II, were puzzled by what appeared to be a false sea floor 300–500 metres deep at day, and less deep at night. This turned out to be due to millions of marine organisms, most particularly small mesopelagic fish, with swimbladders that reflected the sonar.

Mesopelagic organisms migrate into shallower water at dusk to feed on plankton. The layer is deeper when the moon is out, and may move higher when the sky is dark. This phenomenon has come to be known as the deep scattering layer.

Most mesopelagic fish make daily vertical migrations, moving each night into the epipelagic zone, often following similar migrations of zooplankton, and returning to the depths for safety during the day. These vertical migrations occur over hundreds of meters.

These fish have muscular bodies, ossified bones, scales, well developed gills and central nervous systems, and large hearts and kidneys. Mesopelagic plankton feeders have small mouths with fine gill rakers, while the piscivores have larger mouths and coarser gill rakers.

Vertically migratory fish have swimbladders. The fish inflates its swimbladder to move up. Given the high pressures in the mesopelagic zone, this requires significant energy. As the fish ascends, the air in the swimbladder must decrease to prevent the swimbladder from bursting. To return to the depths, the swimbladder is deflated. The migration takes them through the thermocline, where the temperature changes between 10 and 20 °C, thus displaying considerable temperature tolerance.

Mesopelagic fish are adapted for an active life under low light conditions. Most of them are visual predators with large eyes. Some of the deeper water fish such as the Telescopefish have tubular eyes with big lenses and only rod cells that look upward. These give binocular vision and great sensitivity to small light signals. This adaptation gives improved terminal vision at the expense of lateral vision, and allows the predator to pick out squid, cuttlefish, and smaller fish that are silhouetted above them.

Mesopelagic fish usually lack defensive spines, and use colour for camouflage. Ambush predators are dark, black or red. Since the longer, red, wavelengths of light do not reach the deep sea, red effectively functions the same as black. Migratory forms use countershaded silvery colours. On their bellies, they often display photophores producing low grade light. For a predator from below, looking upward, this bioluminescence camouflages the silhouette of the fish. However, some of these predators have yellow lenses that filter the (red deficient) ambient light, leaving the bioluminescence visible.

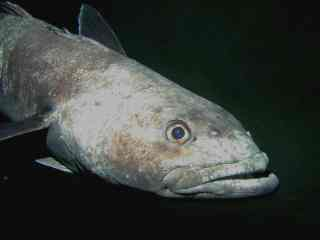
The Antarctic toothfish have large, upward looking eyes, adapted to detecting the silhouettes of prey fish.

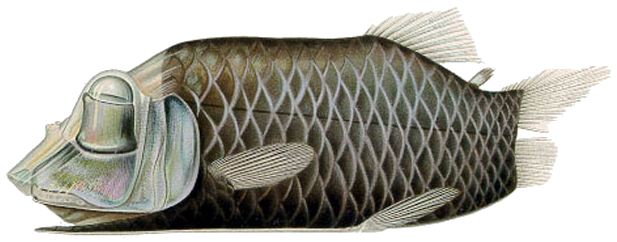
The Barreleye has barrel-shaped, tubular eyes that generally are directed upward, but may be swivelled forward.

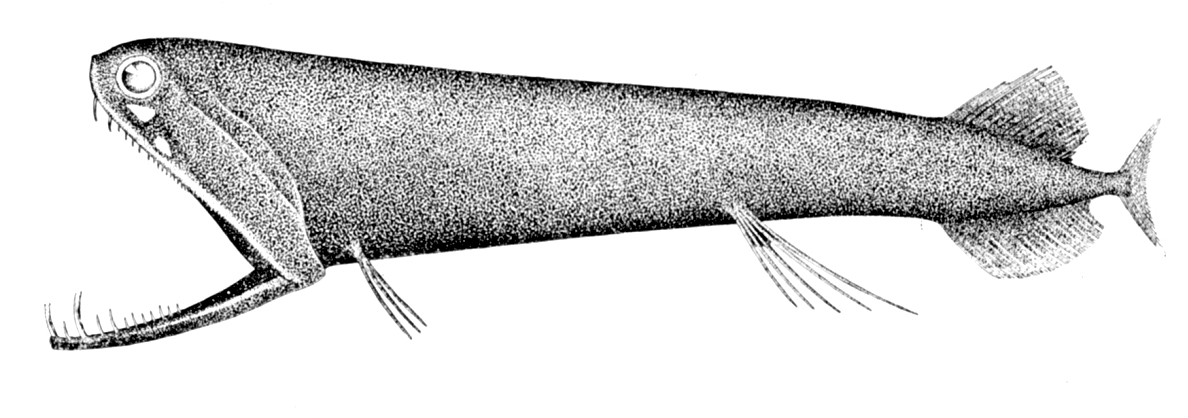
The stoplight loosejaw has a lower jaw one-quarter as long as its body. The jaw has no floor and is attached only by a hinge and a modified tongue bone. Large fang-like teeth in the front are followed by many small barbed teeth.

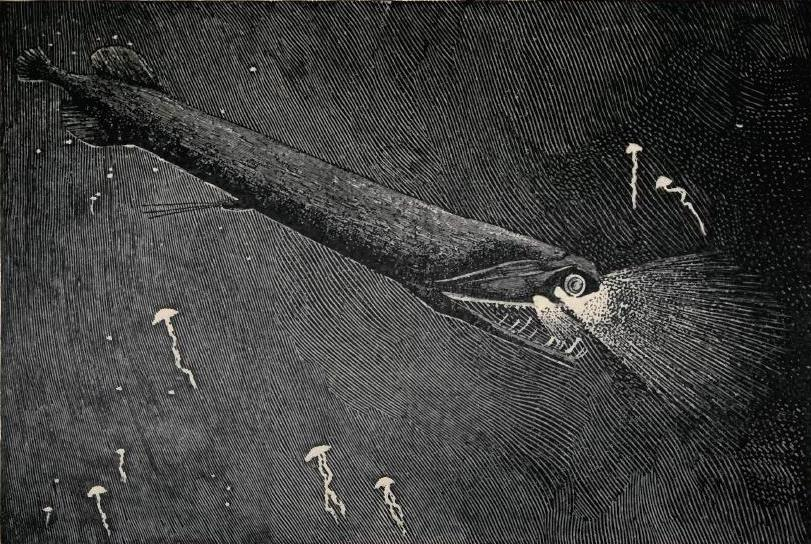
The stoplight loosejaw is also one of the few fishes that produce red bioluminescence. As most of their prey cannot perceive red light, this allows it to hunt with an essentially invisible beam of light.

The brownsnout spookfish is a species of barreleye and is the only vertebrate known to employ a mirror, as opposed to a lens, to focus an image in its eyes.

Sampling via deep trawling indicates that lanternfish account for as much as 65% of all deep sea fish biomass. Indeed, lanternfish are among the most widely distributed, populous, and diverse of all vertebrates, playing an important ecological role as prey for larger organisms. The estimated global biomass of lanternfish is 550–660 million tonnes, several times the entire world fisheries catch. Lanternfish also account for much of the biomass responsible for the deep scattering layer of the world's oceans. Sonar reflects off the millions of lanternfish swim bladders, giving the appearance of a false bottom.

The 2010 Malaspina Circumnavigation Expedition traveled 60,000 km, undertaking acoustic observations. It reported that mesopelagic biomass was 10 billion tonnes or more (10x prior estimates), comprising about 90 percent of all ocean fish biomass. Estimates of how much carbon these fish sequester remained highly uncertain as of 2024.

Mesopelagic fish do not constitute a major fishery as of 2024. Initial efforts in Iceland, Norway, and the Soviet Union did not create a commercial industry. The European Union funded the MEESO project to study abundance and fishing technologies for key mesopelagic species. To date, fish that appeal to the human palate have not been identified, leading harvesters to focus on animal feed markets instead.

Bigeye tuna are an epipelagic/mesopelagic species that is carnivorous, eating other fish. Satellite tagging has shown that bigeye tuna often spend prolonged periods cruising deep below the surface during the daytime, sometimes making dives as deep as 500 metres (1,600 feet). These movements are thought to be in response to the vertical migrations of prey organisms in the deep scattering layer.

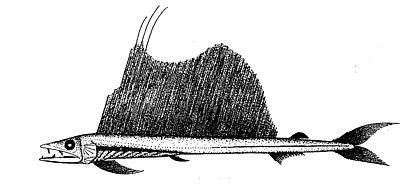
Longnose lancetfish. Lancetfish are ambush predators that frequent the mesopelagic. They are among the largest mesopelagic fishes (up to 2 metres).

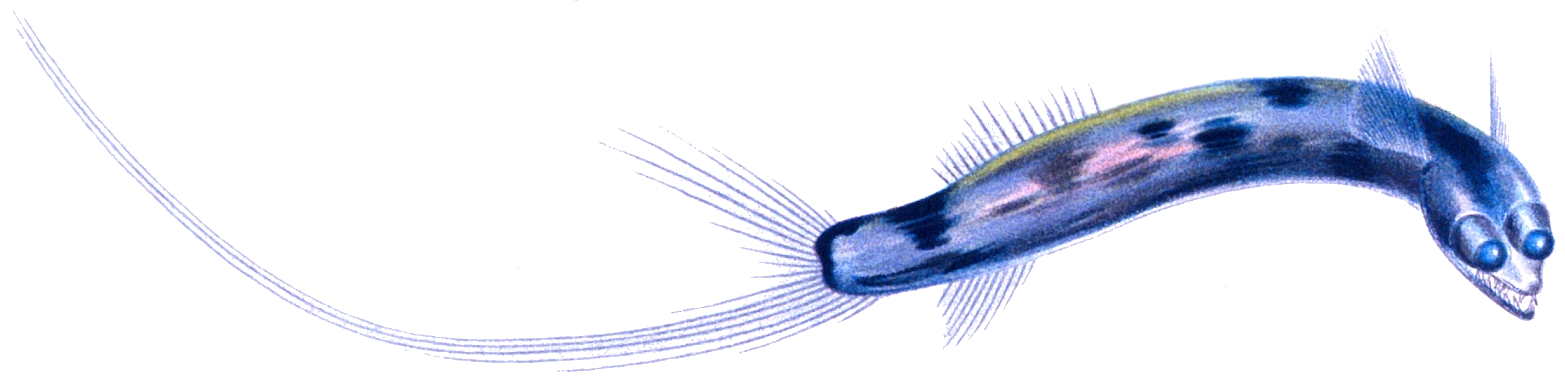
The telescopefish has large, forward-pointing telescoping eyes with large lenses.

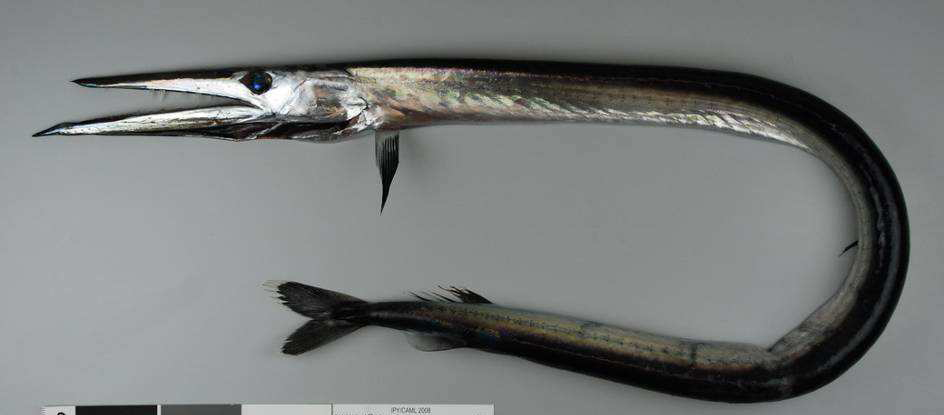
The daggertooth slashes other mesopelagic fish when it bites them with its dagger-like teeth.

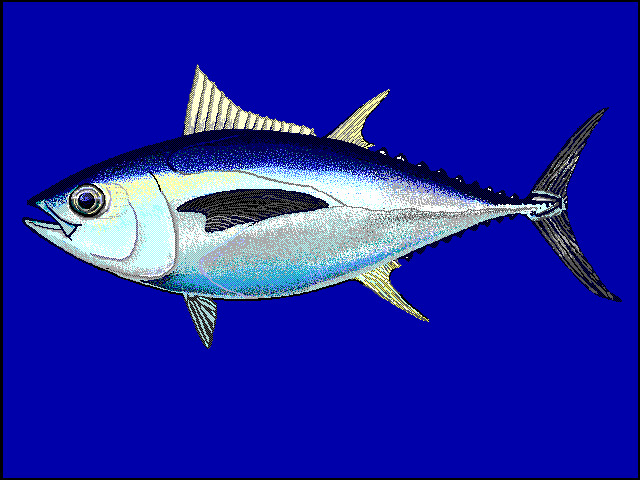
Bigeye tuna cruise the epipelagic zone at night and the mesopelagic zone during the day.

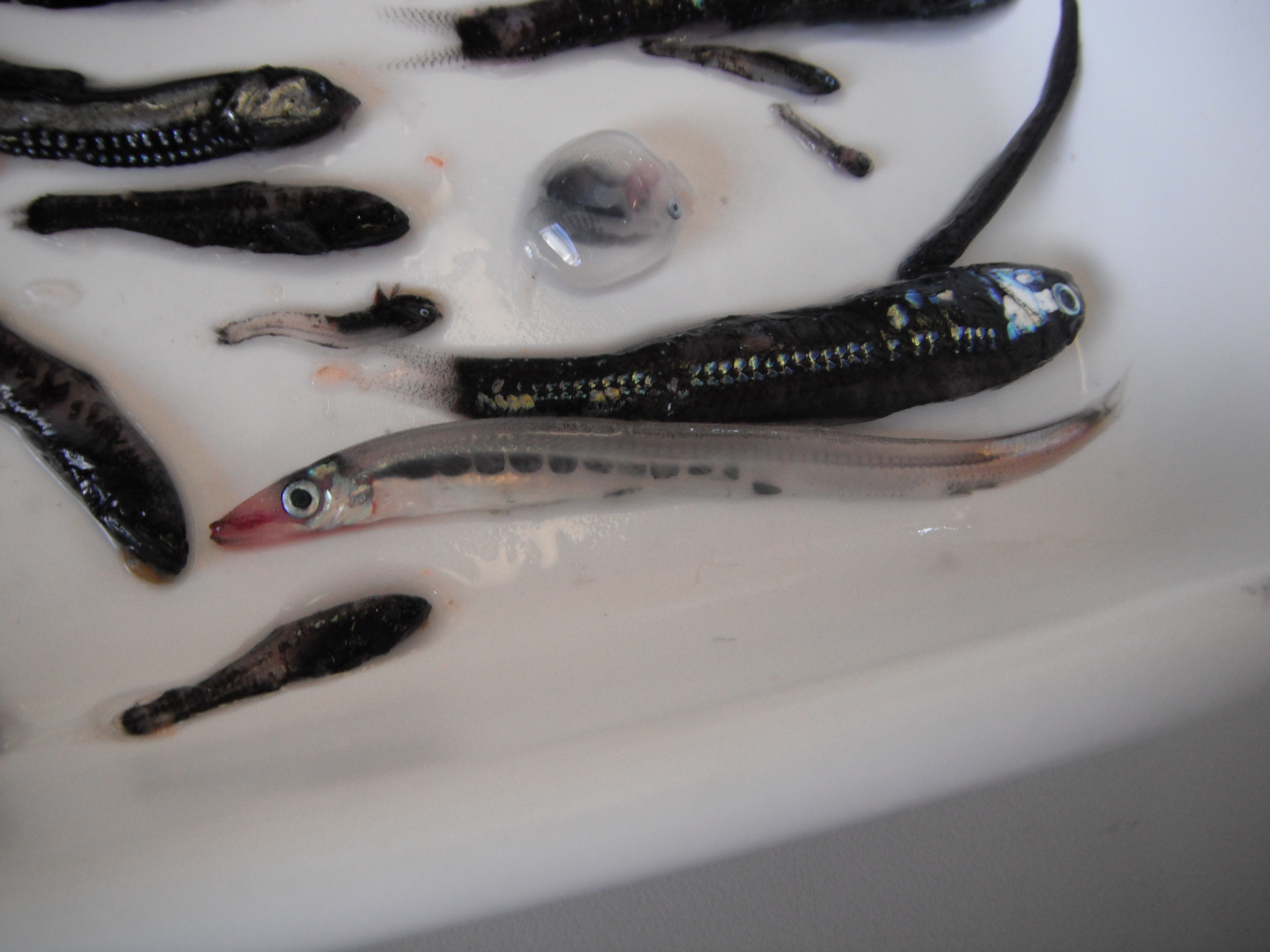
A collection of mesopelagic forage fishes trawled from the Gulf of Mexico that includes Myctophids, larval anglerfishes, bristlemouths, and a barracudina

=== Bathypelagic fish ===
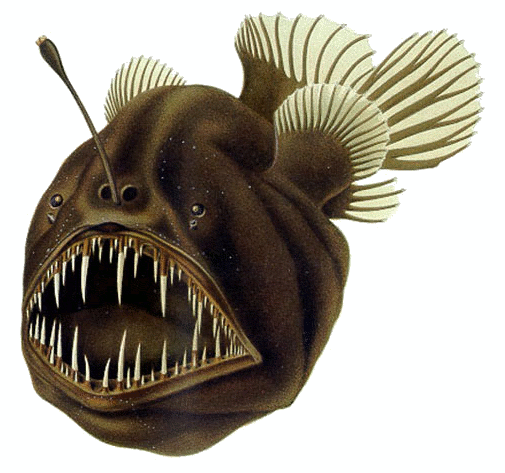
The humpback anglerfish is a bathypelagic ambush predator, which attracts prey with a bioluminescent lure. It can ingest prey larger than itself, which it swallows with an inrush of water when it opens its mouth.

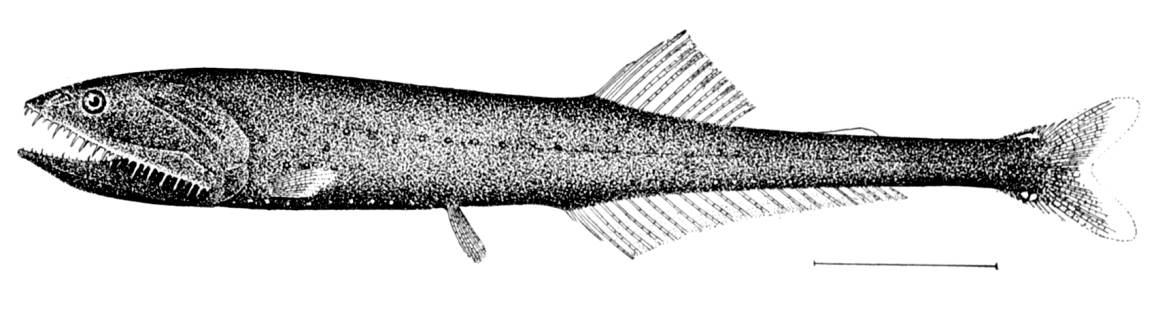
Many bristlemouth species, such as the "spark anglemouth" above, are also bathypelagic ambush predators that can swallow prey larger than themselves. They are among the most abundant of all vertebrate families.

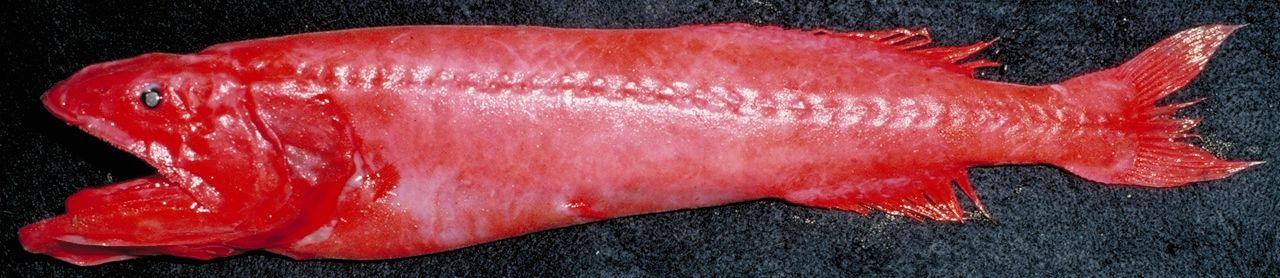
Young, red flabby whalefish make nightly vertical migrations into the lower mesopelagic zone to feed on copepods. When males mature into adults, they develop a massive liver and then their jaws fuse shut. They no longer eat, but continue to metabolise the energy stored in their liver.

Below the mesopelagic zone it is pitch dark. This is the midnight or bathypelagic zone, extending from 1000 m to the bottom deep water benthic zone. If the water is exceptionally deep, the pelagic zone below 4,000 metres (2.5 miles) sometimes is called the lower midnight or abyssopelagic zone.

Conditions are somewhat uniform throughout these zones, the darkness is complete, the pressure is crushing, and temperatures, nutrients, and dissolved oxygen levels are all low.

Bathypelagic fish have special adaptations to cope with these conditions – they have slow metabolisms and unspecialized diets, being willing to eat anything that comes along. They prefer to sit and wait for food rather than waste energy searching for it. The behaviour of bathypelagic fish can be contrasted with the behaviour of mesopelagic fish. Mesopelagic are often highly mobile, whereas bathypelagic fish are almost all lie-in-wait predators, normally expending little energy in movement.

The dominant bathypelagic fishes are small bristlemouth and anglerfish; fangtooth, viperfish, daggertooth, and barracudina are also common. These fishes are small, many about 10 centimetres (3.9 inches) long, and not many longer than 25 cm (9.8 in). They spend most of their time waiting patiently in the water column for prey to appear or to be lured by their phosphors. What little energy is available in the bathypelagic zone filters from above in the form of detritus, faecal material, and the occasional invertebrate or mesopelagic fish. About 20% of the food that has its origins in the epipelagic zone falls down to the mesopelagic zone, but only about 5% filters down to the bathypelagic zone.

Bathypelagic fish are sedentary, adapted to outputting minimum energy in a habitat with very little food or available energy, not even sunlight, only bioluminescence. Their bodies are elongated with weak, watery muscles and skeletal structures. Since so much of the fish is water, they are not compressed by the great pressures at these depths. They often have extensible, hinged jaws with recurved teeth. They are slimy, without scales. The central nervous system is confined to the lateral line and olfactory systems, the eyes are small and may not function, and gills, kidneys and hearts, and swimbladders are small or missing.

These are the same features found in fish larvae, which suggests that during their evolution, bathypelagic fish have acquired these features through neoteny. As with larvae, these features allow the fish to remain suspended in the water with little expenditure of energy.

Despite their ferocious appearance, these beasts of the deep are mostly miniature fish with weak muscles, and are too small to represent any threat to humans.

The swimbladders of deep sea fish are either absent or scarcely operational, and bathypelagic fish do not normally undertake vertical migrations. Filling bladders at such great pressures incurs huge energy costs. Some deep sea fishes have swimbladders that function while they are young and inhabit the upper epipelagic zone, but they wither or fill with fat when the fish move down to their adult habitat.

The most important sensory systems are usually the inner ear, which responds to sound, and the lateral line, which responds to changes in water pressure. The olfactory system also can be important for males who find females by smell. Bathypelagic fish are black, or sometimes red, with few photophores. When photophores are used, it is usually to entice prey or attract a mate. Because food is so scarce, bathypelagic predators are not selective in their feeding habits, but grab whatever comes close enough. They accomplish this by having a large mouth with sharp teeth for grabbing large prey and overlapping gill rakers that prevent small prey that have been swallowed from escaping.

It is not easy finding a mate in this zone. Some species depend on bioluminescence. Others are hermaphrodites, which doubles their chances of producing both eggs and sperm when an encounter occurs. The female anglerfish releases pheromones to attract tiny males. When a male finds her, he bites onto her and never lets go. When a male of the anglerfish species Haplophryne mollis bites into the skin of a female, he release an enzyme that digests the skin of his mouth and her body, fusing the pair to the point where the two circulatory systems join up. The male then atrophies into nothing more than a pair of gonads. This extreme sexual dimorphism ensures that, when the female is ready to spawn, she has a mate immediately available.

Many animal forms other than fish live in the bathypelagic zone, such as squid, large whales, octopuses, sponges, brachiopods, sea stars, and echinoids, but this zone is difficult for fish to live in.

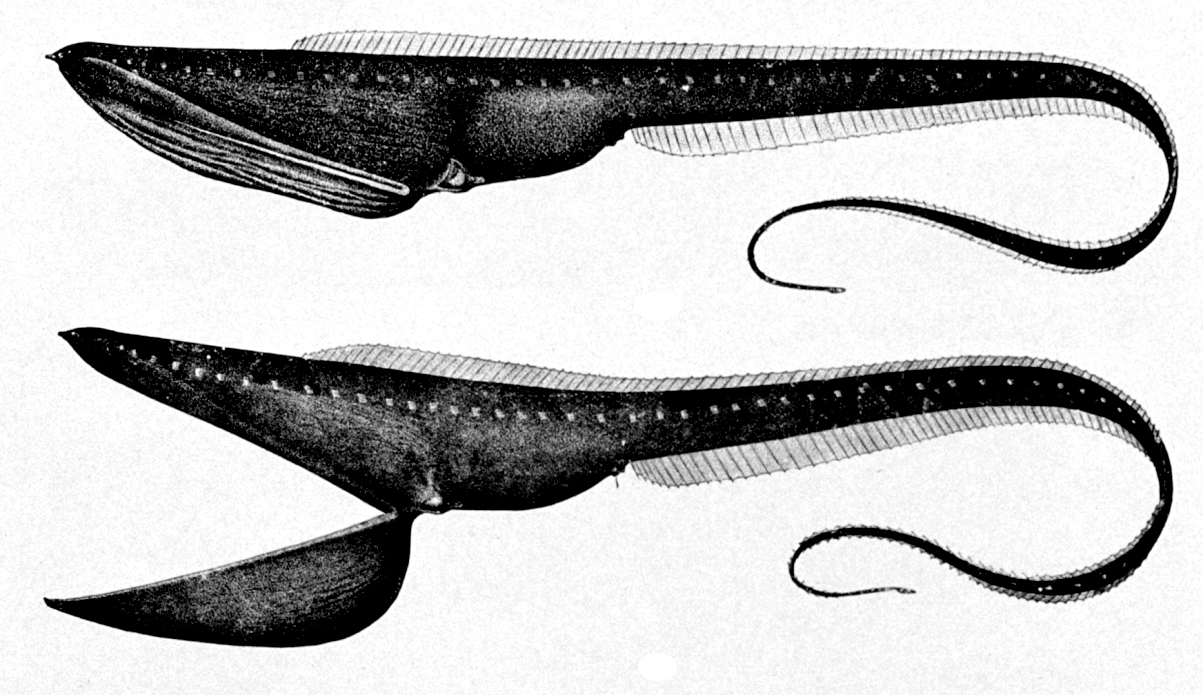
The gulper eel uses its mouth like a net by opening its large mouth and swimming at its prey. It has a luminescent organ at the tip of its tail to attract prey.

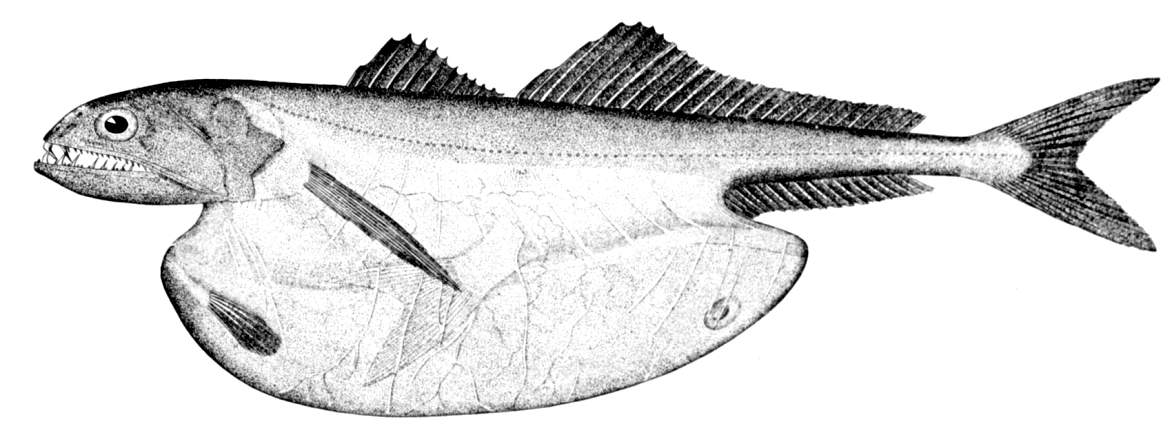
The black swallower, with its distensible stomach, is notable for its ability to swallow whole bony fishes ten times its mass.

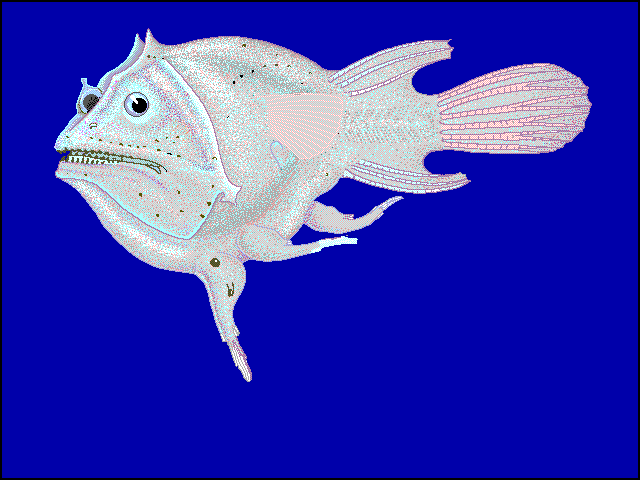
Female Haplophryne mollis anglerfish trailing attached males that have atrophied into a pair of gonads, for use when the female is ready to spawn.

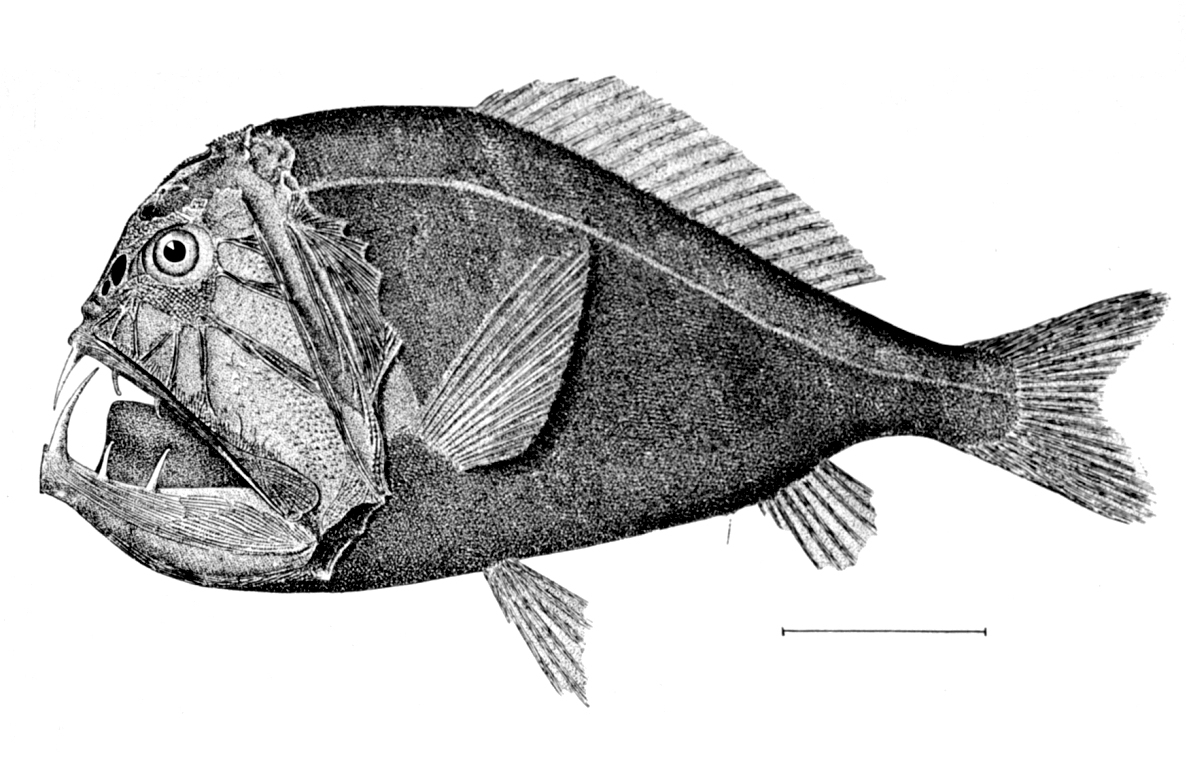
The widespread fangtooth has the largest teeth of any fish, proportionate to body size. Despite their ferocious appearance, bathypelagic fish are usually weakly muscled and too small to represent any threat to humans.

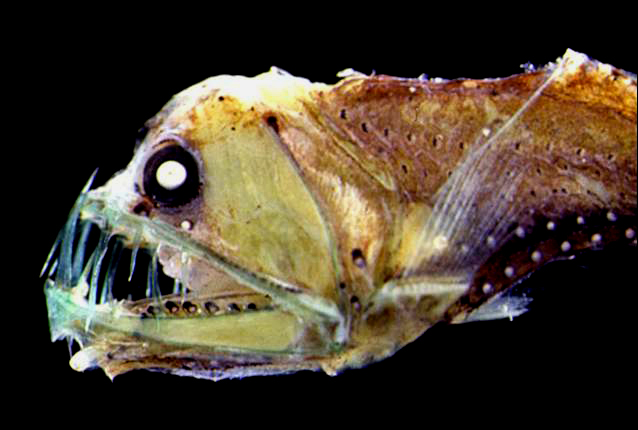
The Sloane's viperfish can make nightly migrations from bathypelagic depths to near surface waters.

== Demersal fish ==
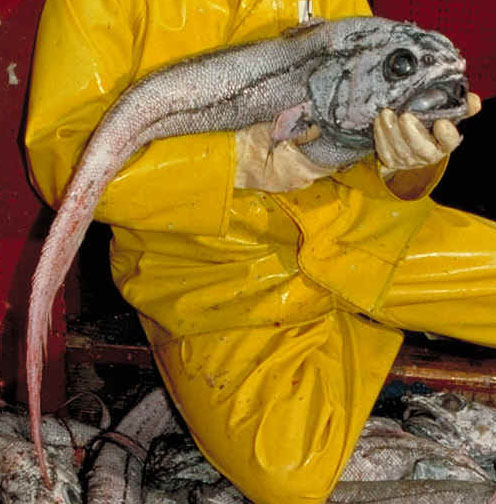
Giant grenadier, an elongate benthic fish with large eyes and well-developed lateral lines

Demersal fish live on or near the bottom of the sea. Demersal fish are found by the seafloor in coastal areas on the continental shelf, and in the open ocean they are found along the outer continental margin on the continental slope and the continental rise. They are not generally found at abyssopelagic or hadopelagic depths or on the abyssal plain. They occupy a range of seafloors consisting of mud, sand, gravel, or rocks.

In deep waters, the fishes of the demersal zone are active and relatively abundant, compared to fishes of the bathypelagic zone.

Rattails and brotulas are common, and other well-established families are eels, eelpouts, hagfishes, greeneyes, batfishes, and lumpfishes.

The bodies of deep water benthic fishes are muscular with well developed organs. In this way they are closer to mesopelagic fishes than bathopelagic fishes. In other ways, they are more variable. Photophores are usually absent, eyes and swimbladders range from absent to well developed. They vary in size, with larger species greater than one metre not uncommon.

Deep sea benthic fish are usually long and narrow. Many are eels or shaped like eels. This may be because long bodies have long lateral lines. Lateral lines detect low-frequency sounds, and some benthic fishes appear to have muscles that drum such sounds to attract mates. Smell is also important, as indicated by the rapidity with which benthic fish find traps baited with bait fish.

The main diet of deep sea benthic fish is invertebrates of the deep sea benthos and carrion. Smell, touch, and lateral line sensitivities seem to be the main sensory devices for locating these.

Deep sea benthic fish can be divided into strictly benthic fish and benthopelagic fish. Usually, strictly benthic fish are negatively buoyant, while benthopelagic fish are neutrally buoyant. Strictly benthic fish stay in constant contact with the bottom. They either lie in wait as ambush predators or move actively over the bottom in search for food.

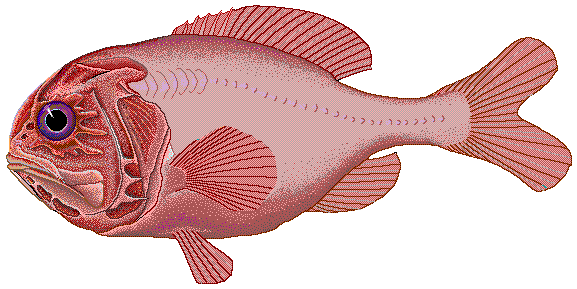
Orange roughy

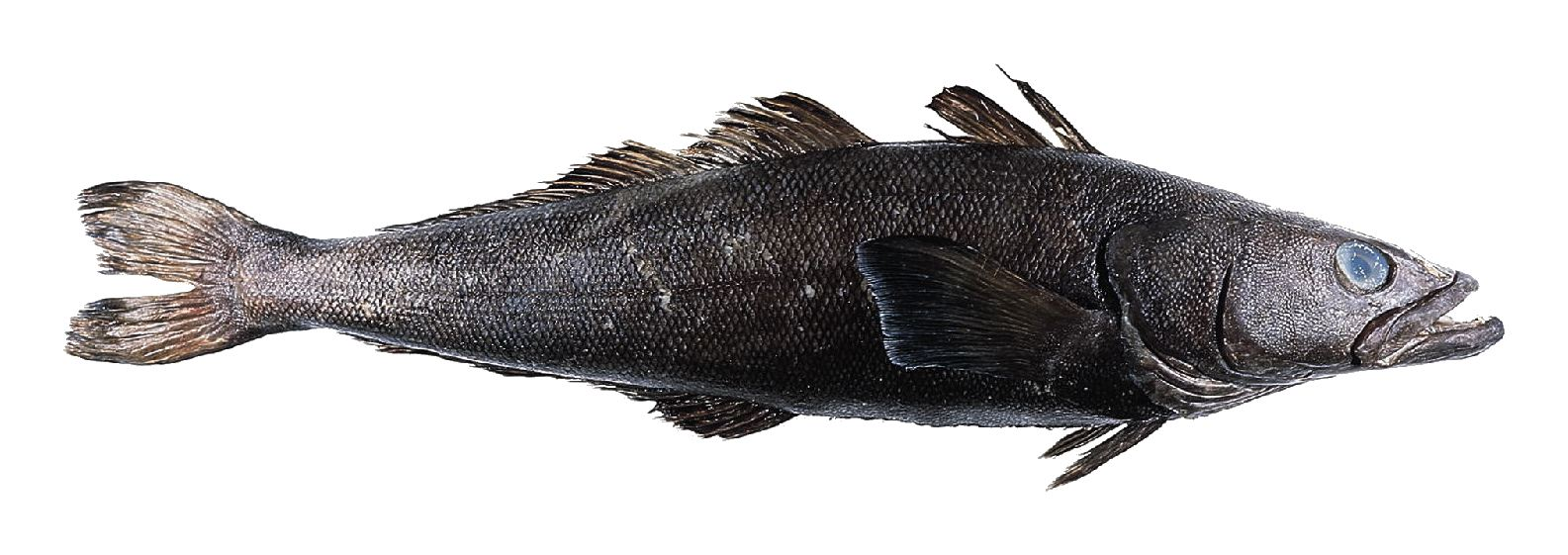
Patagonian toothfish

=== Benthopelagic fish ===
Benthopelagic fish inhabit the water just above the bottom, feeding on benthos and benthopelagic zooplankton. Most dermersal fish are benthopelagic.

They can be divided into flabby or robust body types. Flabby benthopelagic fishes are like bathopelagic fishes, they have a reduced body mass, and low metabolic rates, expending minimal energy as they lie and wait to ambush prey. An example of a flabby fish is the cusk-eel Acanthonus armatus, a predator with a huge head and a body that is 90% water. This fish has the largest ears (otoliths) and the smallest brain in relation to its body size of all known vertebrates.

Robust benthopelagic fish are muscular swimmers that actively cruise the bottom searching for prey. They may live around features, such as seamounts, which have strong currents. Examples are the orange roughy and Patagonian toothfish. Because these fish were once abundant, and because their robust bodies are good to eat, these fish have been harvested commercially.

=== Benthic fish ===
Benthic fish are not pelagic fish, but they are discussed here briefly, by way of completeness and contrast.

Some fishes do not fit into the above classification. For example, the family of nearly blind spiderfishes, common and widely distributed, feed on benthopelagic zooplankton. Yet they are strictly benthic fish, since they stay in contact with the bottom. Their fins have long rays they use to "stand" on the bottom while they face the current and grab zooplankton as it passes by.

The deepest-living fish known, the strictly benthic Abyssobrotula galatheae, eel-like and blind, feeds on benthic invertebrates.

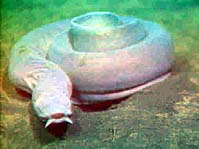
Pacific hagfish resting on bottom. Hagfish coat themselves and any dead fish they find with noxious slime, making them inedible to other species.

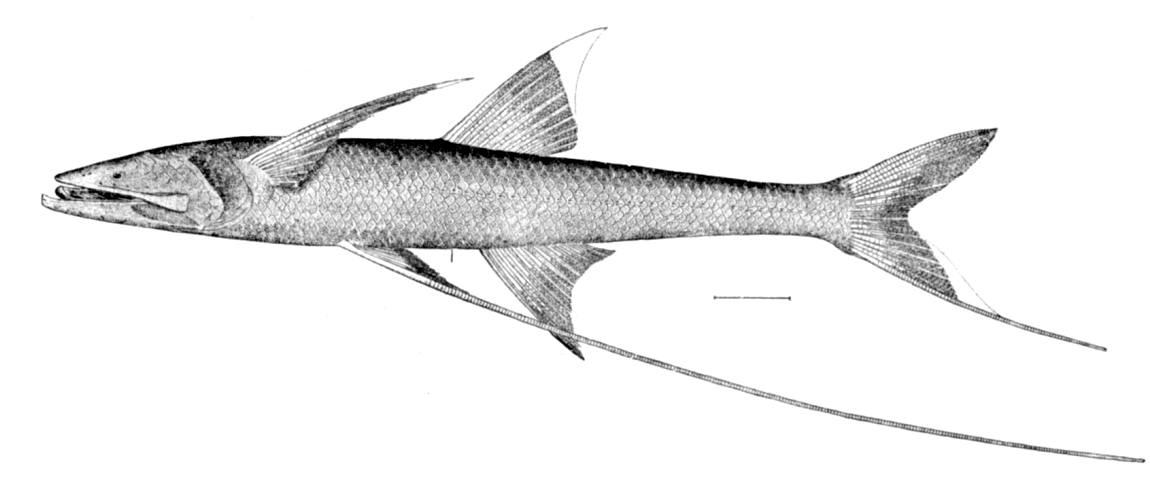
The tripodfish (Bathypterois grallator), a species of spiderfish, uses its fin extensions to "stand" on the bottom.

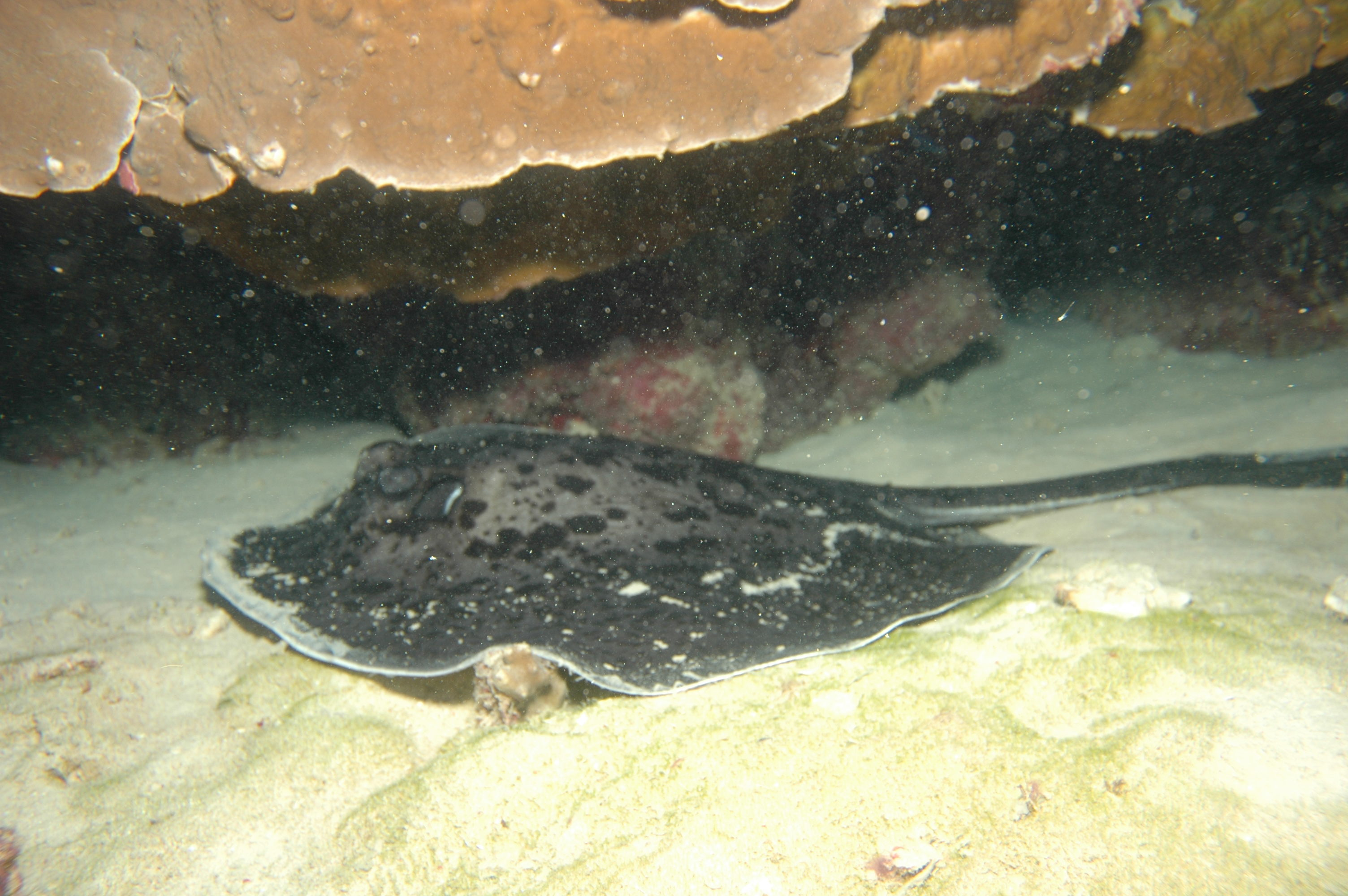
The blotched fantail ray feeds on bottom-dwelling fish, bivalves, crabs, and shrimps.

Cross-section of an ocean basin, note significant vertical exaggeration

At great depths, food scarcity and extreme pressure works to limit the survivability of fish. The deepest point of the ocean is about 11,000 metres (6.8 miles). Bathypelagic fishes are not normally found below 3,000 metres (1.9 miles). The greatest depth recorded for a benthic fish is 8,370 m (5.20 mi). It may be that extreme pressures interfere with essential enzyme functions.

Benthic fishes are more diverse and are likely to be found on the continental slope, where there is habitat diversity and often, food supplies. Approximately 40% of the ocean floor consists of abyssal plains, but these flat, featureless regions are covered with sediment and largely devoid of benthic life (benthos). Deep sea benthic fishes are more likely to associate with canyons or rock outcroppings among the plains, where invertebrate communities are established. Undersea mountains (seamounts) can intercept deep sea currents and cause productive upwellings that support benthic fish. Undersea mountain ranges may separate underwater regions into different ecosystems.

== Pelagic fisheries ==
=== Forage fish ===
- - - - pelagic
        - predator
          - tuna
          - billfish
          - shark
        - forage
          - herring
          - sardine
          - anchovy
          - menhaden
      - demersal
        - benthopelagic
          cod
        - benthic
          flatfish

Major marine wild fisheries

Small pelagic fish are usually forage fish that are hunted by larger pelagic fish and other predators. Forage fish filter feed on plankton and are usually less than 10 centimetres (3.9 inches) long. They often stay together in schools and may migrate large distances between spawning grounds and feeding grounds. They are found particularly in upwelling regions around the northeast Atlantic, off the coast of Japan, and off the west coasts of Africa and the Americas. Forage fish are generally short-lived, and their stocks fluctuate markedly over the years.

Herring are found in the North Sea and the North Atlantic at depths to 200 metres (660 feet). Important herring fisheries have existed in these areas for centuries. Herring of different sizes and growth rates belong to different populations, each of which have their own migration routes. When spawning, a female produces from 20,000 to 50,000 eggs. After spawning, the herrings are depleted of fat, and migrate back to feeding grounds rich in plankton. Around Iceland, three separate populations of herring were fished traditionally. These stocks collapsed in the late 1960s, although two have since recovered. After the collapse, Iceland turned to capelin, which now account for about half of Iceland's total catch.

Blue whiting are found in the open ocean and above the continental slope at depths between 100 and 1000 meters. They follow vertical migrations of the zooplankton they feed on to the bottom during daytime and to the surface at night time.

Traditional fisheries for anchovies and sardines also have operated in the Pacific, the Mediterranean, and the southeast Atlantic. The world annual catch of forage fish in recent years has been approximately 22 million tonnes, or one quarter of the world's total catch.

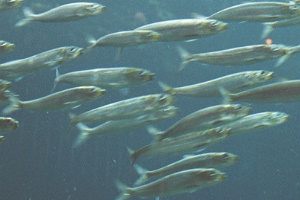
These schooling Pacific sardines are forage fish.

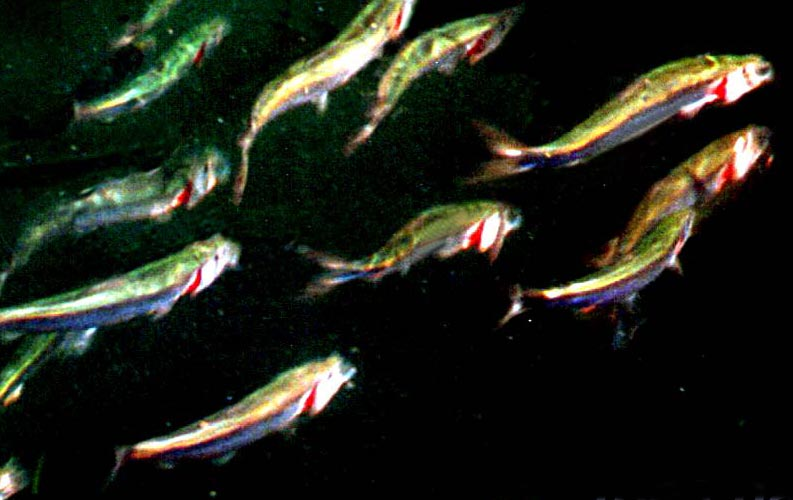
Herrings ram feeding on copepods

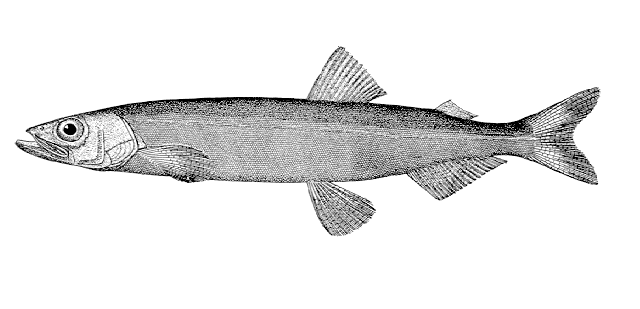
Capelin

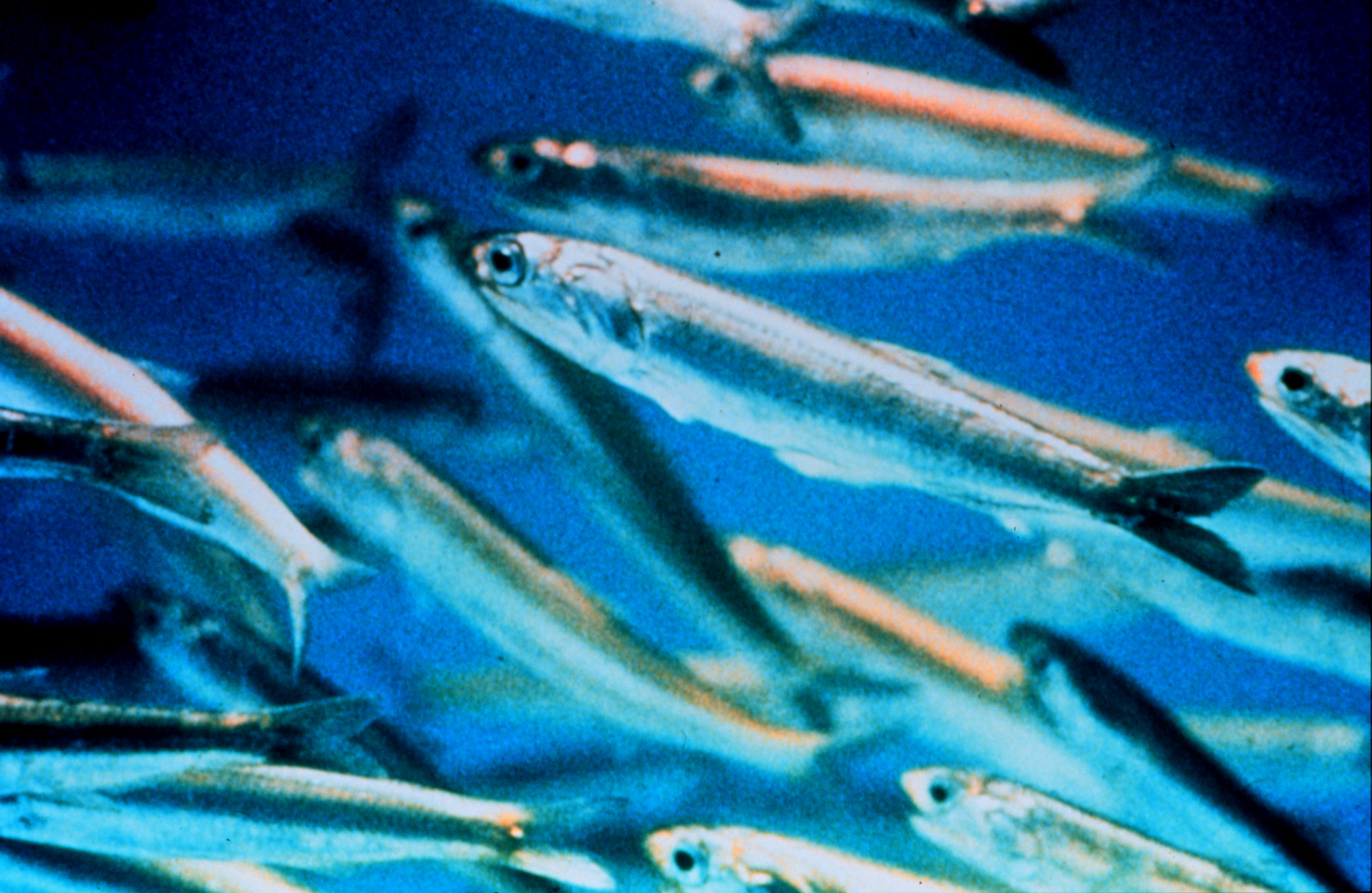
Anchovies

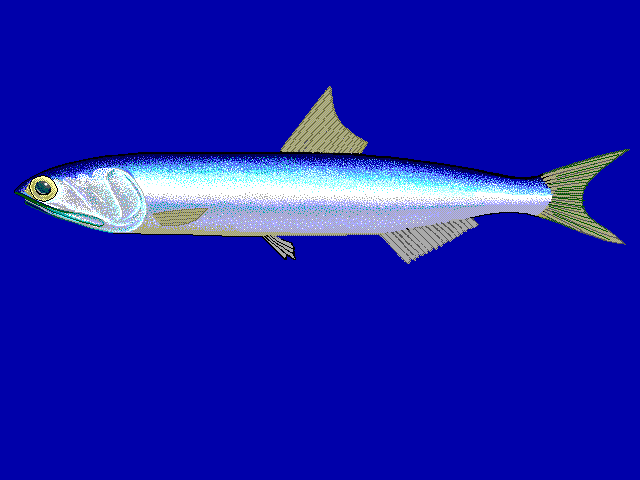
Peruvian anchoveta

=== Predator fish ===
Medium size pelagic fishes include trevally, barracuda, flying fish, bonito, mahi mahi, and coastal mackerel. Many of these fish hunt forage fish, but are in turn, hunted by yet larger pelagic fish. Nearly all fish are predator fish to some measure, and apart from the top predators, the distinction between predator fish and prey or forage fish, is somewhat artificial.

Around Europe there are three populations of coastal mackerel. One population migrates to the North Sea, another stays in the waters of the Irish Sea, and the third population migrates southward along the west coast of Scotland and Ireland. The cruise speed of the mackerel is an impressive 10 kilometres per hour.

Many large pelagic fish are oceanic nomadic species that undertake long offshore migrations. They feed on small pelagic forage fish, as well as medium-sized pelagic fish. At times, they follow their schooling prey, and many species form schools themselves.

Examples of larger pelagic fish are tuna, billfish, king mackerel, sharks, and large rays.

Tuna in particular are of major importance to commercial fisheries. Although tuna migrate across oceans, trying to find them there is not the usual approach. Tuna tend to congregate in areas where food is abundant, along the boundaries of currents, around islands, near seamounts, and in some areas of upwelling along continental slopes. Tuna are captured by several methods: purse seine vessels enclose an entire surface school with special nets, pole and line vessels that use poles baited with other smaller pelagic fish as baitfish, and rafts called fish aggregating devices are set up, because tuna, as well as some other pelagic fish, tend to congregate under floating objects.

Other large pelagic fish are premier game fish, particularly marlin and swordfish.

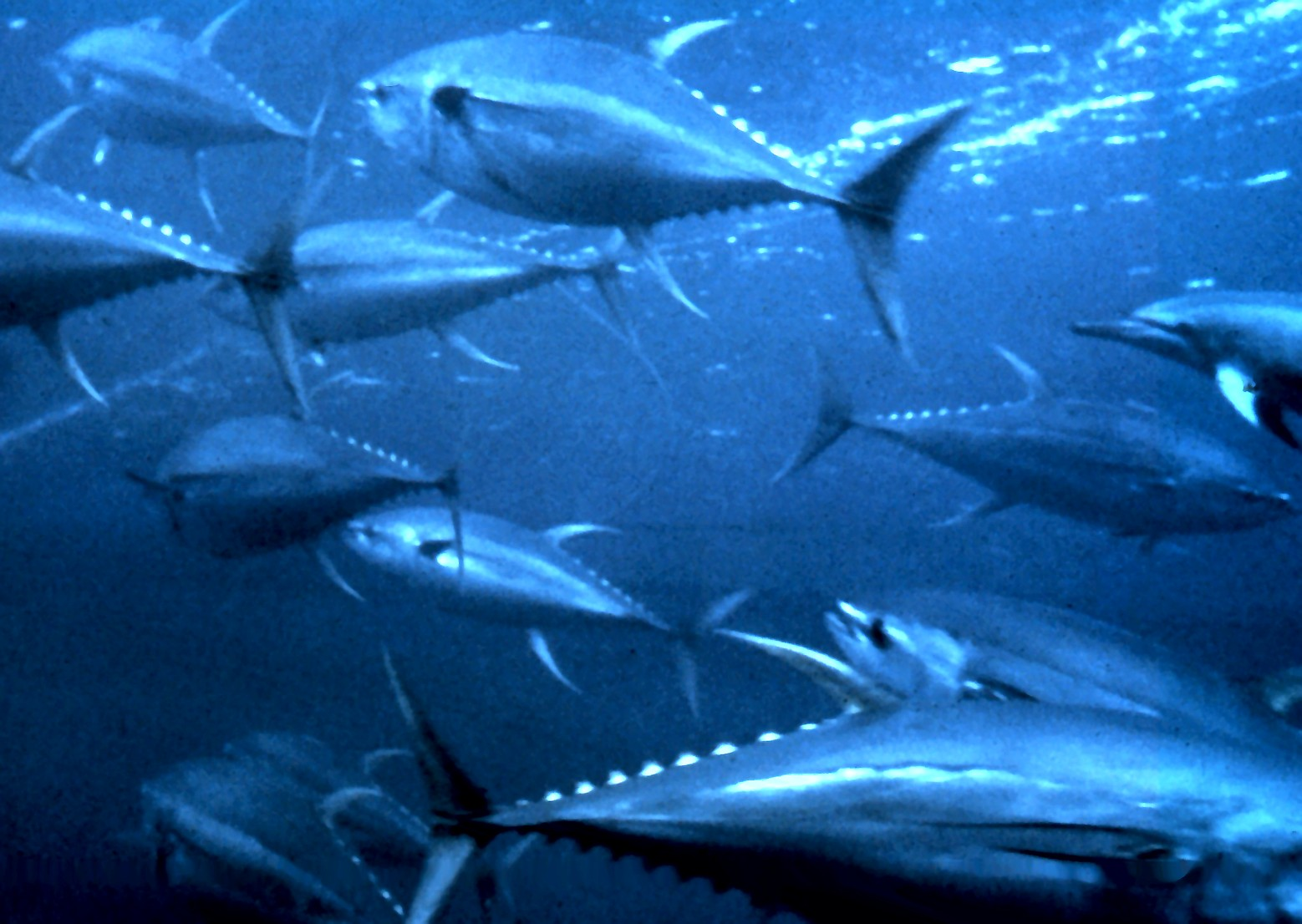
Yellowfin tuna are being fished as a replacement for the now largely depleted Southern bluefin tuna.

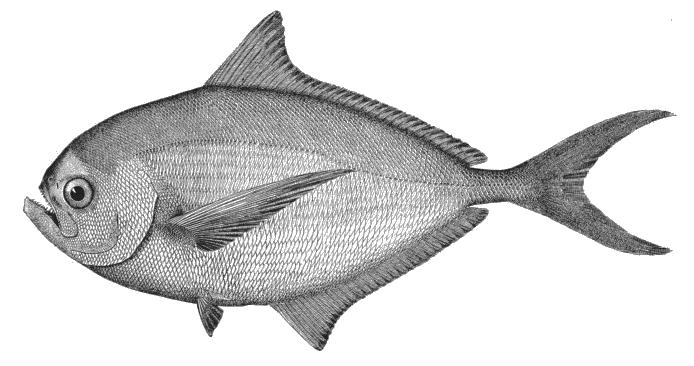
Atlantic pomfret

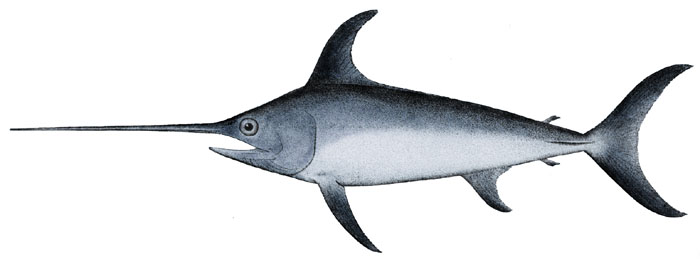
Swordfish

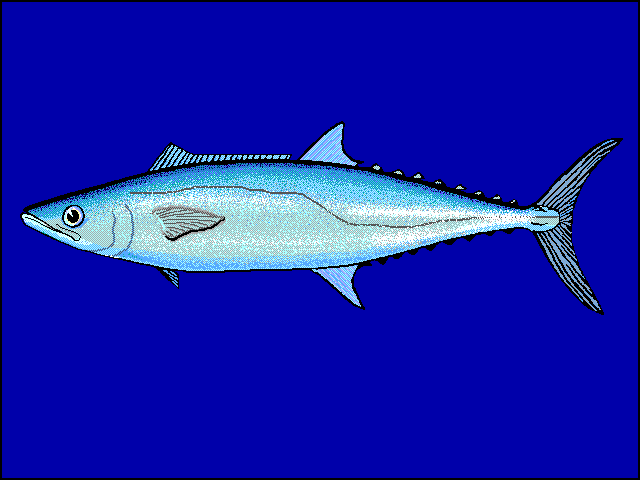
King mackerels cruise on long migrations at 10 kilometres per hour.

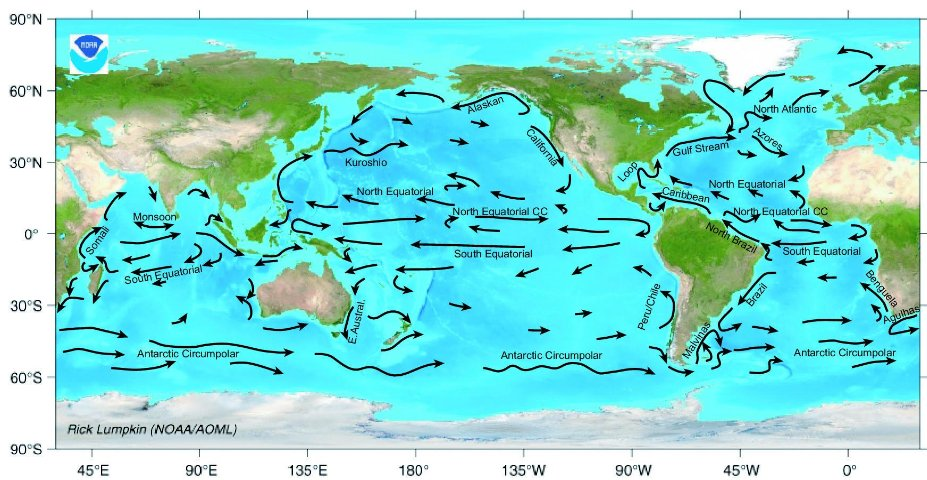
Major ocean surface currents

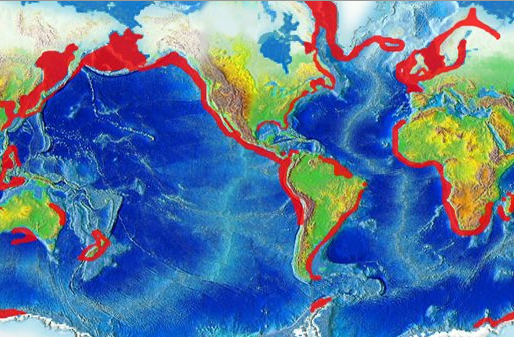
Areas of upwelling in red

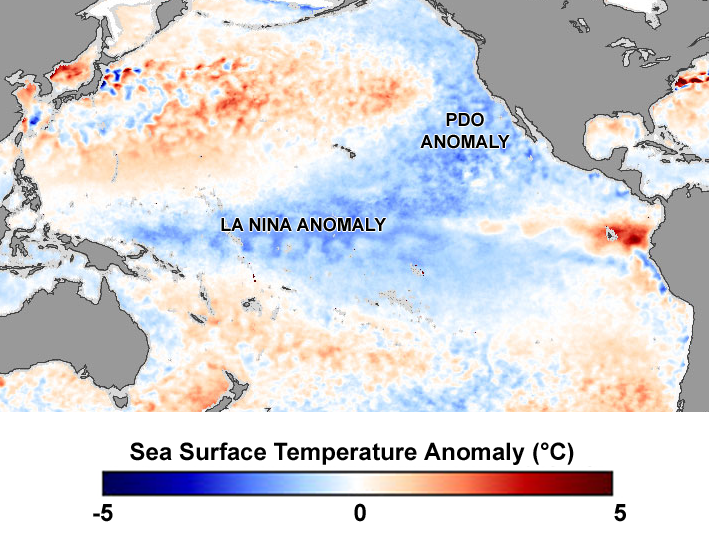
Pacific decadal anomalies – April 2008

=== Productivity ===
Upwelling occurs both along coastlines and in midocean when a collision of deep ocean currents brings cold water that is rich in nutrients to the surface. These upwellings support blooms of phytoplankton, which in turn, produce zooplankton and support many of the world's main fisheries. If the upwelling fails, then fisheries in the area fail.

In the 1960s the Peruvian anchoveta fishery was the world's largest fishery. The anchoveta population was greatly reduced during the 1972 El Niño event, when warm water drifted over the cold Humboldt Current, as part of a 50-year cycle, lowering the depth of the thermocline. The upwelling stopped and phytoplankton production plummeted, as did the anchoveta population, and millions of seabirds, dependent on the anchoveta, died. Since the mid-1980s, the upwelling has resumed, and the Peruvian anchoveta catch levels have returned to the 1960s levels.

Off Japan, the collision of the Oyashio Current with the Kuroshio Current produces nutrient-rich upwellings. Cyclic changes in these currents resulted in a decline in the sardine sardinops melanosticta populations. Fisheries catches fell from 5 million tonnes in 1988 to 280 thousand tonnes in 1998. As a further consequence, Pacific bluefin tuna stopped moving into the region to feed.

Ocean currents can shape how fish are distributed, both concentrating and dispersing them. Adjacent ocean currents can define distinct, if shifting, boundaries. These boundaries can even be visible, but usually their presence is marked by rapid changes in salinity, temperature, and turbidity.

For example, in the Asian northern Pacific, albacore are confined between two current systems. The northern boundary is determined by the cold North Pacific Current and the southern boundary is determined by the North Equatorial Current. To complicate things, their distribution is further modified within the area defined by the two current systems by another current, the Kuroshio Current, whose flows fluctuate seasonally.

Epipelagic fish often spawn in an area where the eggs and larvae drift downstream into suitable feeding areas, and eventually, drift into adult feeding areas.

Islands and banks can interact with currents and upwellings in a manner that results in areas of high ocean productivity. Large eddies can form downcurrent or downwind from islands, concentrating plankton. Banks and reefs can intercept deep currents that upwell.

- Scombrids

=== Highly migratory species ===
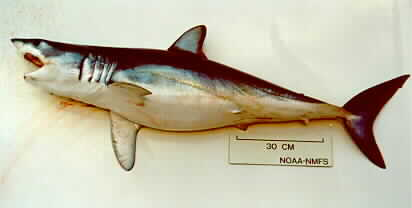
Shortfin mako shark make long seasonal migrations. They appear to follow temperature gradients, and have been recorded travelling more than 4,500 km in one year.

Epipelagic fish generally move long distances between feeding and spawning areas, or as a response to changes in the ocean. Large ocean predators, such as salmon and tuna, can migrate thousands of kilometres, crossing oceans.

In a 2001 study, the movements of Atlantic bluefin tuna from an area off North Carolina were studied with the help of special popup tags. When attached to a tuna, these tags monitored the movements of the tuna for about a year, then detached and floated to the surface where they transmitted their information to a satellite. The study found that the tuna had four different migration patterns. One group confined itself to the western Atlantic for a year. Another group also stayed mainly in the western Atlantic, but migrated to the Gulf of Mexico for spawning. A third group moved across the Atlantic Ocean and back again. The fourth group crossed to the eastern Atlantic and then moved into the Mediterranean Sea for spawning. The study indicates that, while there is some differentiation by spawning areas, there is essentially only one population of Atlantic bluefin tuna, intermixing groups that between them, use all of the north Atlantic Ocean, the Gulf of Mexico, and the Mediterranean Sea.

The term highly migratory species (HMS) is a legal term that has its origins in Article 64 of the United Nations Convention on the Law of the Sea (UNCLOS).

The highly migratory species include: tuna and tuna-like species (albacore, Atlantic bluefin, bigeye tuna, skipjack, yellowfin, blackfin, little tunny, Pacific bluefin, southern bluefin and bullet), pomfret, marlin, sailfish, swordfish, saury and oceangoing sharks, as well as mammals such as dolphins, and other cetaceans.

Essentially, highly migratory species coincide with the larger of the "large pelagic fish", discussed in the previous section, if cetaceans are added and some commercially unimportant fish, such as the sunfish, are excluded. These are high trophic level species that undertake migrations of significant, but variable distances across oceans for feeding, often on forage fish, or reproduction, and also have wide geographic distributions. Thus, these species are found both inside the 200-nautical-mile (370 km) exclusive economic zones and in the high seas outside these zones. They are pelagic species, which means they mostly live in the open ocean and do not live near the sea floor, although they may spend part of their life cycle in nearshore waters.

=== Capture production ===
According to the Food and Agriculture Organization (FAO), the world harvest in 2005 consisted of 93.2 million tonnes captured by commercial fishing in wild fisheries. Of this total, about 45% were pelagic fish. The following table shows the world capture production in tonnes.

Capture production by groups of species in tonnes
Type	Group	1999	2000	2001	2002	2003	2004	2005
Small pelagic fish	Herrings, sardines, anchovies	22 671 427	24 919 239	20 640 734	22 289 332	18 840 389	23 047 541	22 404 769
Large pelagic fish	Tunas, bonitos, billfishes	5 943 593	5 816 647	5 782 841	6 138 999	6 197 087	6 160 868	6 243 122
Other pelagic fish		10 712 994	10 654 041	12 332 170	11 772 320	11 525 390	11 181 871	11 179 641
Cartilaginous fish	Sharks, rays, chimaeras	858 007	870 455	845 854	845 820	880 785	819 012	771 105

== Threatened species ==
In 2009, the International Union for Conservation of Nature (IUCN) produced the first red list for threatened oceanic sharks and rays. They claim that approximately one third of open ocean sharks and rays are under threat of extinction. There are 64 species of oceanic sharks and rays on the list, including hammerheads, giant devil rays, and porbeagle.

Oceanic sharks are captured incidentally by swordfish and tuna high seas fisheries. In the past there were few markets for sharks, which were regarded as worthless bycatch. Now sharks are being increasingly targeted to supply emerging Asian markets, particularly for shark fins, which are used in shark fin soup.

The northwest Atlantic Ocean shark populations are estimated to have declined by 50% since the early 1970s. Oceanic sharks are vulnerable because they do not produce many young, and the young can take decades to mature.

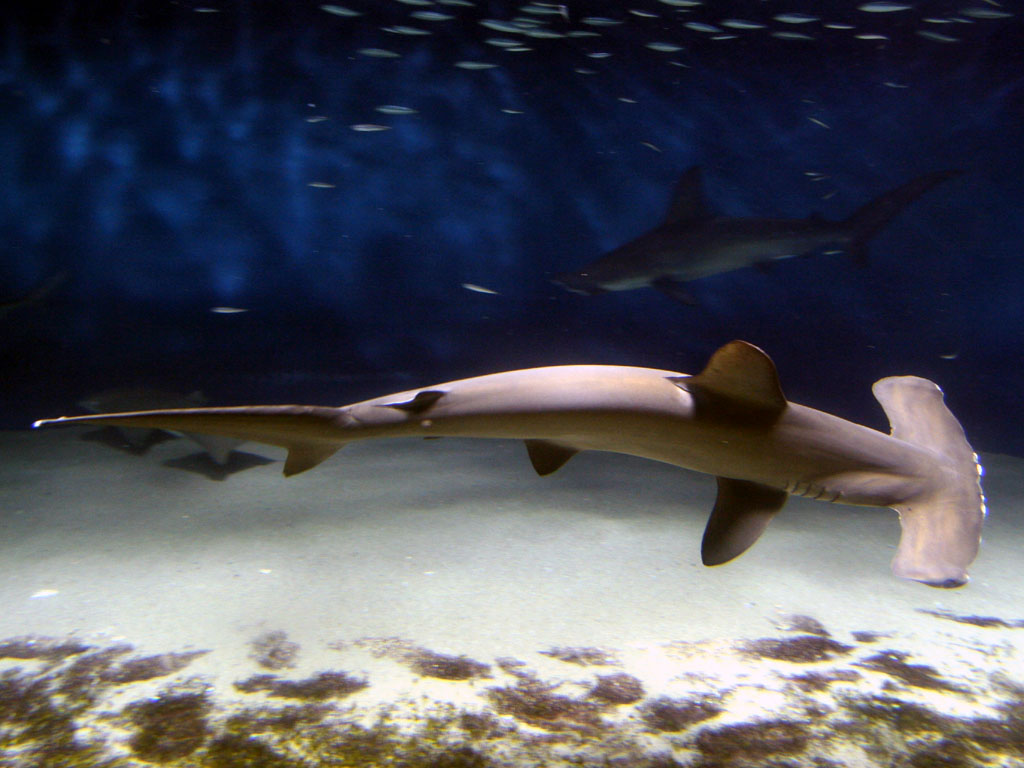
The scalloped hammerhead is classified as endangered.

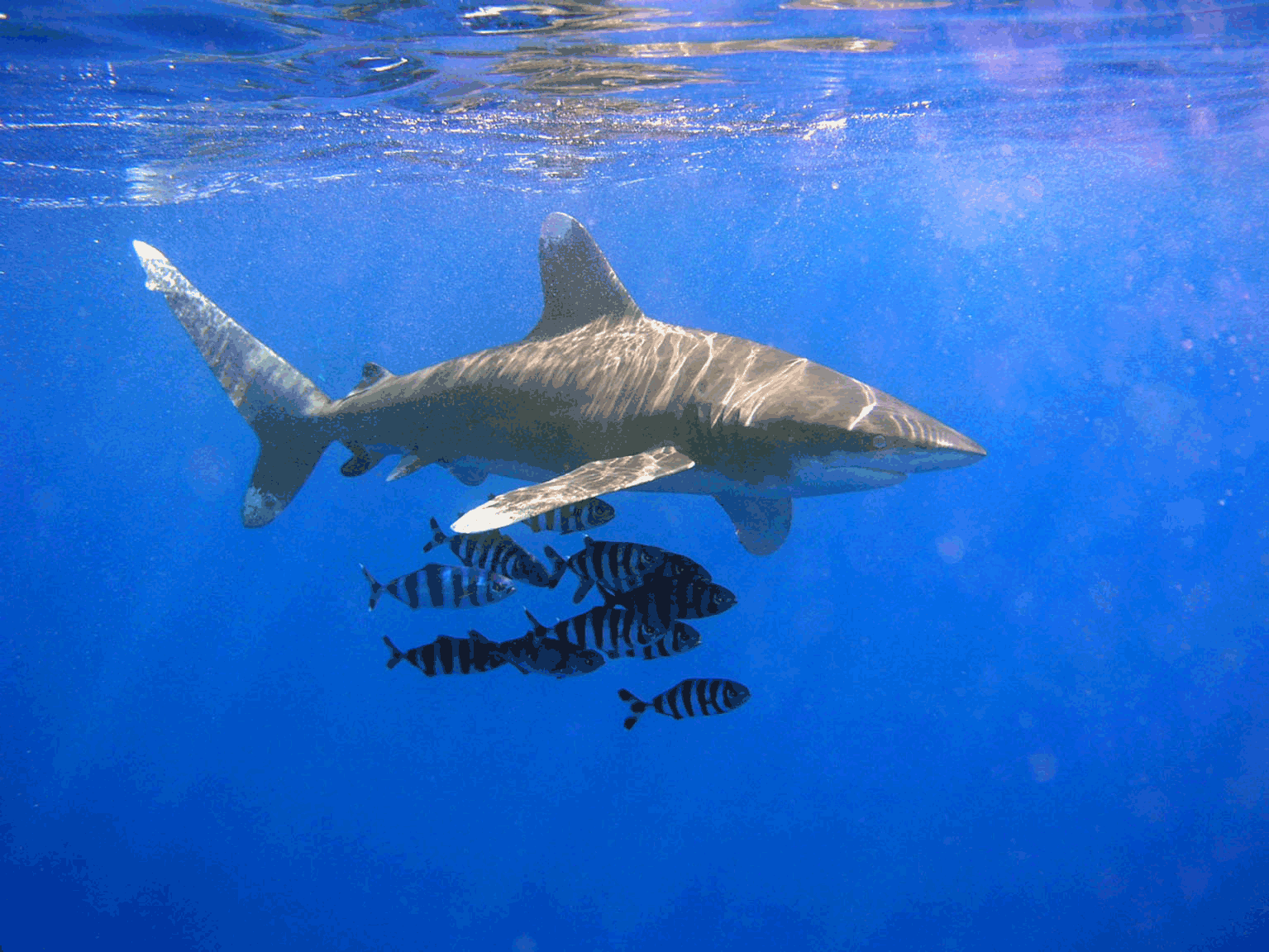
The oceanic whitetip shark has declined by 99% in the Gulf of Mexico.

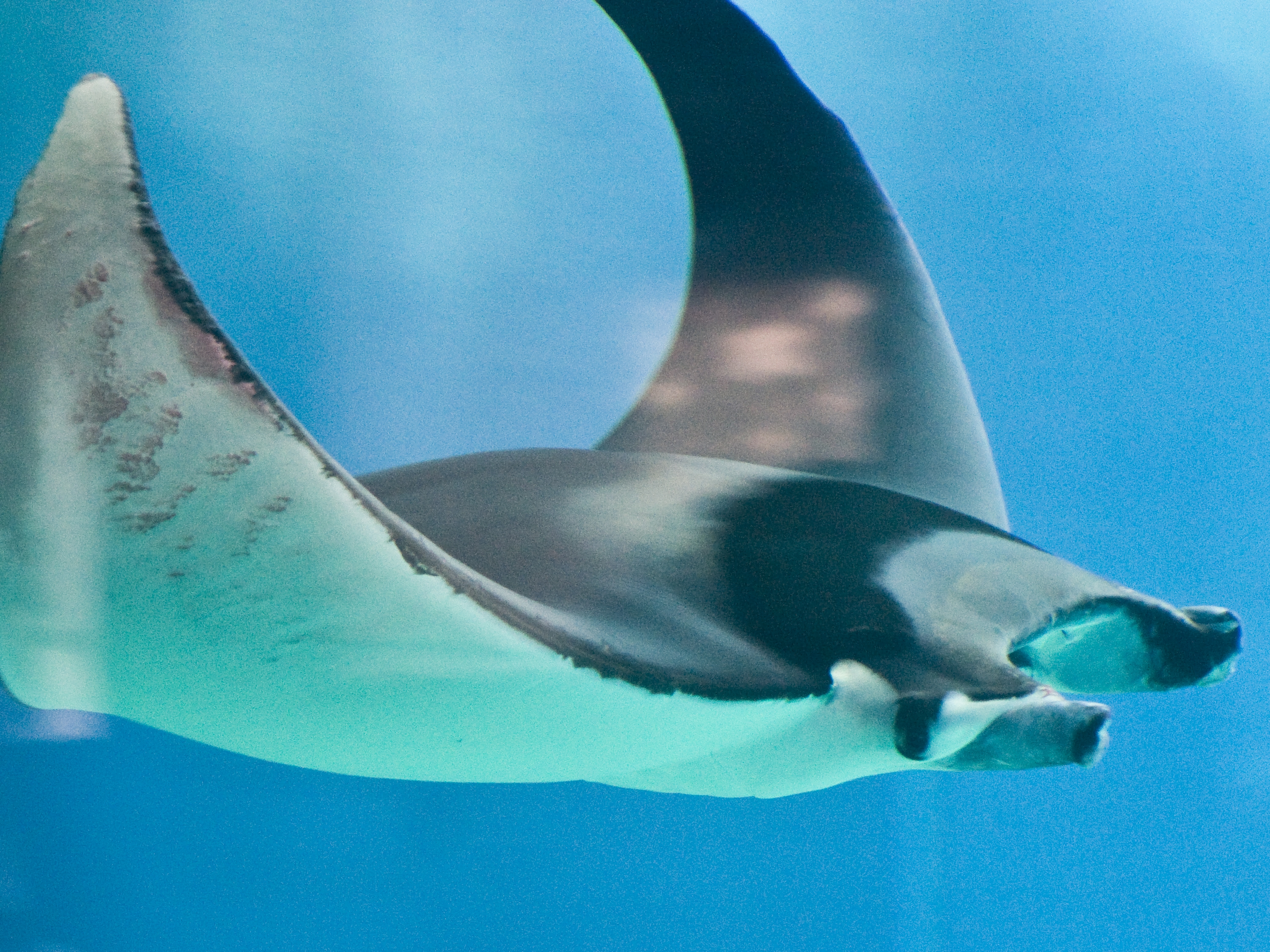
The devil fish, a large ray, is threatened.

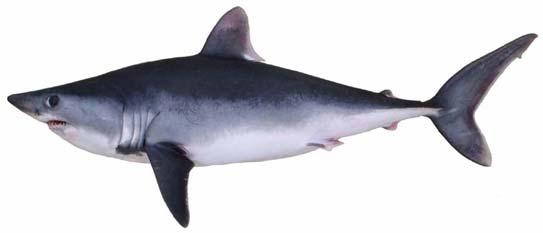
The porbeagle shark is threatened.

In parts of the world the scalloped hammerhead shark has declined by 99% since the late 1970s. Its status on the red list is that it is globally endangered, meaning it is near extinction.

== See also ==
- Deep sea
- Deep-sea fish
- Freshwater fish
- Nekton
- Ocean Tracking Network
- Oily fish
- Pacific Ocean Shelf Tracking Project
- Tagging of Pacific Predators
