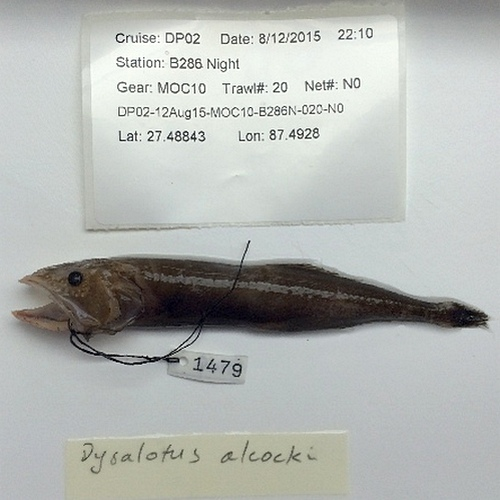

Scientific classification
- Kingdom: Animalia
- Phylum: Chordata
- Class: Actinopterygii
- Order: Scombriformes
- Family: Chiasmodontidae
- Genus: Dysalotus; MacGilchrist, 1905

Type species
- Dysalotus alcocki MacGilchrist, 1905

= Dysalotus =

Genus of ray-finned fishes

Dysalotus is a genus of ray-finned fish in the family Chiasmodontidae found in the Atlantic, Indian and Pacific Ocean.

== Species ==
There are currently 3 recognized species in this genus:

- Dysalotus alcocki MacGilchrist, 1905
- Dysalotus oligoscolus R. K. Johnson & Cohen, 1974
- Dysalotus pouliulii M. R. S. de Melo, 2016
