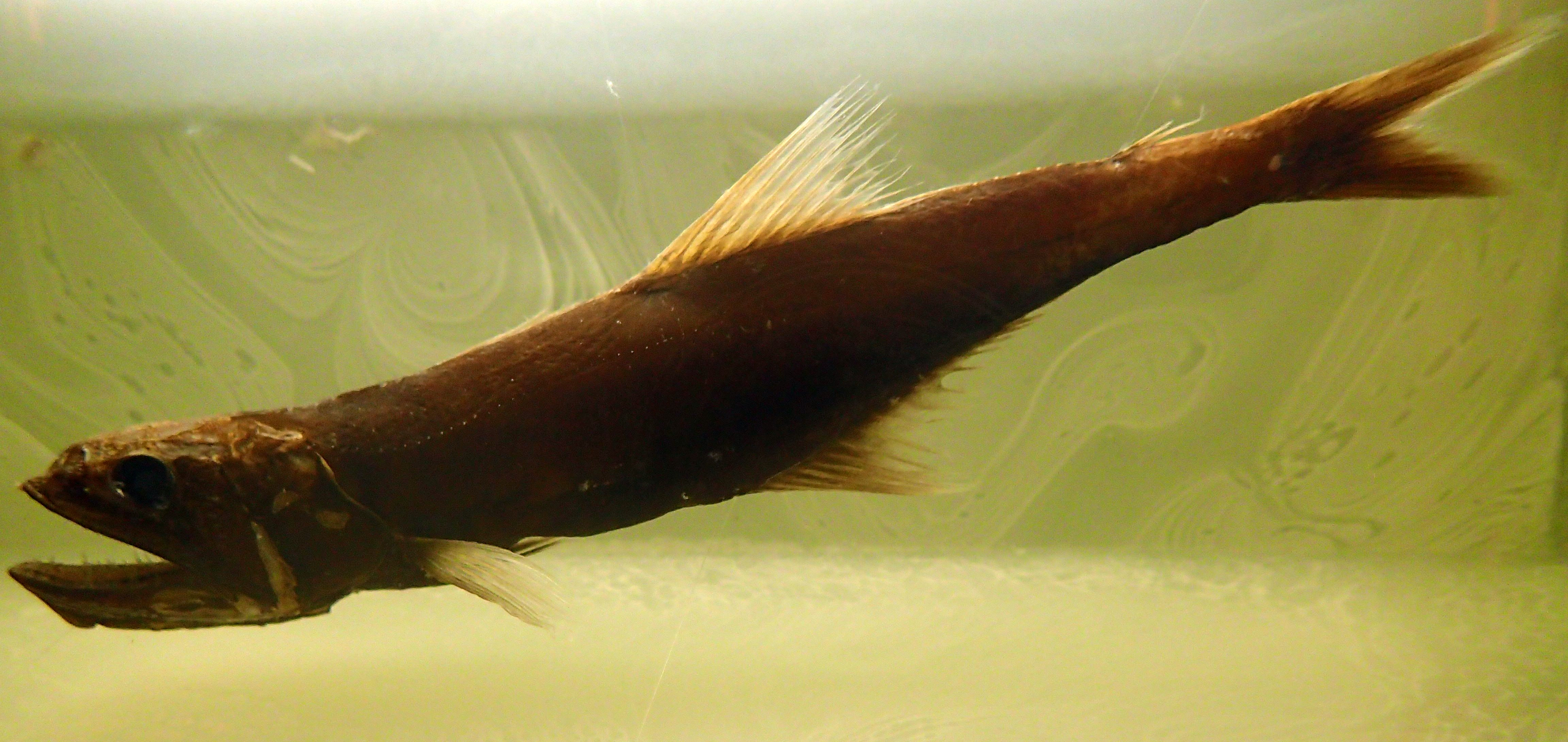
- Kali indica

Scientific classification
- Kingdom: Animalia
- Phylum: Chordata
- Class: Actinopterygii
- Order: Scombriformes
- Family: Chiasmodontidae
- Genus: Kali; Lloyd, 1909

Type species
- Kali indica Lloyd, 1909

Synonyms
- Dolichodon Parr 1931; Gargaropteron J.L.B Smith, 1965; Hemicyclodon Parr, 1931; Odontonema Weber 1913

= Kali (fish) =

Genus of ray-finned fishes

Kali is a genus of snaketooth fishes, deep ocean fish from the family Chiasmodontidae.

== Etymology ==
The genus is named after the Hindu goddess of time, change and destruction, Kali.

== Species ==
There are currently seven recognized species in this genus:

- Kali colubrina M. R. S. de Melo, 2008
- Kali falx M. R. S. de Melo, 2008
- Kali indica Lloyd, 1909
- Kali kerberti (M. C. W. Weber, 1913)
- Kali macrodon (Norman, 1929)
- Kali macrura (A. E. Parr, 1933)
- Kali parri R. K. Johnson & Cohen, 1974
