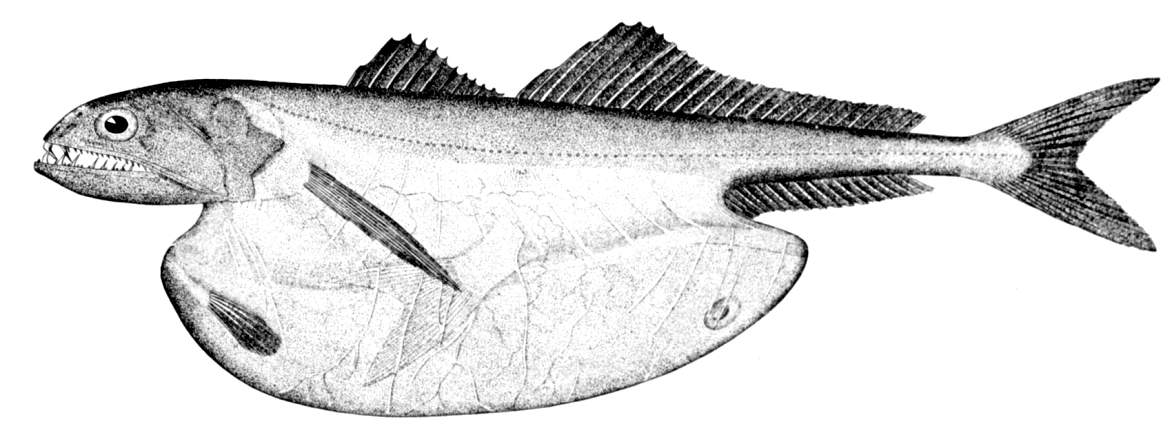
- Black Swallower (C. niger)

Scientific classification
- Kingdom: Animalia
- Phylum: Chordata
- Class: Actinopterygii
- Division: Teleostei
- Order: Scombriformes
- Family: Chiasmodontidae
- Genus: Chiasmodon; J. Y. Johnson, 1864

Type species
- Chiasmodon niger J. Y. Johnson, 1864

Synonyms
- Chiasmodus Günther, 1864; Ponerodon Alcock, 1890

= Chiasmodon =

Genus of ray-finned fishes

Chiasmodon is a genus of snaketooth fishes.

== Species ==
The currently recognized species in this genus are:

- Chiasmodon asper M. R. S. de Melo, 2009
- Chiasmodon braueri M. C. W. Weber, 1913
- Chiasmodon harteli M. R. S. de Melo, 2009
- Chiasmodon lavenbergi Prokofiev, 2008
- Chiasmodon microcephalus Norman, 1929
- Chiasmodon niger J. Y. Johnson, 1864 (black swallower)
- Chiasmodon pluriradiatus A. E. Parr, 1933
- Chiasmodon subniger Garman, 1899
