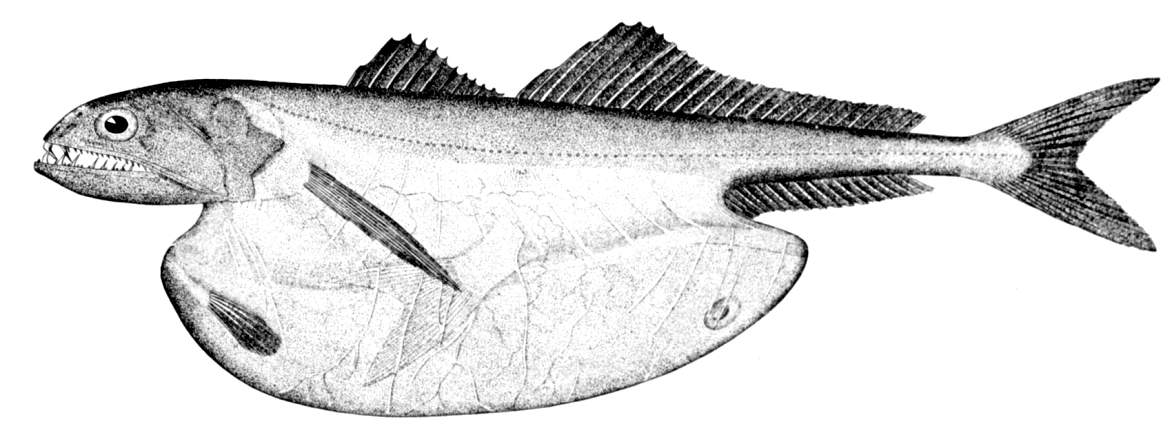
- Black swallower, Chiasmodon niger

Scientific classification
- Kingdom: Animalia
- Phylum: Chordata
- Class: Actinopterygii
- Order: Scombriformes
- Suborder: Scombroidei
- Family: Chiasmodontidae; T. N. Gill, 1883

Genera
- Chiasmodon; Dysalotus; Kali; Pseudoscopelus †Bannikovichthys

= Chiasmodontidae =

Chiasmodontidae Temporal range: Middle Miocene to present

Family of ray-finned fishes

The Chiasmodontidae, snaketooth fishes or swallowers, are a family of deep-sea predatory ray-finned fishes, part of the order Scombriformes, that are found in all oceans.

As suggested by their common name, they are characterized by their ability to engulf prey larger than themselves, due to their highly distensible stomachs.

== Taxonomy ==
They are closely related to tunas & mackerels (Scombridae), with both families belonging to the suborder Scombroidei. They were formerly placed in the paraphyletic group "Trachinoidei".

=== Genera ===
The following genera are known:

- Chiasmodon Johnson, 1864
- Dysalotus MacGilchrist, 1905
- Kali Lloyd, 1909
- Pseudoscopelus Lütken, 1892

In addition, the extinct fossil genus †Bannikovichthys Carnevale, 2007 is known from the Middle Miocene (Serravallian) of Italy. This genus appears to be more basal than the extant genera. Another species that was previously assigned to this family, "Pseudoscopelus grossheimi" from the Early Oligocene, is now known to be an early crocodile toothfish, Champsodon grossheimi Daniltshenko, 1960.

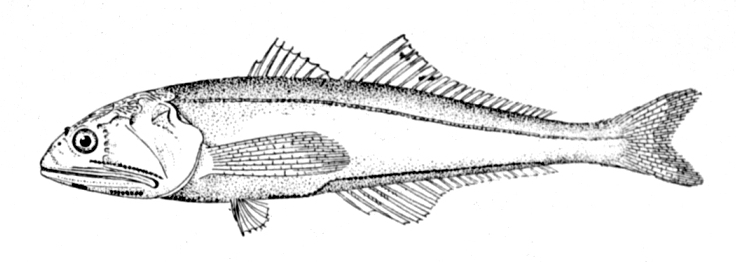
Pseudoscopelus scriptus

== Sources ==
- "Chiasmodontidae". Integrated Taxonomic Information System.
- Melo, M. R. S. (2009). Revision of the Genus Chiasmodon (Acanthomorpha: Chiasmodontidae), with the Description of Two New Species. Copeia, 2009(3), 583–608.
- Rodrigues-Oliviera, I., Pasa, R., Menegidio, F., & Kavalco, K. (2022, June 24). Characterization of six new complete mitochondrial genomes of Chiasmodontidae (Scombriformes, Percomorpha) and considerations about the phylogenetic relationships of the family.
