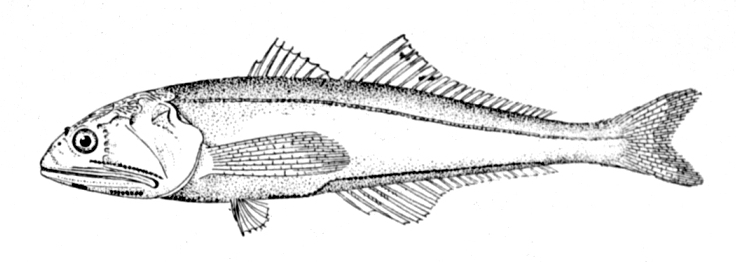
- P. scriptus

Scientific classification
- Domain: Eukaryota
- Kingdom: Animalia
- Phylum: Chordata
- Class: Actinopterygii
- Order: Scombriformes
- Family: Chiasmodontidae
- Genus: Pseudoscopelus; Lütken, 1892

Type species
- Pseudoscopelus scriptus Lütken, 1892

Synonyms
- Myersiscus Fowler, 1934

= Pseudoscopelus =

Genus of ray-finned fishes

Pseudoscopelus is a genus of snaketooth fishes.

== Species ==
There are currently 16 recognized species in this genus:

- Pseudoscopelus altipinnis A. E. Parr, 1933
- Pseudoscopelus aphos Prokofiev & Kukuev, 2005
- Pseudoscopelus astronesthidens Prokofiev & Kukuev, 2006
- Pseudoscopelus australis Prokofiev & Kukuev, 2006
- Pseudoscopelus bothrorrhinos M. R. S. de Melo, H. J. Walker & Klepadlo, 2007
- Pseudoscopelus cephalus Fowler, 1934
- Pseudoscopelus cordilluminatus M. R. S. de Melo, 2010
- Pseudoscopelus lavenbergi M. R. S. de Melo, H. J. Walker & Klepadlo, 2007
- Pseudoscopelus obtusifrons (Fowler, 1934)
- Pseudoscopelus odontoglossum M. R. S. de Melo, 2010
- Pseudoscopelus parini Prokofiev & Kukuev, 2006
- Pseudoscopelus paxtoni M. R. S. de Melo, 2010
- Pseudoscopelus pierbartus Spitz, Quéro & Vayne, 2007
- Pseudoscopelus sagamianus S. Tanaka (I), 1908
- Pseudoscopelus scriptus Lütken, 1892
- Pseudoscopelus scutatus G. Krefft, 1971
