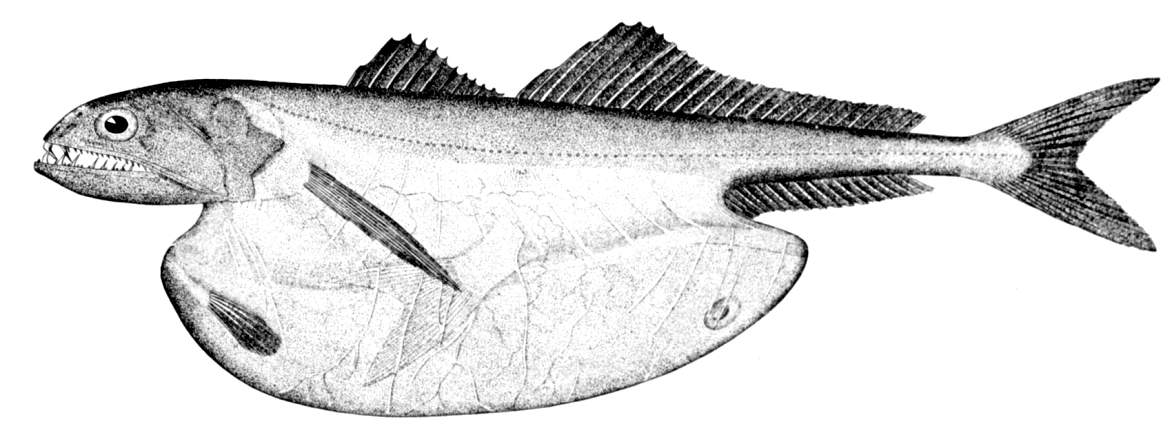

Conservation status
- Least Concern (IUCN 3.1)

Scientific classification
- Kingdom: Animalia
- Phylum: Chordata
- Class: Actinopterygii
- Order: Scombriformes
- Family: Chiasmodontidae
- Genus: Chiasmodon
- Species: C. niger

Binomial name
- Chiasmodon niger J. Y. Johnson, 1864

Synonyms
- Chiasmodon bolangeri Osório, 1909; Chiasmodus niger (Johnson, 1863); Ponerodon vastator Alcock, 1890

= Black swallower =

Species of fish

The black swallower (Chiasmodon niger) is a species of deep sea fish in the family Chiasmodontidae. It is known for its ability to swallow fish larger than itself.

It has a worldwide distribution in tropical and subtropical waters, in the mesopelagic and bathypelagic zones at a depth of 700–2,745 m (2,297–9,006 ft). It is a very common and widespread ocean fish; of its genus, it is the most common species in the North Atlantic.

== Description ==
The black swallower is a small fish, averaging between 15 and 20 cm (5.9 and 7.9 in), with a maximum known length of 25 cm (9.8 in). The body is elongated and compressed, without scales, and is a uniform brownish-black in color. Its head is long, with a blunt snout, moderately sized eyes, and a large mouth. The lower jaw protrudes past the upper; both jaws are lined with a single row of sharp, depressible teeth, which interlock when the mouth is closed. The first three teeth in each jaw are enlarged into canines.

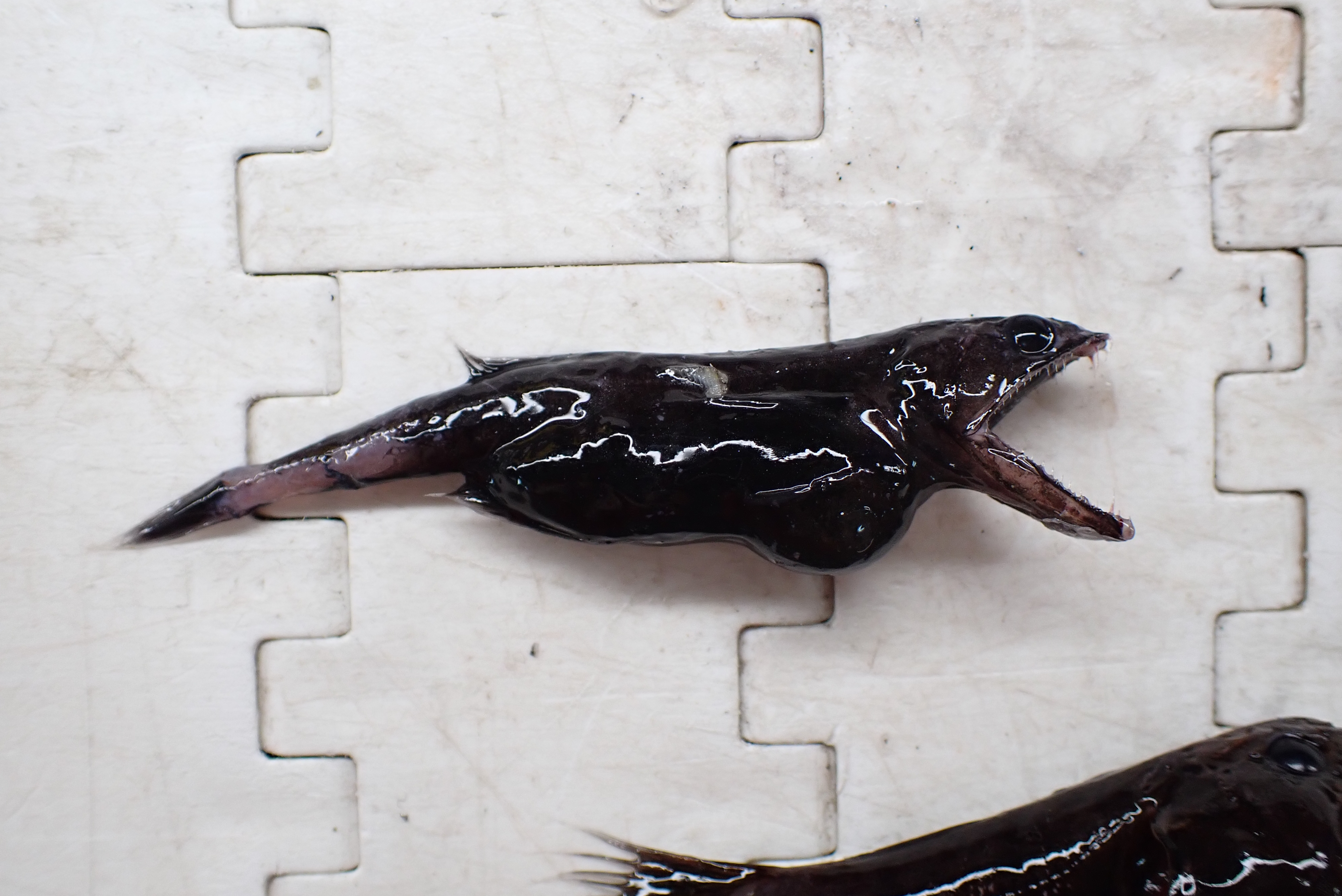
A specimen of C. niger. The stomach is distended, however this is due to barotrauma, not the ingestion of prey.

A small lower spine occurs on the preoperculum. The pectoral fins are long, with 12–14 (usually 13) rays; the pelvic fins are small and contain five rays. Of the two dorsal fins, the first is spiny with 10–12 spines, and the second is longer with one spine and 26–29 soft rays. The anal fin contains one spine and 26–29 soft rays. The caudal fin is forked with 9 rays. The lateral line is continuous with two pores per body segment.

== Dentition ==
The black swallower has a unique set of teeth. Specifically, it has fangs that are incurred and almost fully straight. Usually, the fish has multiple fangs, whereas the second one tends to be the largest. The black swallower also has mobile fangs, which means that these fangs are loose in their sockets, and can help in damaging and chewing prey.

== Feeding ==
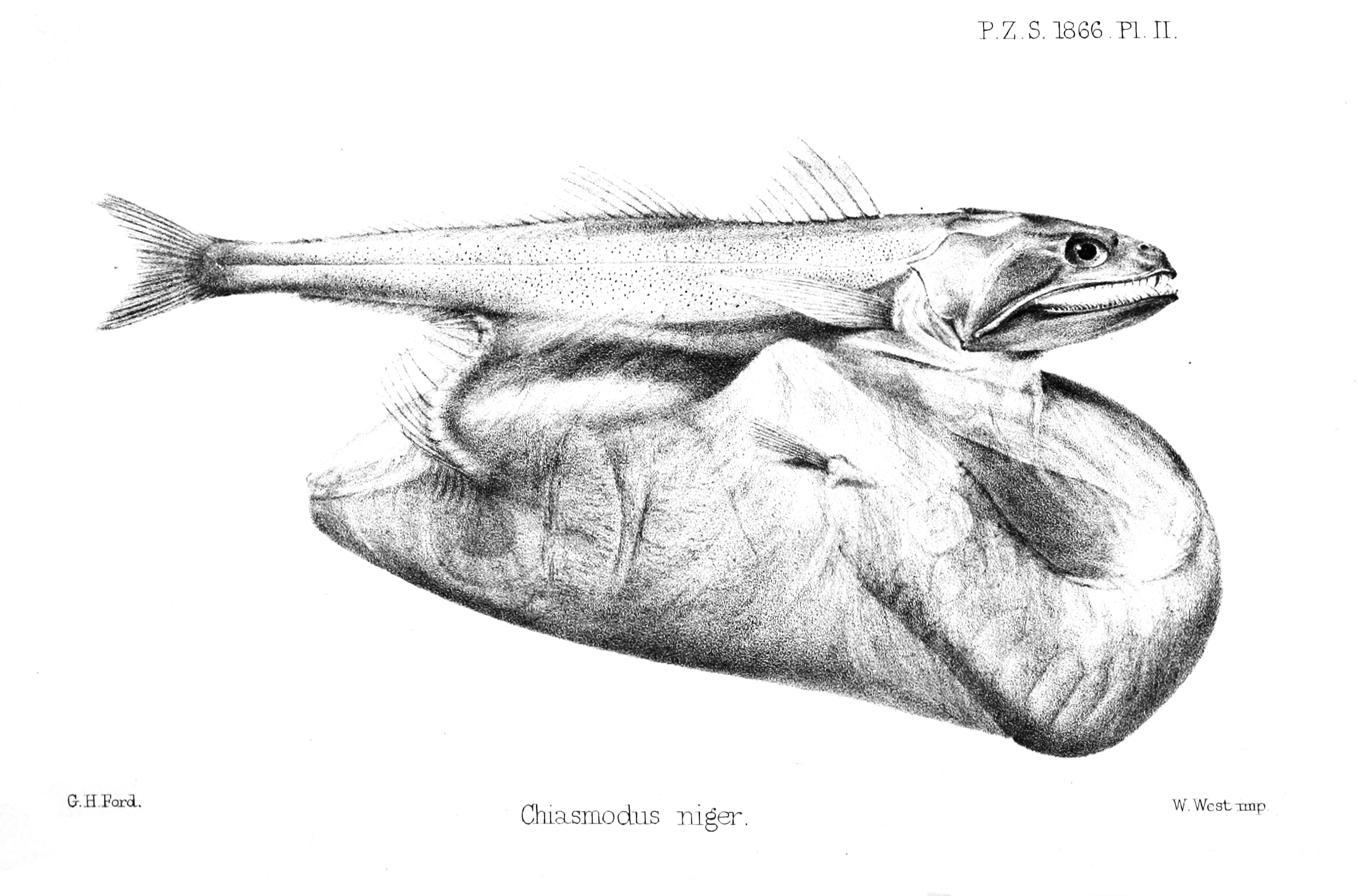

The black swallower feeds on bony fish and cephalopods, which are swallowed whole. With its greatly distensible stomach, it is capable of swallowing prey over twice its length and 10 times its mass. Its upper jaws are articulated with the skull at the front via the suspensorium, which allows the jaws to swing down and encompass objects larger than the swallower's head. Theodore Gill speculated that the swallower seizes prey fish by the tail, and then "walks" its jaws over the prey until it is fully coiled inside the stomach.

Black swallowers have been found to have swallowed fish so large that they could not be digested before decomposition set in, and the resulting release of gases forced the swallower to the ocean surface. This is, in fact, how most known specimens came to be collected. In 2007, a black swallower measuring 19 cm (7.5 in) long was found dead off of Grand Cayman. Its stomach contained a snake mackerel (Gempylus serpens) 86 cm (34 in) long, or four and a half times its own length.

== Reproduction ==
Reproduction is oviparous; the eggs are pelagic and measure 1.1–1.3 mm (0.043–0.051 in) in diameter and contain a clear oil globule and six dark pigment patches, which become distributed along the newly hatched larva from in front of the eyes to the tip of the notochord. These patches eventually disappear and the body darkens overall to black. The eggs are mostly found in winter off South Africa; juveniles have been found from April to August off Bermuda.

The larvae and juveniles are covered in small, projecting spinules.
