= Archibald Currie MacGilchrist =

British Army medical officer and naturalist from Scotland

Archibald Currie MacGilchrist (born Killarrow, on the island of Islay in Argyllshire 24 May 1872 - died Calcutta, India 14 May 1948) was a British Army medical officer and naturalist from Scotland. He graduated as a Master of Arts from the University of Glasgow in 1894. In 1898 he graduated from the University of Edinburgh as a Vans Dunlop scholar and a M.B.Ch.B, later gaining a D.Sc. in 1911. On 27 January 1900 he was appointed a lieutenant in the Indian Medical Service of the British Army, on 27 January 1903 he was promoted to captain, by 1911 he was a major. In 1927 he retired on his 50th birthday with the rank of lieutenant colonel. He was attached to the 7th Lancers as part of the No. 57 Native Field Hospital, during the Boxer Rebellion and received the China War Medal for his part in the Siege of the International Legations in Peking, for which he also received the Military Order of the Dragon from the Chinese Government. His scientific work included research on quinine and its salts and he was Surgeon-Naturalist on board R.I.M.S. Investigator. His other scientific interest was the decapod crustaceans of the Indian Ocean. His fellow Indian Medical Service officer, Alfred William Alcock. named an anomuran, Pylocheles (Bathycheles) macgilchristi in his honour. McGilchrist named the deep see fish Dysalotus alcocki in honour of Alcock in gratitude for the guidance and help he gave MacGilchrist. After retiring MacGilchrist appears to have remained in India and he died of unknown causes in Calcutta on 14 May 1948 at the age of 75.

== See also ==
List of Indian Medical Service officers
