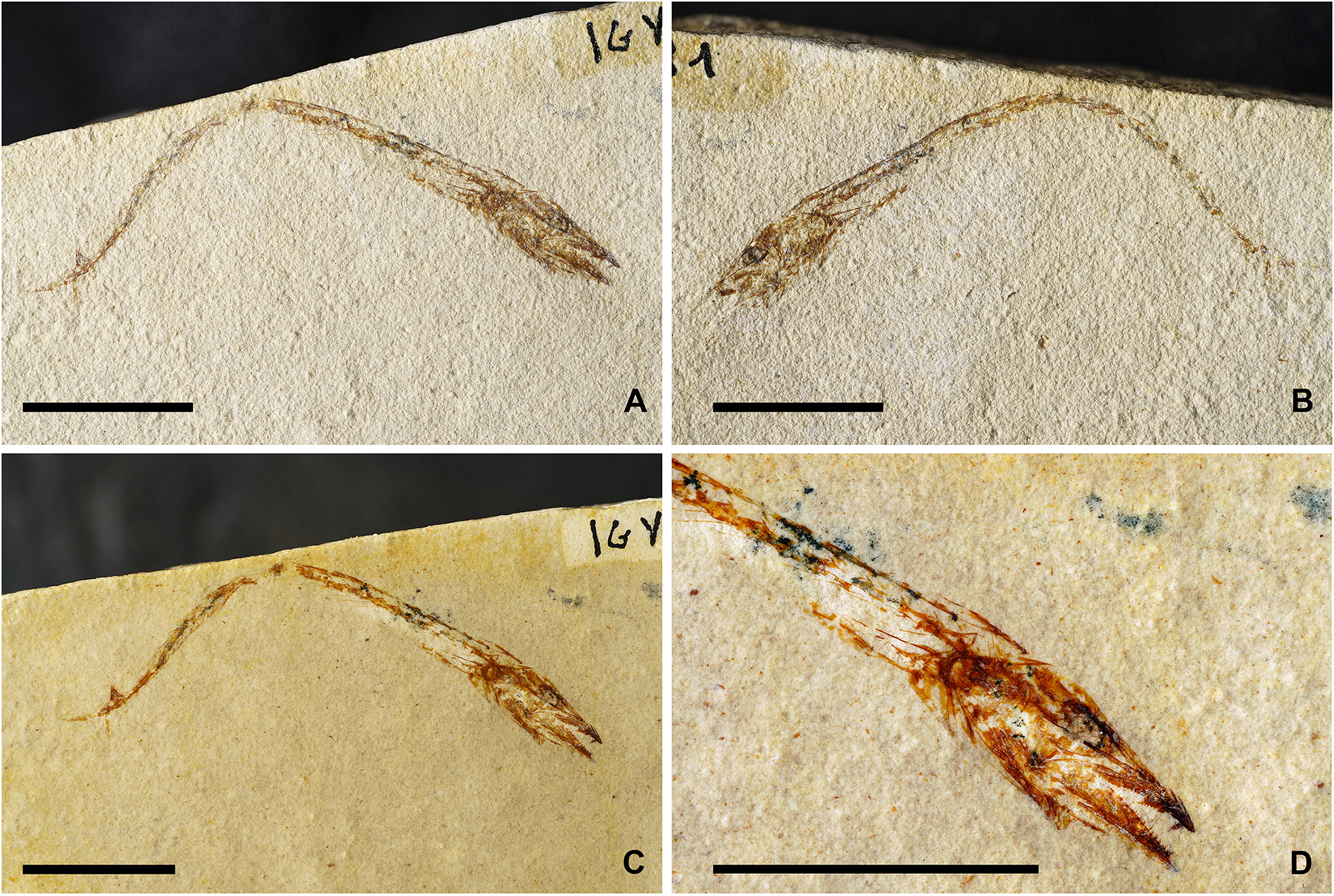
- Holotype under natural light (A, B) and coated in alcohol for improved visualization (C, D)

Scientific classification
- Kingdom: Animalia
- Phylum: Chordata
- Class: Actinopterygii
- Division: Teleostei
- Order: Scombriformes
- Family: Trichiuridae
- Genus: †Exeomastix; Calzoni, Giusberti & Carnevale, 2026
- Species: †E. zabimaru

Binomial name
- †Exeomastix zabimaru (Calzoni, Giusberti & Carnevale in Calzoni et al., 2026)

Synonyms
- Eomastix Calzoni, Giusberti & Carnevale in Calzoni et al., 2026 (non Jaschhof, 2009; preoccupied)

= Exeomastix =

Exeomastix Temporal range: Early Eocene (late Ypresian), ~50.4–49.11 Ma

Genus of extinct fish

Exeomastix (lit. 'former dawn whip') is an extinct genus of cutlassfish (family Trichiuridae) known from the early Eocene (Ypresian age) Chiusole Formation of Italy. The genus contains a single species, Exeomastix zabimaru, known from a skeleton preserved on a slab and counterslab. It is characterized by its thin, ribbon-like body form, a fang at the front of the upper jaw, and a reduced, forked caudal fin. Exeomastix is the oldest trichiurid in the fossil record known from articulated remains.

== Discovery and naming ==
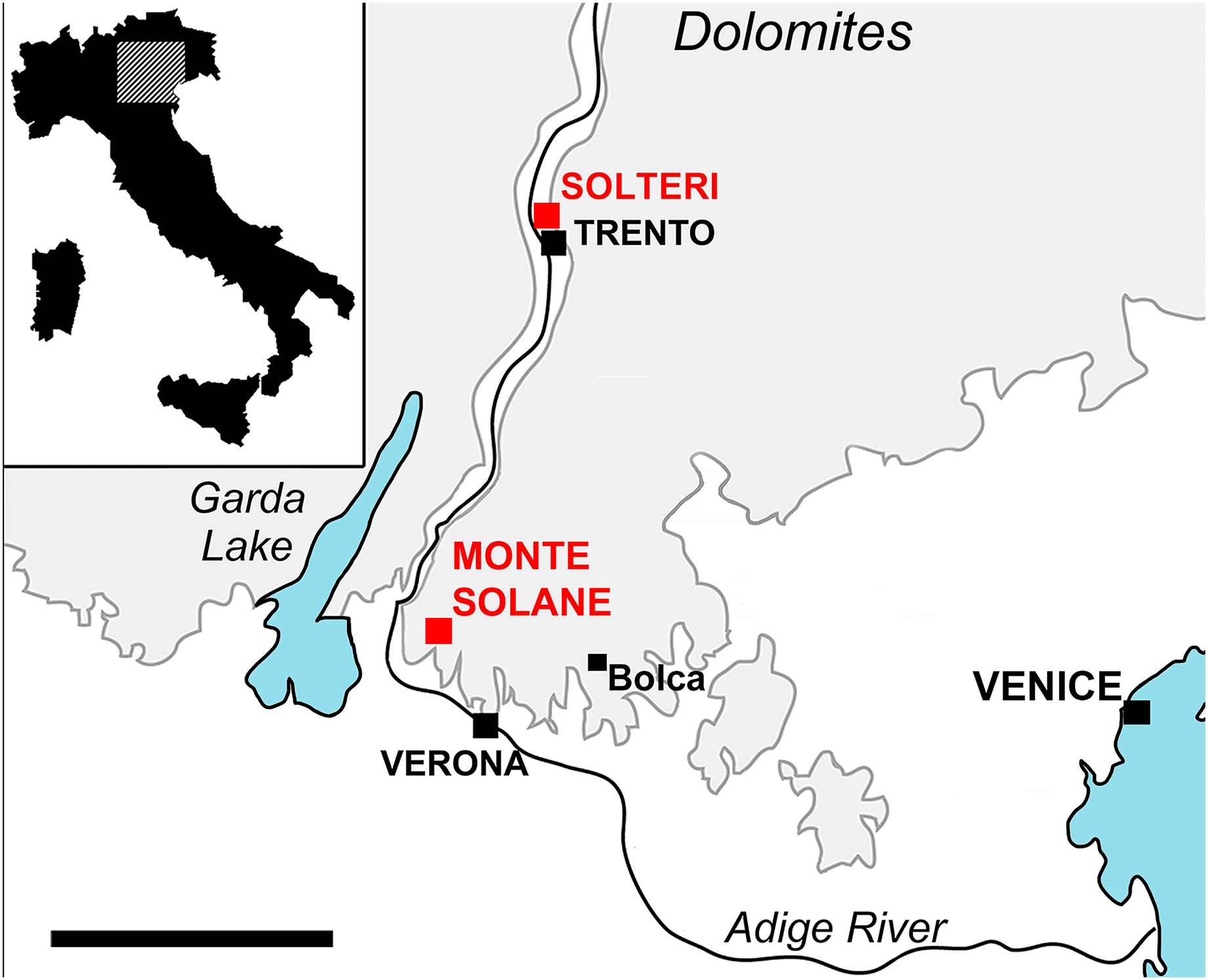
Type locality (Monte Solane) in Verona, Italy

The Exeomastix fossil material was discovered at the Monte Solane locality, representing lagerstätte outcrops of the Chiusole Formation near the village of Sant'Ambrogio di Valpolicella in Verona, Italy. The specimen is accessioned as part of the General Inventory of the Verona Province (IGVR; including the Museo di Storia Naturale di Verona and Antiquarium of San Giorgio di Valpolicella). It consists of a nearly complete skeleton including the skull, preserved as a part and counterpart, catalogued together as IGVR 64081 and IGVR 64082.

An initial report on the Monte Solane fish fossil assemblage in 2014 figured IGVR 64082, identifying it as Trichiuridae gen. indet. cf. Anenchelum (an indeterminate trichiurid genus comparable to Anenchelum).

In March 2026, Pietro Calzoni and colleagues described Eomastix zabimaru as a new genus and species of early cutlassfish based on these fossil remains, designating IGVR 64081–64082 as the holotype specimen. This initially proposed generic name, Eomastix, combines the Greek words ἠώς (ēṓs), meaning 'dawn', and μάστιξ (mắstīx), meaning 'whip'. The former root alludes to both the ancient status of this taxon in relation to other trichiurids (at the 'dawn' of the evolution of the clade), as well as its discovery in rocks dated to the Eocene, while the latter root alludes to its thin, slender form. This genus name was preoccupied by an insect of the same name, so a replacement name had to be implemented. In July 2026, Calzoni et al. proposed the name Exeomastix to replace the unintentional initial homonym. The added Latin prefix ex-, meaning 'former', alludes to the necessary replacement of the initially proposed (and preoccupied) name, Eomastix. The specific name, zabimaru, is a Japanese word meaning 'snake tail', referencing the very thin caudal (tail) region of the species.

Exeomastix is the earliest trichiurid known from articulated skeletal remains in the fossil record. The earliest putative trichiurid fossils are isolated teeth from the Paleocene (Paleogene epoch preceding the Eocene). Meanwhile, the next oldest articulated trichiurid is from the Lutetian (Eocene age following the Ypresian).

== Description ==
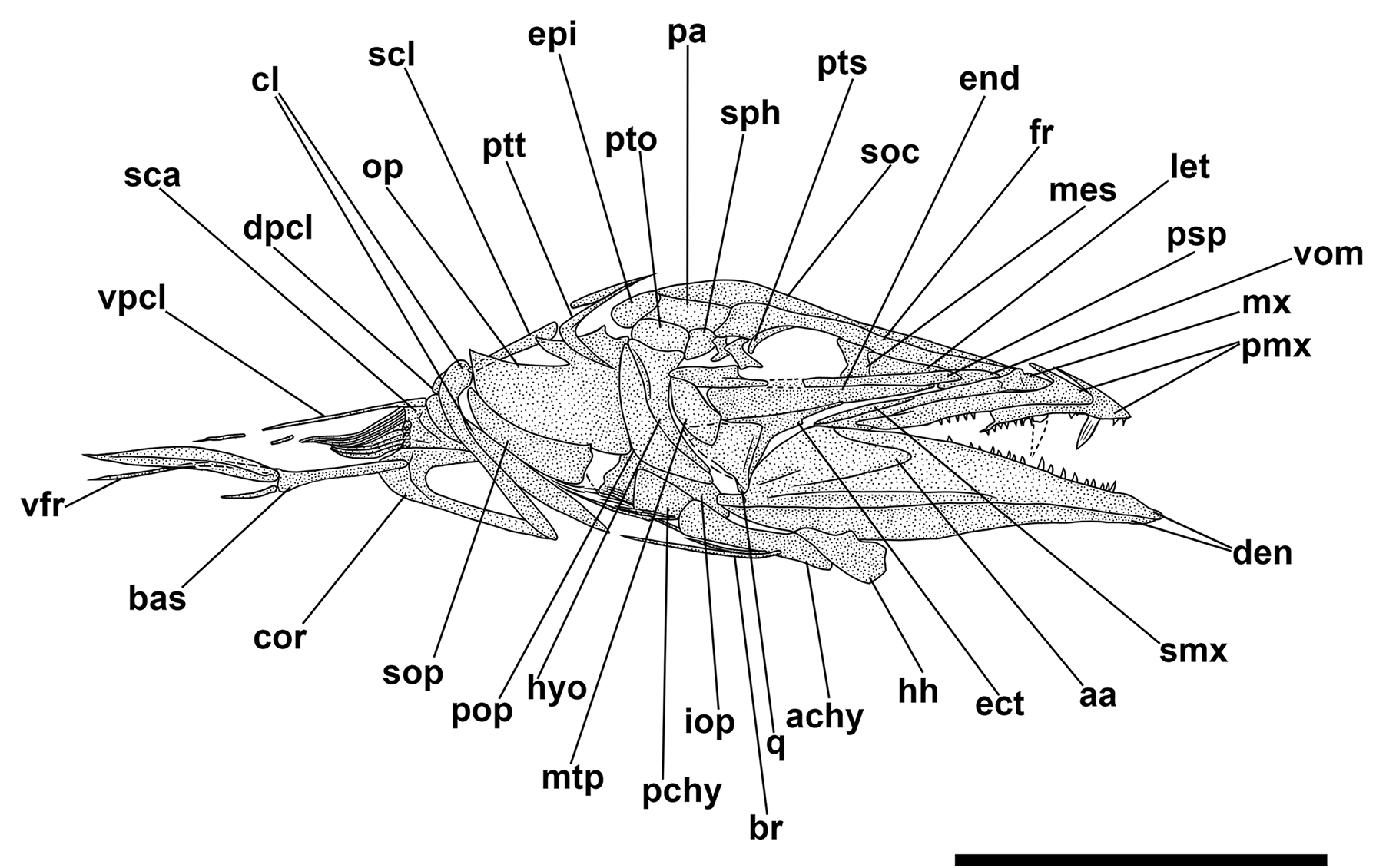
Reconstructed skull of Exeomastix

Exeomastix is a small member of the family Trichiuridae (cutlassfish) with a long, compressed, ribbon-like body. The E. zabimaru holotype has a standard length (SL) of 41.1 millimetres (1.62 in). None of the squamation (scale covering) is preserved in this specimen. The mouth is large, and the lower jaw projects past the upper jaw. The upper jaw has small teeth with a large fang in the premaxilla toward the front, while the lower jaw only has small conical teeth. It has 37 vertebrae in the vertebral column. The dorsal fins are continuous, running along the length of the body, comprising a spiny dorsal fin with 15 rays toward the front, separated by a small notch from the soft dorsal fin at the rear, which has at least 15 rays. The anal fin, which has at least 14 rays, is positioned approximately opposite the soft dorsal fin.

Exeomastix has a forked, albeit notably reduced, caudal fin, which contrasts with the filamentous condition of this fin in many extant trichiurids, including Demissolinea, Eupleurogrammus, Lepturacanthus, Tentoriceps, and Trichiurus. The pelvic girdle and associated fin are developed, contrasting with some extant trichiurids, in which it is absent (Lepturacanthus and Trichiurus) or reduced to a small spine (Aphanopus, Evoxymetopon, and Lepidopus).
