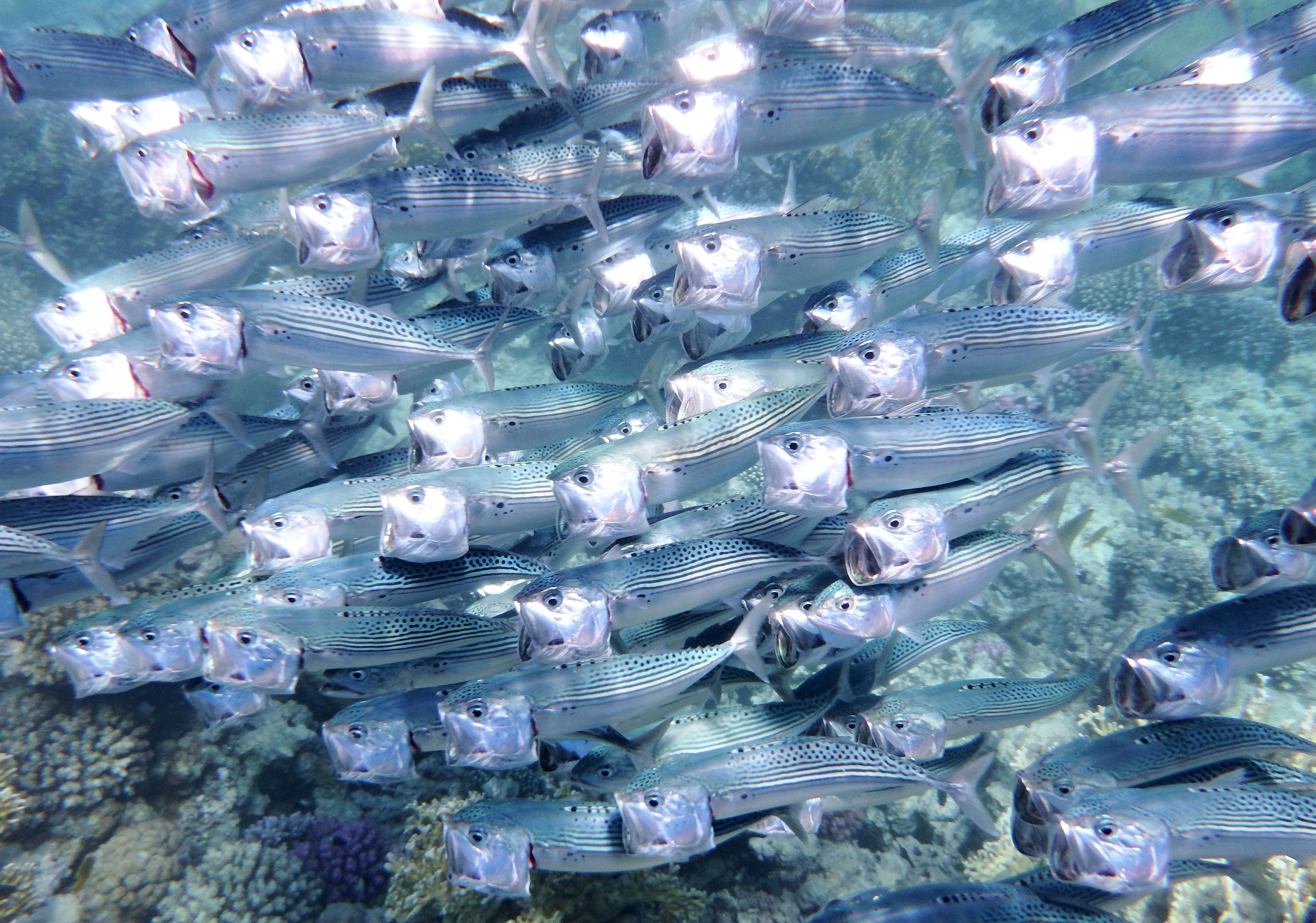
- A school of Indian mackerel Rastrelliger kanagurta

Scientific classification
- Kingdom: Animalia
- Phylum: Chordata
- Class: Actinopterygii
- Division: Teleostei
- Order: Scombriformes
- Suborder: Scombroidei

Families
- See text

= Scombroidei =

Scombroidei Temporal range: Danian–Recent

Suborder of fishes

Scombroidei or Scombrales is a suborder or infraorder of the order Scombriformes or suborder Scombroidei. The suborder or infraorder includes the tunas, mackerel and snake-mackerels. Regular scombrids are observed to have large heads, eyes, and mouths. In most cases, the second dorsal fin will develop before the development of the first.

The earliest known members of the group are unnamed members of Scombridae and Trichiuroidea from the Paleocene (Danian) strata from the Dakhla Formation (Egypt) and the scombrid Landanichthys from the Selandian of Angola, although potential fossil teeth of Eutrichiurides are slightly older.

== Taxonomy ==
Originally, both Scombroidei and Stromateoidei were placed under the order Perciformes, but both taxa are now lumped together into the order Scombriformes or alternatively ranked as infraorders (Stromateales and Scombrales) under the suborder Scombroidei within the order Syngnathiformes. Most modern taxonomic authorities use the former treatment.

The following taxonomic classification is used by Eschmeyer's Catalog of Fishes:

- Suborder Scombroidei
  - Family Pomatomidae Gill, 1863 (bluefishes)
  - Family Icosteidae Jordan & Gilbert, 1880 (ragfishes)
  - Family Arripidae Gill, 1893 (Australian salmons)
  - Family Chiasmodontidae Jordan & Gilbert, 1883 (swallowers)
  - Family Scombridae Rafinesque, 1815 (mackerels, tunas and bonitos)
  - Family Caristiidae Gill & Smith, 1905 (manefishes)
  - Family Bramidae Bonaparte, 1831 (pomfrets)
  - Superfamily Trichiuroidea
    - Family Scombrolabracidae Fowler, 1925 (longfin escolar)
    - Family Gempylidae Gill, 1862 (snake mackerels)
    - Family Trichiuridae Rafinesque, 1810 (cutlassfishes)

Some authors consider this treatment paraphyletic with respect to Stromateoidei.

Several extinct taxa are also known:

- Suborder Scombroidei
  - Genus ?†Ardiodus White, 1931 (early Eocene)
  - Genus †Duplexdens Monsch, 2004 (early Eocene)
  - Genus †Scombramphodon Woodward, 1901 (early Eocene to Oligocene)
  - Genus †Sphyraenodus Agassiz, 1844 (early Eocene)
  - Genus †Woodwardella Casier, 1966 (early Eocene)
  - Superfamily Trichiuroidea
    - Genus †Abadzekhia Bannikov, 1985 (early Oligocene)
    - Genus †Anenchelum de Blainville, 1818 (middle Eocene to late Miocene)
    - Genus †Argestichthys Prokofiev, 2002 (earliest Eocene)
    - Genus †Chelifichthys Carnevale, 2006 (late Miocene)
    - Genus †Eutrichiurides Casier, 1944 (early Paleocene to early Oligocene, potentially a cutlassfish)
    - Genus †Exeomastix Calzoni, Giusberti & Carnevale, 2026 (early Eocene)
    - Genus †Macroynis Beckett, Giles, Johanson & Friedman, 2018 (early Eocene)
    - Genus †Musculopedunculus Parin & Astakhov 2007 (early Oligocene)
    - Family †Euzaphlegidae Daniltshenko, 1960 (early Eocene to late Miocene)
