= Ardiodus =

Ardiodus Temporal range: Late Paleocene to Early Eocene

Scientific classification
- Domain: Eukaryota
- Kingdom: Animalia
- Phylum: Chordata
- Class: Actinopterygii
- Order: Scombriformes
- Suborder: Scombroidei
- Genus: †Ardiodus; White, 1931
- Species: †A. mariotti

Binomial name
- †Ardiodus mariotti White, 1931

Extinct genus of ray-finned fishes

Ardiodus is an extinct genus of prehistoric marine scombroid fish from the late Paleocene (Thanetian) to the early Eocene (Ypresian). It contains a single known species, A. mariotti from the London Clay formation of the United Kingdom and the Ouled Abdoun Basin of Morocco.

It is only known from its teeth, which show similarities to Gempylidae, Trichiuridae, Scomberomorini, and the extinct Eocoelopoma. Thus, it is likely to be a scombroid, although its exact placement is uncertain.
