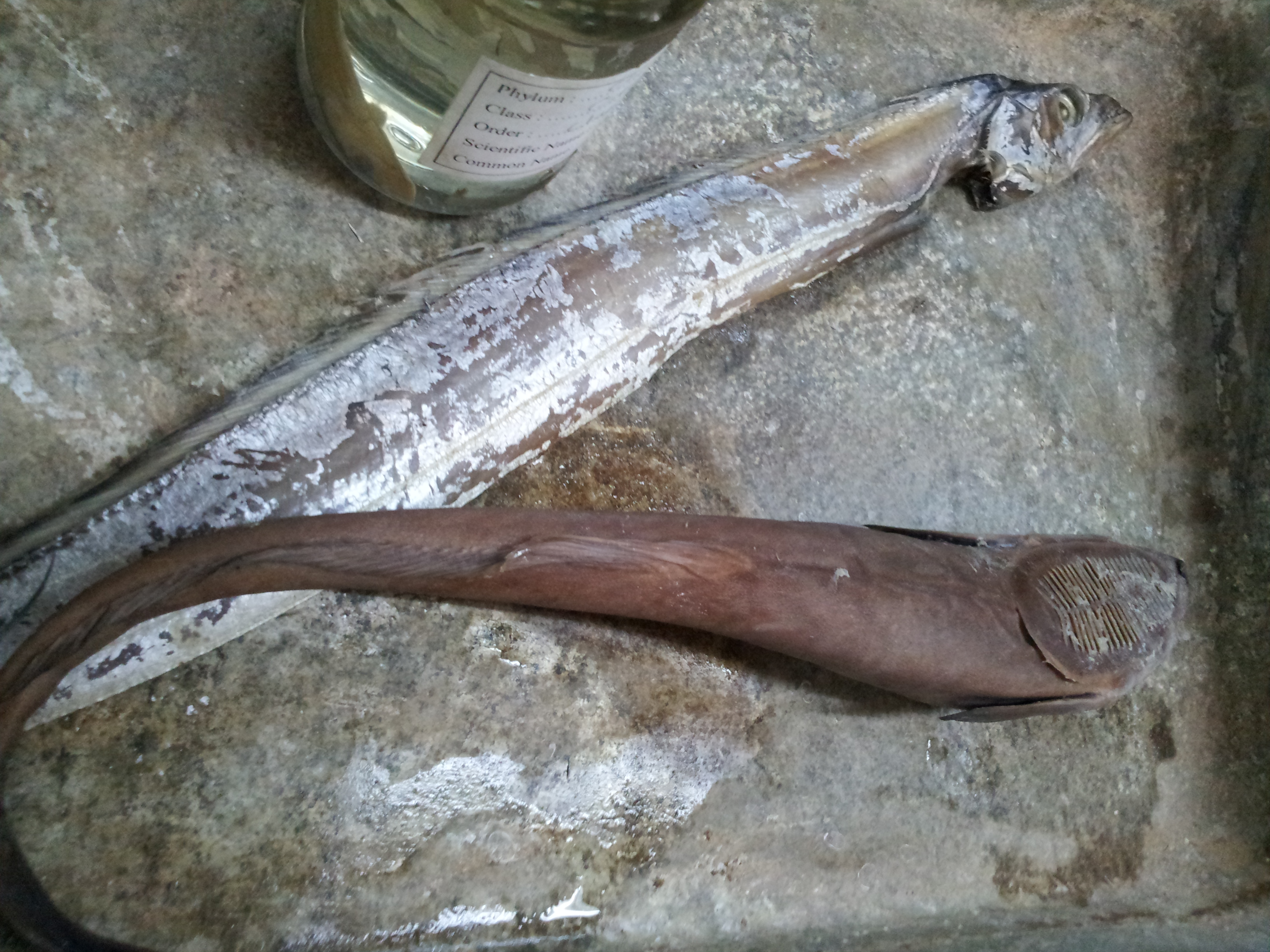
- Preserved Savalai hairtail (left) with a remora (right)

Scientific classification
- Kingdom: Animalia
- Phylum: Chordata
- Class: Actinopterygii
- Order: Scombriformes
- Family: Trichiuridae
- Genus: Lepturacanthus
- Species: L. savala

Binomial name
- Lepturacanthus savala (Cuvier, 1828)

Synonyms
- Trichiurus savala Cuvier, 1829; Trichiurus armatus Gray, 1831

= Lepturacanthus savala =

Species of fish

The Savalai hairtail, Lepturacanthus savala, also known as small-head hairtail, is a species of cutlassfish native to the Indian Ocean and into the west Pacific Ocean as far east as Australia. They inhabit deep waters at depths from 100 m (330 ft). The maximum length is 100.0 cm (39.4 in), and weight reaches 11.0 kg (24.3 lb). The fish comes to the surface of the water at night to catch small fish, and crustaceans, especially prawns.
