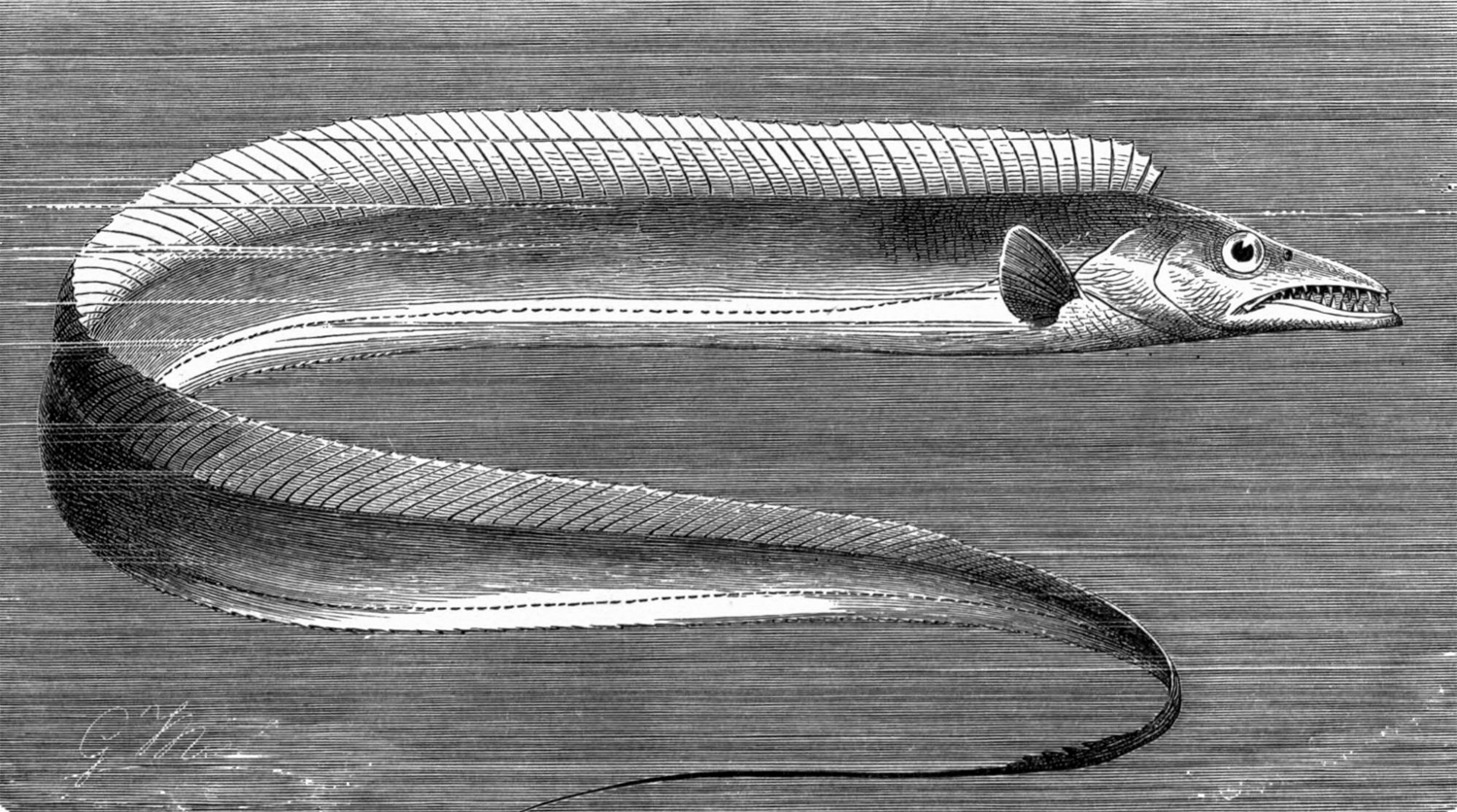

Conservation status
- Data Deficient (IUCN 3.1)

Scientific classification
- Kingdom: Animalia
- Phylum: Chordata
- Class: Actinopterygii
- Division: Teleostei
- Order: Scombriformes
- Family: Trichiuridae
- Genus: Lepidopus
- Species: L. caudatus

Binomial name
- Lepidopus caudatus (Euphrasen, 1788)

Synonyms
- Trichiurus caudatus Euphrasen, 1788; Lepidopus argenteus Bonnaterre, 1788; Trichiurus ensiformis Vandelli, 1797; Lepidopus gouanianus Lacépède, 1800; Trichiurus gladius Holten, 1802; Vandellius lusitanicus Shaw, 1803; Scarcina argyrea Rafinesque, 1810; Lepidopus peronii Risso, 1810; Ziphotheca tetradens Montagu, 1811; Lepidopus xantusi Goode & Bean, 1896; Lepidopus lex Phillipps, 1932

= Silver scabbardfish =

Species of fish

The silver scabbardfish (Lepidopus caudatus), also known as the frostfish or beltfish, is a benthopelagic cutlassfish of the family Trichiuridae found throughout the temperate seas of the world. It grows to over 2 metres (6 ft 7 in) in length.

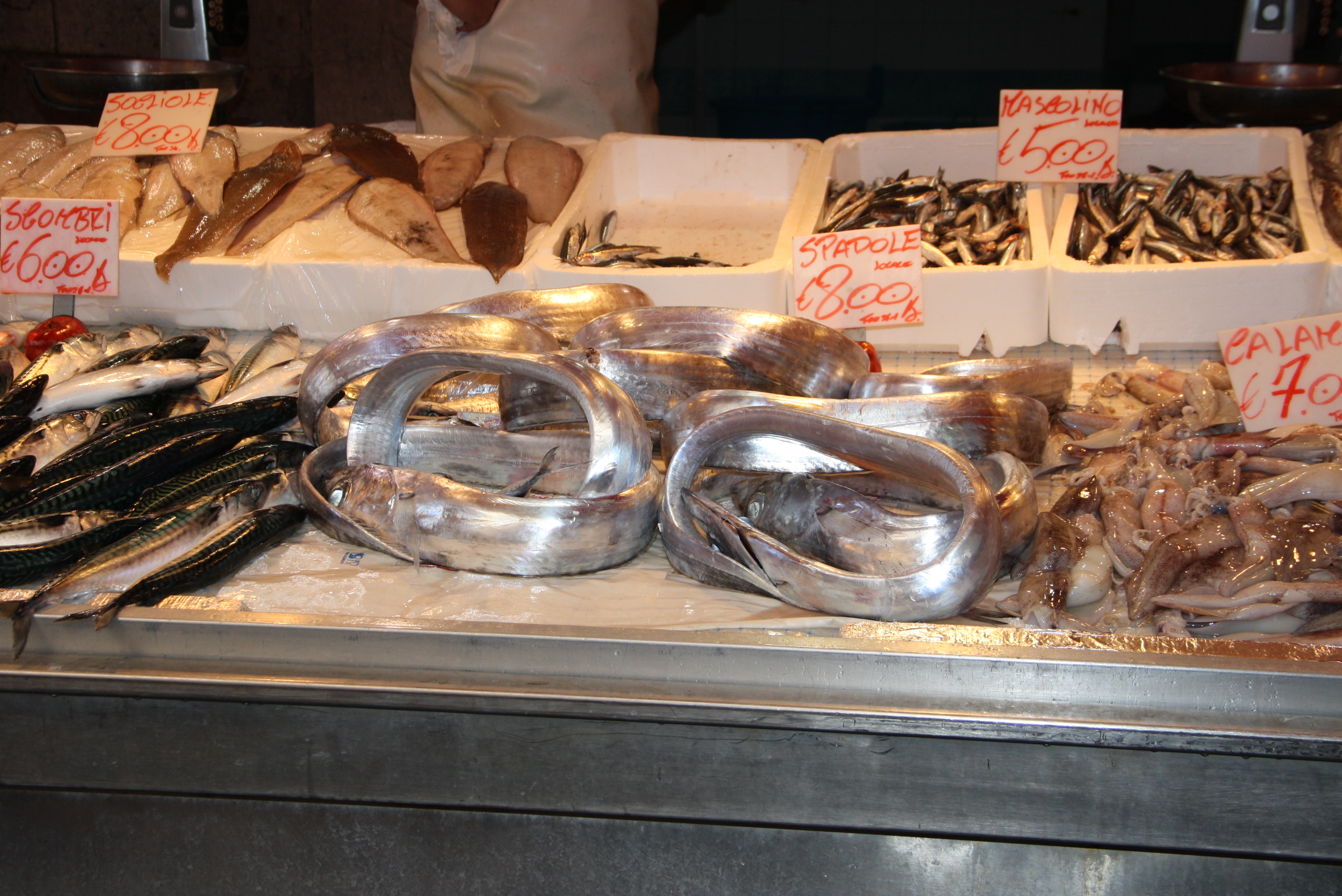
Silver scabbardfish sold in Syracuse (Italy)

== Behaviour ==
Lepidopus caudatus is known to strand itself in winter months, likely due to being caught in currents when the fish migrate closer to shore for spawning.

== In a human context ==
Lepidopus caudatus is a traditional food for the Māori people of New Zealand, known by the name pāra. The fish was not typically caught, but eaten as a supplementary food when schools washed ashore, especially common around Moeraki in Otago. Māori traditionally believed that strandings were caused by the fish chasing the Moon, while early European settlers believed that frostfish purposefully chose to end their lives by stranding themselves.
