= Beltfish =

The term beltfish can refer to either:

- Trichiurus lepturus (largehead hairtail, Atlantic cutlassfish, Pacific cutlassfish)
- Lepidopus caudatus (silver scabbardfish, frostfish, ribbonfish, scabbardfish, southern frostfish)
