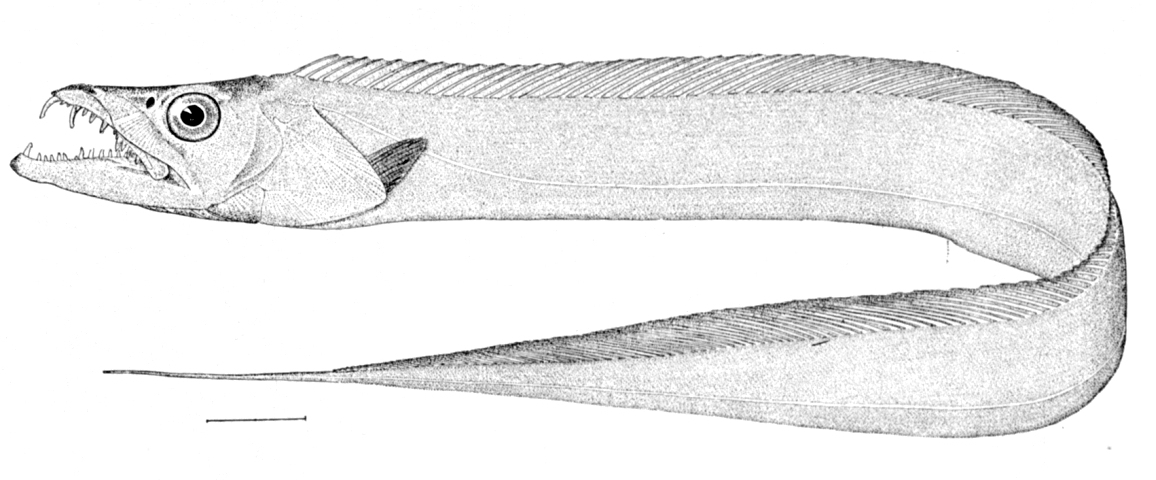
- Trichiurus lepturus

Scientific classification
- Kingdom: Animalia
- Phylum: Chordata
- Class: Actinopterygii
- Division: Teleostei
- Order: Scombriformes
- Suborder: Scombroidei
- Family: Trichiuridae; Rafinesque, 1810

Genera
- Aphanopus; Assurger; Benthodesmus; Demissolinea; Eupleurogrammus; Evoxymetopon; Lepidopus; Lepturacanthus; Tentoriceps; Trichiurus; †Anenchelum; †Eutrichiurides; †Exeomastix; †Macroynis?; †Trichiurides; See text for species.

= Cutlassfish =

Cutlassfish Temporal range: Early Eocene to present Potential Paleocene occurrence

Common name for several species of fish

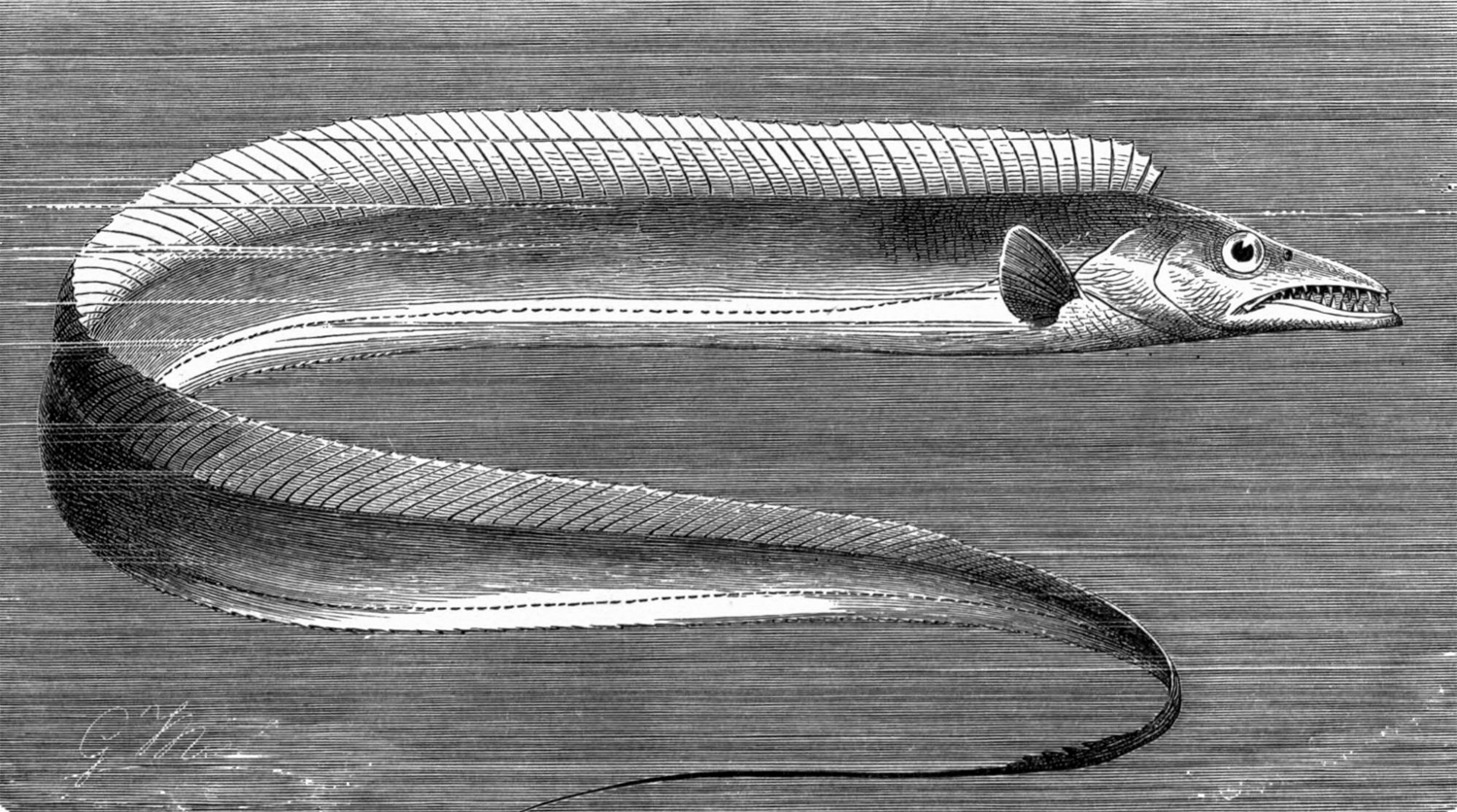
Silver scabbardfish, Lepidopus caudatus

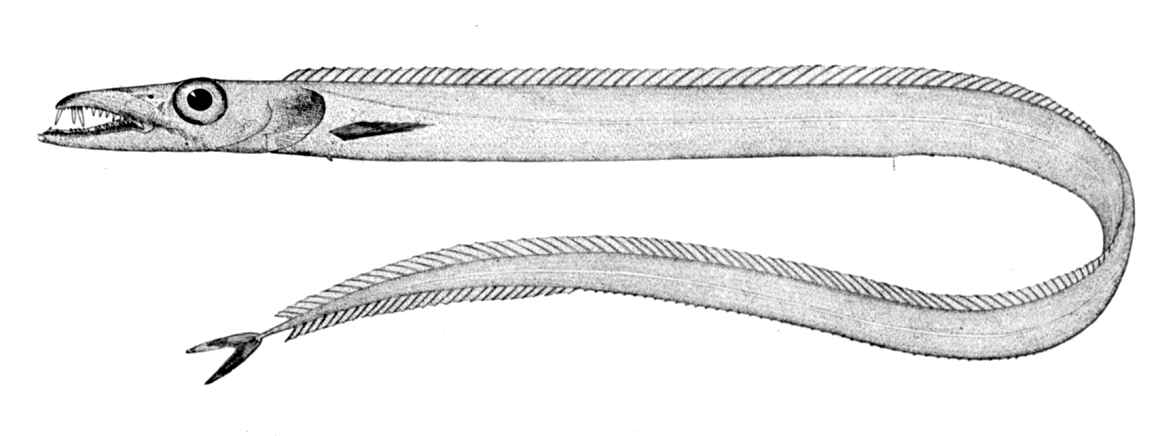
Benthodesmus simonyi

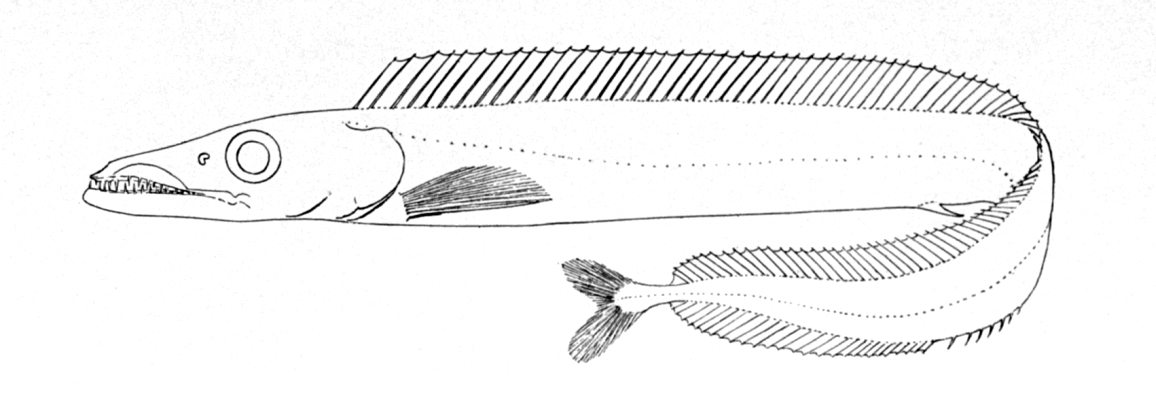
Aphanopus carbo

The cutlassfishes are about 45 species of predatory ray-finned fish in the family Trichiuridae of the order Scombriformes found in seas throughout the world. Fish of this family are long, slender, and generally steely blue or silver in colour, giving rise to their name. They have reduced or absent pelvic and caudal fins, giving them an eel-like appearance, and large fang-like teeth.

Some of the species are known as scabbardfishes or hairtails; others are called frostfishes because they appear in late autumn and early winter, around the time of the first frosts.

The earliest known remains of cutlassfish are isolated teeth assigned to Eutrichiurides from the Early Paleocene of Morocco, the United States, and Angola, although their affinities are subject to question. The earliest known body fossil of a cutlassfish is Exeomastix from the Early Eocene of Italy.

== Classification ==
This list of species follows FishBase:

- Genus †Exeomastix Calzoni, Giusberti & Carnevale, 2026 (Early Eocene of Italy)
- Subfamily Aphanopidinae Gill, 1863
  - †Genus Anenchelum (Middle Eocene to Late Miocene)
  - Genus Aphanopus
    - Aphanopus arigato Parin, 1994
    - Aphanopus beckeri Parin, 1994
    - Aphanopus capricornis Parin, 1994
    - Aphanopus carbo Lowe, 1839 (Black scabbardfish)
    - Aphanopus intermedius Parin, 1983 (Intermediate scabbardfish)
    - Aphanopus microphthalmus Norman, 1939 (Smalleye scabbardfish)
    - Aphanopus mikhailini Parin, 1983 (Mikhailin's scabbardfish)
  - Genus Benthodesmus Goode & Bean, 1882
    - Benthodesmus elongatus, Clarke, 1879 (Elongate frostfish)
    - Benthodesmus macrophthalmus, Parin & Becker, 1970 (Bigeye frostfish)
    - Benthodesmus neglectus, Parin, 1976 (Neglected frostfish)
    - Benthodesmus oligoradiatus, Parin & Becker, 1970 (Sparse-rayed frostfish)
    - Benthodesmus pacificus, Parin & Becker, 1970 (North Pacific frostfish)
    - Benthodesmus papua, Parin, 1978 (Papuan frostfish)
    - Benthodesmus simonyi, Steindachner, 1891 (Simony's frostfish)
    - Benthodesmus suluensis, Parin, 1976 (Philippine frostfish)
    - Benthodesmus tenuis, Günther, 1877 (Slender frostfish)
    - Benthodesmus tuckeri, Parin & Becker, 1970 (Tucker's frostfish)
    - Benthodesmus vityazi, Parin & Becker, 1970 (Vityaz' frostfish)
- Subfamily Lepidopodinae, Gill, 1863
  - Genus Assurger
    - Assurger anzac Alexander, 1917 (Razorback scabbardfish)
  - Genus Eupleurogrammus
    - Eupleurogrammus glossodon, (Bleeker, 1860) (Longtooth hairtail)
    - Eupleurogrammus muticus, (Gray, 1831) (Smallhead hairtail)
  - Genus Evoxymetopon
    - Evoxymetopon macrophthalmus Chakraborty, Yoshino & Iwatsuki, 2006
    - Evoxymetopon moricheni Fricke, Golani & Appelbaum-Golani, 2014
    - Evoxymetopon poeyi Günther, 1887 (Poey's scabbardfish)
    - Evoxymetopon taeniatus Gill, 1863 (Channel scabbardfish)
  - Genus Lepidopus
    - Lepidopus altifrons, Parin & Collette, 1993 (Crested scabbardfish)
    - Lepidopus calcar, Parin & Mikhailin, 1982 (Hawaiian ridge scabbardfish)
    - Lepidopus caudatus, (Euphrasen, 1788) (Silver scabbardfish)
    - Lepidopus dubius, Parin & Mikhailin, 1981 (Doubtful scabbardfish)
    - Lepidopus fitchi , Rosenblatt & Wilson, 1987 (Fitch's scabbardfish)
    - Lepidopus manis, Rosenblatt & Wilson, 1987 (Ghost scabbardfish)
  - Genus †Musculopedunculus Parin & Astakhov, 2007 (Early Oligocene of Germany)
- Subfamily Trichiurinae Rafinesque, 1810
  - Genus Demissolinea
    - Demissolinea novaeguineensis, Burhanuddin & Iwatsuki, 2003 (New Guinean hairtail)
  - Genus †Eutrichiurides (Eocene to Oligocene)
  - Genus Lepturacanthus
    - Lepturacanthus pantului, (Gupta, 1966) (Coromandel hairtail)
    - Lepturacanthus roelandti (Bleeker, 1860)
    - Lepturacanthus savala, (Cuvier, 1829) (Savalani hairtail)
  - Genus Tentoriceps
    - Tentoriceps cristatus, (Klunzinger, 1884) (Crested hairtail)
  - Genus †Trichiurides (Eocene)
  - Genus Trichiurus
    - Trichiurus auriga, Klunzinger, 1884 (Pearly hairtail)
    - Trichiurus australis Chakraborty, Burhanuddin & Iwatsuki, 2005
    - Trichiurus brevis, Wang & You, 1992 (Chinese short-tailed hairtail)
    - Trichiurus gangeticus, Gupta, 1966 (Ganges hairtail)
    - Trichiurus lepturus, Linnaeus, 1758 (Largehead hairtail)
    - Trichiurus margarites, Li, 1992
    - Trichiurus nanhaiensis, Wang & Xu, 1992
    - Trichiurus nickolensis, Burhanuddin & Iwatsuki, 2003 (Australian short-tailed hairtail)
    - Trichiurus russelli, Dutt & Thankam, 1966 (Short-tailed hairtail)
