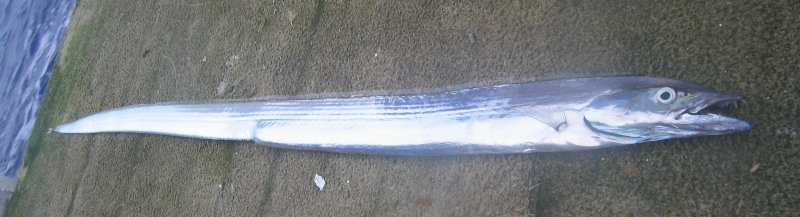

Scientific classification
- Kingdom: Animalia
- Phylum: Chordata
- Class: Actinopterygii
- Order: Scombriformes
- Family: Trichiuridae
- Genus: Assurger; Whitley, 1933
- Species: A. anzac

Binomial name
- Assurger anzac (Alexander, 1916)

Synonyms
- Assurger alexanderi Whitley, 1933; Evoxymetopon anzac Alexander, 1916

= Razorback scabbardfish =

Species of fish

The razorback scabbardfish, Assurger anzac, is a rare species of cutlassfish, family Trichiuridae, and the only member of its genus. It has been caught from scattered locations worldwide: in the Atlantic Ocean it is known from off Puerto Rico, Uruguay, and the Walvis Ridge, in the Indian Ocean it is known from off western Australia, and in the Pacific Ocean it is known from off New Guinea, southern Japan, Midway Island, California, and the Nazca and Sala y Gomez Ridges. Adults are thought to be benthopelagic, occurring at a depth of 150–400 meters (490–1,310 ft), while juveniles are found near the surface or in midwater.

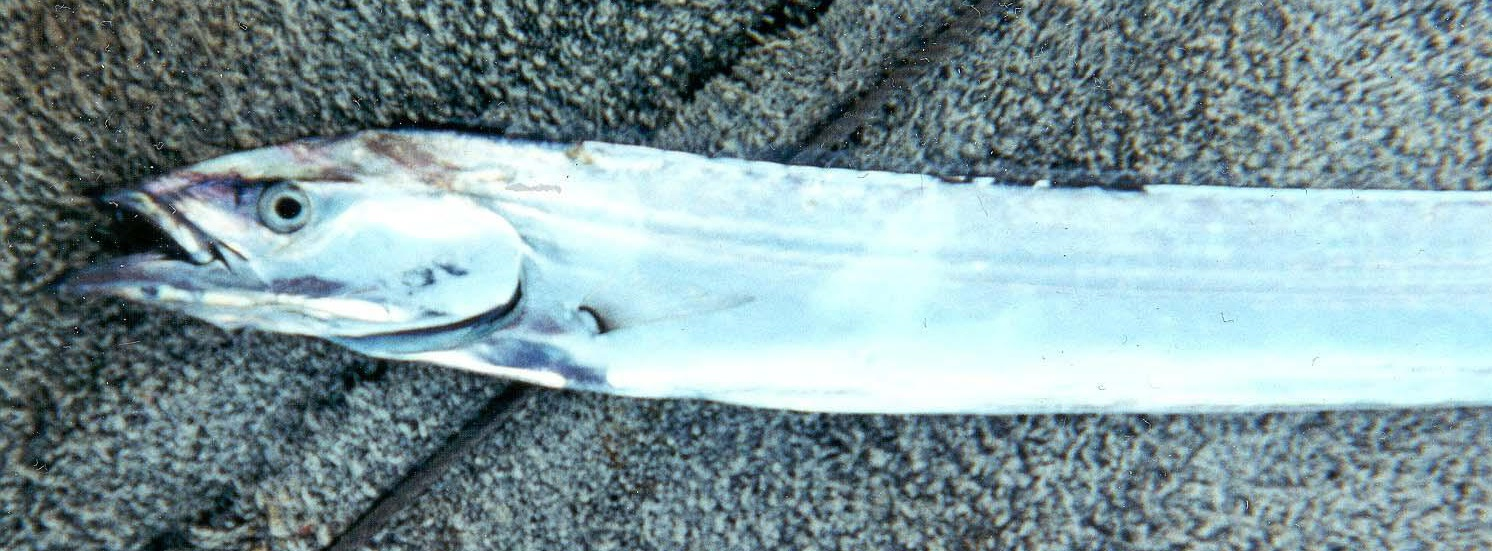
Close-up of the head of a razorback scabbardfish.

This fish has a very long and thin body, measuring 25 to 28 times as long as deep and 12 to 14 times as long as the head. The dorsal profile of the head is straight or slightly convex, with a prominent sagittal crest. The eye diameter is about one-eighth the head length. The lower jaw juts out past the upper, and both jaws are tipped with a short dermal process. There are three pairs of fangs at the front of the jaws. The dorsal fin is very long, containing a few weak spines at the front followed by 116-123 soft rays. The origin of the anal fin lies beneath the 42nd to 44th dorsal fin ray; the anal fin contains 74-87 elements but only 14-17 have external rays, led by 2 small spines. The pelvic fins are reduced to only 1 scale-like spine and 1 soft ray, placed beneath the 8th or 9th dorsal fin ray. A tiny forked caudal fin is present. The coloration is silver, with the front of the dorsal fin membrane black until the 3rd or 4th soft ray.

The razorback scabbardfish attains a maximum length of 2.5 meters (8.2 feet). Its diet consists of fishes, such as the Californian anchovy (Engraulis mordax) and the North Pacific hake (Merluccius productus), and squid. The only known parasite of the razorback scabbardfish is the copepod Avitocaligus assurgericola. Reproduction is presumably oviparous with pelagic eggs and larvae as with other members of the family, though eggs and newly hatched larvae have not been described. Flexion (the bending of the notochord as part of caudal fin formation) occurs at around a length of 14 mm (0.55 in). Post-flexion larvae have slender bodies and pointed heads, with the pelvic and first dorsal spines elongated. They can be distinguished by the presence of pigment on the top of the head, snout, and opercles. This species is not targeted by fisheries; it is sometimes hooked or netted, or found washed ashore.
