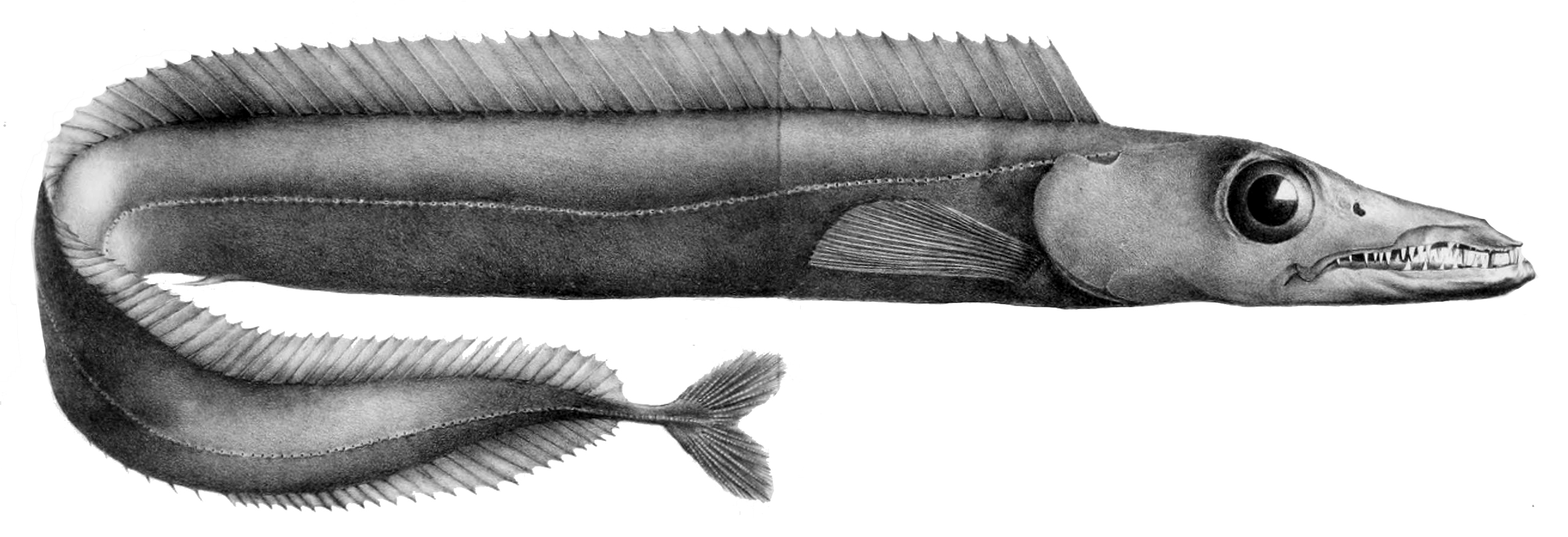

Conservation status
- Least Concern (IUCN 3.1)

Scientific classification
- Kingdom: Animalia
- Phylum: Chordata
- Class: Actinopterygii
- Order: Scombriformes
- Family: Trichiuridae
- Genus: Aphanopus
- Species: A. carbo

Binomial name
- Aphanopus carbo Lowe, 1839

Synonyms
- Aphanopus acus Aphanopus minor Aphanopus schmidti

= Black scabbardfish =

Species of fish

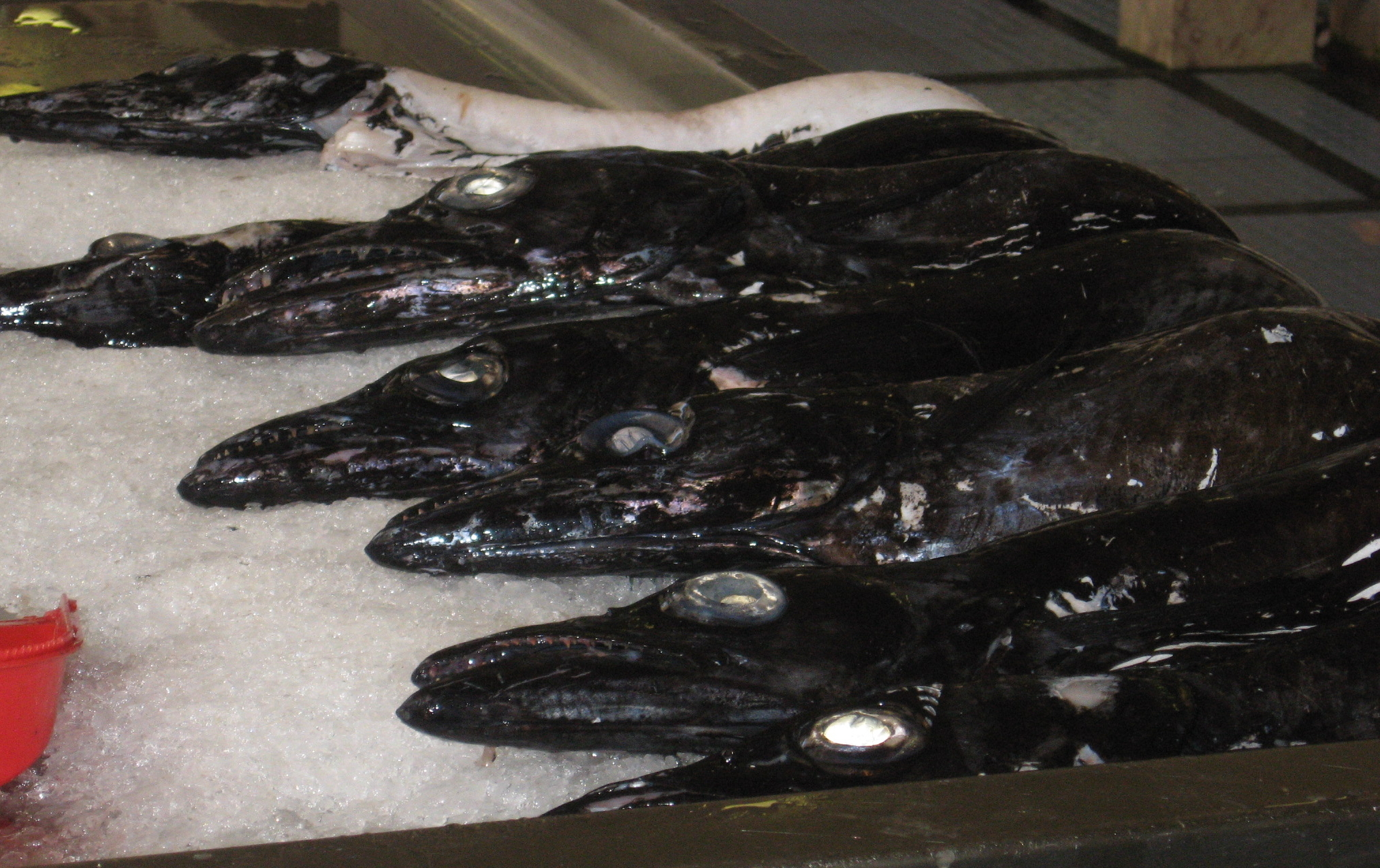
Black scabbardfish at Funchal market, Madeira

The black scabbardfish (Aphanopus carbo) is a bathypelagic cutlassfish of the family Trichiuridae found in the Atlantic Ocean between latitudes 69°N and 27°N at depths between 180 and 1,700 m (600 and 5,600 ft). Its length is up to 110 cm (3.6 ft), but it reaches maturity around 80 to 85 cm (2.6 to 2.8 ft).

== Description ==
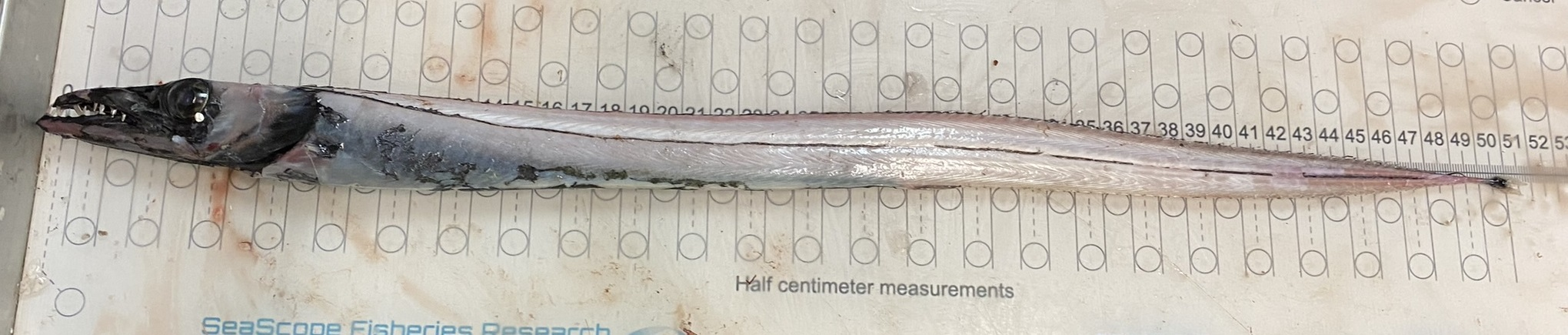
A specimen of Aphanopus carbo damaged during capture that has lost much of its characteristic black skin.

The black scabbardfish has an extremely elongated body; its body height is about one-eighth of the standard length, which is up to 1.1 m (3.6 ft). The snout is large with strong, fang-like teeth. The dorsal fin has 34 to 41 spines and 52 to 56 soft rays. The anal fin has two spines and 43 to 48 soft rays. The pelvic fin is represented by a single spine in juveniles, but is entirely absent in adults. The color is a coppery black with an iridescent tint. The inside of the mouth and gill cavities are black. Juveniles are believed to be mesopelagic, living at depths from 100 to 500 m (328 to 1,640 ft).

== Biology ==
The black scabbardfish is bathypelagic by day, but moves upwards in the water column at night to feed at middle depths on crustaceans, cephalopods, and other fishes, mostly grenadiers, codlings (family Moridae) and naked heads (family Alepocephalidae). The black scabbardfish coexists spatially with Aphanopus intermedius, which is a species commonly known as the intermediate scabbardfish. The narrow, elongated body of the black scabbardfish, along with its pointed head and long dorsal fin, is adapted for fast swimming. This fish has a large terminal mouth with large fang-like teeth for efficient predation. To camouflage well, it has a coppery-black coloration with an iridescent tint. The fish's large eyes, which have a diameter around 18% of the head length, are of such a large size to facilitate sight in low light. They become sexually mature at a length around 80 cm (31 in). Both the eggs and the larvae are pelagic, drifting with the plankton. In general, the size distribution moves towards higher values from north to south of the Northeast Atlantic. Eggs and larval stages of this fish are unknown and juvenile fish are rarely caught. Juveniles, however, are reported to be mesopelagic. The lifecycle of black scabbardfish is unknown, but the most common hypothesis is that one single stock undertakes a large-scale clockwise migration around the Northeast Atlantic. Spawning is restricted to certain areas, including Madeira, the Canary Islands, and possibly further south. The juvenile black scabbardfish stay to feed and grow for a few years in the fisheries south of the Faroe Islands and the west of the British Isles. Afterwards, the juveniles then move south towards mainland Portugal and even further south to the spawning areas. The most recent studies indicate that the maximum age of the black scabbardfish from Madeira was about 14 years and the maximum age in mainland Portugal was about 12 years. As opposed to most shelf demersal and pelagic commercial fish, the black scabbardfish exhibits a slow growth rate in adults, which results from energy investment in growth and reproduction.

== Reproduction ==
The black scabbardfish is an iteroparous species, meaning it can spawn multiple times throughout its life. It is also a total spawner, meaning that it releases all of its eggs in one single event per breeding season. It also exhibits determinate fecundity, meaning that all of the eggs are oocytes in the ovary before spawning. The females are expected to be able to spawn for a period of 8 years, but skip spawning may occur. If nonreproductive males are mixed with spawning adults, the females allocate their energy towards large-scale migration and growth and participate in skip spawning. The mature and spawning adult fish have only been observed in the last quarter of the year in certain locations including Madeira, the Canaries, and the northwest coast of Africa. The gonadosomatic index is higher for the same body length in the black scabbardfish located around Madeira as opposed to off mainland Portugal or to the west of the British Isles. This occurrence may be due to the areas lacking intrinsic and extrinsic factors that condition the maturity process in these areas. According to recent studies, developing females are dominant from April to August, and the reproduction period lasts from September to December with a prevalent number of prespawning and spawning females during this period. From December to March, most females have spawned. Developing males are seen throughout the year, though, mainly from March to August. Prespawning males are more abundant from July to November. Similar to the females, postspawning males are prevalent from December to April. Generally, developing females are prevalent in Madeiran waters around spring and their reproductive cycles continue in this area, whereas mainland Portugal females begin to suffer from a generalized atresia from July on.

== Diet ==
Black scabbardfish have 35 or more prey categories, including crustaceans, cephalopods, mesopelagic fish, shrimp, teleost fish, and blue whiting. Blue whiting may be a preferred prey; other mesopelagic fish are also preferred. When black scabbardfish are not feeding on these, they may chase after baitfish, feeding on Sardina pilchardus, Scomber colias, or squid.

== Parasitic infection ==
The black scabbardfish is a suitable host for the parasite Anisakis, mainly due to the fishes' diet of infected hosts such as crustaceans (euphausiids, copepods, and amphipods), fish, and cephalopods. This parasite is a nematode capable of entering the hosts' stomach wall or intestines. Scientists have used these parasites to track where the black scabbardfish has traveled. These parasites are commonly used for tracking, since they are prevalent in waters near Portugal and the Madeira Islands. A study has been conducted on the infectivity of the Anisakis app. Larvae (Nematoda: Aniskidae) in the black scabbardfish near Portuguese waters. The three regions that were observed in the study were the mainland coast of Portugal, Madeira, and the Azores. The mainland and Madeira regions were observed throughout four seasons by scientists and the Azores were observed in two seasons. In all fish observed, all were infected by L3 larvae. Consumption of raw or undercooked black scabbard fish can result in health complications for humans. The only reliable treatment for a human affected with anisakiasis is the removal of the nematodes through endoscopy, or surgery.

== Migration and habitat ==
The black scabbardfish can be found throughout the Northeast Atlantic in differing stages of growth through its life. This fish performs a clockwise migration during its lifecycle driven by reproduction and feeding habits. The black scabbardfish spawns near the Madeira Islands and the Canary Archipelago during October through December. They then are thought to head north to cooler waters, where they feed and grow. Upon reaching adulthood, they then move south again to the waters off Portugal until they are of reproductive maturity age and return to their spawning grounds. Some debate exists on the spawning areas of the black scabbardfish. Though the Madeira spawning area is well known, some other spawning areas off the northwestern coast of Africa may be used, as mature females have been found in this region during the reproductive time.

== Economic value ==
The black scabbardfish is of economic importance to fisheries associated with countries of the Iberian Peninsula, and especially the Madeira Islands, where they are prized for food. The species is also fished around Iceland, France, Ireland, and some areas of the Canary Islands. Because of its good flesh quality, it usually fetches high prices. The black scabbardfish, along with the crab, are the two most sought-after sea products for consumption in the Madeira Islands and Portugal, so play a significant economic role in these locations. In areas in Portuguese waters, the black scabbardfish has traditionally been caught by line gear. In the Atlantic around France and Ireland, the fish are caught by trawlers. The black scabbardfish, has high economic value in areas such as Portugal, it is the most important deep-water fish exploited, and landings increased from 2700 tonnes per year between 1988 and 1993 and around 2000 and increased to 2900 tonnes in landings in 2007. In the last decade alone, landings have increased to about 6000 tonnes, 3000 tonnes in Madeira and 3000 tonnes in mainland Portugal.

== Consumption and health ==
Despite having huge market value and a strong hold in the typical Southern European diet, several health risks are associated with consumption of the black scabbardfish due to the presence of several toxic metals found within the fish, including lead, mercury, and cadmium. Even in very small quantities, these metals can be deadly to humans if consumed. However, according to standards set by the World Health Organization and the Food and Agricultural Organization, as long as the liver is not consumed, no real health risks exist in consuming the black scabbardfish in moderation. The levels of toxic metals found in the fish were: Liver: between 2.37 mg/kg and 4.5 mg/kg of mercury found Skin: between 0.36 mg/kg and 0.59 mg/kg of mercury found 0.11 mg/kg of cadmium found Muscle: 0.9 mg/kg mercury found, 0.09 mg/kg maximum cadmium levels found In every sample, the lead found was less than 0.10 mg/kg. Black scabbardfish are known hosts to Anisakis. Eating raw or undercooked black scabbardfish could result in a parasitic infection known as anisakiasis, and the only way this condition can be treated is by removal of the nematodes through endoscopy, or surgery.

== Conservation ==
Black scabbardfish are deep-sea creatures, existing in abundance between 800 and 1,300 m (2,620 and 4,270 ft) deep. They are mainly caught in mixed trawl fisheries along with other deep-water species, and are highly vulnerable to overfishing. The Marine Conservation Society ranks this species as a number five out of five on the sustainability chart. This means that the species is vital to their ecosystem. Preservation of this species is highly recommended. However, this species is of high commercial importance, with annual catches reaching up to 14,000 tonnes. The high abundance of this species is declining in some areas of the Northeast Atlantic.
