= Tirante =

Tirante may refer to:

- Tirante (fish)
- USS Tirante, a Tench-class submarine of the United States Navy
- Tirante el Blanco, the Spanish name of Tirant lo Blanch, a 15th century Valencian chivalric romance
  - Tirante el Blanco (film), the Spanish name of the 2006 film Tirant lo Blanc
- Florentino Tirante (born 1961), Filipino wrestler
- Thiago Agustín Tirante (born 2001), Argentinian tennis player

== See also ==
- Tirantes Bridge, Pontevedra, Spain
