= Bigeye squaretail =

Conservation status
- Least Concern (IUCN 3.1)

Scientific classification
- Kingdom: Animalia
- Phylum: Chordata
- Class: Actinopterygii
- Order: Scombriformes
- Family: Tetragonuridae
- Genus: Tetragonurus
- Species: T. atlanticus

Binomial name
- Tetragonurus atlanticus Lowe, 1839

Synonyms
- Ctenodax wilkinsoni MacLeay, 1886

Species of ray-finned fish

The bigeye squaretail, Tetragonurus atlanticus, is a fish native to the Atlantic, Indian and Pacific Oceans. They feed on soft-bodied medusae and salps and will also eat plankton. Their average length is 50 cm, and their habitat is pelagic. They are toxic to humans.
