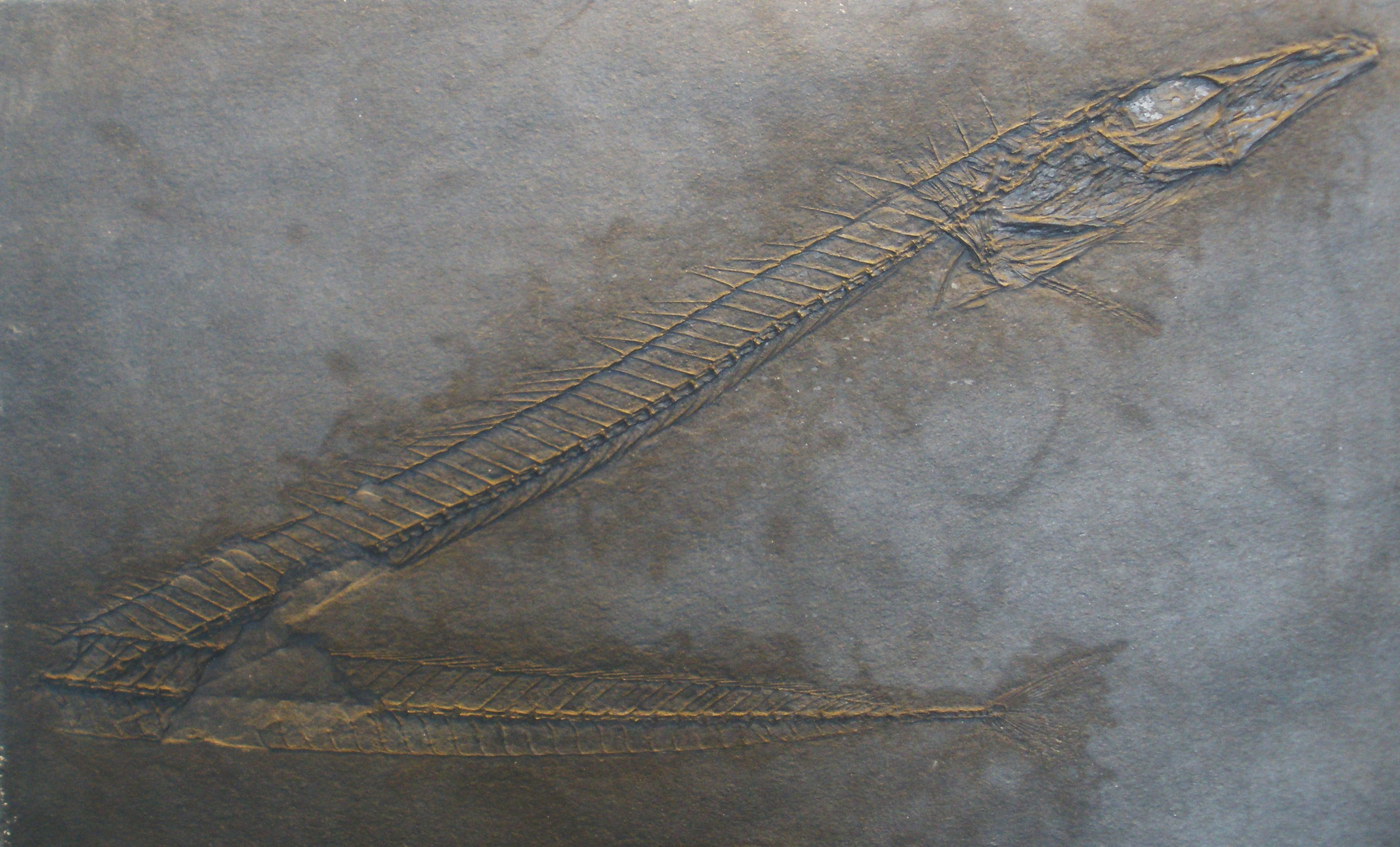
- Specimen of A. glarisianum from Switzerland

Scientific classification
- Kingdom: Animalia
- Phylum: Chordata
- Class: Actinopterygii
- Division: Teleostei
- Order: Scombriformes
- Family: Trichiuridae
- Subfamily: Aphanopodinae
- Genus: †Anenchelum de Blainville, 1818

Type species
- †Anenchelum glarisianum de Blainville, 1818

Species
- See text

= Anenchelum =

Anenchelum Temporal range: Middle Eocene to Late Miocene

Extinct genus of fishes

Anenchelum (Greek for "not an eel") is an extinct genus of cutlassfish known from the middle Eocene to the late Miocene. Several species are known that inhabited the northwestern Tethys and later Paratethys region, centered around east-central Europe and west Asia. This genus was synonymized with the extant Lepidopus for a time before being revived as a distinct genus in 1995.

== Taxonomy ==
The following species are known:

- †A. angustum Daniltshenko, 1980 - Early Oligocene of Adygea, Russia (Khadum Formation), potentially Baden-Württemberg, Germany (Raunberg Lagerstätte)
- †A. eocaenicum Daniltshenko, 1962 - Middle Eocene (Lutetian) of Georgia (Dabakhan Formation)
- †A. glarisianum de Blainville, 1818 (type species) - Early Oligocene of Canton Glarus, Switzerland (Matt Formation), the Czech Republic (Menilitic Formation) & Romania, and the early to late Miocene of Crete, Greece and the Czech Republic
- †A. lednevi Menner, 1949 - Early Miocene of Azerbaijan
- †A. paucivertebrale Bannikov & Parin, 1995 - Middle Eocene (Bartonian) of Krasnodar, Russia (Kuma Formation)

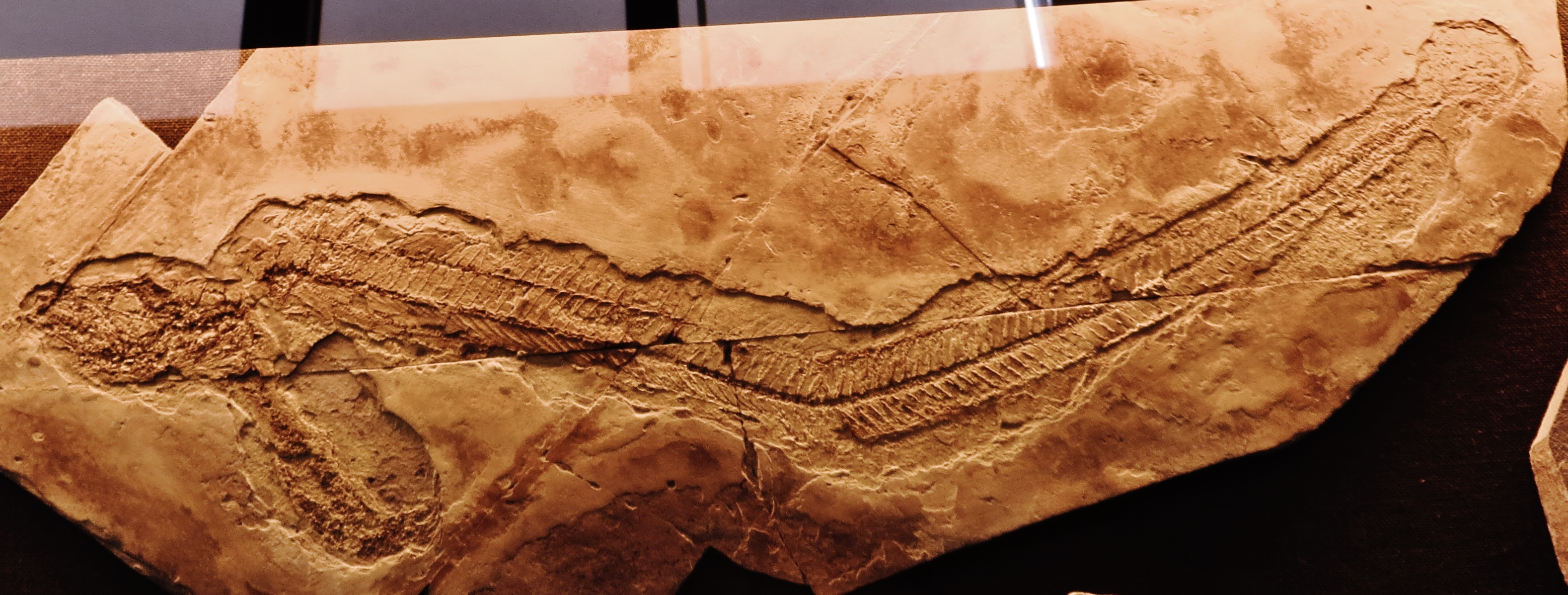
Specimen of A. glarisianum from Romania

The species Lepidopus brevicauda from Switzerland and Lepidopus hungaricus from Hungary may also be classified into this genus, but further research is necessary. Indeterminate remains of Anenchelum are known from the Early Oligocene of Poland. The alleged earliest records of Anenchelum from the Early Eocene of Italy are now known to comprise their own distinct genus, Exeomastix.

== Ecology ==
Anenchelum was a predatory fish that likely fed on other fish, like its modern relatives. A specimen of A. glarisianum from the Czech Republic contained fossil remains of extinct hake Merluccius latus in its stomach cavity, and fish remains were also recorded in the stomach cavity of an individual from Switzerland. Uniquely, a fossilized individual of A. glarisianum from the Menilitic Formation of the Czech Republic shows evidence of cannibalism, potentially due to an ecological imbalance in the habitat at the time. Anenchelum itself fell prey to other animals in its ecosystem; a small individual of A. angustum from Russia is preserved next to the fossilized imprint of a Loligo squid, which appears to have attempted to prey on it before both were fossilized; this specimen is notable for being the first squid body fossil known.
