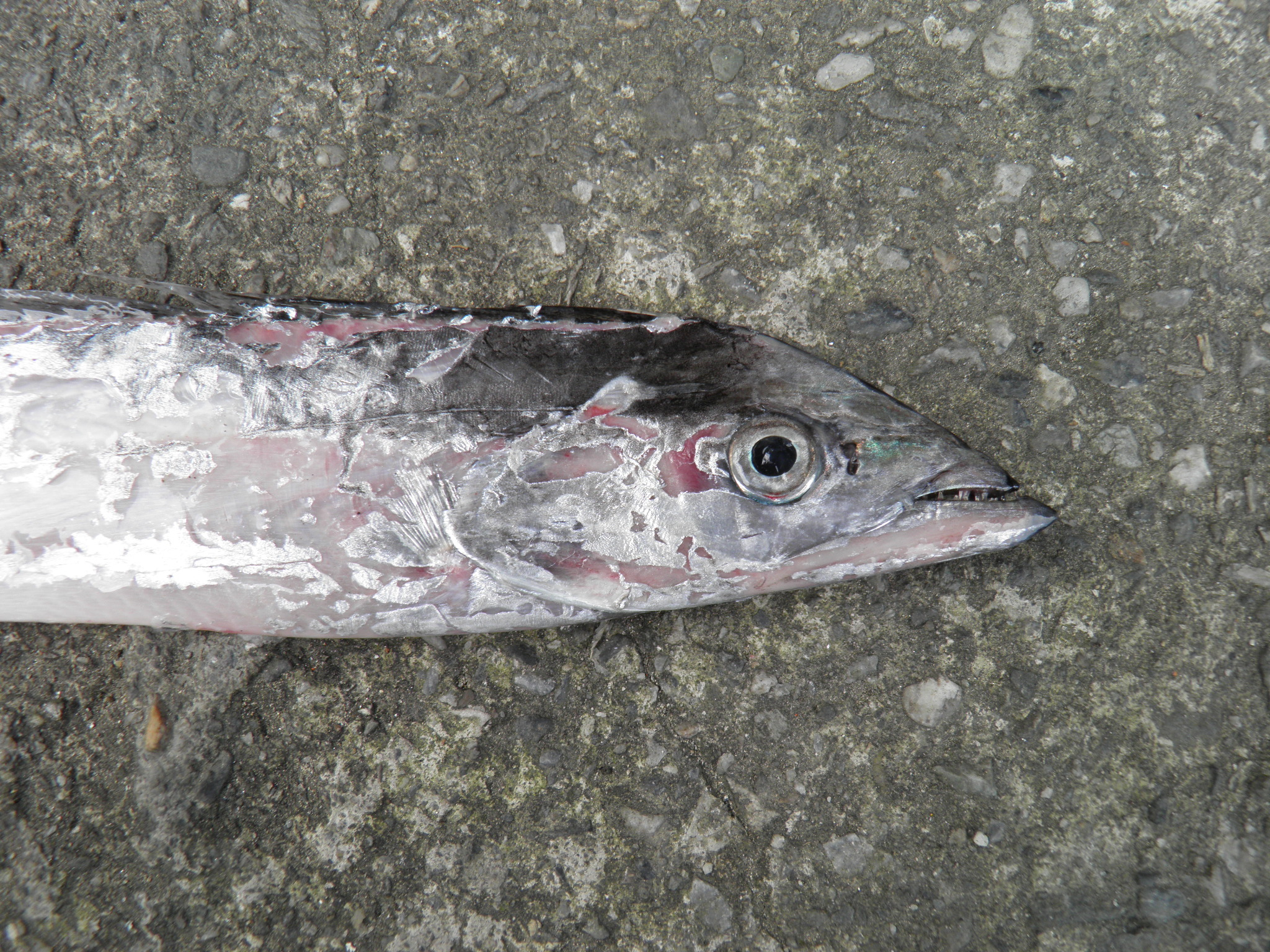
- Head with the "crest"

Scientific classification
- Kingdom: Animalia
- Phylum: Chordata
- Class: Actinopterygii
- Order: Scombriformes
- Family: Trichiuridae
- Subfamily: Trichiurinae
- Genus: Tentoriceps; Whitley, 1948
- Species: T. cristatus

Binomial name
- Tentoriceps cristatus (Klunzinger, 1884)

Synonyms
- Trichiurus cristatus Klunzinger, 1884; Pseudoxymetopon sinensis Chu & Wu, 1962

= Tentoriceps =

Genus of fishes

Tentoriceps is a monotypic genus of cutlassfish, family Trichiuridae, from the Indian and Pacific Oceans. The sole species is Tentoriceps cristatus. Its common name is crested hairtail.

== Distribution ==
Tentoriceps cristatus has Indo-West Pacific distribution: it is found in the Indian Ocean (including the Red Sea) and in the Western Pacific Ocean, between the Tasman Sea and southern Japan. It is a benthopelagic to pelagic species that occurs in coastal waters 30–110 m (98–361 ft) deep, but avoids areas of low salinity.

== Description ==
Typical for cutlassfishes, Tentoriceps cristatus has extremely elongate and strongly compressed, ribbon-like body, tapering to a point. The dorsal profile of head is evenly convex. It grows to a maximum length of about 90 cm (35 in) TL, but common length is 30–70 cm (12–28 in) TL.

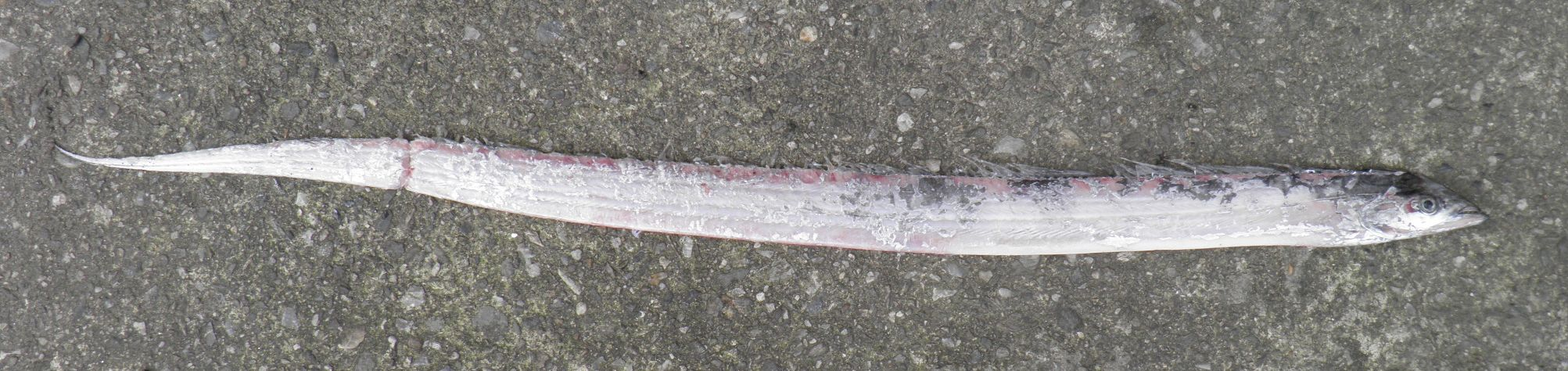
Tentoriceps cristatus landed in Dongao, Yilan County, Taiwan

== Fisheries ==
Tentoriceps cristatus is a minor commercial species caught mainly mixed with other cutlassfish in southeast Asian countries.
