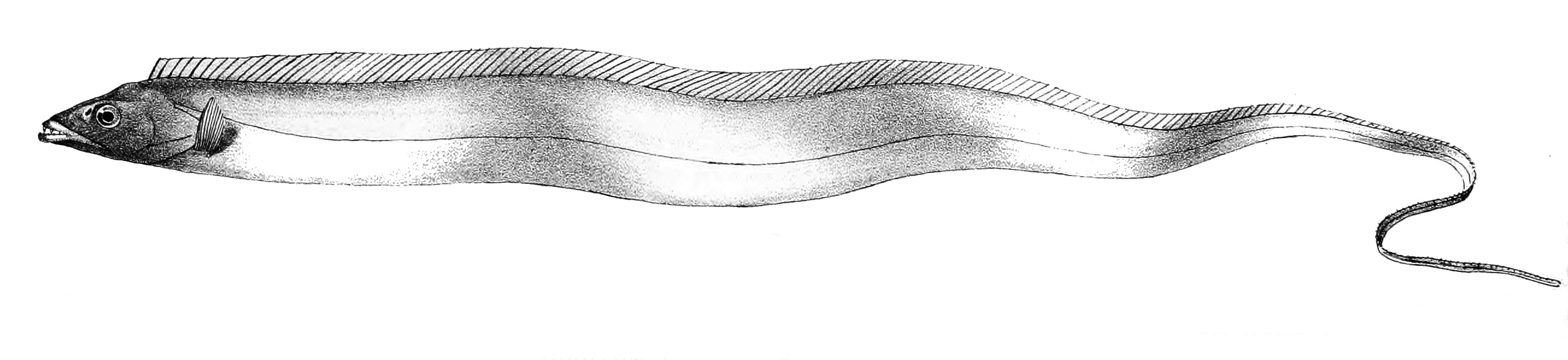
- Eupleurogrammus muticus

Scientific classification
- Kingdom: Animalia
- Phylum: Chordata
- Class: Actinopterygii
- Order: Scombriformes
- Family: Trichiuridae
- Subfamily: Lepidopodinae
- Genus: Eupleurogrammus; Gill, 1862

Type species
- Trichiurus muticus Gray, 1831

= Eupleurogrammus =

Genus of ray-finned fishes

Eupleurogrammus is a genus of cutlassfish from the Indo-Pacific region. They are benthopelagic fishes which occur mainly over the continental shelf where they move upwards in the water column towards the surface at night and feed on small fishes, squid and crustaceans. They have very elongated and highly compressed bodies which tapers towards a posterior point.

== Species ==
There are two species in the genus Eupleorogrammus:

- Eupleurogrammus glossodon, (Bleeker, 1860) (Longtooth hairtail)
- Eupleurogrammus muticus, (Gray, 1831) (Smallhead hairtail)
