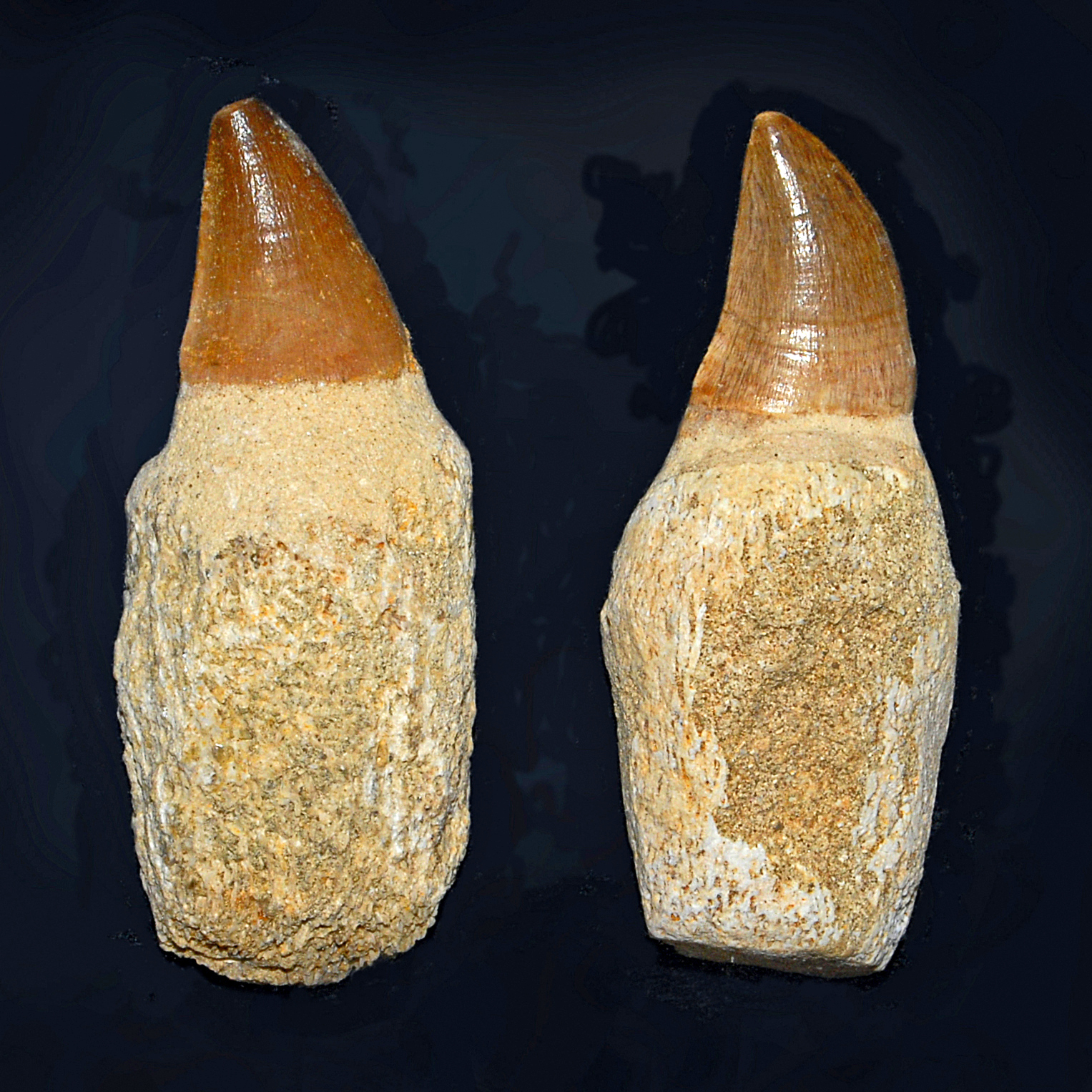
- Fossil teeth of E. goberti from Khouribga (Morocco)

Scientific classification
- Kingdom: Animalia
- Phylum: Chordata
- Class: Actinopterygii
- Division: Teleostei
- Order: Scombriformes
- Family: Trichiuridae
- Genus: †Eutrichiurides; Casier, 1944

Type species
- †Trichiurides delheidi Leriche, 1908

Species
- See text

= Eutrichiurides =

Eutrichiurides Temporal range: Early Paleocene to Early Oligocene

Extinct genus of fishes

Eutrichiurides ("true Trichiurus resemblance") is an extinct genus of cutlassfish known from the early Paleocene to the early Oligocene.

== Taxonomy ==
Species within this genus include:

- †E. africanus Dartevelle & Casier, 1949 - mid-late Paleocene (Selandian to Thanetian) of Angola (Landana Formation)
- †E. delheidi (Leriche, 1908) (type species)- Early Oligocene of Belgium (Boom Clay) (=Trichiurides delheidi Leriche, 1908)
- †E. orpiensis (Leriche, 1906) - Early Paleocene of Morocco & North Dakota, USA (Cannonball Formation), Late Paleocene of Belgium, Early Eocene of England
- †E. plicidens (Arambourg, 1952) - middle Eocene (early Lutetian to middle Bartonian) of Alabama, USA (Tallahatta, Lisbon and Gosport Sand Formations), potentially Bartonian of Libya
- †E. goberti Casier, 1944 - Early Eocene of Tunisia (Gafsa-Metlaoui Basin)
- †E. termieri (Arambourg, 1952) - Late Paleocene/Early Eocene of Morocco (Ouled Abdoun Basin)

E. delheidi is the only member of this genus known from partial skull elements (including a partial jawbone) instead of only isolated teeth. The former species E. winkleri Casier, 1946 from the London Clay has been moved to its own genus, Macroynis, as an indeterminate trichiuroid, as there is no evidence that it is a member of this genus.

Fossil teeth of an indeterminate Eutrichiurides have been recovered from the high-latitude Eureka Sound Formation of Nunavut, Canada, suggesting that this genus ranged as far north as the Arctic Circle during the Early Eocene Climatic Optimum. Indeterminate teeth are also known from the middle Eocene-aged Shark River Formation of New Jersey, the Early Eocene-aged Khuiala Formation & Cambay Shale of Gujarat & Rajasthan, India, the late Eocene-aged Fayum Depression of Egypt, and the Early Oligocene of the Paris Basin of France.

== Description ==
Eutrichiurides species were very similar in form and build to modern cutlassfish, in that they were long and slender, blade-shaped fishes with elongated jaws possessing fangs and needle-shaped teeth.

== See also ==
- Prehistoric fish
- List of prehistoric bony fish
