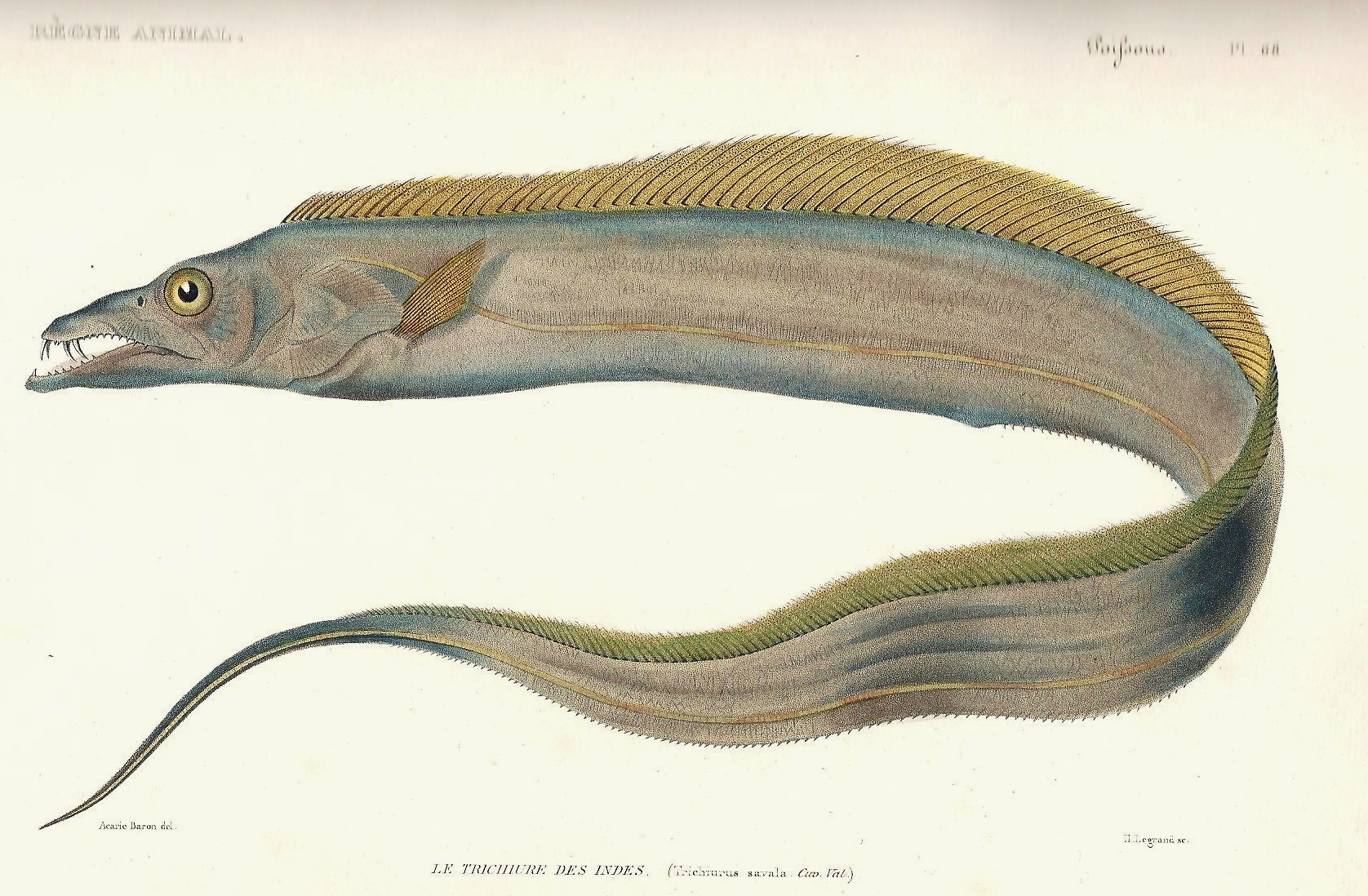
- Lepturacanthus savala

Scientific classification
- Kingdom: Animalia
- Phylum: Chordata
- Class: Actinopterygii
- Order: Scombriformes
- Family: Trichiuridae
- Subfamily: Trichiurinae
- Genus: Lepturacanthus; Fowler, 1905

Type species
- Trichiurus savala Cuvier, 1829

= Lepturacanthus =

Genus of ray-finned fishes

Lepturacanthus is a genus of cutlassfish from the Indo-Pacific region. They are benthopelagic species of waters over the continental shelf, it is a predator of a variety of small coastal fishes, squid and crustaceans.

== Species ==
The following species comprise the genus Lepturacanthus:

- Lepturacanthus pantului, (Gupta, 1966) (Coromandel hairtail)
- Lepturacanthus roelandti (Bleeker, 1860)
- Lepturacanthus savala, (Cuvier, 1829) (Savalani hairtail)
