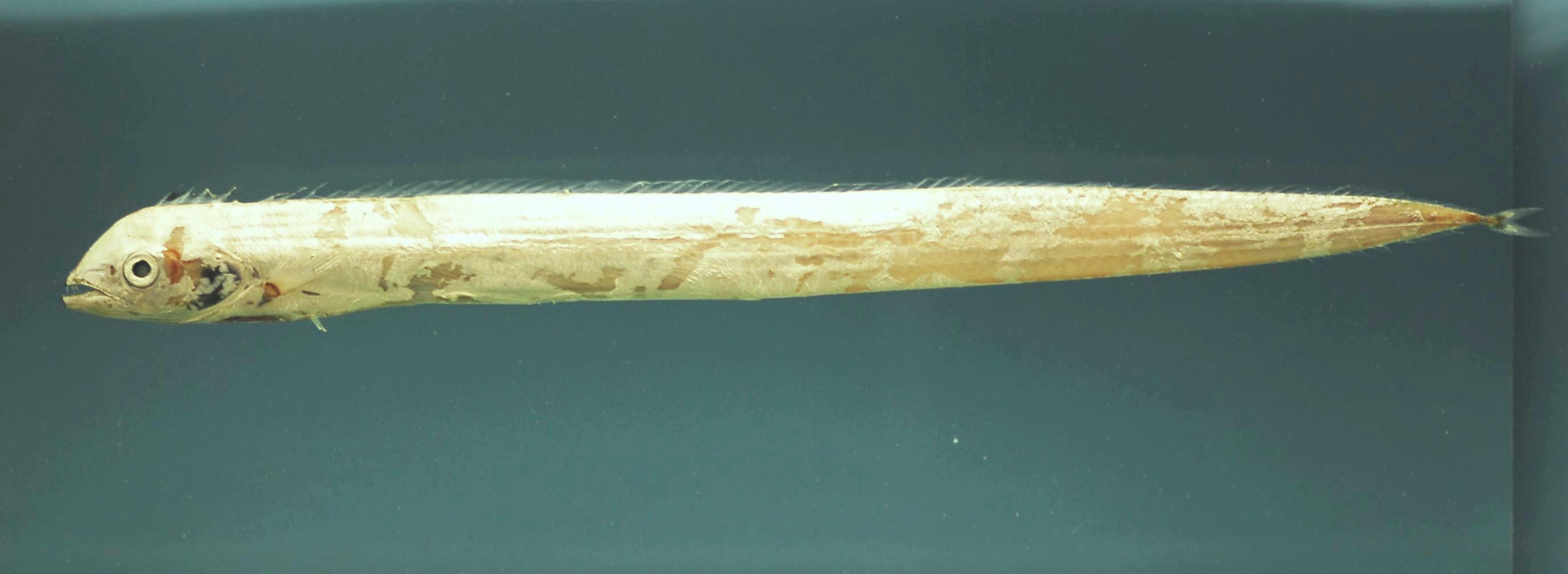

Scientific classification
- Kingdom: Animalia
- Phylum: Chordata
- Class: Actinopterygii
- Order: Scombriformes
- Family: Trichiuridae
- Genus: Evoxymetopon
- Species: E. taeniatus

Binomial name
- Evoxymetopon taeniatus Gill, 1863

= Evoxymetopon taeniatus =

Evoxymetopon taeniatus, commonly known as channel scabbardfish and tyrant fish, is a silvery, elongated species of cutlass fish found in waters off Cuba.
