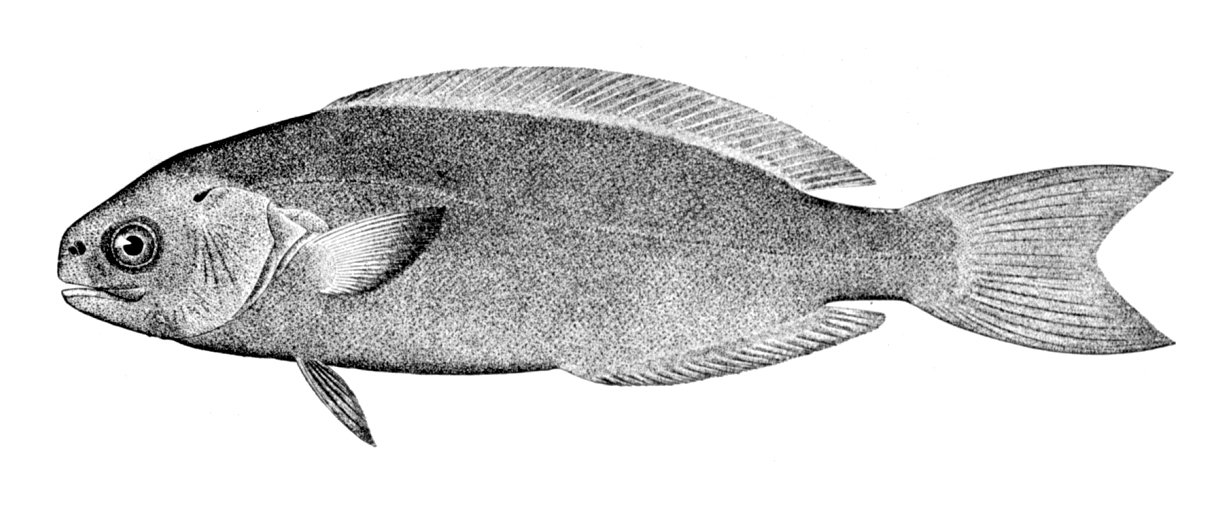
- Rudderfish Centrolophus niger

Scientific classification
- Kingdom: Animalia
- Phylum: Chordata
- Class: Actinopterygii
- Order: Scombriformes
- Suborder: Stromateoidei

Families
- Amarsipidae; Ariommatidae; Centrolophidae (medusafishes); Nomeidae (driftfishes); Tetragonuridae (squaretails); Stromateidae (butterfishes); †Propercarinidae

= Stromateoidei =

Stromateoidei Temporal range: Middle Paleocene–present

Suborder of fishes

Stromateoidei or Stromateales is a suborder or infraorder of marine ray-finned fish within the order Scombriformes or suborder Scombroidei. It includes the medusafishes, squaretails and driftfishes which associate with jellyfish, the latter families preying on them while the medusafish use them for protection while scavenging food scraps. It also contains the true butterfish, a common food fish.

== Taxonomy ==
In earlier classifications, it has sometimes been treated as its own order, Stromateiformes, and some studies still treat it as such. However, Eschmeyer's Catalog of Fishes considers it one of two major suborders or infraorders of Scombriformes or Scombroidei.

The following classification is used by Eschmeyer's Catalog of Fishes (2025):

- Suborder Stromateoidei
  - Family Amarsipidae Haedrich, 1969 (bagless glassfishes or amarsipas)
  - Family Centrolophidae Bonaparte, 1846 (medusafishes)
  - Family Nomeidae Günther, 1860 (driftfishes)
  - Family Tetragonuridae Risso, 1827 (squaretails)
  - Family Ariommatidae Haedrich, 1967 (ariommas or ariommatids)
  - Family Stromateidae Rafinesque, 1810 (butterfishes)

Some authors consider this treatment paraphyletic with respect to Scombroidei.

=== Fossil taxa ===
The following fossil taxa are also known:

- Suborder Stromateoidei
  - Family †Propercarinidae Bannikov, 1995 (containing only Propercarina from the Oligocene of Europe)
  - Genus †Butyrumichthys Schrøder, Rasmussen, Møller & Carnevale, 2022 (tentatively treated as a medusafish)
  - Genus †Cubariomma Bannikov, 2018 (shows traits of both ariommatids and nomeids)
  - Genus †Uylyakushlyukia Bannikov, 2026

The enigmatic percomorph †Salwaichthys Bannikov, 2020 from the Oligocene of Europe also resembles the stromateoids in certain aspects, but remains taxonomically indeterminate.

The earliest fossil remains of stromateoids are otoliths tentatively referred to the Centrolophidae, species "Mupus" sinuosus from the middle Paleocene of Denmark. The oldest known stromateoid body fossil is Butyrumichthys from the earliest Eocene of Denmark.
