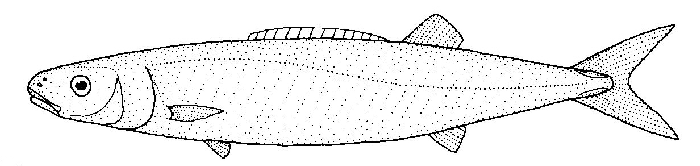
- Smalleye squaretail, Tetragonurus cuvieri Drawing by Dr Tony Ayling

Scientific classification
- Domain: Eukaryota
- Kingdom: Animalia
- Phylum: Chordata
- Class: Actinopterygii
- Order: Scombriformes
- Suborder: Stromateoidei
- Family: Tetragonuridae
- Genus: Tetragonurus; Risso, 1810

Type species
- Tetragonurus cuvieri Risso, 1810

Species
- See text.

Synonyms
- Ctenodax Macleay, 1886

= Squaretail =

Squaretails

Genus of ray-finned fishes

The squaretails are a genus, Tetragonurus, of scombriform ray-finned fishes, the only genus in the family Tetragonuridae.

They are found in tropical and subtropical oceans, and feed on jellyfish and ctenophores.

== Species ==
The three species are:

- Bigeye squaretail, T. atlanticus Lowe, 1839
- Smalleye squaretail, T. cuvieri Risso, 1810
- Pacific squaretail, T. pacificus Abe, 1953

Synonyms

- Tetragonurus simplex Lowe, 1834 accepted as Ruvettus pretiosus Cocco, 1833
