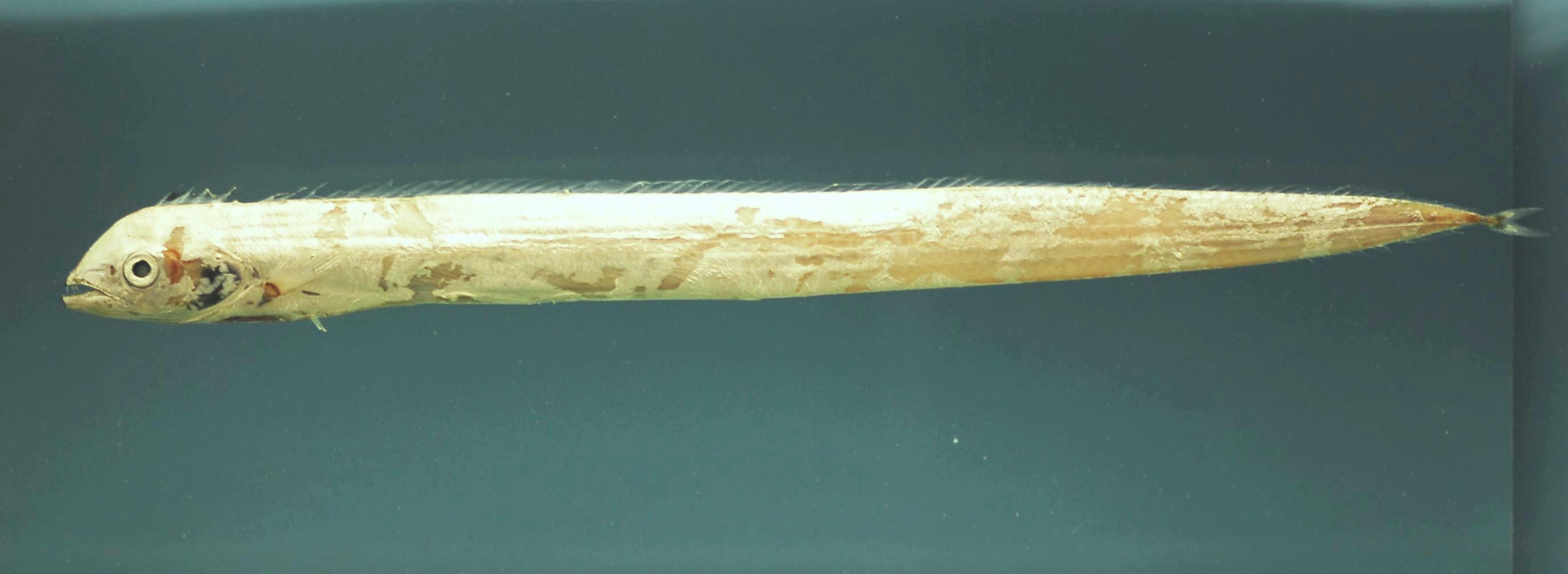
- Evoxymetopon taeniatus

Scientific classification
- Domain: Eukaryota
- Kingdom: Animalia
- Phylum: Chordata
- Class: Actinopterygii
- Order: Scombriformes
- Family: Trichiuridae
- Subfamily: Lepidopodinae
- Genus: Evoxymetopon; T. N. Gill, 1863

Type species
- Evoxymetopon taeniatus Gill 1863

= Evoxymetopon =

Genus of fishes

Evoxymetopon is a genus of cutlassfish found in all oceans. It is one of nine genera in the family Trichiuridae.

== Species ==
There are currently four recognized species in this genus:

- Evoxymetopon macrophthalmus Chakraborty, Yoshino & Iwatsuki, 2006 (Bigeye scabbardfish)
- Evoxymetopon moricheni Fricke, Golani & Appelbaum-Golani, 2014
- Evoxymetopon poeyi Günther, 1887 (Poey's scabbardfish)
- Evoxymetopon taeniatus T. N. Gill, 1863 (Channel scabbardfish)
