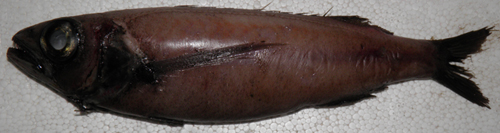

Conservation status
- Least Concern (IUCN 3.1)

Scientific classification
- Kingdom: Animalia
- Phylum: Chordata
- Class: Actinopterygii
- Order: Scombriformes
- Suborder: Scombroidei
- Family: Scombrolabracidae; Fowler, 1925
- Genus: Scombrolabrax; Roule, 1921
- Species: S. heterolepis

Binomial name
- Scombrolabrax heterolepis Roule, 1921

= Longfin escolar =

Species of ray-finned fish

The longfin escolar, Scombrolabrax heterolepis, also known as the black mackerel, is a widespread but uncommon deep sea ray-finned fish that presents some difficulties for taxonomy.

It is placed in its own family Scombrolabracidae, but the family's placement in the suborders of Perciformes has included Scombroidei, Percoidei, and Trichiuroidei, while some authors place it in its own suborder Scombrolabracoidei and even in its own order the Scombrolabraciformes.

The fish bears some resemblance to members of Gempylidae, but has protrusible premaxillae, serrated opercles and preopercles, and a spur on the lowest principal caudal ray, all of which are characteristic of percoids. Its color varies from black to dark brown. This fish is known to grow to 30 cm in length. The body is covered in soft scales which easily slough off when handled. The eyes are large with usually a single pair of elongated teeth in the middle of the top jaw.

The longfin escolar is unique among fishes for having several of its vertebrae hollowed out and filled by evaginations of the gas bladder. It is most often encountered as a bycatch species in pelagic longline fisheries.
