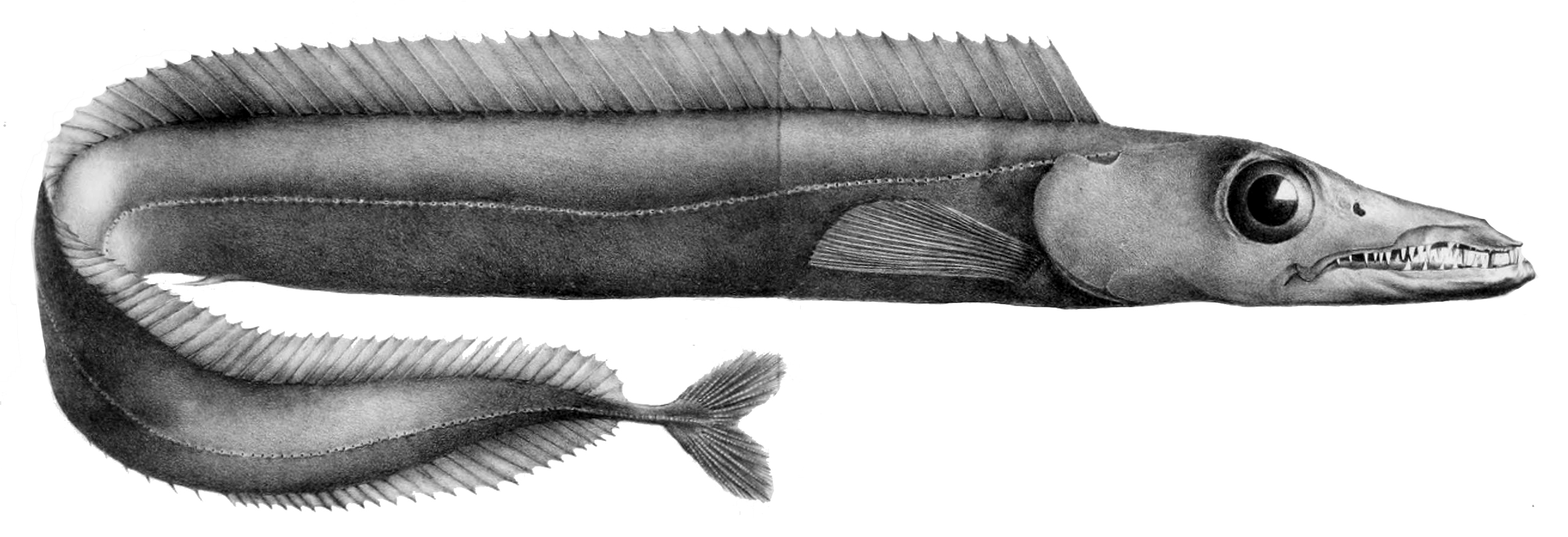
- Aphanopus carbo

Scientific classification
- Kingdom: Animalia
- Phylum: Chordata
- Class: Actinopterygii
- Order: Scombriformes
- Family: Trichiuridae
- Subfamily: Aphanopodinae
- Genus: Aphanopus; Lowe, 1839

Type species
- Aphanopus carbo Lowe, 1839

Species
- See text

= Aphanopus =

Genus of fishes

Aphanopus, the black scabbardfishes, is a genus of Cutlassfish which contains the following species:

- Aphanopus arigato Parin, 1994
- Aphanopus beckeri Parin, 1994
- Aphanopus capricornis Parin, 1994
- Aphanopus carbo Lowe, 1839 (Black scabbardfish)
- Aphanopus intermedius Parin, 1983 (Intermediate scabbardfish)
- Aphanopus microphthalmus Norman, 1939 (Smalleye scabbardfish)
- Aphanopus mikhailini Parin, 1983 (Mikhailin's scabbardfish)

== General references ==
- "Aphanopus carbo". Integrated Taxonomic Information System.
- Froese, Rainer; Pauly, Daniel (eds.). "Aphanopus carbo". FishBase. December 2007 version.
