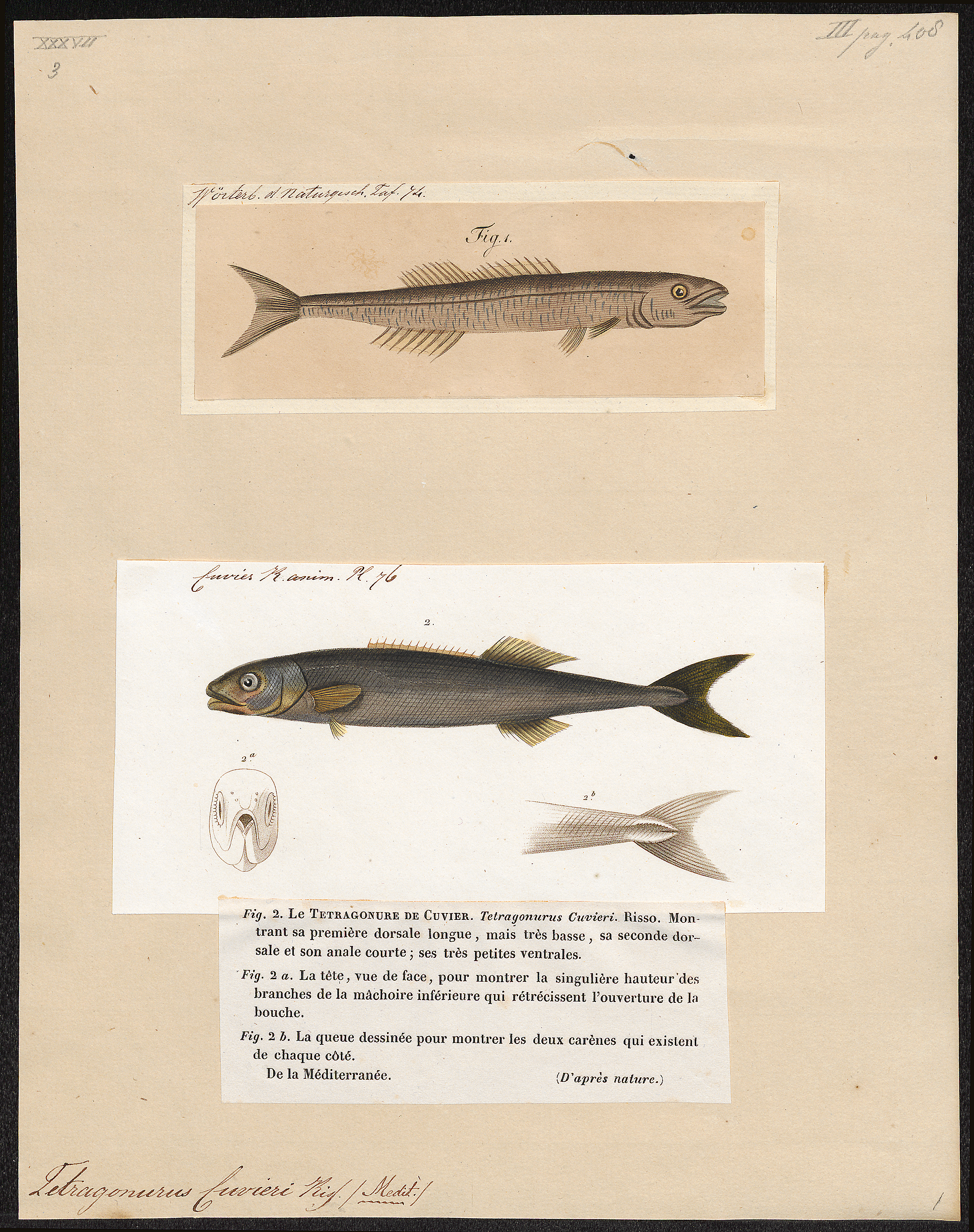
- Tetragonurus cuvieri - 1700-1880 - Print - Iconographia Zoologica - Special Collections University of Amsterdam

Conservation status
- Least Concern (IUCN 3.1)

Scientific classification
- Kingdom: Animalia
- Phylum: Chordata
- Class: Actinopterygii
- Division: Teleostei
- Order: Scombriformes
- Family: Tetragonuridae
- Genus: Tetragonurus
- Species: T. cuvieri

Binomial name
- Tetragonurus cuvieri Risso, 1810

= Smalleye squaretail =

Species of ray-finned fish

The smalleye squaretail, Tetragonurus cuvieri, is a squaretail of the genus Tetragonurus found in all tropical and temperate oceans of the world, at depths up to 800 m. Its length is 20 to 70 cm.
