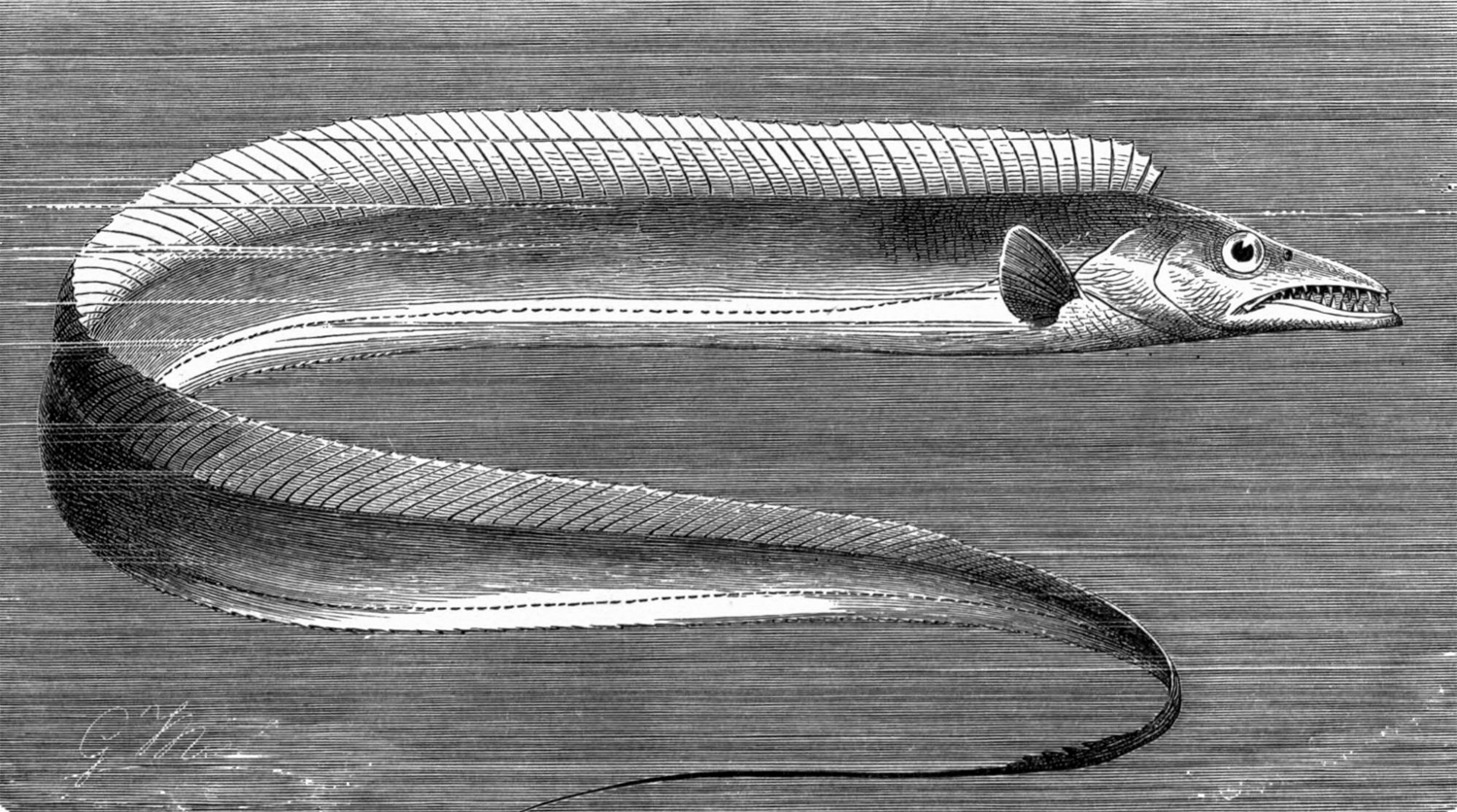
- Drawing of Lepidopus caudatus

Scientific classification
- Kingdom: Animalia
- Phylum: Chordata
- Class: Actinopterygii
- Division: Teleostei
- Order: Scombriformes
- Family: Trichiuridae
- Subfamily: Lepidopodinae
- Genus: Lepidopus; Goüan, 1770

Type species
- Lepidopus gouanianus Lacépède, 1800

Synonyms
- Scarcina Rafinesque, 1810; Vandellius Shaw, 1803; Ziphotheca Montagu, 1811

= Lepidopus =

Lepidopus Temporal range: Oligocene - Quaternary

Genus of ray-finned fishes

Lepidopus is a genus of cutlassfishes.

== Fossil record ==
These fishes lived from the Oligocene to Quaternary (from 33.9 to 1.806 million years ago). Fossils have been found in Italy, Cyprus, Greece, Azerbaijan, the Czech Republic, Germany and Hungary.

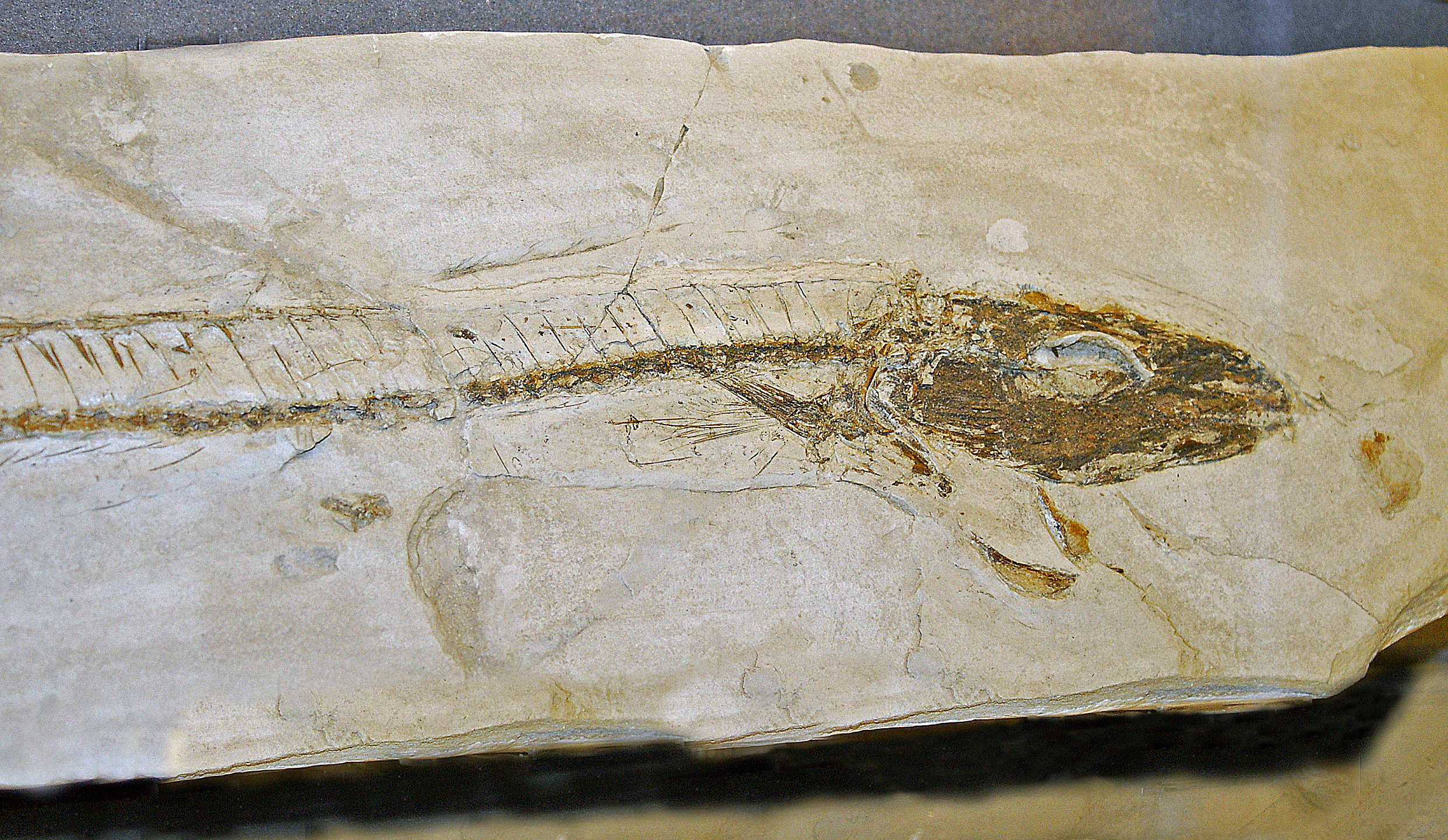
Fossil of Lepidopus proargenteus

== Species ==
Species within this genus include:

- Lepidopus altifrons, Parin & Collette, 1993 (Crested scabbardfish)
- Lepidopus calcar, Parin & Mikhailin, 1982 (Hawaiian ridge scabbardfish)
- Lepidopus caudatus, (Euphrasen, 1788) (Silver scabbardfish)
- Lepidopus dubius, Parin & Mikhailin, 1981 (Doubtful scabbardfish)
- Lepidopus fitchi , Rosenblatt & Wilson, 1987 (Fitch's scabbardfish)
- Lepidopus manis, Rosenblatt & Wilson, 1987 (Ghost scabbardfish)

== Bibliography ==
- D'Onghia, G., F. Mastrototaro i P. Maiorano, 2000. Biology of silver scabbard fish, Lepidopus caudatus (Trichiuridae), from the Ionian Sea (Eastern-Central Mediterranean). Cybium 24(3):249-262.
- Fritzsche, R.A., 1982. Osteichthyes. A: Parker, S.P., Synopsis and Classification of Living Organisms, vol. 2. McGraw-Hill, New York: 858-944.
- Parin, N. V. & Mikhailin, S. V., 1981. A new species of cutlassfish, Lepidopus dubius (Trichiuridae), from the eastern tropical Atlantic Ocean. Voprosy Ikhtiologii v. 21 (núm. 3): 403-410.
- Parin, N. V. & Mikhailin, S. V., 1982. Lepidopus calcar, a new trichiurid fish from the Hawaiian underwater ridge. Japanese Journal of Ichthyology v. 29 (n. 1): 27-30.
- Portsev, P.I. i Y.K. Nikolaev, 1984. First discovery of frostfish, Lepidopus caudatus (Trichiuridae), in the Black sea. J. Ichthyol. 24(2):108
- Rosenblatt, R. H. & Wilson, R. R. Jr., 1987. Cutlassfishes of the genus Lepidopus (Trichiuridae), with two new eastern Pacific species. Japanese Journal of Ichthyology v. 33 (n. 4): 342-351.
- Rosenblatt, R. H. & Wilson, R. R., Jr., 1987. Cutlassfishes of the genus Lepidopus (Trichiuridae), with two new eastern Pacific species. Japanese Journal of Ichthyology v. 33 (núm. 4): 342-351.
- Tuset, V.M., J.A. González, J.I. Santana, A. Moreno-Lopez i M.M. Garcia-Diaz, 2006. Reproductive pattern and growth in Lepidopus caudatus (Osteichthyes, Trichiuridae) from the Canary Islands (Eastern-Central Atlantic). Electronic Journal of ichthyology 1:26-37.
