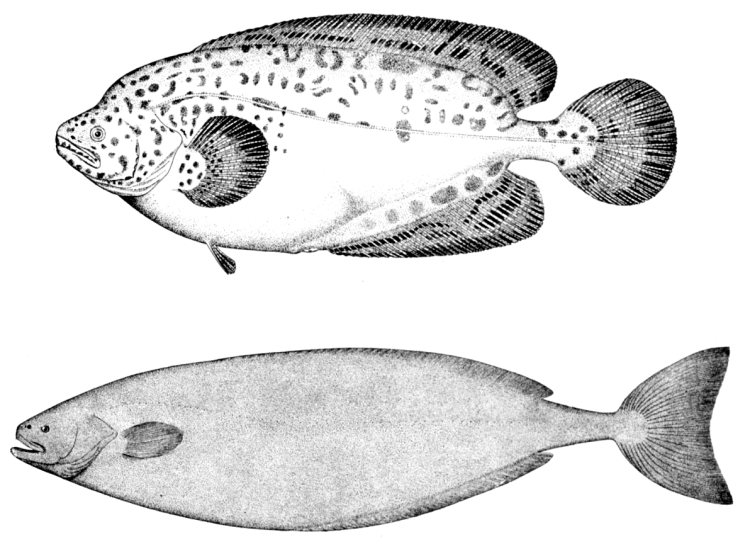
- Juvenile (top) and adult

Scientific classification
- Kingdom: Animalia
- Phylum: Chordata
- Class: Actinopterygii
- Order: Scombriformes
- Suborder: Scombroidei
- Family: Icosteidae; D. S. Jordan & C. H. Gilbert, 1880
- Genus: Icosteus; Lockington, 1880
- Species: I. aenigmaticus

Binomial name
- Icosteus aenigmaticus Lockington, 1880

Synonyms
- Genus: Acrotus T. H. Bean, 1888; Schedophilopsis Steindachner, 1881; Species: Schedophilopsis spinosus Steindachner, 1881; Acrotus willoughbyi T. H. Bean, 1888

= Ragfish =

Species of ray-finned fish

The ragfish (Icosteus aenigmaticus) is a ray-finned fish of the northern Pacific Ocean; although classified as a bony fish, its skeleton is mostly cartilage, and the larvae have pelvic fins that disappear as they mature. It is the sole member of the family Icosteidae within the order Scombriformes.

The ragfish body is scaleless and limp, because of its cartilaginous skeleton and its flabby muscles. None of the fins have any spines. The dorsal and anal fins extend much of the length of the body, while the pelvic fins are absent. The coloration is generally a dark brown, and maximum known length is 2 m.

Ragfishes are found on the bottom from near the surface in the case of juveniles to 732 m (2,402 ft), occasionally down to 1,420 m (4,660 ft), for the adults. They are said to eat jellyfishes, other fish, squid, and octopus, although recent catches show no squid beaks but large numbers of jellyfish. Ragfish are rarely seen and little is known about them.

The larvae make a remarkable transformation as they mature; the dorsal fin and anal fin both shrink, and the pelvic fins disappear.

Formerly, adult ragfishes were considered to be a different species, known then as Acrotus willoughbyi.
