= New Guinea hairtail =

Scientific classification
- Kingdom: Animalia
- Phylum: Chordata
- Class: Actinopterygii
- Order: Scombriformes
- Family: Trichiuridae
- Subfamily: Trichiurinae
- Genus: Demissolinea; Burhanuddin & Iwatsuki, 2003
- Species: D. novaeguineensis

Binomial name
- Demissolinea novaeguineensis Burhanuddin & Iwatsuki, 2003

Species of ray-finned fish

The New Guinea hairtail (Demissolinea novaeguineensis) is a species of cutlassfish which is classified in the monotypic genus Demissolinea. It is known only from the type location Dolak Island off southwestern New Guinea.
