= Woodwardella =

Woodwardella Temporal range: Lower Eocene

Scientific classification
- Kingdom: Animalia
- Phylum: Chordata
- Class: Actinopterygii
- Division: Teleostei
- Order: Scombriformes
- Family: Scombridae
- Genus: †Woodwardella; Casier, 1966

Extinct genus of fishes

Woodwardella is an extinct genus of prehistoric bony fish that lived during the lower Eocene.

== See also ==
- Prehistoric fish
- List of prehistoric bony fish
