= Amarsipus =

Scientific classification
- Kingdom: Animalia
- Phylum: Chordata
- Class: Actinopterygii
- Order: Scombriformes
- Suborder: Stromateoidei
- Family: Amarsipidae; Haedrich, 1969
- Genus: Amarsipus; Haedrich, 1969
- Species: A. carlsbergi

Binomial name
- Amarsipus carlsbergi Haedrich, 1969

Genus of ray-finned fishes

Amarsipus is the sole genus in the bagless glassfish family, Amarsipidae. It contains the single species Amarsipus carlsbergi, the amarsipa, which is a small and slender fish that lives in equatorial parts of the Indian and Pacific Oceans. It is found at depths from 30 to 130 m (98 to 427 ft). It reaches 21.2 cm (8.3 in) in standard length. Molecular phylogenetic analysis has placed this family in the order Scombriformes within Pelagiaria; however, relationships between many pelagiarian lineages are poorly resolved and the nearest relatives of Amarsipidae remain unclear.
