= Trichiurides =

Scientific classification
- Domain: Eukaryota
- Kingdom: Animalia
- Phylum: Chordata
- Class: Actinopterygii
- Genus: †Trichiurides; Winkler, 1876

Extinct genus of fishes

Trichiurides is an extinct genus of prehistoric bony fish.

== See also ==
- Prehistoric fish
- List of prehistoric bony fish
