= Bengt Anders Euphrasén =

Swedish naturalist (1756–1796)

- Born: 1756; Västergötland, Sweden
- Died: 25 December 1796; Stockholm, Sweden
- Scientific career
- Fields: Botany
- Author abbrev. (botany): Euphrasén

Bengt Anders Euphrasén (born 1756 in the parish of Habo, historical province of Västergötland, Sweden; died 25 December 1796 in Stockholm) was a Swedish botanist. Euphrasén studied at the veterinary school in Skara and then entered Uppsala University where he graduated in 1784.

In 1788, with the support of the Royal Swedish Academy of Sciences, Euphrasén made a natural history trip to the Antilles, which included Saint Barthélemy and Saint Christopher island (today Saint Kitts). After his return, Euphrasén was appointed assistant professor ("deputy demonstrator") of botany in Stockholm.

== Publications ==
- Beskrifning öfver svenska vestindiska ön St. Barthelemi, samt öarne St. Eustache och St. Christopher. Stockholm, 1795. Published in German translation as Reise nach der schwedisch-westindischen Insel St. Barthelemi, und den Inseln St. Eustache und St. Christoph; oder Beschreibung der Sitten, Lebensart der Einwohner, Lage, Beschaffenheit und natürlichen Produkte dieser Inseln. Göttingen, 1798. (Raja Narinar p. 105 and image inside back cover)
