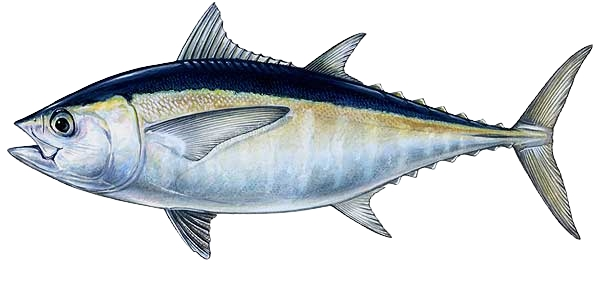
- Blackfin tuna (Thunnus atlanticus)

Scientific classification
- Kingdom: Animalia
- Phylum: Chordata
- Class: Actinopterygii
- Division: Teleostei
- Clade: Percomorpha
- Order: Scombriformes; Bleeker, 1859

Families
- See text

Synonyms
- Pelagia Miya et al., 2013; Pelagiaria Betancur-R et al., 2013

= Scombriformes =

Scombriformes Temporal range: Danian–present

Order of ray-finned fishes

Scombriformes, also known as Pelagia or Pelagiaria, is an order of ray-finned fish within the clade Percomorpha. It contains 287 extant species in 16 families, most of which were previously classified under the suborders Scombroidei and Stromateoidei of the order Perciformes.

The earliest known scombriform is the scombrid Landanichthys from the Middle Paleocene of Angola.

== Taxonomic history and definition ==
The order Scombriformes was originally established in 1859 by the Dutch physician and ichthyologist Pieter Bleeker. However, the taxa assigned to this group were later placed within the order Perciformes, specifically in the suborder Scombroidei (mackerel-like fishes).

With the advent of cladistics and DNA comparison methods for phylogenetic analysis, it became evident that the traditional Scombroidei was not a monophyletic group (a natural clade). Consequently, an attempt by E. O. Wiley and G. David Johnson to remove Scombroidei from Perciformes and elevate it to the order Scombriformes did not result in a monophyletic order, as it did not account for emerging DNA evidence regarding relationships among percomorphs.

In a 2013 revision of bony fish systematics by Ricardo Betancur-R and colleagues, Scombriformes was redefined with a new composition, comprising 16 families that had previously been assigned to six different suborders of Perciformes. This relationship was subsequently confirmed by Thomas J. Near and colleagues in their phylogenetic study of Acanthomorpha.

In mid-2013, Masaki Miya, Matt Friedman, and colleagues described a clade with the same composition under the new name **Pelagia**, referencing the fact that these are predominantly pelagic fishes inhabiting the open ocean.

Miya and Friedman defined Pelagia as a node-based taxon comprising the most recent common ancestor of the following species and all its descendants:

- Trichiurus lepturus (Largehead hairtail)
- Gempylus serpens (Snake mackerel)
- Ruvettus pretiosus (Oilfish)
- Platyberyx opalescens
- Icosteus aenigmaticus (Ragfish)
- Taractes asper (Rough pomfret)
- Scombrolabrax heterolepis (Longfin escolar)
- Icichthys lockingtoni (Medusafish)
- Tetragonurus cuvieri (Smalleye squaretail)
- Chiasmodon niger (Black swallower)
- Pampus argenteus (Silver pomfret)
- Ariomma indicum (Indian ariomma)
- Psenes cyanophrys (Freckled driftfish)
- Pomatomus saltatrix (Bluefish)
- Arripis trutta (Kahawai)
- Scomber scombrus (Atlantic mackerel)

== Characteristics ==
The close relationship of the groups currently assigned to Scombriformes is based primarily on molecular biological studies and is not yet supported by unique morphological traits (synapomorphies) for the order as a whole. However, the monophyly of the suborder Stromateoidei is supported by eight morphological synapomorphies. In general, the majority of species are pelagic, open-ocean dwellers.

== Fossil record ==
The earliest known members of the group are unnamed members of Scombridae and Trichiuroidea from the Paleocene (Danian) strata from the Dakhla Formation (Egypt) and the scombrid Landanichthys from the Middle Paleocene of Angola. The fossil family †Carangodidae is known from the Eocene of Italy.

== Taxonomy ==
Scombriformes includes the following families:

- Suborder Stromateoidei
  - Family Amarsipidae (amarsipa)
  - Family Centrolophidae (medusafishes)
  - Family Nomeidae (driftfishes)
  - Family Tetragonuridae (squaretails)
  - Family Ariommatidae (ariommas)
  - Family Stromateidae (butterfishes)
  - Family †Propercarinidae
- Suborder Scombroidei
  - Family Pomatomidae (bluefishes)
  - Family Icosteidae (ragfish)
  - Family Arripidae (Australasian salmon (kahawai))
  - Family Chiasmodontidae (swallowers)
  - Family Scombridae
    - Subfamily Gasterochismatinae (butterfly kingfish)
    - Subfamily Scombrinae (mackerels, bonitos and tunas)
  - Family Caristiidae (manefishes)
  - Family Bramidae (pomfrets)
  - Family Scombrolabracidae (longfin escolar)
  - Family †Euzaphlegidae
  - Family Gempylidae (snake mackerels, escolar)
  - Family Trichiuridae (cutlassfishes)
    - Subfamily Aphanopodinae (frostfishes)
    - Subfamily Lepidopodinae (scabbardfishes)
    - Subfamily Trichiurinae (hairtails)

=== Phylogeny ===
The phylogenetic relationships within Scombriformes are shown in this cladogram from Near & Thacker (2024):

- Scombriformes
  - Arripis
  - - - pan‑stromateoids
        - †Pinichthys
        - - Stromateidae
          - - Ariomma
            - Nomeidae
    - - - Icosteus aenigmaticus
        - - Centrolophidae
          - pan‑pomatomids
            - †Carangopsis
            - Pomatomus saltatrix
      - - - Scombridae
          - - Amarsipus carlsbergi
            - - Tetragonurus
              - pan‑chiasmodontids
                - †Bannikovichthys
                - Chiasmodontidae
        - - - Bramidae
            - Caristiidae
          - - Scombrolabrax heterolepis
            - pan‑gempyloids
              - †Argestichthys
              - - Lepidocybium flavobrunneum
                - - Gempylidae
                  - - †Anenchelum
                    - Trichiuridae
