= Pampus candidus =

Scientific classification
- Kingdom: Animalia
- Phylum: Chordata
- Class: Actinopterygii
- Order: Scombriformes
- Family: Stromateidae
- Genus: Pampus
- Species: P. candidus

Binomial name
- Pampus candidus (Cuvier, 1829)

Synonyms
- Stromateus candidus Cuvier, 1829

Species of fish

Pampus candidus (commonly known as the white pomfret) is a species of fish in the genus Pampus of the family Stromateidae. It is distributed along the northern coastal waters of the Indian Ocean and was long regarded as part of Pampus argenteus (the silver pomfret).

== Classification ==
This species was originally described in 1829 by Georges Cuvier under the scientific name Stromateus candidus. However, it was later considered a synonym of Pampus argenteus until 2019, when Indian ichthyologists, based on molecular genetics and comparative anatomy, reclassified it as an independent species.

Compared to the silver pomfret, Pampus candidus is genetically more closely related to Pampus cinereus (the grey pomfret). Their phylogenetic relationship is as follows:：

- Pampus
  - - - - P. cinereus
        - P. liuorum
      - P. candidus
    - - P. chinensis
      - P. punctatissimus
  - - P. argenteus
    - P. minor

== Distribution ==
This species is found along the northern coastal waters of the Indian Ocean, ranging from the Persian Gulf in the west, southward to Sri Lanka, and eastward to the Bay of Bengal.
