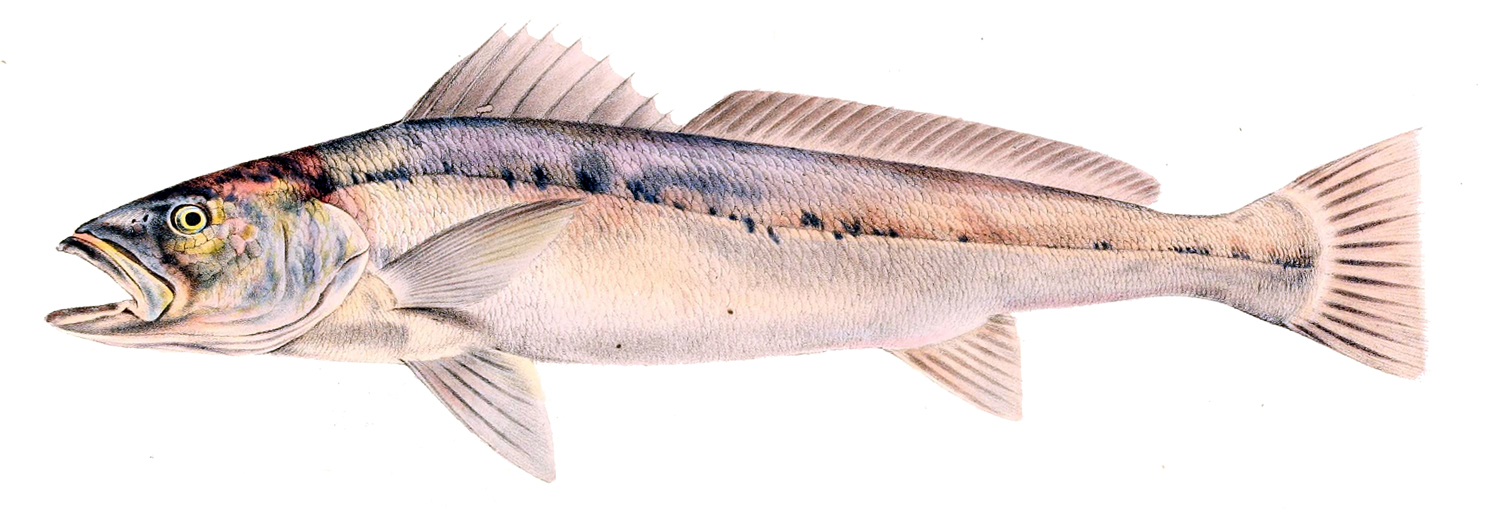

Conservation status
- Data Deficient (IUCN 3.1)

Scientific classification
- Kingdom: Animalia
- Phylum: Chordata
- Class: Actinopterygii
- Division: Teleostei
- Order: Acanthuriformes
- Family: Sciaenidae
- Genus: Argyrosomus
- Species: A. hololepidotus

Binomial name
- Argyrosomus hololepidotus (Lacépède, 1801)

Synonyms
- Labrus hololepidotus Lacépède, 1801; Johnius hololepidotus (Lacépède, 1801); Pseudosciaena hololepidota (Lacépède, 1801); Sciaena hololepidota (Lacépède, 1801)

= Argyrosomus hololepidotus =

Species of fish

Argyrosomus hololepidotus, also known as the Madagascar meagre or southern meagre, is a species of marine ray-finned fish belonging to the family Sciaenidae, the drums and croakers. The species is endemic to Madagascar and the Indian Ocean.

== Taxonomy ==
Argyrosomus hololepidotus was first formally described as Labrus hololepidotus in 1801 by the French naturalist Bernard Germain de Lacépède with its type locality given as "Grand Océan équatorial", considered to be Fort Dauphin in southeastern Madagascar. This species was thought by some authorities to be a synonym of A. japonicus but in 1995 two new species, A. coronus and A. inodorus, were described from off Southern Africa, which had all been thought to be conspecific with A. japonicus. The identity of this species was also confirmed in this paper and neotypes were designated for this species and A. japonicus. This fish belongs to the family Sciaenidae in the order Acanthuriformes. The specific name, hololepidotus, was not explained by Lacépède but it possibly reflects his comment that the scales on the head and operculum are similar to the scales on the back.

== Description ==
Argyrosomus hololepidotus has 11 spines in its dorsal fin with 10 in front of the incision which almost divides that fin and 1 behind it along with between 25 and 29 soft rays. The anal fin is supported by 2 spines and 7 soft rays. The standard length is 3.7 to 3.8 times the body's depth. The fold in the axillary of the pectoral fin is naked and the part of the lateral line near the head is moderately curved. Both sexes have drumming muscles. The colour of the body is silvery grey darkening on the upper body to bluish with a bronze sheen on the sides and back and a white breast and belly. The pelvic fins and anal fin are off white, with a grey streak while the dorsal, pectoral and caudal fins are brownish grey. This species has a maximum published total length of 200 cm (79 in), although 100 cm (39 in) is more typical, and a maximum published weight of 71 kg (157 lb).

== Distribution and habitat ==
Argyrosomus hololepidotus is considered to be endemic to the waters off eastern Madagascar, where it is most numerous in the southeast. Reports from the west coast of Madagascar require confirmation and records from the southern African coast are thought to refer to congeners. They occur in the lower reaches of rivers, estuaries, on rocky reefs, off ocean beaches and on the continental shelf as deep as 150 m (490 ft).

== Biology ==
Argyrosomus hololepidotus feeds mostly nocturnally or in turbid waters. Its prey includes cuttlefish, fishes, crabs, prawns and polychaetes. They can live for up to 39 years.

== Fisheries ==
Argyrosomus hololepidotus is targeted by artisanal fishermen with dugout canoes and handlines at depths between 20 and 40 m (66 and 131 ft) and in estuaries with nets.
