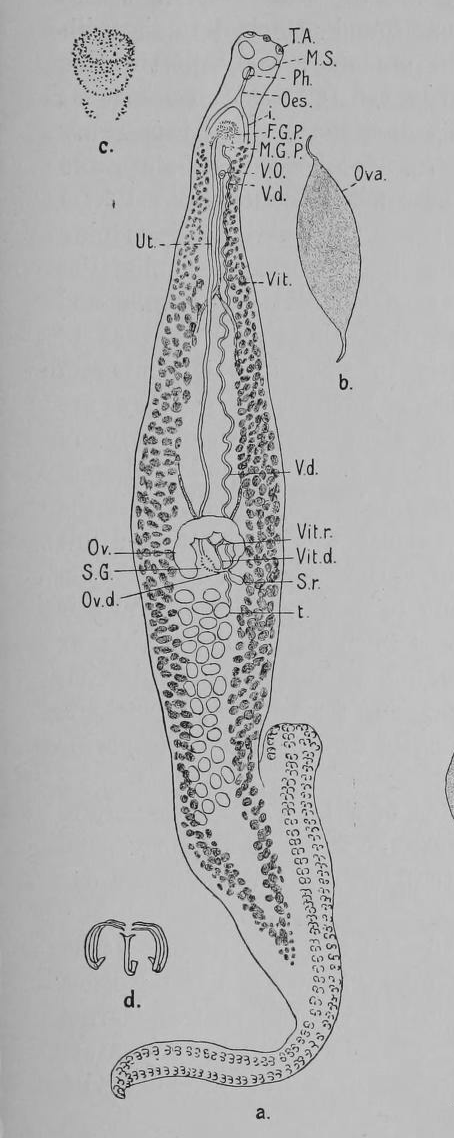
- Microcotyle poronoti, drawing from original description

Scientific classification
- Kingdom: Animalia
- Phylum: Platyhelminthes
- Class: Monogenea
- Order: Mazocraeidea
- Family: Microcotylidae
- Genus: Microcotyle
- Species: M. poronoti

Binomial name
- Microcotyle poronoti MacCallum, 1915

Synonyms
- Microcotyle (Microcotyle) poronoti (MacCallum, 1915) Unnithan, 1971

= Microcotyle poronoti =

Species of worm

Microcotyle poronoti is a species of monogenean, parasitic on the gills of a marine fish. It belongs to the family Microcotylidae.

== Systematics ==
Microcotyle poronoti was first described by MacCallum in 1915, based on a few specimens recovered from the gills of the butterfish Poronotus triacanthus (currently Peprilus triacanthus), brought to the U. S. Fish Commission Laboratories at Woods Hole, Massachusetts.

This species was redescribed by Linton (1940) based on 3 specimens from the gills of the type-host and from the type-locality and was discussed superficially only. Linton noted that his specimens differed from those described by MacCallum (1915) by the anterior suckers being biloculate with a distinct costa in each. McMahon (1964) also redescribed this species based on 14 specimens from the gills of the type-host off Chesapeake Bay, United States and noted that his specimens differed from M. poronoti by body length and width, number and size of clamps, shape and number of testes, position of the genital atrium, and the presence of an armed ventral pore posterior to the genital atrium. Sproston (1946) considered the egg measurements given by MacCallum (1915) erroneous. McMahon (1964) compared his measurements with those of MacCallum and suggested that egg length measurements are in proportion to adult body length. Unnithan (1971) placed Microcotyle poronoti in the nominal subgenus Microcotyle as Microcotyle (Microcotyle) poronoti. However, this species was returned to the genus Microcotyle by Mamaev in 1986.

Kingston et al.,(1969) described and illustrated the oncomiracidium of M. poronoti.

== Morphology ==
Microcotyle poronoti has the general morphology of all species of Microcotyle, with a symmetrical body, comprising an anterior part which contains most organs and a posterior part called the haptor. The haptor is symmetrical and long (about one-third of the whole length), and bears 120 clamps, arranged as two rows, one on each side. The clamps of the haptor attach the animal to the gill of the fish. There are also two buccal suckers at the anterior extremity. The digestive organs include an anterior, terminal mouth, a pharynx, an oesophagus and a posterior intestine with two lateral branches provided with numerous secondary branches. Each adult contains male and female reproductive organs. The reproductive organs include an anterior oval genital atrium, armed with numerous short triangular spines, a medio-dorsal vagina, a single ovary, and 32 large testes which are posterior to the ovary. The eggs are provided with a short filament at each end without a long finely coiled filament as in some other Microcotyle species.

== Etymology ==
The specific name poronoti is derived from the generic name of the host species Poronotus triacanthus.

== Hosts and localities ==
The butterfish Poronotus triacanthus (Stromateidae) (currently Peprilus triacanthus) is the type-host of Microcotyle poronoti. Microcotyle poronoti has been first described from fish caught off Woods Hole, Massachusetts.
