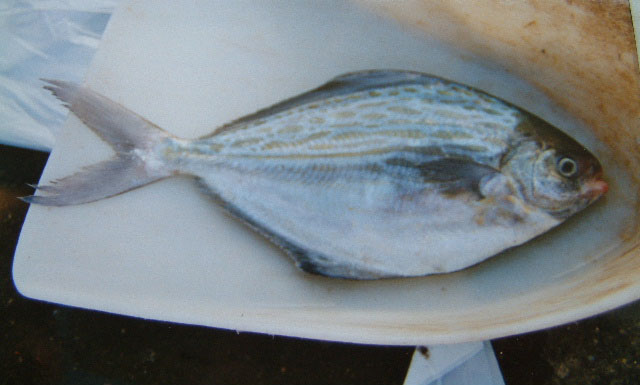
- Dead specimen collected by trawl net in Naples area
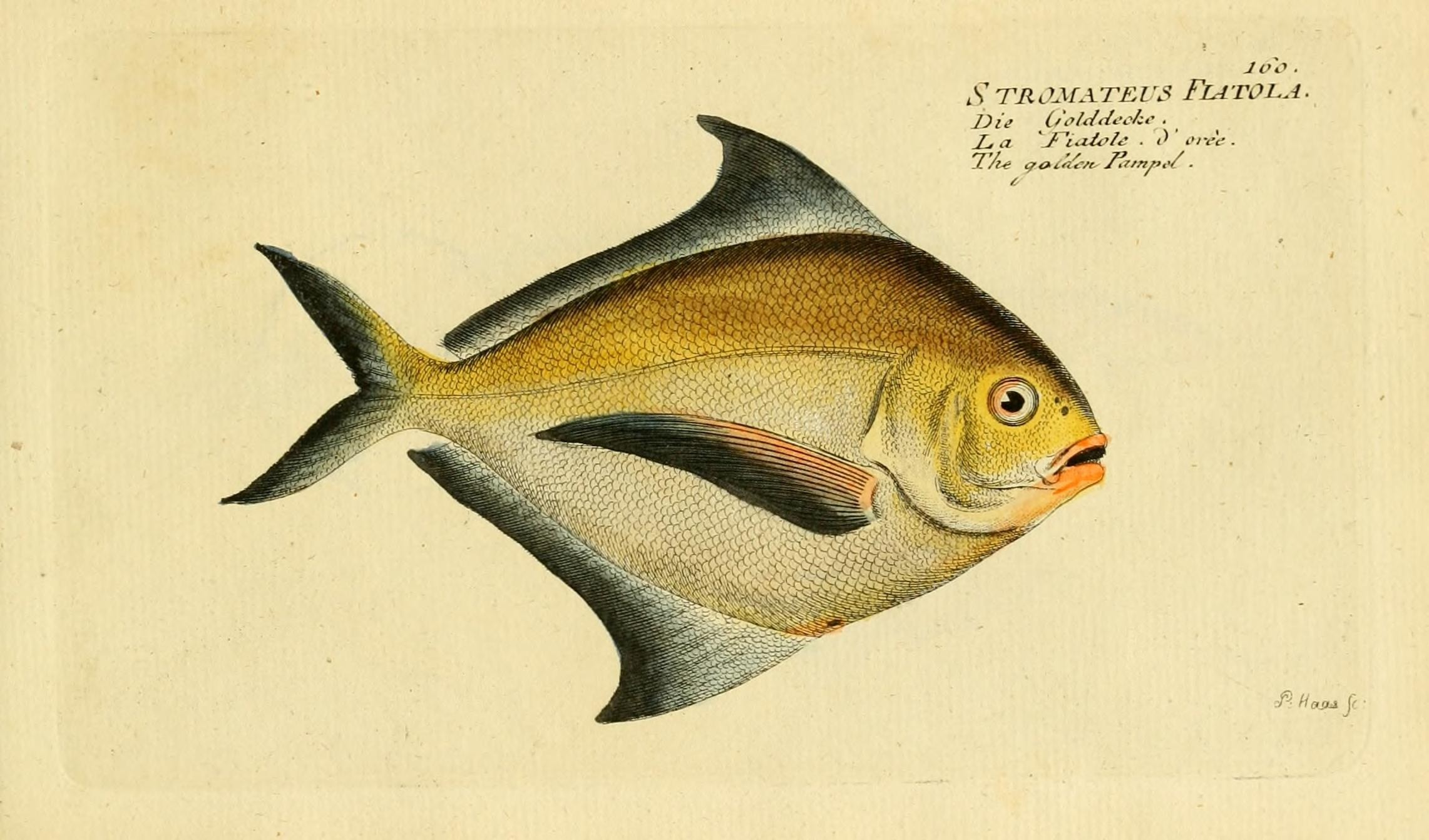

Conservation status
- Least Concern (IUCN 3.1)

Scientific classification
- Kingdom: Animalia
- Phylum: Chordata
- Class: Actinopterygii
- Division: Teleostei
- Order: Scombriformes
- Family: Stromateidae
- Genus: Stromateus
- Species: S. fiatola

Binomial name
- Stromateus fiatola Linnaeus, 1758

Synonyms
- Chrysostromus fiatoloides Lacépède, 1802; Fiatola fasciata Risso, 1827; Seserinus microchirus Cuvier, 1833; Stromateus capensis Pappe, 1853; Stromateus fasciatus (Risso, 1827); Stromateus microchirus (Cuvier, 1833)

= Blue butterfish =

Species of fish

The blue butterfish (Stromateus fiatola), is a species of pelagic fish in the genus Stromateus.

== Description ==
The blue butterfish usually grows about 40 cm (16 in), but the largest length of the blue butterfish that has been recorded was 50 cm (20 in). Dorsal soft rays (total): 42–50 cm; Anal soft rays: 33 – 38 cm. Blue to brownish in color and darker spots dorsally, silver to whitish ventrally; juveniles with vertical bars on body and small black pelvic fins.

== Distribution and habitat ==
The blue butterfish is a pelagic fish, usually found in depths of 10–70 m (33–230 ft). It mainly lives in the Atlantic Ocean and is widely distributed in the eastern Atlantic Ocean, specifically in the Bay of Biscay, the Mediterranean, southward of the cape of good hope, and South Africa. This fish can also be found in the Red Sea.

== Diet ==
The blue butterfish feeds on smaller fishes, jellyfish, and zooplankton. This fish is part of the trophic guild, planktotrophic, which means that they have a long pelagic larval stage and feed on their prey while suspended in the water column. The blue butterfish is also referred to as a pelagic mesopredator due to feeding on smaller animals within the pelagic zone.

== Reproduction ==
The blue butterfish undergoes sexual reproduction. The reproduction is both oviparous ( female animals that lay their eggs, with little or no other embryonic development within the mother) and iteroparous (an organism that can undergo many reproductive events within its lifetime).

== Cultural ==
Names of blue butterfish in other languages as follows: Bukla (Albanian), Ψευτολίτσα (Pseftolitsa) (Greek), Palometa fiatola (Spanish), Fieto (Italian), Blauer Butterfisch (German), Żuwak fiatola (Polish), Pampo-godinho (Portuguese), Фиатола (Fiatola) (Russian), Plotica morska (Serbian, Croatian), Figa (Slovenian), Yıldız balığı (Turkish), Fiatole (French).

== See also ==
- Silver pomfret
- Harvestfish
