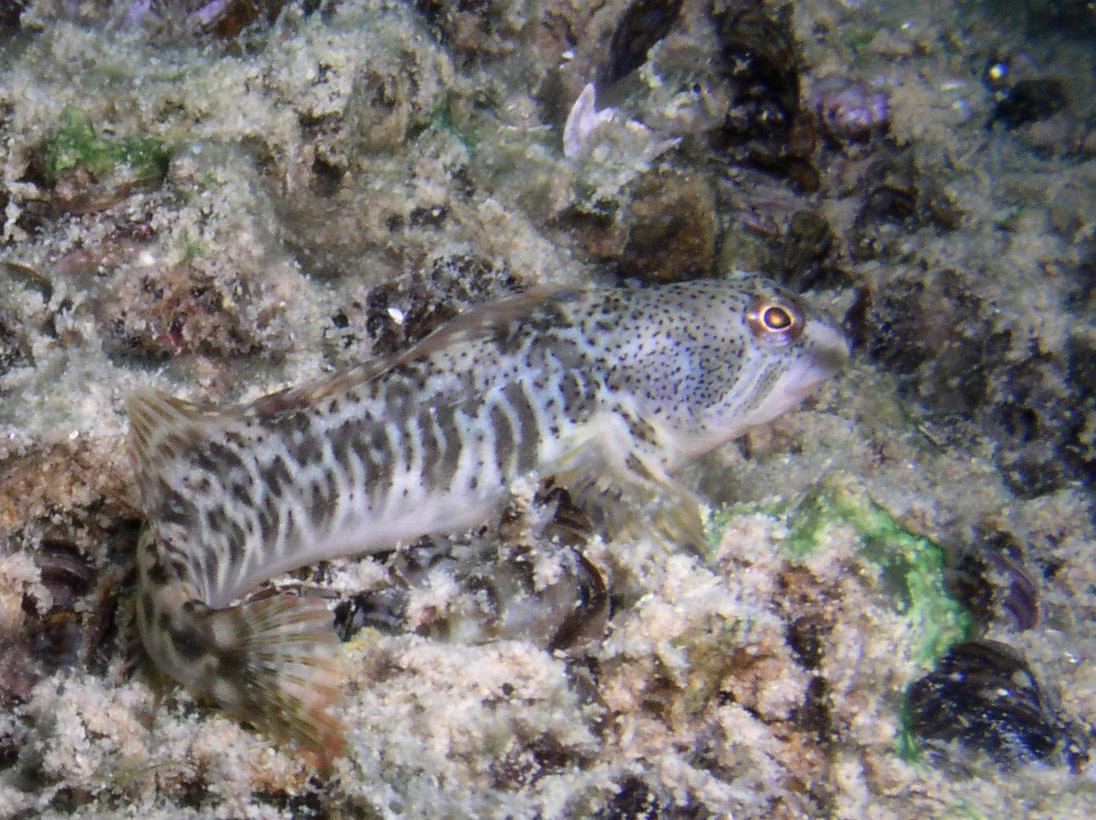
- Salariopsis fluviatilis

Scientific classification
- Kingdom: Animalia
- Phylum: Chordata
- Class: Actinopterygii
- Order: Blenniiformes
- Family: Blenniidae
- Subfamily: Salariinae
- Genus: Salariopsis; Vecchioni et al. 2022

Species
- See text

= Salariopsis =

Genus of freshwater fish

Salariopsis is a genus of freshwater fish in the family Blenniidae. It was formerly included in Salaria which now contains only marine species.

== Species ==
Following the marine/freshwater split, five species are recognized in this genus:

- Salariopsis atlantica Doadrio, Perea & Yahyaoui, 2011
- Salariopsis burcuae Yoğurtçuoğlu, Kaya, Atalay, Ekmekçi & Freyhof, 2023
- Salariopsis economidisi Kottelat, 2004 (Trichonis blenny)
- Salariopsis fluviatilis (Asso, 1801) (Freshwater blenny)
- Salariopsis renatorum Yoğurtçuoğlu, Kaya, Atalay, Ekmekçi & Freyhof, 2023
