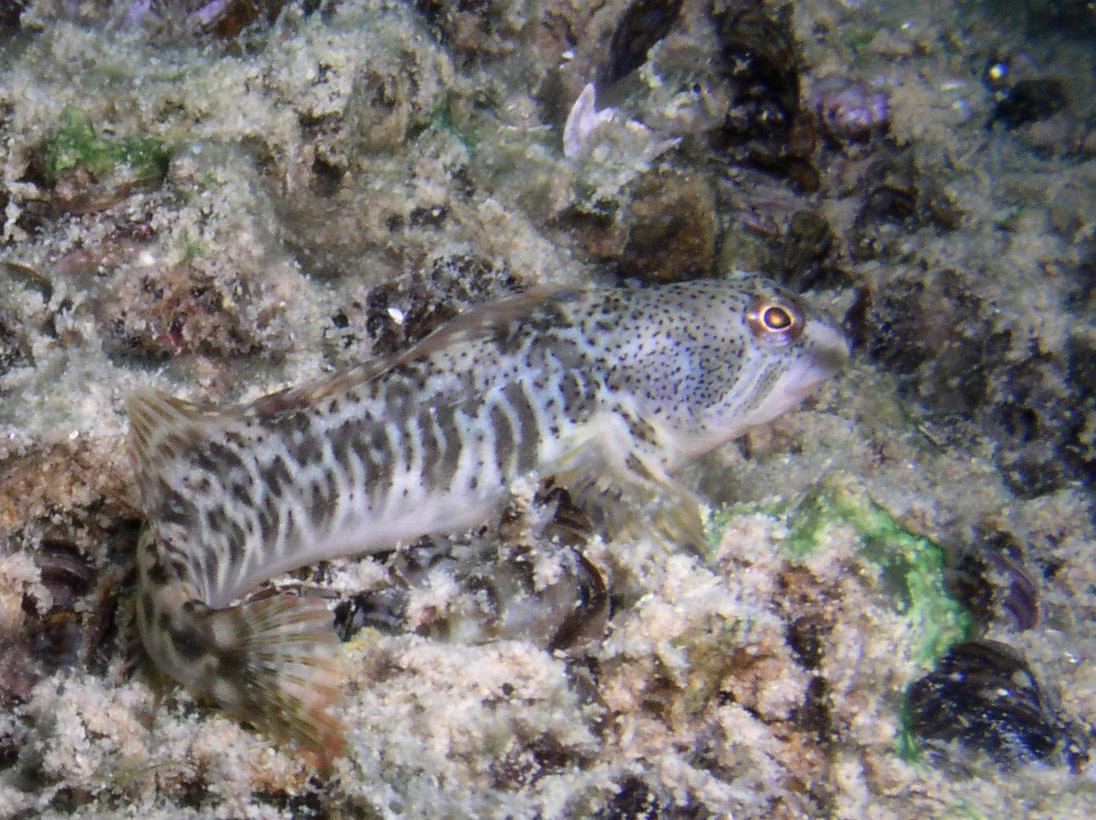

Conservation status
- Least Concern (IUCN 3.1)

Scientific classification
- Kingdom: Animalia
- Phylum: Chordata
- Class: Actinopterygii
- Division: Teleostei
- Order: Blenniiformes
- Family: Blenniidae
- Genus: Salariopsis
- Species: S. fluviatilis

Binomial name
- Salariopsis fluviatilis (Asso y del Rio, 1801)

Synonyms
- List: Blennius fluviatilis Asso y del Rio, 1801; Salaria fluviatilis (Asso y del Rio, 1801); Ichthyocoris fluviatilis (Asso y del Rio, 1801); Blennius frater Bloch & Schneider, 1801; Blennius fluviatilis Rafinesque, 1810; Blennius vulgaris Pollini, 1816; Salarias varus Risso, 1827; Blennius cagnota Valenciennes, 1836; Blennius inaequalis Valenciennes, 1836; Blennius anticolus Bonaparte, 1840; Blennius lupulus Bonaparte, 1840; Ichthyocoris pollinii Bonaparte, 1844; Blennius alpestris Blanchard, 1866

= Freshwater blenny =

Species of fish

The freshwater blenny (Salariopsis fluviatilis) is a species of freshwater and brackish water ray-finned fish belonging to the family Blenniidae, the combtooth blennies. This species is found in Southern Europe, Western Asia and North Africa.

== Taxonomy ==
The freshwater blenny was first formally described as Blennius fluviatilis in 1801 by the Spanish diplomat, lawyer, naturalist and historian Ignacio Jordán Claudio de Asso y del Río with its type locality given as the Ebro River, Zaeagoza, Spain. In 2022 Luca Vecchioni, Andrew C. Ching, Frederico Marrone, Marco Arculeo, Peter J. Hundt and Andrew M. Simons carried out a phylogenetic study of the combtooth blennies and revised the taxonomy and phylogeny of the genus Salarias sensu lato, proposing a new genus Salariopsis with Blennius fluviatilis designated as its type species. The freshwater blenny is the type species of the genus Salariopsis which is classified within the subfamily Salarinae of the family Blennidae.

This taxon may be paraphyletic as the populations in Turkey and Israel are more genetically divergent from other populations of freshwater blenny than the Trichonis blenny, and the population in Kinneret Lake in Israel has been proposed as a new species.

== Etymology ==
The freshwater blenny is classified in the genus Salariopsis, a name which suffixes -opsis, meaning "having the form of", on to Salaria, an allusion to its seeming, and deceptive, similarity in appearance to that genus. The Specific name, fluviatilis, means "of a river" and is a reference to the occurrence of this species in freshwater,

== Description ==
The freshwater blenny has the dorsal fin supported by 12 or 13 spines and 16 or 17 soft rays while the anal fin contains 2 spines and between 17 and 19 soft rays. There is a wide band of small dots running diagonally backwards and downwards from the eye and there is a branched cirrus above the eyes. This species reaches a maximum total length of 15.4 cm (6.1 in), although 8 cm (3.1 in) is more typical.

== Distribution and habitat ==
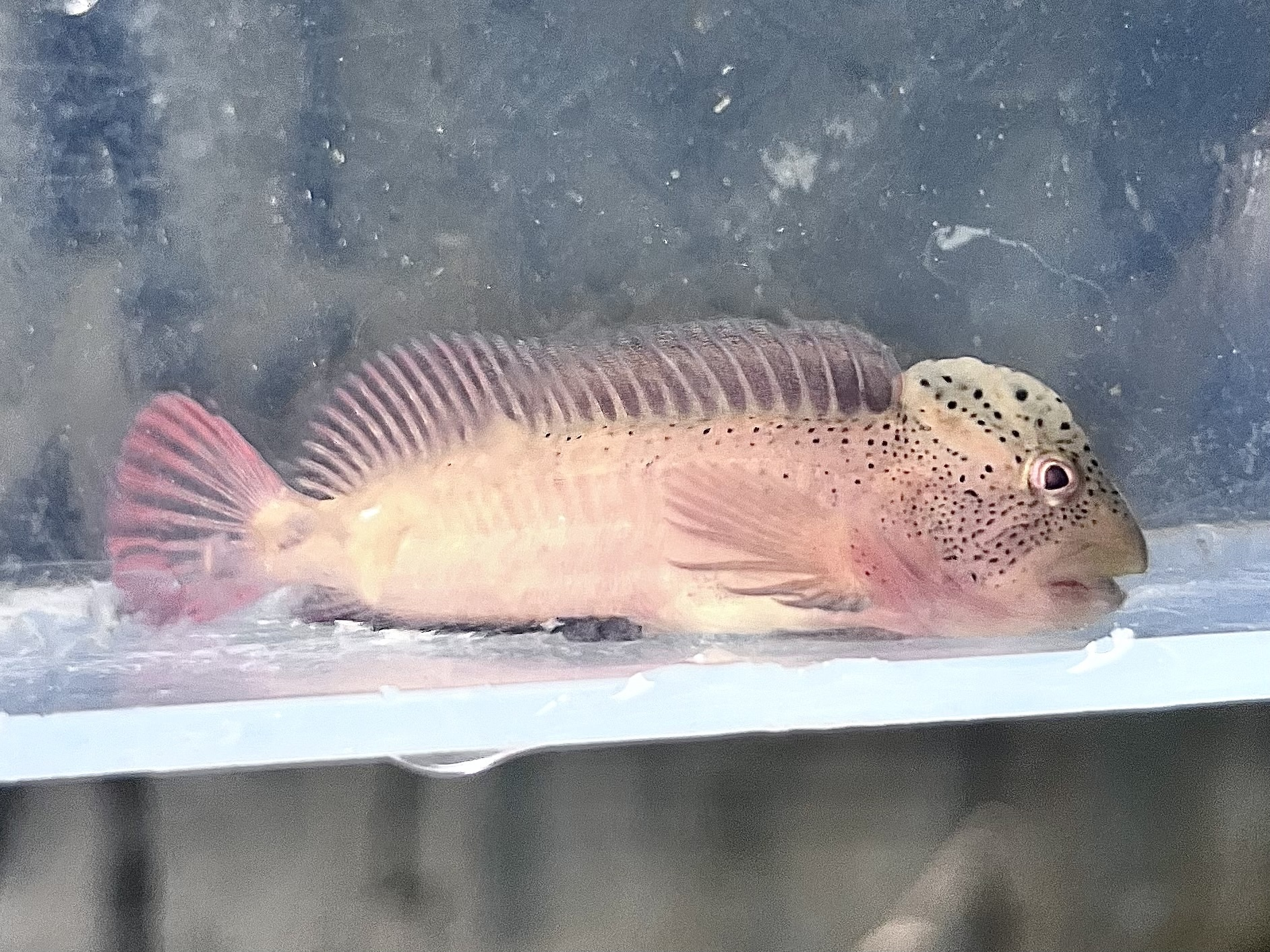
In France

The freshwater blenny is found in southern Europe from Portugal east to western Anatolia, as well as on the islands of Corsica, Sardinia, Sicily, Euboea, Crete, Icaria, Lesbos, Corfu and Rhodes, with a population in a few streams draining into the Gulf of Béjaïa in Algeria. It formerly occurred on Cyprus but damming and malaria control in the 20th Century led to its probable local extinction on that island. The freshwater blenny is found in unpolluted stretches of rivers and streams with moderate to fast current and where the streambed is made up of gravel, rocks and stones. It can be found in large lakes, where it occurs along rocky shorelines.
