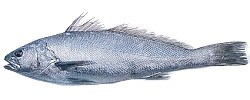
- Argyrosomus regius

Scientific classification
- Kingdom: Animalia
- Phylum: Chordata
- Class: Actinopterygii
- Division: Teleostei
- Order: Acanthuriformes
- Family: Sciaenidae
- Genus: Argyrosomus; De La Pylaie, 1835

Type species
- Argyrosomus procerus De la Pylaie, 1835

Synonyms
- Afroscion Trewavas, 1977; Pseudosciaena Bleeker, 1863

= Argyrosomus =

Argyrosomus Temporal range: Early Miocene–present

Genus of fishes in the drum family, Sciaenidae

Argyrosomus is a genus of marine ray-finned fishes belonging to the family Sciaenidae, the drums. The fish in this genus are large and are commonly targeted as game fish.

== Taxonomy ==
Argyrosomus was first proposed as a monospecific genus in 1835 by the French naturalist Jean Bachelot La Pylaie with Argyrosomus procerus, which La Pylaie had described from France as its only species. The description of A. procerus was based on Sciaena aquila Cuvier, 1816 and the type specimen is the same type specimen as Perca regia described by Ignacio Jordán Claudio de Asso y del Río in 1801. This genus is classified in the family Sciaenidae, which is placed within the suborder Sciaenoidei of the order Acanthuriformes in the 5th edition of Fishes of the World.

== Etymology ==
Argyrosomus is a combination of argyros, meaning "silver", with soma, which means "body"; this is presumed to refer to the pearly-silver coloration of the type species.

== Species ==
Argyrosomus contains the following valid species:

- Argyrosomus amoyensis (Bleeker, 1863) (Amoy croaker)
- Argyrosomus beccus Sasaki, 1994
- Argyrosomus coronus Griffiths & Heemstra, 1995 (Dusky kob)
- Argyrosomus heinii (Steindachner, 1902) (Arabian sea meagre)
- Argyrosomus hololepidotus (Lacépède, 1801) (Southern meagre)
- Argyrosomus inodorus Griffiths & Heemstra, 1995 (Mild meagre)
- Argyrosomus japonicus (Temminck & Schlegel,1843) (Japanese meagre)
- Argyrosomus regius (Asso y del Rio, 1801) (Meagre)
- Argyrosomus thorpei M. M. Smith, 1977 (Squaretail kob)

The following fossil species are known (species known only by isolated otoliths are referred as such):

- †Argyrosomus corii (Schubert, 1902) [otolith] (Middle Miocene of Austria)
- †Argyrosomus danicus Schwarzhans, 1993 [otolith] (Late Miocene of Denmark)
- †Argyrosomus holsaticus (Koken, 1891) [otolith] (Early Miocene of Germany)
- †Arygyrosomus limnicola Rückert-Ülkümen, 1991 (Late Miocene of Turkey)
- †Arygyrosomus moguntinus (Weiler, 1942) (Miocene of Germany)
- †Argyrosomus multipinnatus (Gorjanović-Kramberger, 1882) (Middle Miocene of Croatia)
- †Argyrosomus similis (Weiler, 1966) [otolith] (Early Miocene of the Czech Republic and Germany)
- †Argyrosomus speciosus (Koken, 1891) [otolith] - Late Oligocene of Germany

Fossil remains of indeterminate Argyrosomus have been identified from freshwater deposits of the Early Miocene of Germany, and marine deposits from the mid-late Miocene of Libya & Namibia in Africa, suggesting that it was a rather widespread fish even in the past.

== Characteristics ==
Argyrosomus meagres have a fairly elongated and moderately compressed body with a dorsal profile that is more convex than the ventral proflle. They have a terminal, slightly oblique mouth with jaws of equal length, or sometimes with a slightly protruding lower jaw. There are 3 pairs of pores and no barbel on the chin. The preoperculum is serrated and the operculum ends in a pair of flattened spines, which are frequently embedded in the skin. They have relatively short pectoral fins that have a dark fleshy axillary fold at upper end of base of the fin. The caudal fin is ponted in small juveniles and may be S-shaped, rhomboid, and rounded in young and adult fish. There are between 47 and 53 scales in the lateral line, typically 51. The tubules in the lateral line are tree-shaped and the scales extend to the end of the caudal fin. Both sexes may have drumming muscles around the swim bladder. These fishes are large, with the largest, the meagre (A. regius), attaining a maximum published total length of 230 cm (91 in).

== Distribution ==
Argyrosomus meagres are found in the eastern Atlantic, Indian and Western Pacific Oceans. Some species are known to enter freshwater, which appears to have been a longstanding trait of the genus.
