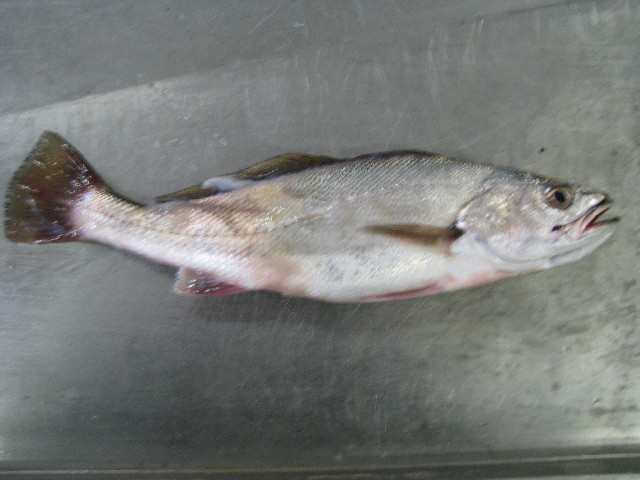

Conservation status
- Vulnerable (IUCN 3.1)

Scientific classification
- Kingdom: Animalia
- Phylum: Chordata
- Class: Actinopterygii
- Order: Acanthuriformes
- Family: Sciaenidae
- Genus: Argyrosomus
- Species: A. inodorus

Binomial name
- Argyrosomus inodorus Griffiths & Heemstra, 1995
- native range

= Argyrosomus inodorus =

Silver kob, a fish in the drum family Sciaenidae

Argyrosomus inodorus, the mild meagre or silver kob, is a species of marine ray-finned fish belonging to the family Sciaenidae, the drums and croakers. The species is found off southern Africa where it is an important target species for hook and line fisheries.

== Taxonomy ==
Argyrosomus inodorus was first formally described in 1995 by Marc H. Griffiths and Phil Heemstra with its type locality given as False Bay in the Western Cape. Previously this species had been thought to be conspecific with the Madagascar meagre (Argyrosomus hololepidotus), endemic to eastern Madagascan waters, as was the dusky kob (Argyrosomus coronus) which prefers warmer waters to the north of the distribution of that of the mild meagre. This fish belongs to the family Sciaenidae in the order Acanthuriformes. The specific name, inodorus, means "without scent" and is a reference to this species lack of a brassy aroma like that given off by A. japonicus in South African waters.

== Description ==
Argyrosomus inodorus has 11 spines in its dorsal fin with 10 in front of the incision which almost divides that fin and 1 behind it along with between 25 and 29 soft rays. The anal fin is supported by 2 spines and 7 soft rays. The standard length is 3.6 to 4.2 times the body's depth. The fold in the axillary of the pectoral fin is naked and the part of the lateral line near the head is moderately curved. Only the males have drumming muscles. The colour of the body is silvery darkening on the upper body to greenish-brown with a copper sheen on the sides and back, sometimes this is more noticeable on the head, and a white breast and belly. The dorsal fin and caudal fin are pale yellowish grey to greyish brown while the anal, pectoral and pelvic fins are whitish to brownish grey, but may sometimes be reddish, particularly the caudal fin. This species has a maximum published total length of 145 cm (57 in), although 115 cm (45 in) is more typical, and a maximum published weight of 36.3 kg (80 lb).

== Distribution and habitat ==
Argyrosomus inodorus is found in the southeastern Atlantic Ocean and the southwestern Indian Ocean from Cape Fria in Namibia southwards to Cape Agulhas and east along the South African coast to the Great Kei River. In South Africa this species is rare in estuaries and in the surf zone east of Cape Agulhas but is common in the surf zone in the cooler waters along the Atlantic coast of South Africa and Namibia. It is found at depths between 1 and 100 m (3 ft 3 in and 328 ft 1 in) but rarely below 10 m (33 ft) off Namibia due to an anoxic zone below that depth.

== Biology ==
Argyrosomus inodorus adults in the Namibian stock migrate in a southerly direction, swimming against the prevailing northwesterly currents on the surface, starting with the onset of the summer. They spawn in Sandwich and Meob Bays, situated to the southern limit of the distribution of that stock. Spawning takes place all year in South Africa, but the main spawning season runs from August to December, peaking in Spring, i.e. September to November, while in Namibia spawning takes place in October through to March. It has been suggested that the newly hatched larvae drift north with the current to the nursery areas. Once the juveniles have reached roughly 2 years of age they will slowly migrate northwards to the adult feeding grounds, the waters off the Skeleton Coast National Park. As water temperature decreases in the surf zone the adults finish spawning and return to their feeding ground, moving a little offshore and following the currents.

In South Africa, data from radiometric tags have shown that the adult fish are site faithful but will undertake infrequent long distance movements. These fish feed on both pelagic and demersal prey including anchovies (Engraulis capensis), round herring and hake, as well as shrimp and squid.

== Fisheries and conservation ==
Argyrosomus inodorus is the most important target species for hook and line fisheries in Namibia. Three different types of fisheries target this species in Namibia, there are commercial hook and line fishing boats, commercial ski-boats and recreational shore anglers. Each these fisheries have a mean combined catch of 1,000 t (980 long tons; 1,100 short tons). This species is also reportedly taken as bycatch by hake trawlers. It is also targeted in South Africa by similar fisheries as well as by beach seine netters. South Africa and Namibia introduced bag limits for recreational anglers and restrictions on commercial fisheries but these are not thought to be enough to halt recorded declines in the stocks.

The IUCN classifies this species a Vulnerable because all four known stocks, one in Namibia and three in South Africa were overfished and there have been declines in the populations in excess of 30% over the last three generations, each generation being assessed to be 12 years.
