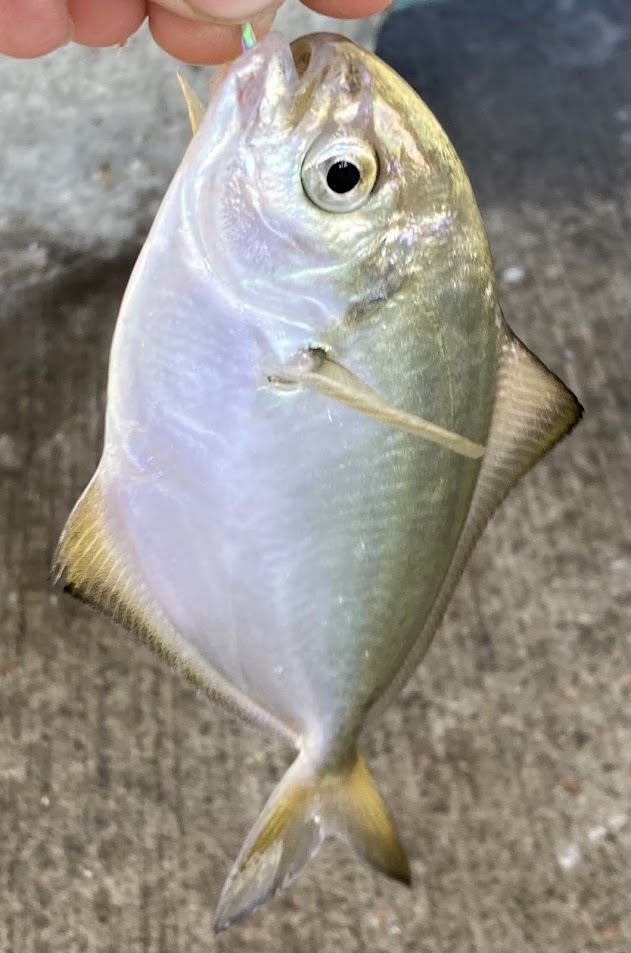

Conservation status
- Least Concern (IUCN 3.1)

Scientific classification
- Kingdom: Animalia
- Phylum: Chordata
- Class: Actinopterygii
- Order: Scombriformes
- Family: Stromateidae
- Genus: Peprilus
- Species: P. simillimus

Binomial name
- Peprilus simillimus (Ayres, 1860)

= Peprilus simillimus =

Species of ray-finned fish

Peprilus simillimus, also known as the Pacific Butterfish, Californian Pompano, or Pacific Pompano, is a silvery ray-finned fish in the family Stromateidae (butterfishes) of the order Scombriformes. It is not closely related to true pompanos, in the Carangidae family, however is closely related to the Pomfrets.

== Taxonomy and etymology ==
The species was first described in 1860 by ichthyologist William Ayres. The name comes from the Greek word "pepricos" in reference to local fish, and the Latin word "simillimus," meaning very similar, alluding to its resemblance to the Atlantic butterfish (P. triacanthus).

== Description ==
The Pacific pompano has an elliptical, oval-like body, and is deeply compressed (thin from the front). The body is a silvery and iridescent, with occasional olive or blue-green coloration on the back, and an olive-yellow on the upper head, and is covered with small scales.

The tail fin is deeply forked, and all fins have a yellow hue, with black around the edges. A unique feature of this fish is that it lacks pelvic fins. They have long anal and dorsal fins, with the dorsal having 3 spines and 45-47 soft rays.

Most individuals are under 20 cm (7.9 in) but can reach up to 36.1 cm (14.2 in) in TL.

== Biology and ecology ==
Peprilus simillimus prefers a subtropical climate and lives mainly in the Pacific Ocean, often over sandy bottoms in small but dense schools. It is found at a depth from to 9 to 312 m (30 to 1,020 ft), but is most frequently found in shallow waters. It lives a benthopelagic lifestyle, being either near the bottom or in the midwater column.

It ranges from Northern British Columbia to the tip of Baja California, including the Gulf of California and Puget Sound, and are more common in its southern ranges.

Like other butterfish, young fish tend to feed and take shelter in the tentacles of jellyfish. They may also school with other fish in the surfzone, like surfperches.

This species is oviparous, with pelagic eggs and larvae. They spawn near the surface of the water. Still, little is known about this species' mating habits and lifespan.

== Diet ==
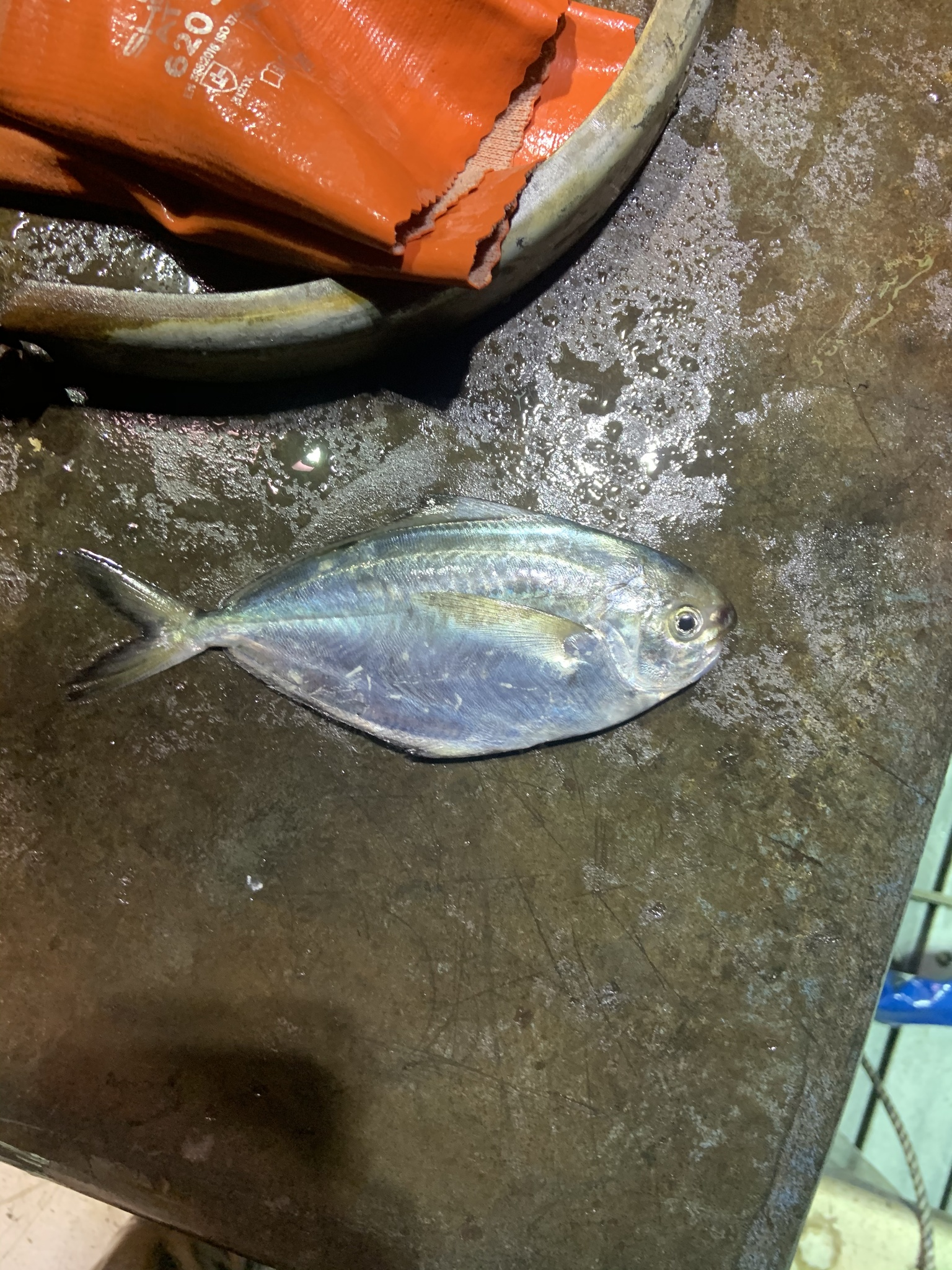
Recently caught fish

Pacific pompanos feed primarily on small invertebrates like crabs, shrimp, and plankton like copepods. Adults may eat slightly larger prey, like larger crabs, clams and mussels, small larval fish, and even small jellyfish. Still, as this is a small species of fish, they are mostly restricted to generally small prey.

== Relationship to humans ==
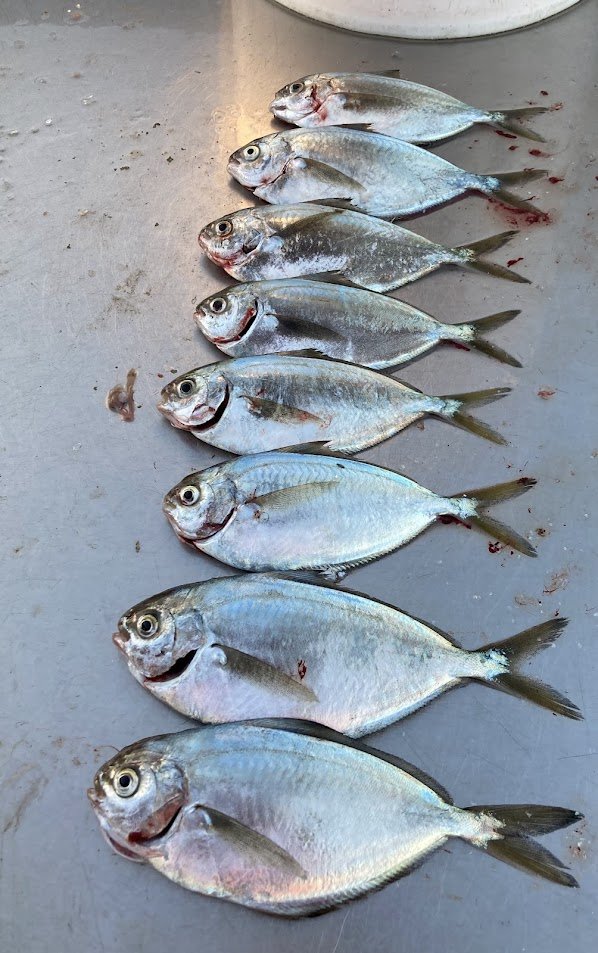
Multiple recently prepared Pacific Pompano caught at Pacifica Pier, CA

The Pacific pompano of considerable importance for commercial fisheries, although it is often caught as bycatch. It is rarely caught by shore anglers, but can be a common catch from Southern California piers. It is revered for its taste and flaky white flesh, and has been considered one of the best eating fishes from the California coast.
