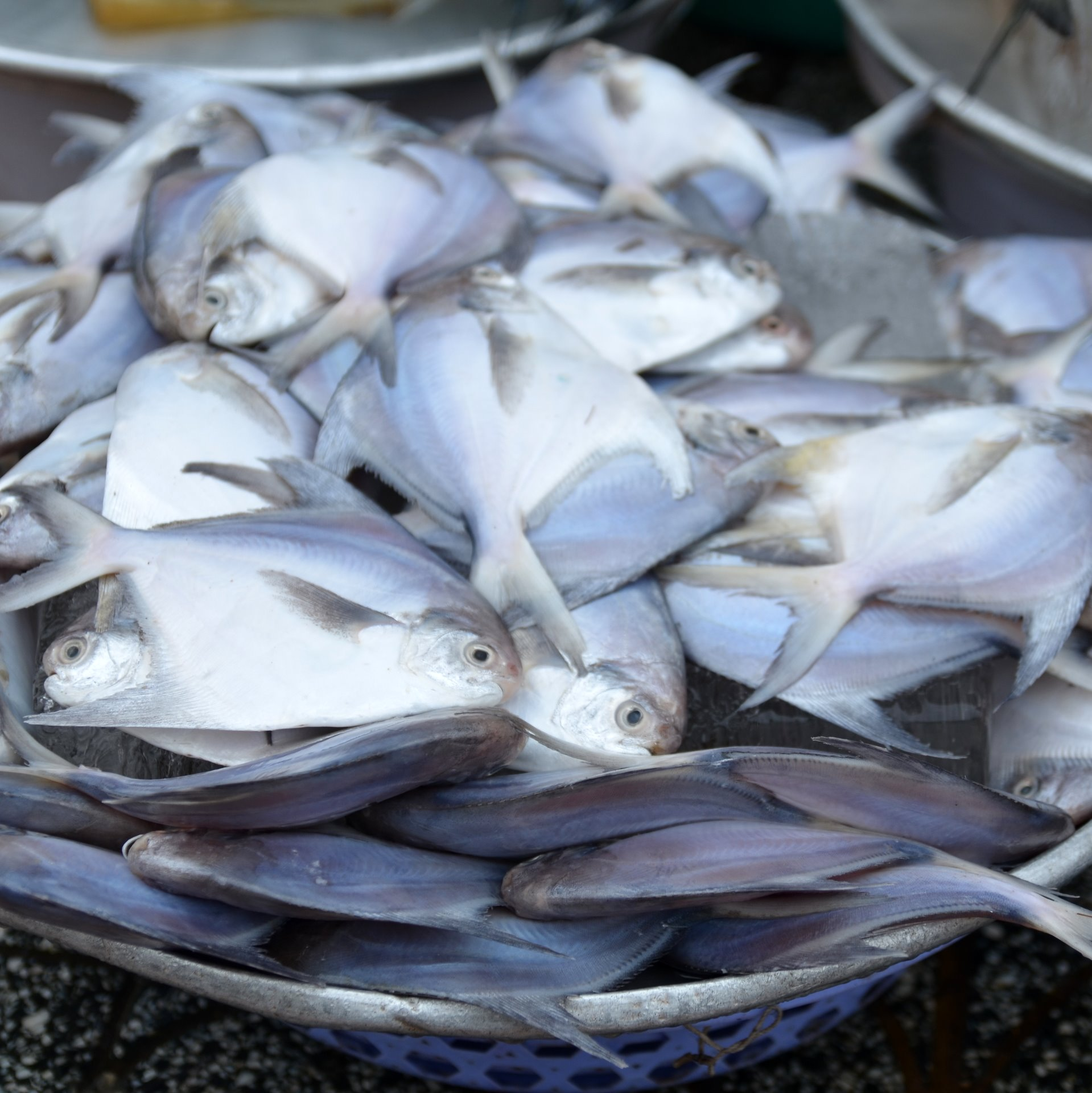
- Pampus argenteus

Scientific classification
- Kingdom: Animalia
- Phylum: Chordata
- Class: Actinopterygii
- Division: Teleostei
- Order: Scombriformes
- Family: Stromateidae
- Genus: Pampus; Bonaparte, 1834

Type species
- Pampus candidus Cuvier, 1829

Synonyms
- Chondroplites Gill, 1862; Leptolepis Guichenot, 1867; Stromateoides Bleeker, 1851

= Pampus (fish) =

Genus of ray-finned fishes

Pampus is a genus of ray-finned fish of the family Stromateidae. They are an important food fish in East and Southeast Asia. In common parlance they are often called pomfrets, although scientifically the term pomfret properly refers to fish of the genus Bramidae. An alternative name for "pomfrets" of the Pampus genus is "pompano".

== Species ==
There are currently nine valid species:

- Pampus argenteus (Euphrasén, 1788) (Silver pomfret)
- Pampus candidus (Cuvier, 1829)
- Pampus chinensis Euphrasén, 1788 (Chinese silver pomfret)
- Pampus cinereus (Bloch, 1795) (Grey pomfret)
- Pampus griseus (Cuvier, 1833)
- Pampus liuorum J. Liu & C. S. Li, 2013 (Liu's pomfret)
- Pampus minor J. Liu & C. S. Li, 1998 (Southern lesser pomfret)
- Pampus nozawae (Ishikawa, 1904)
- Pampus punctatissimus Temminck & Schlegel, 1845
