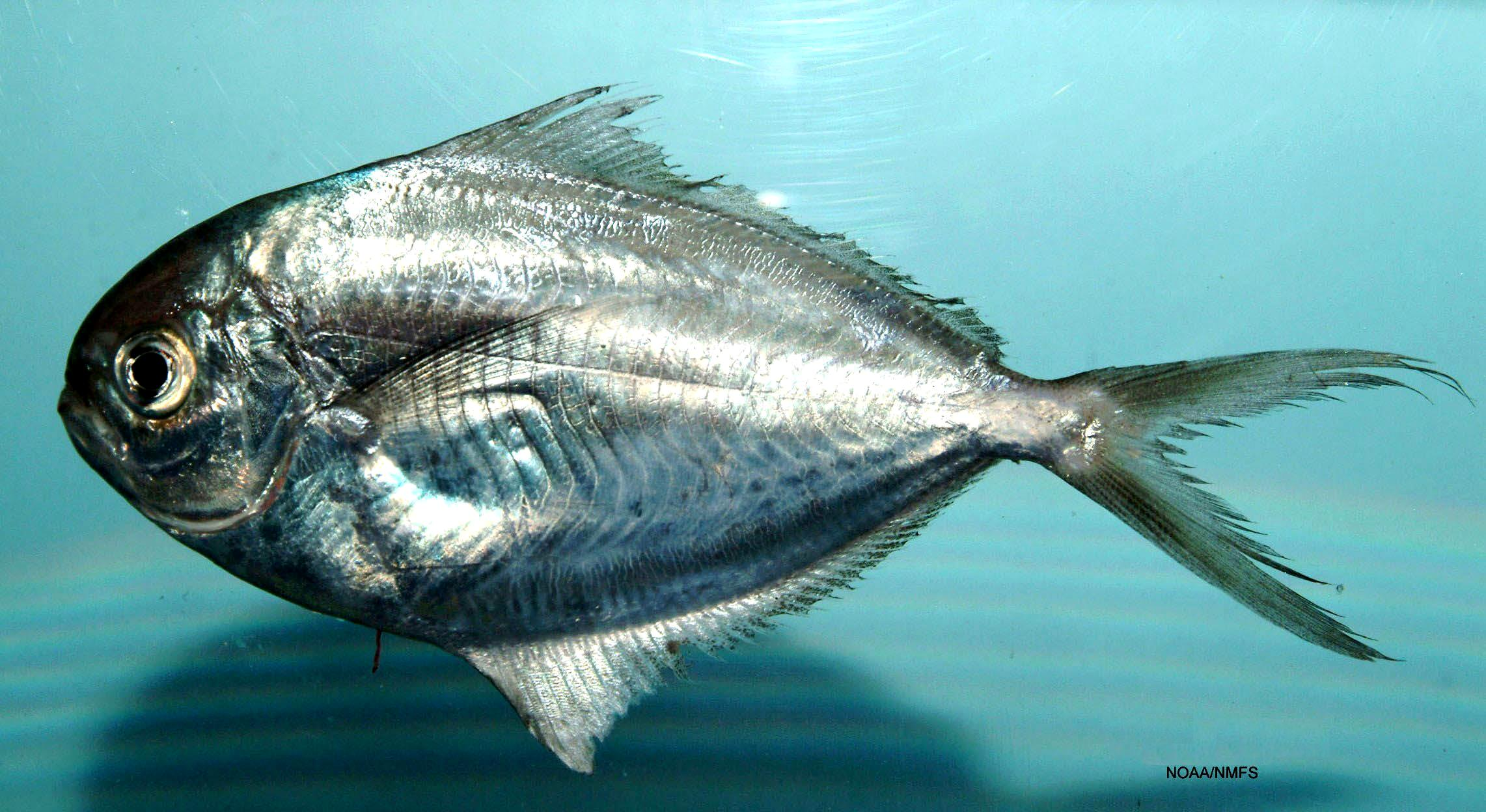

Conservation status
- Least Concern (IUCN 3.1)

Scientific classification
- Kingdom: Animalia
- Phylum: Chordata
- Class: Actinopterygii
- Order: Scombriformes
- Family: Stromateidae
- Genus: Peprilus
- Species: P. burti

Binomial name
- Peprilus burti Fowler, 1944

= Gulf butterfish =

Species of fish

The Gulf butterfish (Peprilus burti) is a fish species of the family Stromateidae found in the Gulf of Mexico and off the coast of the Eastern United States. It has a deep, compressed body with long fins and a forked tail. They are commercially important as food and are listed as Least Concern by the IUCN.

== Description ==
This species is distinguished by the following characters: oval body, deep (its depth less than 2.5 times in total length) and strongly compressed; eyes surrounded by a small area of adipose tissue; short and blunt snout, lower jaw projecting somewhat beyond upper; small mouth, tip of maxillary not reaching below eye margin; very small teeth in jaws, in one row while those in the upper jaw flattened and with three tiny cusps; very long dorsal and anal fin bases (about equal in length), elevated anterior fin rays, but fins not falcate, and both fins preceded by three short, weak, spines; deeply forked caudal fin; long pectoral fins (longer than head) and pointed; absent pelvic fins; distinct series of 17 to 25 pores along anterior half of body under the dorsal fin; high lateral line, following dorsal profile; small scales, present also on cheeks; caudal vertebrae 16 to 18; pale blue body color above, silvery below (fading after death), no spots.

== Diet ==
Adults feed on jellyfish, small fish, crustaceans, and worms; the juveniles are plankton and jellyfish feeders.

== Habitat ==
Gulf butterfish form large loose schools across the continental shelf over sand/mud bottoms; depth ranges from 2 to 275 m at least, but are most abundant at 155 to 225 m. They are found near the bottom during the day, and migrate into the water column at night. Juveniles are often found under floating weeds and with jellyfish.

== Reproduction and life cycle ==
Gulf butterfish mature within one year and rarely live past two years; spawning takes place at discrete intervals twice a year slightly offshore.

== Distribution ==
The Gulf butterfish inhabits the Western Atlantic Ocean, including the entire Gulf of Mexico from the Tampa region in Florida, USA to Yucatan in Mexico. It also occurs on the eastern seaboard from Virginia to northeastern Florida, USA.

== Importance to humans ==
The Gulf butterfish is highly esteemed for food. It is marketed fresh or frozen, and caught mainly with otter trawls.
