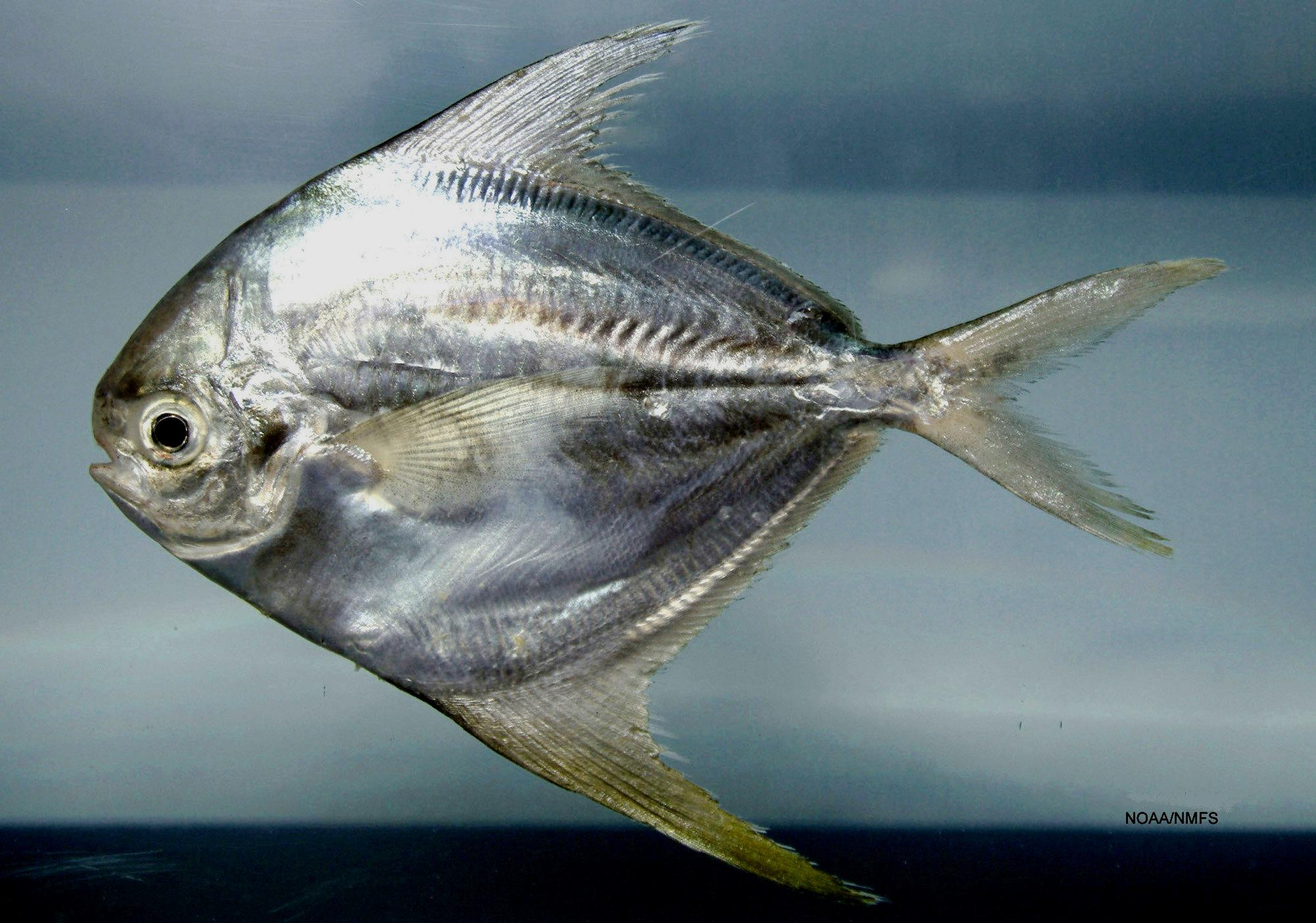
- Peprilus paru

Scientific classification
- Kingdom: Animalia
- Phylum: Chordata
- Class: Actinopterygii
- Order: Scombriformes
- Family: Stromateidae
- Genus: Peprilus; G. Cuvier, 1829

Type species
- Stromateus longipinnis Mitchill, 1815

Synonyms
- Palometa Jordan & Evermann 1896; Poronotus Gill, 1861; Simobrama Fowler, 1944

= Peprilus =

Genus of ray-finned fishes

Peprilus is a genus of ray-finned fish in the family Stromateidae found in Pacific and Atlantic Oceans.

== Species ==
There are currently 9 recognized species in this genus:

- Peprilus burti Fowler, 1944 (Gulf butterfish)
- Peprilus crenulatus G. Cuvier, 1829
- Peprilus medius (W. K. H. Peters, 1869) (Pacific harvestfish)
- Peprilus ovatus Horn, 1970 (Shining butterfish)
- Peprilus paru (Linnaeus, 1758) (American harvestfish)
- Peprilus simillimus (Ayres, 1860) (Pacific pompano)
- Peprilus snyderi C. H. Gilbert & Starks, 1904 (Salema butterfish)
- Peprilus triacanthus (W. Peck, 1804) (Atlantic butterfish)
- Peprilus xanthurus (Quoy & Gaimard, 1825)
