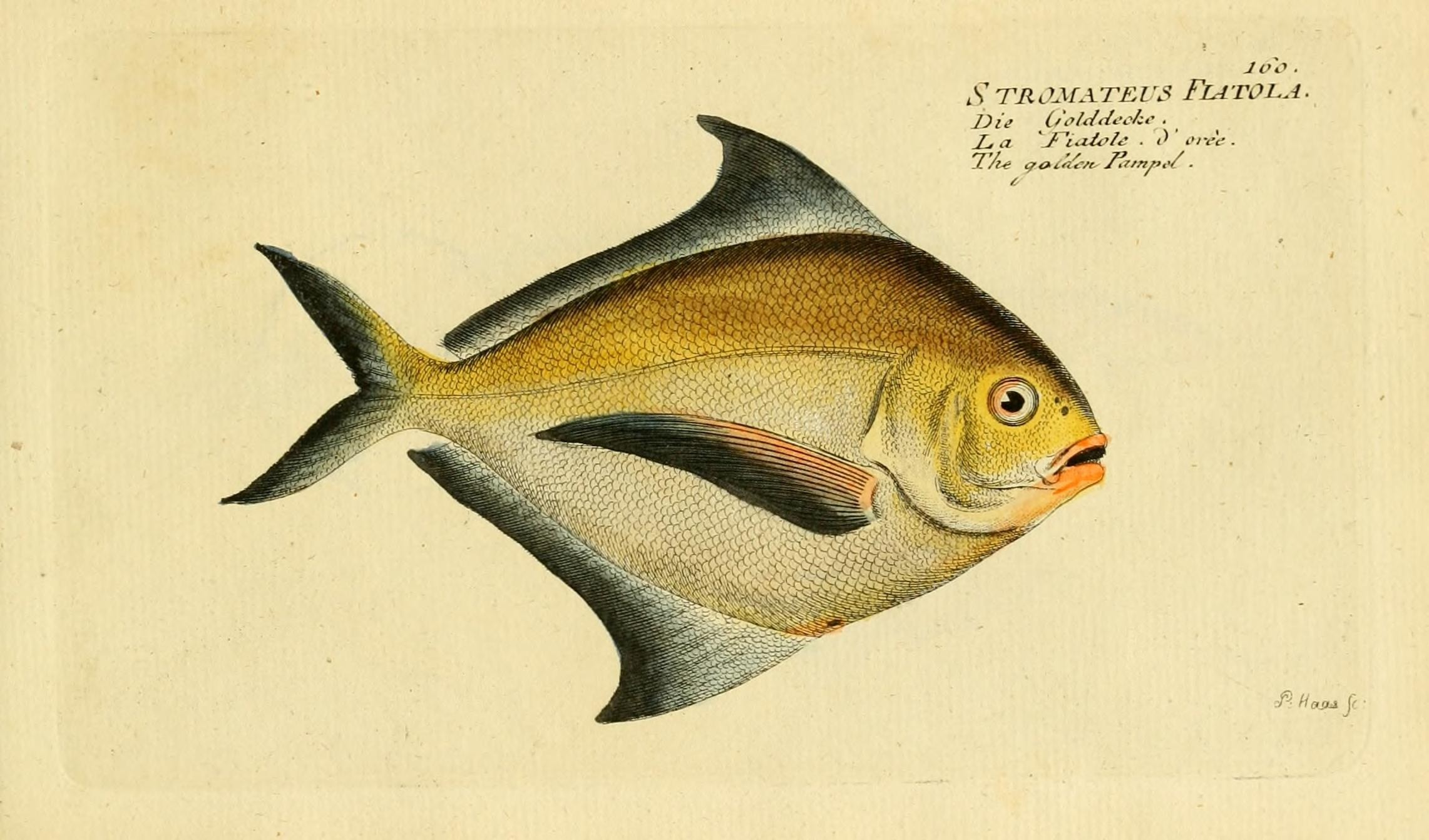
- Stromateus fiatola

Scientific classification
- Kingdom: Animalia
- Phylum: Chordata
- Class: Actinopterygii
- Division: Teleostei
- Order: Scombriformes
- Family: Stromateidae
- Genus: Stromateus; Linnaeus, 1758

Type species
- Stromateus fiatola Linnaeus, 1758

Synonyms
- Chrysostromus Lacépède, 1802; Fiatola Cuvier, 1816; Lepterus Rafinesque, 1810; Pterorhombus Fowler, 1906; Seserinus Oken, 1817

= Stromateus =

Stromateus Temporal range: 55.5–0 Ma

Genus of ray-finned fishes

Stromateus is a genus of ray-finned fish from the butterfish family Stromateidae, of which it is the type genus.

== Species ==
There are three species within the genus Stromateus:

- Stromateus brasiliensis Fowler, 1906 (Southwest Atlantic butterfish)
- Stromateus fiatola Linnaeus, 1758 (blue butterfish)
- Stromateus stellatus Cuvier, 1829 (starry butterfish)
