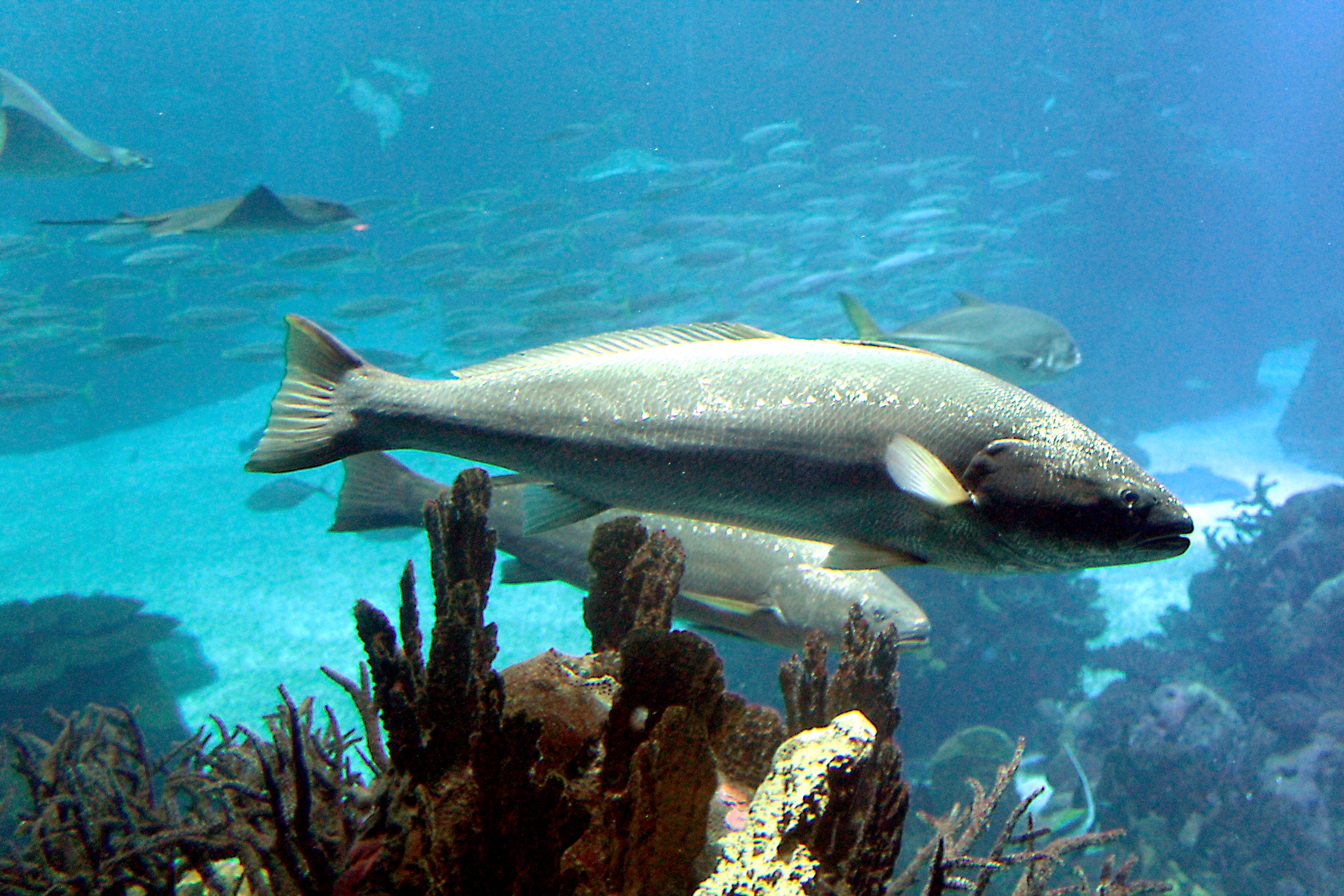

Conservation status
- Least Concern (IUCN 3.1)

Scientific classification
- Kingdom: Animalia
- Phylum: Chordata
- Class: Actinopterygii
- Order: Acanthuriformes
- Family: Sciaenidae
- Genus: Argyrosomus
- Species: A. regius

Binomial name
- Argyrosomus regius Asso, 1801

Synonyms
- List: Sciaena aquila Cuvier, 1817; Perca regia Asso, 1801; Argyrosomus regium (Asso, 1801); Sciaena regius (Asso, 1801); Cheilodipterus aquila Lacepède, 1803; Sciaena aquila (Lacepède, 1803); Perca vanloo Risso, 1810; Argyrosomus procerus De la Pylaie, 1835; Sciaena umbra (non Linnaeus, 1758); Johnius hololepidotus (non Lacepède, 1801)

= Argyrosomus regius =

Species of fish

Argyrosomus regius, also known as the meagre, croaker, jewfish, shade-fish, sowa, kir, corvina, salmon-bass or stone bass, is a species of fish of the family Sciaenidae. This large fish has a pearly-silver to brownish coloration and a yellow-coloured mouth. It is native to the eastern Atlantic Ocean, as well as the Mediterranean and Black Seas.

== Taxonomy ==
Argyrosomus regius was first formally described in 1801 as Perca regia by the Spanish diplomat, naturalist, lawyer and historian Ignacio Jordán Claudio de Asso y del Rio with the type locality given as La Rochelle in Charente-Maritime on the Bay of Biscay coast of France. The specific name regius means "royal". This was not explained by Asso but may be a Latinisation of the Catalan name for this species, reix.

== Description ==
Argyrosomus regius has a relatively large head with quite small eyes, the large mouth is at the terminal position and it has an elongated body. The lateral line is easily seen and extends all the way to the caudal fin. The rear dorsal fin is much longer than first one which has nine rays. The first ray of the anal fin is short and spiny while the second is very thin. The swim bladder contains several branched appendages which are vibrated to make a grunting sound which can be heard from up to 30m away and this grunting is produced by the males during the spawning season. The body colour is pearly-silver, with bronze traits dorsally. The fin bases are reddish brown and mouth cavity yellow-gold or salmon pink. The scales are large and every fourth scale is set at a different angle from the rest. It can reach up to 2.3 m (7.5 ft) in total length and 103 kg (227 lb) in weight.

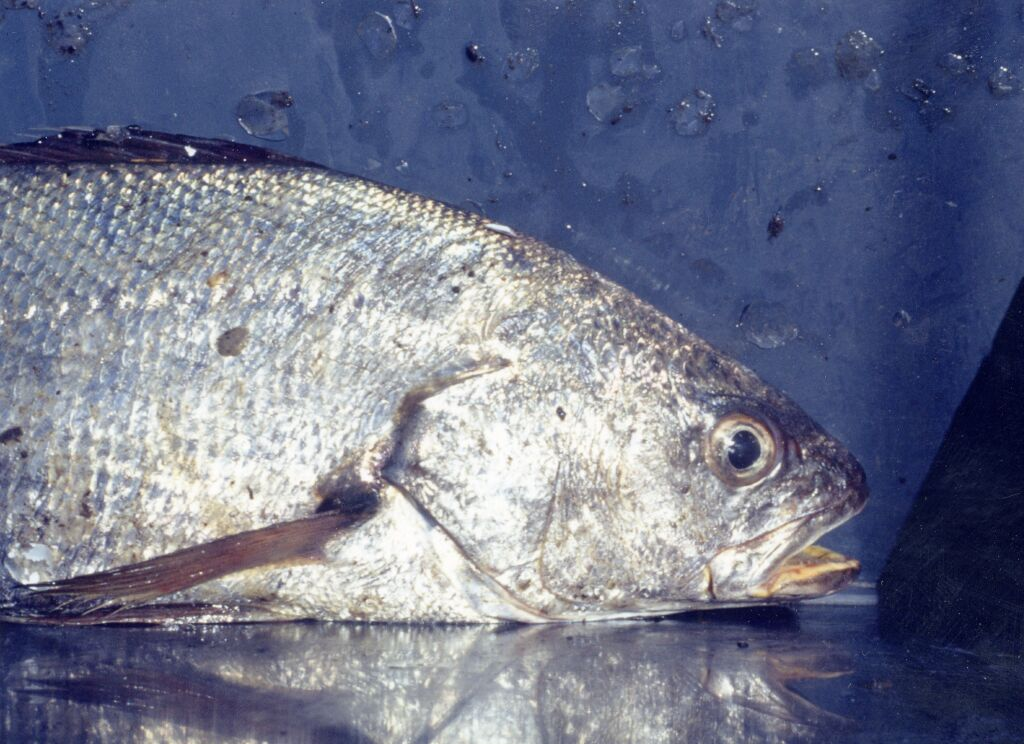

== Distribution ==
Argyrosomus regius is found in the eastern Atlantic from Norway to DR Congo, including the Mediterranean Sea and the Black Sea. It has colonised the Red Sea by migrating through the Suez Canal, an anti-Lessepsian migration. It is rare in the relatively cold, far north of its range, including off the British Isles (three records) and Scandinavia.

== Behaviour and life history ==
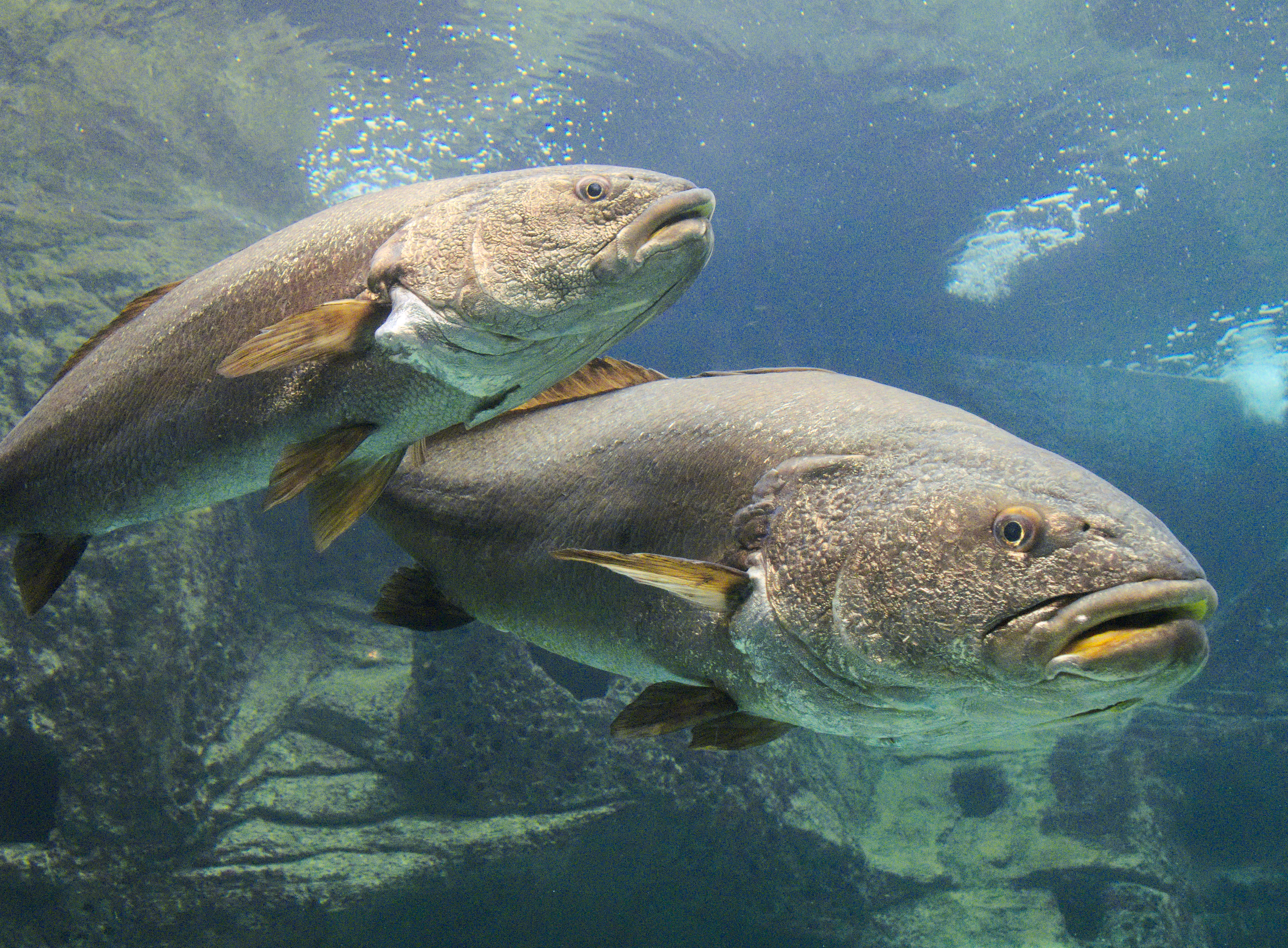
Two individuals at Cretaquarium in Greece

Argyrosomus regius is a demersal, oceanodromous fish which is found in inshore waters and on the continental shelf, it can occur close to the bottom as well as in surface and mid-waters. The adults prey on grey mullet and clupeids such as sardines which are actively pursued in open water. The adults gather in inshore waters to spawn during spring and summer. The juveniles and subadults prefer estuaries and coastal lagoons, and the health of recruitment into the adult population is possibly determined by the availability of these habitats. These fish are migratory, at all ages, migrating along shore or between offshore and inshore waters in response to temperature changes. A. regius feeds on fishes and swimming crustaceans and mostly occurs over sand, close to rocks, at depths of 1–200 m (3.3–656.2 ft), but commonly found at 15–100 m (49–328 ft). The three main spawning sites in the North Atlantic and Mediterranean Sea are the Nile Delta, Lévrier Bay, and the Gironde estuary and with large numbers of adults congregate at these sites between May and July. Large schools of A. regius occur around wrecked ships that were deliberately sunk to create new habitat for a number of commercially caught species of fish. Most of their growth happens during the summer months and feeding activity is significantly reduced when the water temperature drops below 13–15 °C (55–59 °F).

The newly hatched juveniles leave the estuaries where they spend the first few months at the end of summer and move into coastal waters with depths between 20 and 40 m (66–131 ft) where they spend the winter months. In the following spring they return to their estuarine feeding areas from the middle of May. Water temperature is the most important factor that determines the trophic migration and reproduction of meagre. An adult female A. regius measuring 1.2 m (3.9 ft) in length produces about 800,000 eggs and spawning occurs when the water temperature is 17–22 °C (63–72 °F). The juveniles eat small demersal fish and crustaceans switching to pelagic fish and cephalopods once they grow to 30–40 cm in length.

== Fisheries ==
Argyrosomus regius is fished commercially using trawls, long lines, and hand lines. It is also a sport fishing quarry species. Specimens of 1.8 m in length and over 50 kg in weight which were landed in Portugal in 2002 fetched over €200. The main meagre fisheries are currently in Mauritania, Morocco, and Egypt and these account for over 80% of the annual world catch of around 10,000 tonnes. The European fisheries are comparatively small and are on the Atlantic coasts of Spain, Portugal and France with annual catches of 800 t in France, 400 t in Portugal and 150 t in Spain.

== Aquaculture ==
The farming of Argyrosomus regius is still rather experimental and involves intensive production, in land-based tanks and sea cages. There are few facilities established mainly in southern France where they are in the Camargue, Cannes, and Corsica, in Huelva, Spain, and at La Spezia and Laguna di Orbetello in Italy. It is also produced in large quantities in Turkey. Fao Report on Meagre Farming
