= Salariopsis atlantica =

Moroccan Freshwater Blenny

Conservation status
- Endangered (IUCN 3.1)

Scientific classification
- Kingdom: Animalia
- Phylum: Chordata
- Class: Actinopterygii
- Order: Blenniiformes
- Family: Blenniidae
- Genus: Salariopsis
- Species: S. atlantica

Binomial name
- Salariopsis atlantica Doadrio, Perea & Yahyaoui, 2011

Synonyms
- Salaria atlantica

Species of fish

Salariopsis atlantica is a species of combtooth blenny from the subfamily Salarinae, the largest of the two subfamilies in the Family Blenniidae. It is a freshwater species which is restricted to Ouerrha River which is part of the Sebou River basin, in Morocco. It is found in shallow, flowing streams with a stony substrate.
