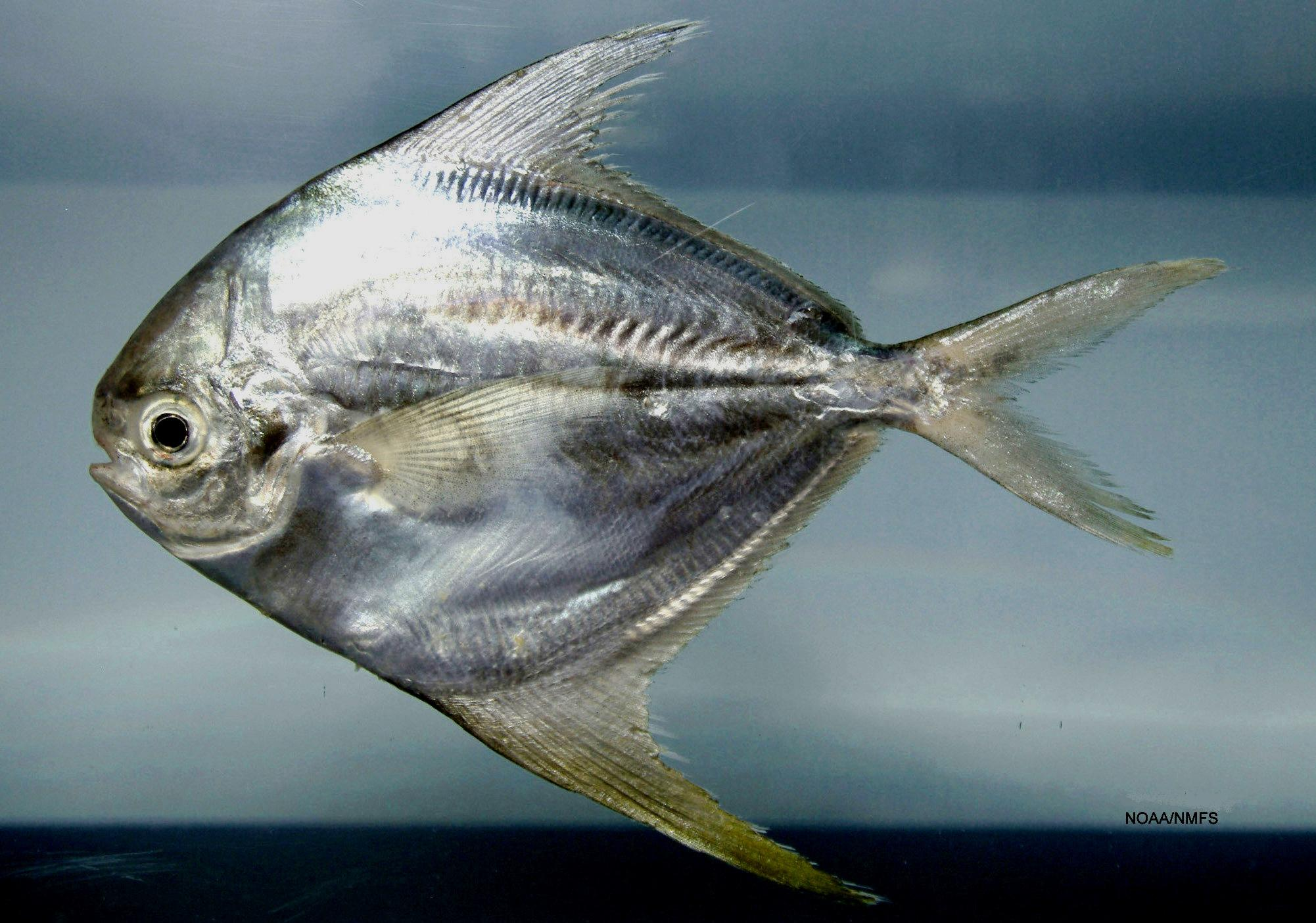
- Peprilus paru

Scientific classification
- Domain: Eukaryota
- Kingdom: Animalia
- Phylum: Chordata
- Class: Actinopterygii
- Clade: Percomorpha
- Order: Scombriformes
- Suborder: Stromateoidei
- Family: Stromateidae; Rafinesque, 1810

Genera
- Pampus; Peprilus; Stromateus; †Pinichthys; See text for species.

= Stromateidae =

Butterfish Temporal range: Early Oligocene–present

Family of ray-finned fishes

The family Stromateidae or butterfish contains 15 species of ray-finned fish in three genera. Butterfishes live in coastal waters off the Americas, western Africa and in the Indo-Pacific.

The endemic New Zealand species Odax pullus is commonly called butterfish, but is from a separate family Odacidae. The Japanese butterfish Psenopsis anomala is from the separate family Centrolophidae. The African butter catfish is also known as the butter fish. In South Australia, the Argyrosomus japonicus is commonly called butterfish as well.

== Species ==
- Genus Pampus
  - Silver or white pomfret, Pampus argenteus (Euphrasen, 1788); Synonym: P. cinereus (Bloch, 1795).
  - Chinese silver pomfret, Pampus chinensis (Euphrasen, 1788):
  - Pampus echinogaster (Basilewsky, 1855).
  - Southern lesser pomfret, Pampus minor Liu & Li, 1998.
  - Pampus punctatissimus (Temminck & Schlegel, 1845).
- Genus Peprilus
  - Gulf butterfish, Peprilus burti Fowler, 1944.
  - Pacific harvestfish, Peprilus medius (Peters, 1869).
  - Shining butterfish, Peprilus ovatus Horn, 1970.
  - Harvestfish (American harvestfish) Peprilus paru (Linnaeus, 1758).
  - Pacific pompano, Peprilus simillimus (Ayres, 1860).
  - Salema butterfish, Peprilus snyderi Gilbert & Starks, 1904.
  - Atlantic butterfish (aka American butterfish), Peprilus triacanthus (Peck, 1804).
- Genus Stromateus
  - Southwest Atlantic butterfish, Stromateus brasiliensis Fowler, 1906.
  - Blue butterfish, Stromateus fiatola Linnaeus, 1758.
  - Starry butterfish, Stromateus stellatus Cuvier, 1829.

=== Fossil species ===
- †Pinichthys Bannikov, 1985
  - †P. fractus Bannikov, 1985
  - †P. pulcher Bannikov, 1988
  - †P. shirvanensis Bannikov, 2021

The only known fossil butterfish is Pinichthys from the Early Oligocene to Miocene of Germany, Poland, Ukraine, North Caucasus (Russia) and Azerbaijan. It may potentially be the common ancestor of all extant butterfish genera.

== Mislabelling ==
Escolar is sometimes fraudulently labelled as butterfish. This can be more hazardous than other fish mislabeling due to the potential health effects of escolar.
