= Trichonis blenny =

Conservation status
- Endangered (IUCN 3.1)

Scientific classification
- Kingdom: Animalia
- Phylum: Chordata
- Class: Actinopterygii
- Order: Blenniiformes
- Family: Blenniidae
- Genus: Salariopsis
- Species: S. economidisi

Binomial name
- Salariopsis economidisi Kottelat, 2004

Synonyms
- Salaria economidisi

Species of fish

Trichonis blenny, Salariopsis economidisi, is a species of fish in the family Blenniidae. It is endemic to Greece. It is only found in Lake Trichonis where it is threatened by habitat loss. This species reaches a length of 6.5 centimetres (2.6 in) SL.
