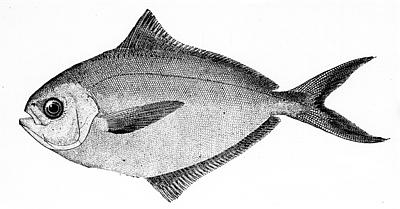

Scientific classification
- Domain: Eukaryota
- Kingdom: Animalia
- Phylum: Chordata
- Class: Actinopterygii
- Order: Scombriformes
- Family: Stromateidae
- Genus: Peprilus
- Species: P. triacanthus

Binomial name
- Peprilus triacanthus (Peck, 1804)

Synonyms
- Poronotus triacanthus (Peck, 1804); Rhombus triacanthus (Peck, 1804); Stromateus cryptosus Mitchill, 1814; Stromateus triacanthus Peck, 1804

= American butterfish =

Species of fish

The American butterfish (Peprilus triacanthus), also known as the Atlantic butterfish, is a butterfish of the family Stromateidae.

== Description ==
Fish of this species are usually deep-bodied, flattened sideways, and somewhat circular or rounded, with blunt noses and small mouths with weak teeth. Some other characteristics of this fish are the absence of ventral fins, one long, continuous dorsal fin, long pectoral fins, and tiny, cycloid scales. The tail fin is nearly as long as the dorsal fin and deeply forked. The American butterfish is similar in appearance to its close relative, the harvestfish (Peprilus alepidotus), but can be distinguished by its much lower dorsal and tail fin.

This fish is a lead-blue color above with pale sides and a silvery belly. It often has dark, irregular spots.

It is generally 6–9 in (15–23 cm), though some individuals reach 12 in (30 cm). They can weigh from 1.75–20 ounces (50–567 g).

== Distribution and habitat ==
The American butterfish ranges from the Atlantic coast of North America, from the offing of South Carolina and from coastal North Carolina waters to the outer coast of Nova Scotia and Cape Breton; northward as a stray to the Gulf of St. Lawrence, to the south and east coasts of Newfoundland; and southward to Florida in deep water. Relatively little is known about the American butterfish considering it is an important food source and a common species. It travels in small bands or loosely organized schools, preferring sandy-bottomed areas to muddy ones, and often coming close to shore. During summer months, it does not swim deeper than 10 to 15 fathoms (20 to 30 m), but in the winter and early spring, it may be found 100 to 115 fathoms (200 to 230 m) below the surface.

== Feeding ==
It feeds on small fish, crustaceans, and annelids.

== Breeding ==
The American butterfish spawns in the Gulf of Maine during the summer months, peaking in July. It appears to spawn a few miles out to sea and returns to the coast when finished. Incubation lasts less than 48 hours in water at 65 °F (18 °C). Fry are 2 mm (0.079 in) long at hatching, and by autumn, have grown to a length of 3–4 in (7.6–10.2 cm). They appear to reach maturity at about two years of age.
