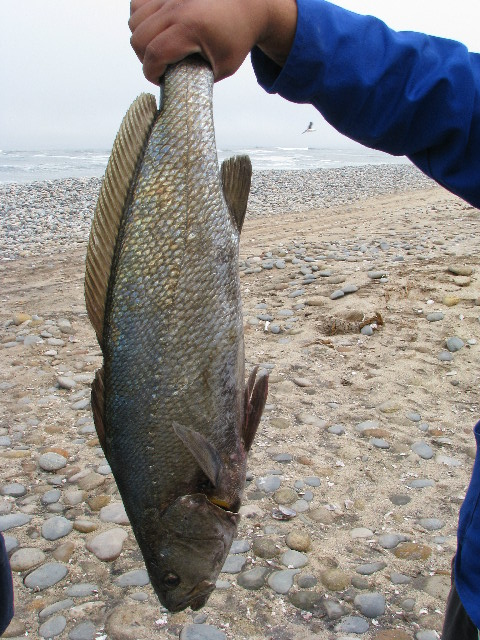

Conservation status
- Data Deficient (IUCN 3.1)

Scientific classification
- Kingdom: Animalia
- Phylum: Chordata
- Class: Actinopterygii
- Order: Acanthuriformes
- Family: Sciaenidae
- Genus: Argyrosomus
- Species: A. coronus

Binomial name
- Argyrosomus coronus Griffiths & Heemstra, 1995
- native range, IUCN 2018 data

= Argyrosomus coronus =

Westcoast dusky cob

Species of fish

Argyrosomus coronus, also known as the westcoast dusky kob, is a species of marine ray-finned fish belonging to the family Sciaenidae, the drums and croakers. It is found on the west coast of Southern Africa, from southern Angola to northern Namibia and part of South Africa.

== Taxonomy ==
Argyrosomus coronus was first formally described by M. H. Griffiths, M.H. and P. C. Heemstra in 1995.

== Distribution and habitat ==
The species has a distribution confined to the Angola–Benguela Frontal Zone (ABFZ) of the southeastern Atlantic Ocean. A study revealed that during a period of local warming, the species extended its distribution into Namibian waters, where it hybridised with the resident and congeneric Argyrosomus inodorus.

Adults migrate in correlation with the movement of the Angola–Benguela frontal zone, travelling northward as far as Gabon in winter and returning to southern Angola in spring, coinciding with what appears to be offshore spawning.
