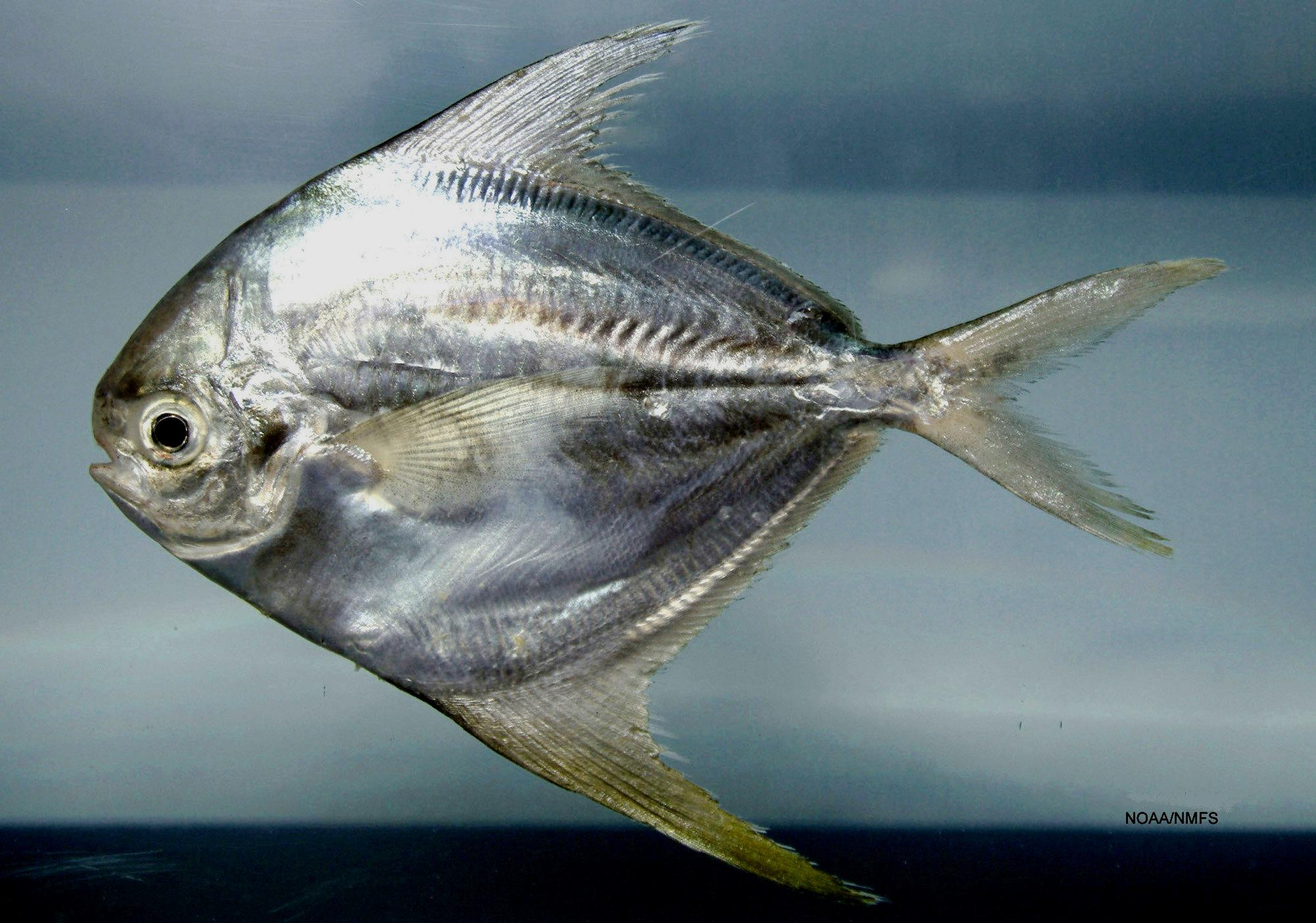
- Specimen from the Gulf of Mexico

Conservation status
- Least Concern (IUCN 3.1)

Scientific classification
- Kingdom: Animalia
- Phylum: Chordata
- Class: Actinopterygii
- Division: Teleostei
- Order: Scombriformes
- Family: Stromateidae
- Genus: Peprilus
- Species: P. paru

Binomial name
- Peprilus paru (Linnaeus, 1758)

Synonyms
- Stromateus paru Linnaeus, 1758; Chaetodon alepidotus Linnaeus, 1766; Peprilus alepidotus (Linnaeus, 1766); Rhombus alepidotus (Linnaeus, 1766); Sternoptyx gardenii Bloch & Schneider, 1801; Stromateus gardenii (Bloch & Schneider, 1801); Stromateus longipinnis Mitchill, 1815; Peprilus longipinnis (Mitchill, 1815)

= Peprilus paru =

Species of fish

Peprilus paru, (harvestfish or American harvestfish; syn. Peprilus alepidotus), also occasionally known by a few local names as star butter fish or sometimes even simply as butterfish, is a marine, benthopelagic, circular-shaped and deep-bodied fish classified in the family Stromateidae of butterfishes.

These fish grow usually to about 20 centimetres (7.9 in) in length, and are deep-bodied and circular-shaped, with curved fins, rounded nose and small mouth. Harvestfish are greenish silvery above, silvery sometimes tinged with yellow on its sides and belly and the fins of some individuals are slightly dusky or yellowish. Their habitat is the subtropical waters of the Western Atlantic: Chesapeake Bay and northern Gulf of Mexico in United States to Argentina. Harvestfish are sometimes caught commercially as a food fish.

== Description ==
The harvestfish is deep-bodied, round, and strongly compressed laterally with a forked caudal fin. It has long, curved, sickle-shaped dorsal and anal fins, lacks pelvic fins, a blunt snout, a small mouth, weak teeth, and lack a longitudinal keel. Harvestfish are usually silvery and iridescent, sometimes with a green tint on its dorsal half, with tinged yellow fins. They usually grow to about 18 to 30 centimetres (7.1 to 11.8 in) in length. Harvestfish have 2–5 total dorsal spines, 38–47 total soft dorsal rays, 2–3 anal spines, and 35–45 soft anal rays. The harvestfish also lacks the mucous pores situated below the anterior half of the dorsal fin that are conspicuous in the butterfish.

== Diet ==
Adults are predatory and feed on small fishes, invertebrates such as jellyfish, crustaceans, and worms. Juveniles are plankton feeders.

== Habitat ==
The harvestfish is a pelagic schooling fish found in subtropical waters in coastal bays and inshore waters over the continental shelf at moderate depths. Juveniles can be found in shallow coastal waters or near coastal estuaries. They are known for their habit of swimming under certain species of jellyfishes, where they find shelter and perhaps a food supply of small invertebrates that have become entangled in the tentacles, but they are also subject to fatal stings inflicted by these tentacles.

== Distribution ==
The harvestfish distribution is Western Atlantic, as well as the Northern Gulf of Mexico to Argentina. They can range from Florida to Venezuela, Trinidad, and Antilles. They have been found in the western Caribbean.
