= Ignacio Jordán Claudio de Asso y del Río =

Spanish diplomat, naturalist, lawyer and historian

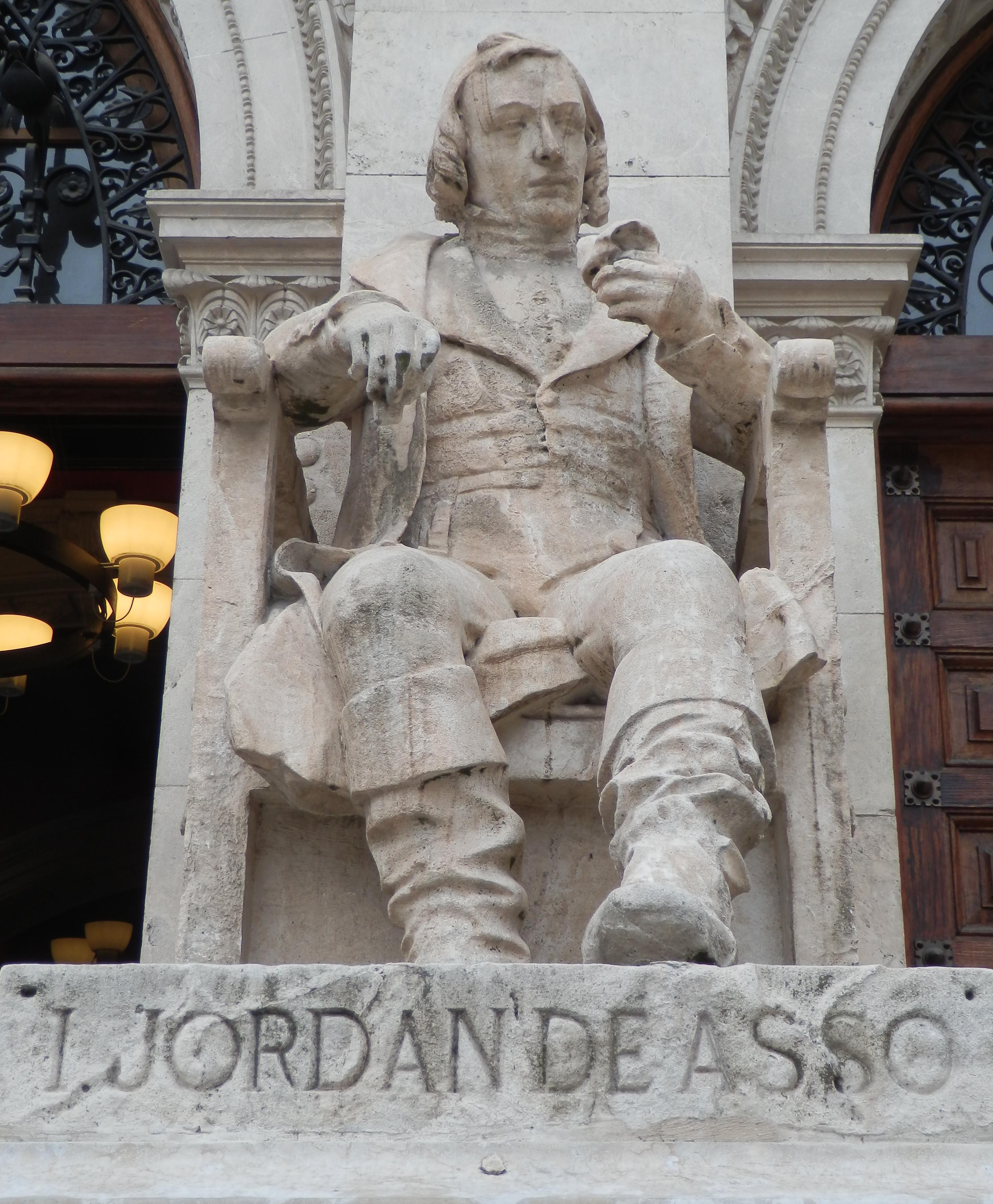
Statue of Jordán de Asso, by Dionisio Lasuén, on the entrance of the old Faculty of Medicine of the University of Saragossa.

Ignacio Jordán Claudio de Asso y del Río (June 4, 1742 – May 21, 1814) was a Spanish diplomat, naturalist, lawyer and historian. He sometimes used the pseudonym of Melchor de Azagra.

== Biography ==
Of noble birth, he received an excellent education, studying Classical Greek and Latin in the college known as the Escuelas Pías of Zaragoza (1755) and philosophy under the Jesuits at the Real e Imperial Colegio de Nobles de Nuestra Señora y Santiago de Cordellas, located in Barcelona (1756). He studied at the University of Cervera, where he graduated with a bachelor of arts in 1760, and at the University of Zaragoza, where he studied jurisprudence, graduating in 1764.

He worked as a jurist from 1765 to 1776 and traveled for three years across Europe and from 1771 to 1775 he published in Madrid, collaboratively and also alone, a massive work on jurisprudence (Instituciones del Derecho Civil de Castilla, 1771; El Fuero Viejo de Castilla, 1771 (with Miguel de Manuel y Rodríguez); El ordenamiento de leyes que D. Alfonso XI hizo en las cortes de Alcalá de Henares el año de mil trescientos y cuarenta y ocho, 1774 (also with Miguel de Manuel y Rodríguez)).

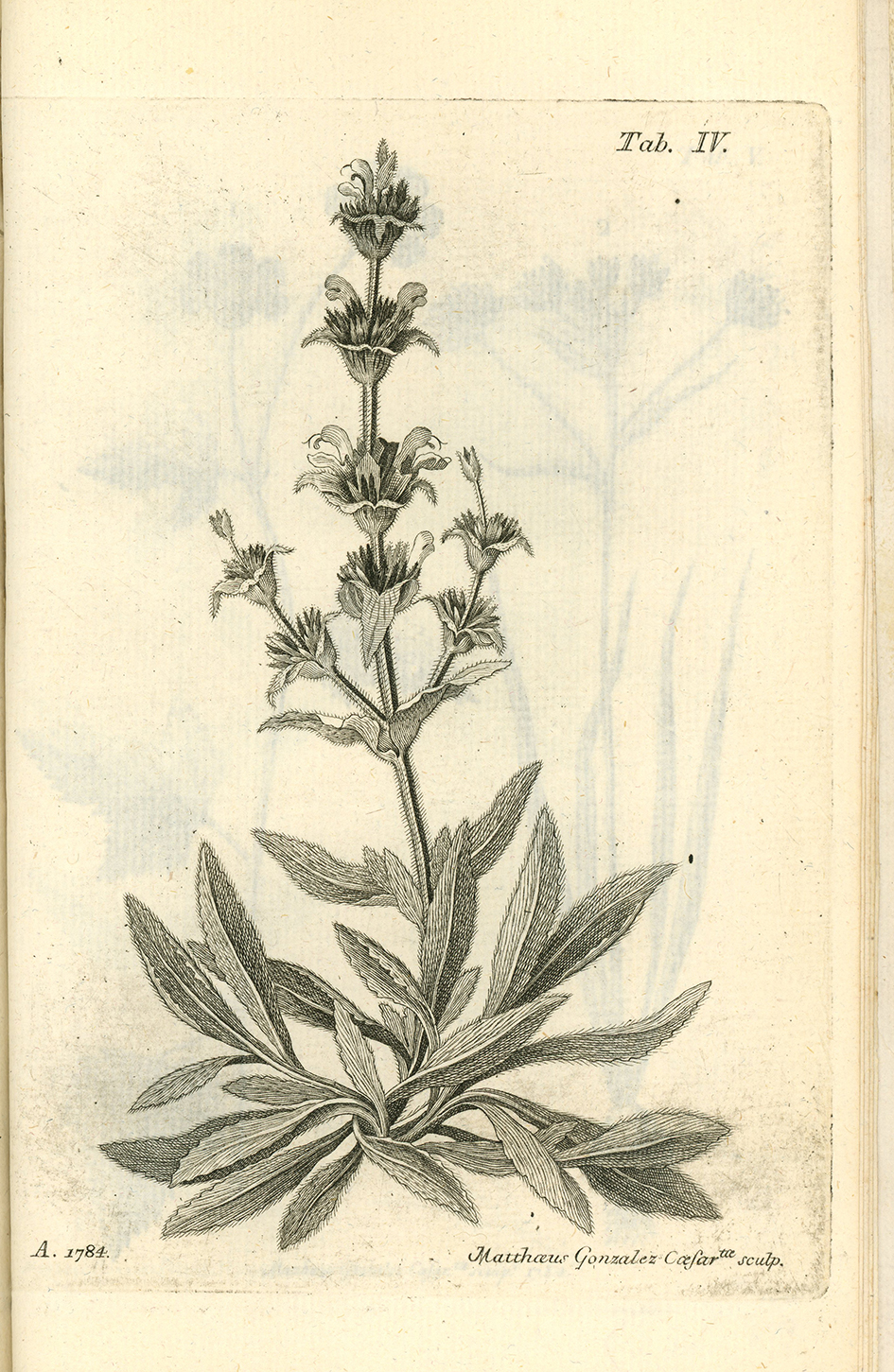
Plate of Salvia phlomonoides Asso in the book Introductio in Oryctographiam, et Zoologiam Aragoniae. Accedit Enumeratio stirpium in eadem Regione noviter detectarum

In 1776, he began work as a diplomat and served as consul at Dunkirk (1776), consul general at Amsterdam (1776–1787) and consul at Bordeaux (1787–1791). While a diplomat, he concerned himself with scientific and economic matters, and published in Amsterdam works on the botany, zoology, and mineralogy of Aragon (Synopsis estirpium indigenarum Aragoniae, 1779; Mantissa stirpium indigenarum Aragoniae, 1781; Introductio in oryctographiam, et zoologiam Aragoniae, 1784; Enumeratio stirpium in Aragonia noviter detectarum, 1784). He described for the first time the fish Argyrosomus regius and Salaria fluviatilis.

He also translated and published the work of various Aragonese writers and poets of the medieval and early modern periods (Bibliotheca Arabico-Aragonensis, 1782; Joannis Sobrarii, Carmina, 1783; Clariorum Aragonensium monumenta in lucem prolata, 1786; Poesías Selectas de Martín Miguel Navarro Canónigo de Tarazona, 1781; Aganipe de los Cisnes Aragoneses Celebrados en el clarín de la fama, 1781).

Afterward, he served as chair of Chemistry and Botany of the Real Sociedad Económica Aragonesa (1797–1802) and published various works on agriculture, botany, natural science, and literature.

During the first and second sieges of Zaragoza, he served as legal advisor to José Rebolledo de Palafox, 1st Duke of Saragossa, and assisted the Spanish resistance against Napoleon by contributing journalistic pieces to the Gazeta extraordinaria de Zaragoza.

After the fall of Zaragoza, he fled to Murviedro and then to Palma de Mallorca. After the end of the French occupation, he was named regidor of Zaragoza in January 1814, but was too old and infirm to occupy the post. He died three months later.
