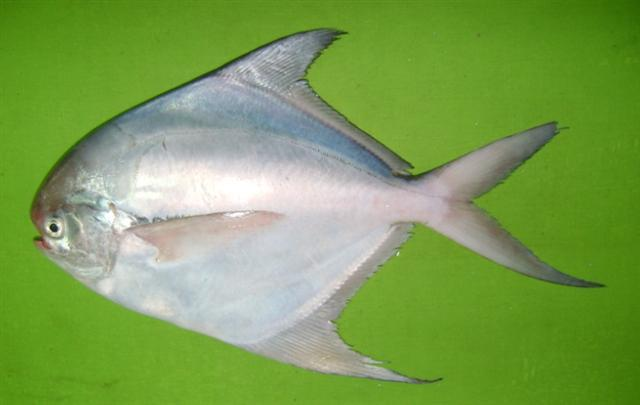

Conservation status
- Vulnerable (IUCN 3.1)

Scientific classification
- Kingdom: Animalia
- Phylum: Chordata
- Class: Actinopterygii
- Division: Teleostei
- Order: Scombriformes
- Family: Stromateidae
- Genus: Pampus
- Species: P. argenteus

Binomial name
- Pampus argenteus (Euphrasén, 1788)

Synonyms
- Stromateus argenteus Euphrasen, 1788; Stromateoides argenteus (Euphrasen, 1788); Stromateus cinereus Bloch, 1795; Pampus cinereus (Bloch, 1795); Stromatioides nozawae Ishikawa, 1904

= Pampus argenteus =

Species of ray-finned fish

Pampus argenteus, the silver pomfret or white pomfret is a species of butterfish that lives in the Indo-West Pacific, spanning the coastal waters of the Middle East, Eastern Africa, South Asia, Southeast Asia, and East Asia. The species has been reported only twice, one hundred years apart, from the central Mediterranean Sea.

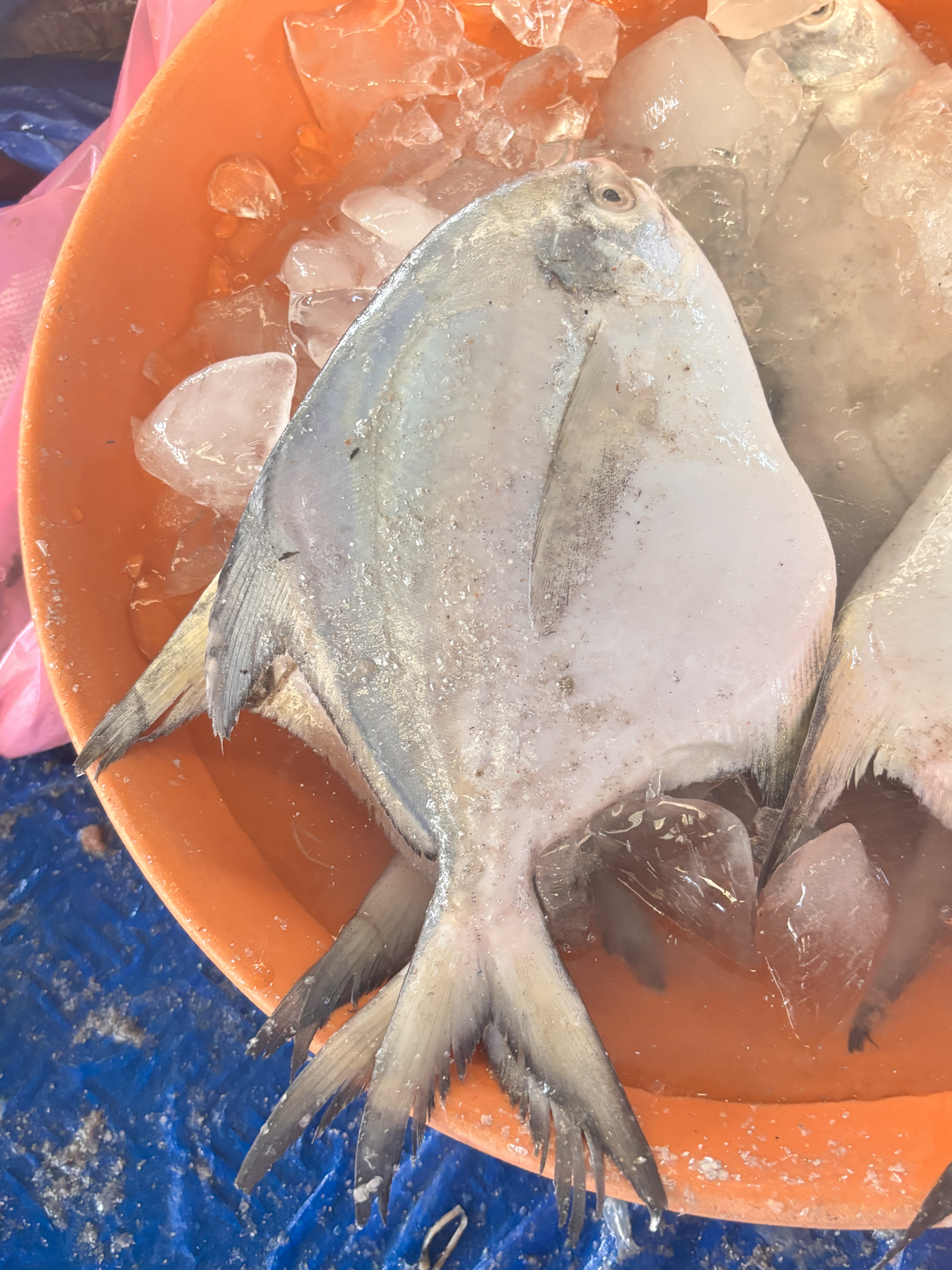
Pampus argenteus in a fish market

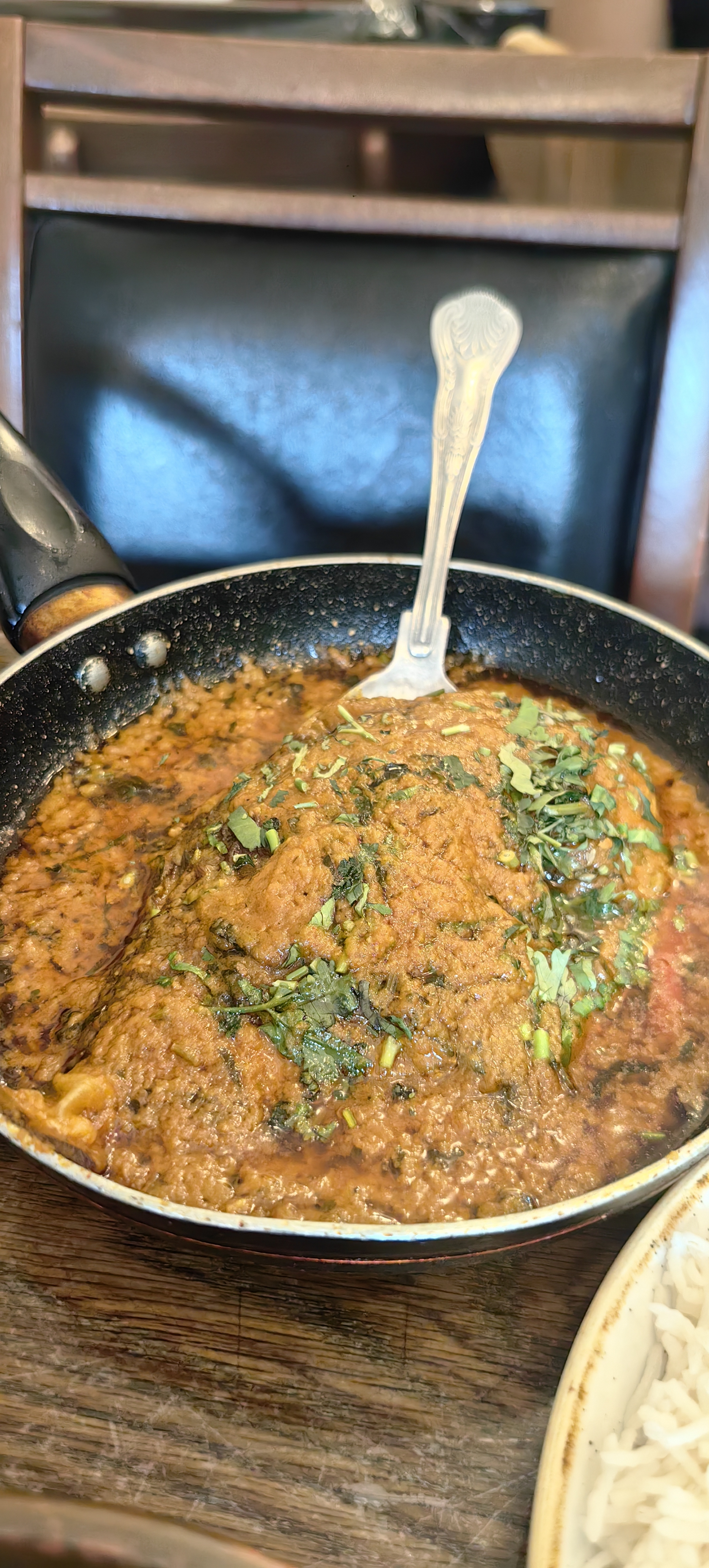
Pomfret prepared in a Bangladeshi Masala

Silver pomfrets are usually silver/white in color, with few small scales. They can grow up to a range of 4–6 kg (8–13 lb). However, due to overfishing, specimens weighing less than 1 kg (2 lb) are more commonly seen.

The silver pomfret should not be mistaken for the Florida pompano (Trachinotus carolinus), which is a jackfish found off the coast of Florida in the Gulf of Mexico, and neither should be confused with true pomfrets, which are of the family Bramidae or chinese pomfrets which may appear similar.

== As food ==
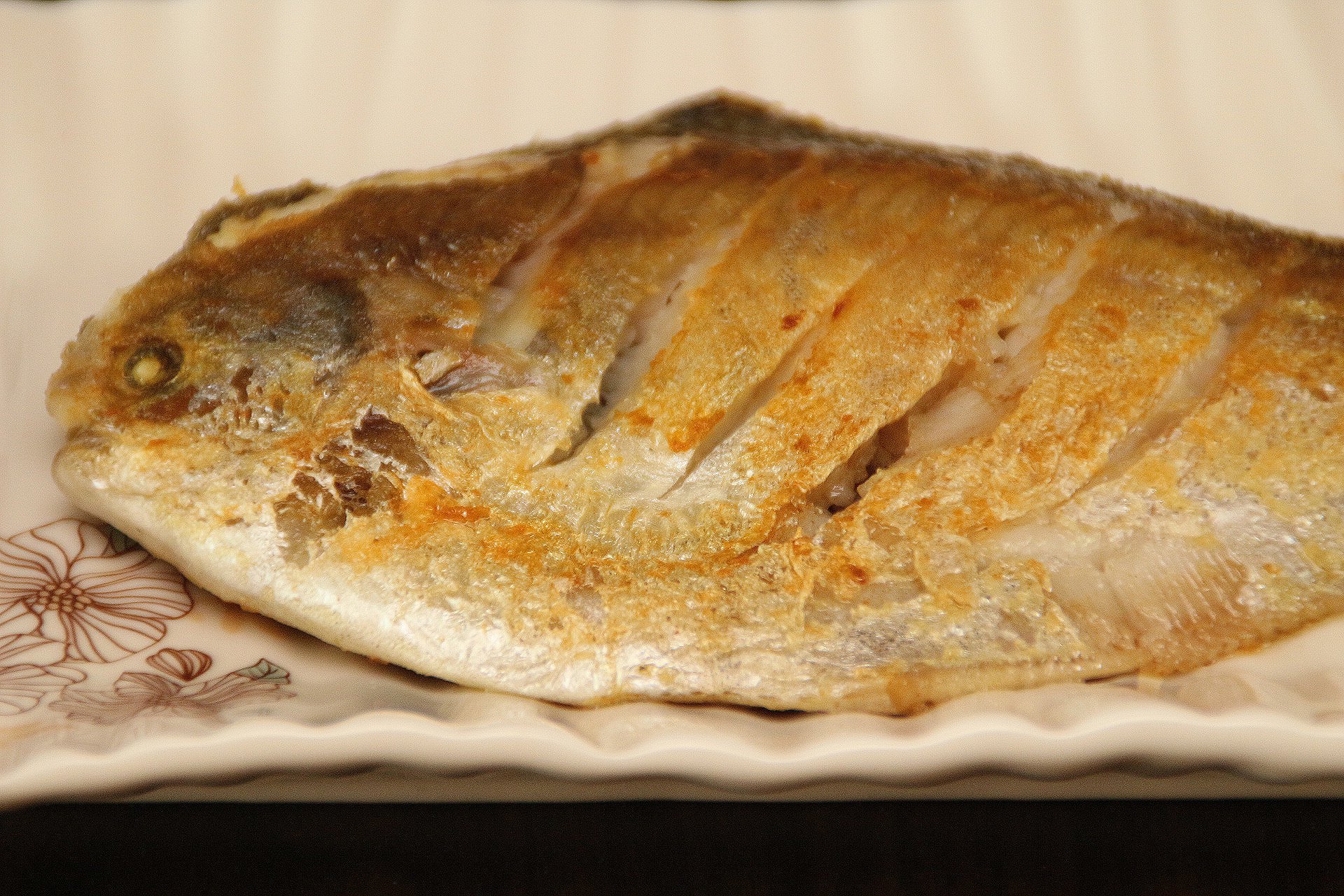
Byeongeo-gui (grilled pomfret)

This fish is prized in the Indo-Asia-Pacific region for its taste. Its flesh is soft and buttery when cooked. It is called "Rupchanda" in Bengali, pamplet in Marathi or Maanji in Mumbai, paaplet (Konkani: पापलेट) in Goa, avoli (Malayalam: ആവോലി) in Kerala and vawall (Tamil: வௌவால்) in parts of South India. It is called zubaidi in Arabic, which is derived from the word zubdah, meaning 'butter', due to its tender flesh. In Indonesia, it is known as bawal putih.

In Korea, the fish is known as byeongeo (병어) and is often grilled into gui and eaten as a banchan (side dish). It is also a popular dish in Chinese cuisine, where it is called yínchāng (銀鯧) and is often served steamed or braised.

Pomfret is especially popular in Kuwait, and it is one of the most expensive types of fish in the market, with the Kuwaiti Pomfret (Gulf Arabic: زبيدي كويتي, romanized: zbēdi kwēti), caught in the waters of Kuwait, being the most sought-after followed by the Iranian Pomfret (Gulf Arabic: زبيدي ايراني, romanized: zbēdi īrāni). The Kuwaiti government regularly bans the fishing of the Kuwaiti type to allow the fish to reproduce. Mtabbag Zbedi (Gulf Arabic: مطبق زبيدي, romanized: mṭabbag zbēdi) is a popular Kuwaiti dish made with fried pomfret, spices, and rice, with daqqūs, Kuwaiti home-made hot sauce, usually added.
