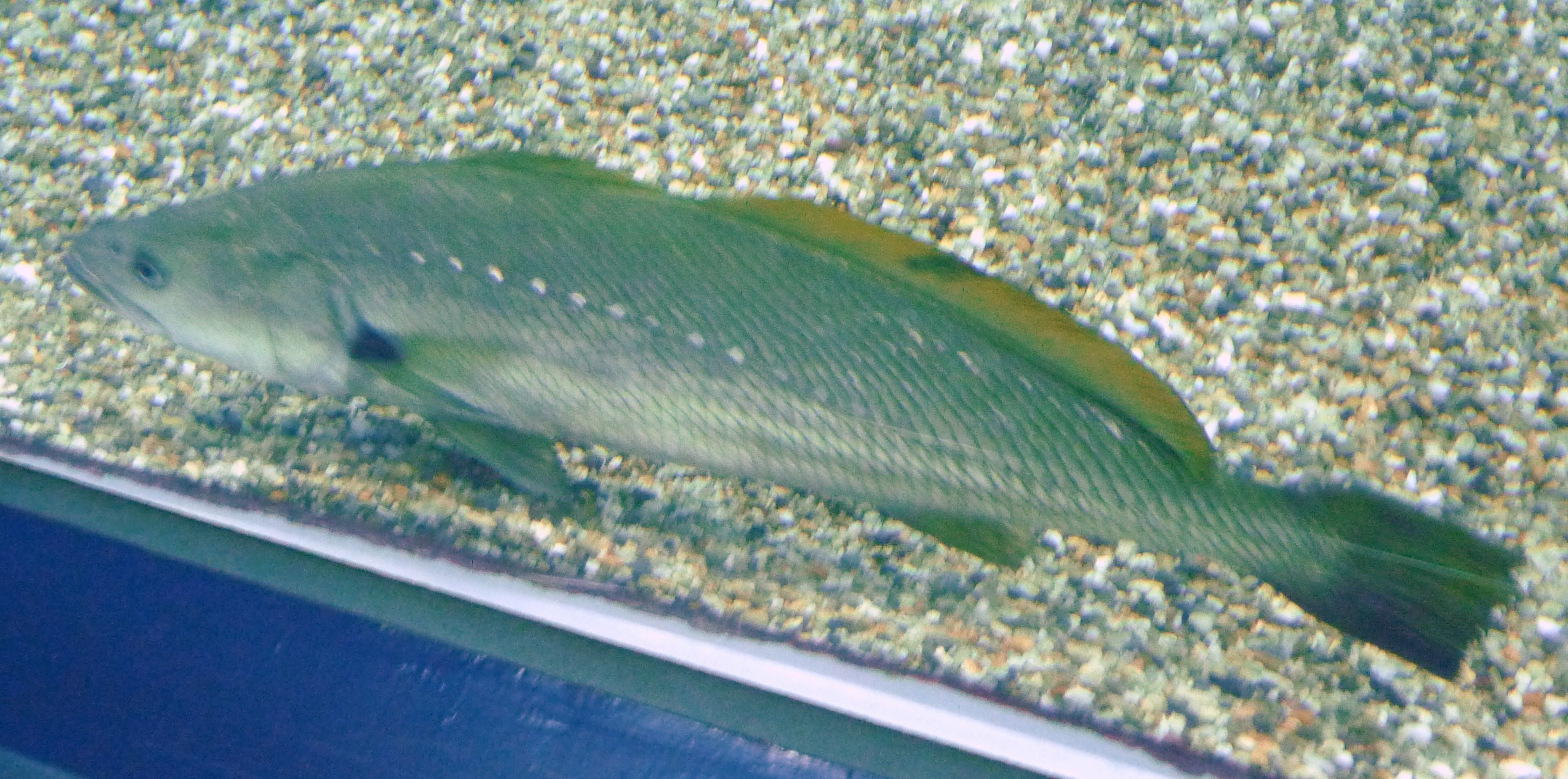

Conservation status
- Endangered (IUCN 3.1)

Scientific classification
- Kingdom: Animalia
- Phylum: Chordata
- Class: Actinopterygii
- Division: Teleostei
- Order: Acanthuriformes
- Family: Sciaenidae
- Genus: Argyrosomus
- Species: A. japonicus

Binomial name
- Argyrosomus japonicus Temminck & Schlegel, 1844
- native range, IUCN 2018 data

= Argyrosomus japonicus =

Species of fish

Argyrosomus japonicus is a silvery to bronze-green colored saltwater fish of the family Sciaenidae, which may grow up to 2 m (6 ft 7 in) in length and weigh up to 82 kg (181 lb). It is known as Dusky Kob, dusky salmon, salmon, Kob and kabeljou' in South Africa, Japanese meagre (FAO), mulloway or jewfish in the eastern states of Australia and South Australia, Ô-nibe (大鮸, オオニベ) in Japan, and Sawwa Krokar Fish or Sawwa Machli in Pakistan. The name jewfish refers to its large otoliths, which are prized as "jewels" by some fishermen.

== Description ==
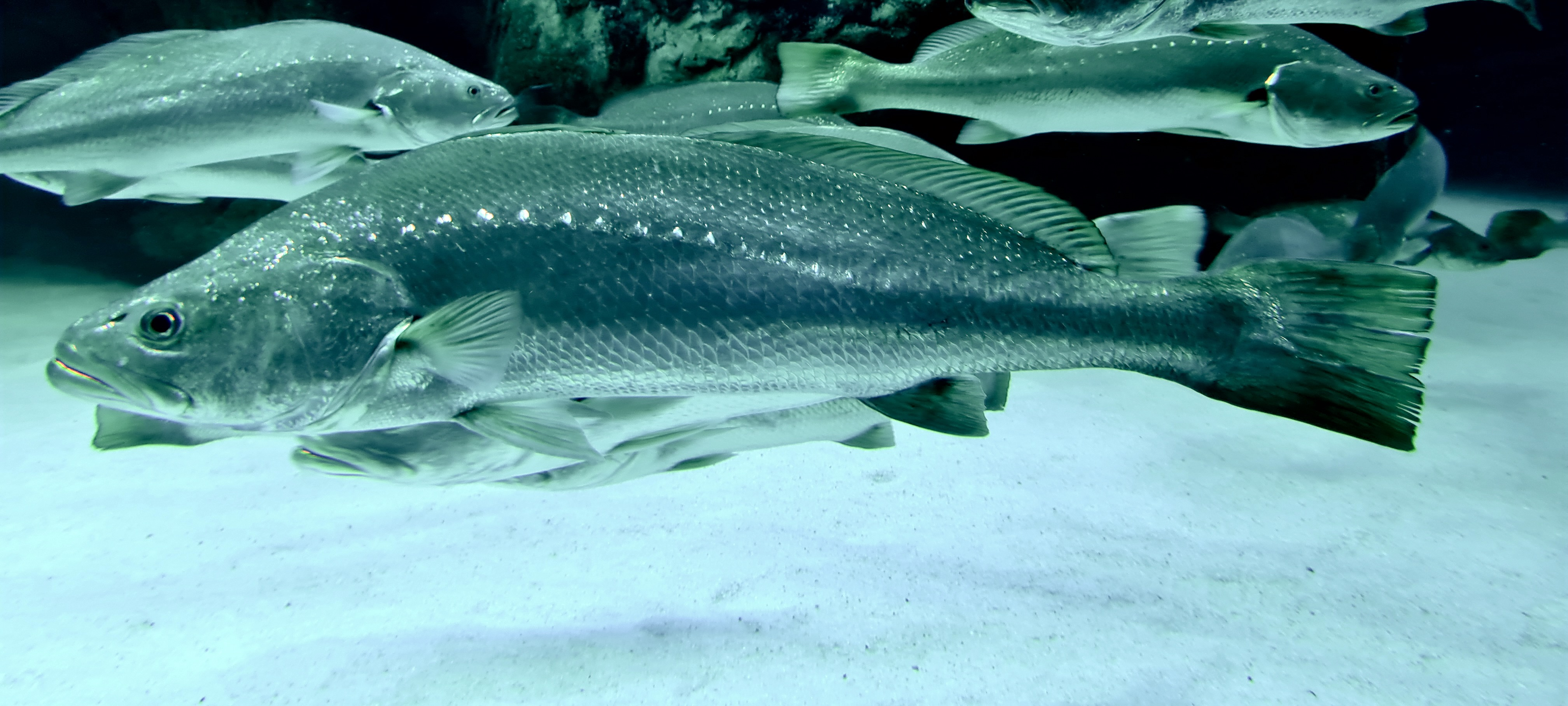
A school of A. japonicus

Argyrosomus japonicus is a large, slender fish which can grow to 2 m (6 ft 7 in). It has a copper-colored head and is silvery with a bronze-green dorsal surface and paler belly. It has a row of distinctive white spots running along the lateral line. The caudal fin is angular in juveniles but becomes more rounded in larger fish.

== Distribution and habitat ==
Argyrosomus japonicus has an Indo-Pacific distribution occurring in coastal waters surrounding Australia, Africa, India, Pakistan, China and Japan. Adults are gregarious and are found over soft bottoms mainly beyond the surf zone, occasionally going inshore. Juveniles are exclusively found in shallow seas and sometimes move into the brackish water of estuaries.

== Mulloway/jewfish in Australia ==
As explained above Argyrosomus japonicus, are commonly known by different names across Australia, but most Australians refer to them as mulloway or jewfish. They are a prized catch when it comes to fishing and are notoriously difficult to target. They are even fondly referred to as 'silver ghost', 'elusive jewfish', 'river kingfish', 'jewie', 'soapy' and 'silver slab'. Mulloway have a wide distribution in Australia, from the Gascoyne region on the west coast of Western Australia, around the southern coasts of the continent, and up to the Wide Bay–Burnett region on the east coast of Queensland. In Australia, the largest specimen of Argyrosomus japonicus caught was 42.5 kg (94 lb), around half the size of the South African record.

According to the Department of Primary Issues for New South Wales:

Mulloway have been classified as Overfished in NSW since 2004/05 and a Recovery Program (RP) to assist the stock to rebuild was implemented on the 1st November, 2013.

The above recovery plan introduced changes to the "bag limits" on fish for both Recreational and Commercial fishing.

Later in 2018, NSW Minister for Primary Industries, Niall Blair commented:

Despite efforts by fishers, a recent scientific review showed Mulloway are still overfished. In order for stocks to recover, the review recommended that more action needed to be taken.

Recreational bag limits were further reduced to just one fish 70 cm or larger, with a boat limit of two fish (if two or more fishers onboard) and a Charter Boat limit of 3 per boat per day. Note that these are daily bag limits, not possession limits. Many other species have possession limits imposed as well as daily bag limits, but mulloway currently do not.

=== Stock status ===
As of 2020, the stock status of mulloway in New South Wales is classified as 'depleted'. In South Australia and Western Australia, the stock status is 'sustainable'. In Queensland, the stock status is 'undefined'.

=== Habitat ===
Mulloway or jewfish can be found from the brackish water up the top of estuaries down to the mouths, bays, rocks and beaches all the way out to offshore reefs. They can even be found near urban areas, such as under deep water marinas, boat moorings, bridges, and jetties, as well as under natural structure like shelving rocks and caves. They are accessible to the majority of Australian Recreational Anglers.

=== Diet ===
Although described as a benthic carnivore, Mulloway are capable of feeding throughout the water column. Mysid shrimp are important food items for smaller juvenile fish (<150 mm (5.9 in)). As the fish increase in size the diet changes to include small finned fish, then larger finned fish and squid and other cephalopods.

== Kob/kabeljou in Southern Africa ==
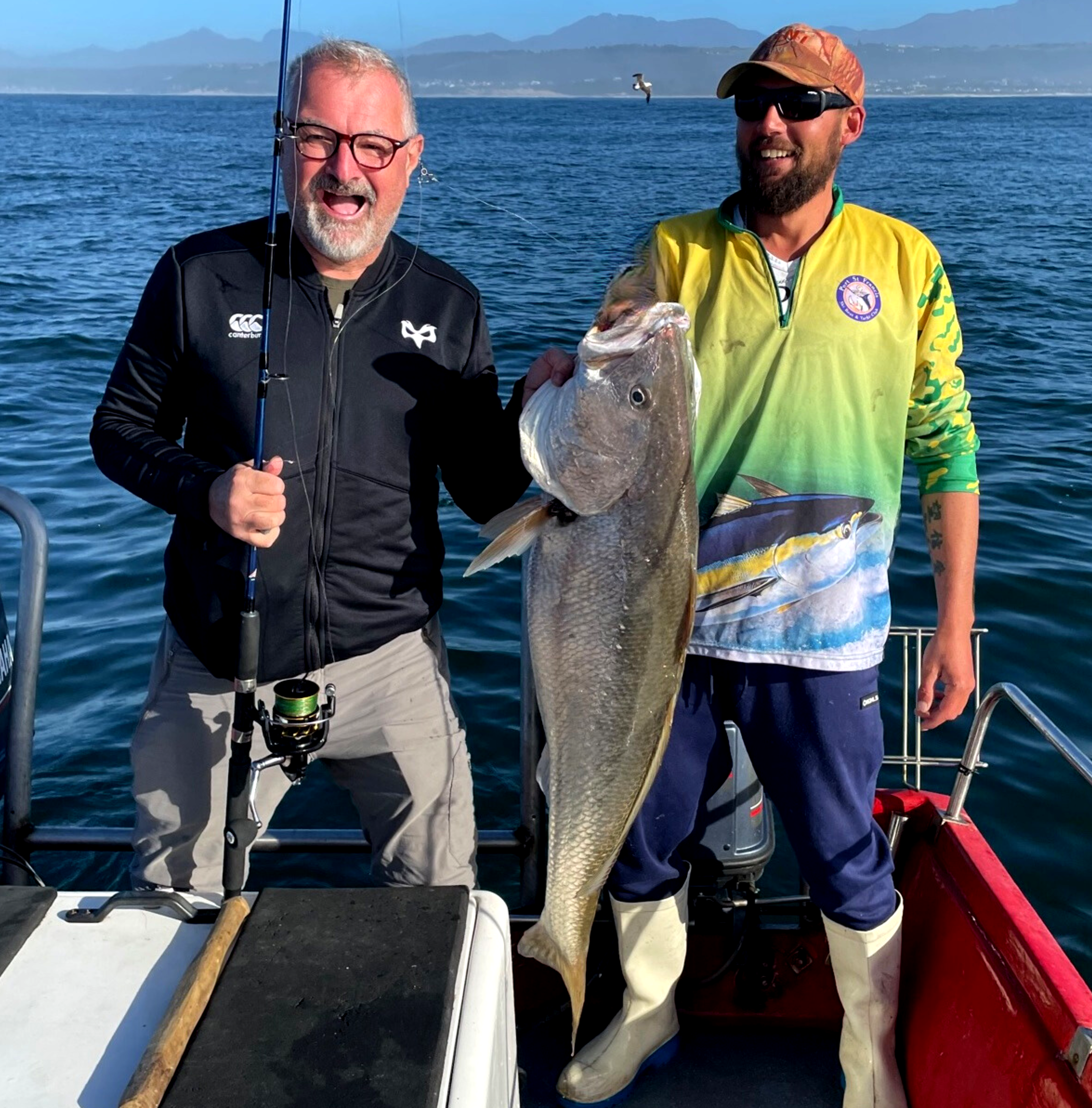
A 13 kg dusky kob caught off Mossel Bay, South Africa

Argyrosomus japonicus, are commonly known as dusky kob or kabeljou in South Africa. They are found in the south-eastern seaboard of southern Africa where they occur from False Bay to southern Mozambique.

Habitat

Adults can reach 2 m (6 ft 7 in) in length and 80 kg (180 lb) in weight, and are predominantly found near-shore, from the surf-zone down to 120 m (390 ft). The juveniles are highly dependent on estuaries then move into the adjacent surf-zone as they grow. The adult populations from the Western Cape and Eastern Cape regions migrate to KwaZulu-Natal to spawn in the winter and spring seasons.

Recreational fishing

Dusky kob is one of the most important species targeted in the recreational, subsistence and commercial line fisheries. Kob that are less than 110 cm (3.6 ft) total length are commonly targeted by estuarine and surf-zone anglers, while adults are caught mainly while recreational deep sea fishing. There are limitations on recreational catches in South Africa, with a daily bag limit of 1 per person, per day if caught from the shore and 5 per person, per day if caught anywhere from a boat offshore. The minimum size limit is 50 cm (20 in) total length if caught from a boat offshore, however, only one kob greater than 110 cm total length may be caught per person, per day.
