= S. malayanus =

S. malayanus may refer to:

- Sphecius malayanus, a wasp species in the genus Sphecius
- Suncus malayanus, a shrew species
- Synagrops malayanus, a fish species in the genus Synagrops

== See also ==
- Malayanus
