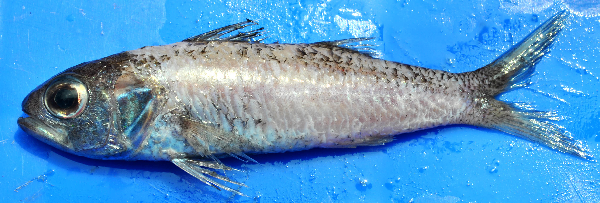
- Synagrops japonicus.

Conservation status
- Least Concern (IUCN 3.1)

Scientific classification
- Kingdom: Animalia
- Phylum: Chordata
- Class: Actinopterygii
- Order: Acropomatiformes
- Family: Synagropidae
- Genus: Synagrops
- Species: S. japonicus

Binomial name
- Synagrops japonicus Döderlein, 1883

Synonyms
- Melanostoma japonicum Döderlein, 1883; Synagrops natalensis Gilchrist, 1922

= Synagrops japonicus =

Species of ray-finned fish

Synagrops japonicus is a species of ray-finned fish within the family of Synagropidae. It was described by Döderlein in 1883.

== Distribution ==
It can be found from Eastern Africa up to the islands of Hawaii. Most of them live at a depth of 100-800 m (330-2600 ft).

== Description ==
They have 10 dorsal spines, 9 dorsal soft rays, 2 anal spines, 7 anal soft rays, and 25 vertebrae. The body is elongated and compressed with large cycloid scales. The body is blackish-brown when young, though after maturing into adults, it becomes paler.
