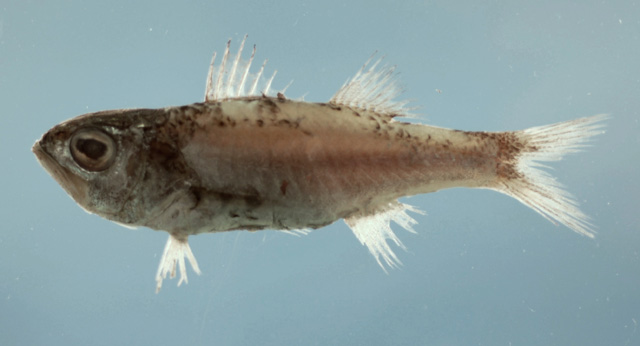

Conservation status
- Least Concern (IUCN 3.1)

Scientific classification
- Kingdom: Animalia
- Phylum: Chordata
- Class: Actinopterygii
- Order: Acropomatiformes
- Family: Synagropidae
- Genus: Parascombrops
- Species: P. spinosus

Binomial name
- Parascombrops spinosus (Schultz, 1940

Synonyms
- Synagrops spinosus Schultz, 1940

= Parascombrops spinosus =

Species of ray-finned fish

Parascombrops spinosus, the keelcheek bass, is a species of ray-finned fish in the family Synagropidae. It is native to the western Atlantic Ocean from Canada to Uruguay.
