= Parascombrops pellucidus =

Scientific classification
- Kingdom: Animalia
- Phylum: Chordata
- Class: Actinopterygii
- Order: Acropomatiformes
- Family: Synagropidae
- Genus: Parascombrops
- Species: P. pellucidus

Binomial name
- Parascombrops pellucidus Alcock, 1889

Synonyms
- Synagrops pellucidus (Alcock, 1889); Synagrops adeni Kotthaus, 1970

Species of ray-finned fish

Parascombrops pellucidus is a species of ray-finned fish in the family Synagropidae.

== Distribution ==
They can be found from the Indian Ocean from East Africa and the Red Sea to the Bay of Bengal. They are common on the deep shelf from 179 to 210 m (587 to 689 ft).

== Description ==
They have 10 dorsal spines, 9 dorsal soft rays, 2 anal spines, and 7 anal soft rays.

== Taxonomy ==
Parascombrops pellucidus was first formally described in 1889 by the British naturalist Alfred William Alcock (1859-1933) with the type locality given as 16 miles east of the Mahanadi Delta at a depth 68 fathoms in the Bay of Bengal. It is the type species of the genus Parascombrops.
