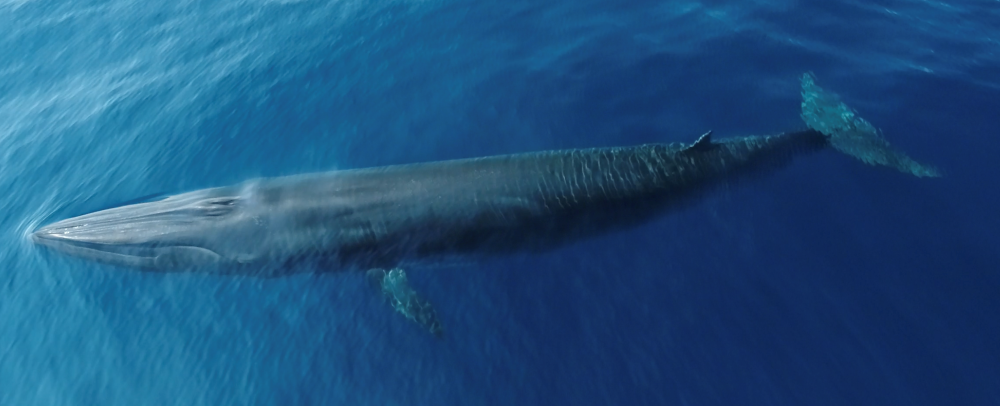
- Rice's whale surfacing in the Gulf of Mexico
- Size compared to an average human

Conservation status
- Critically Endangered (IUCN 3.1)

- Critically Imperiled (NatureServe)
- CITES Appendix I

Scientific classification
- Kingdom: Animalia
- Phylum: Chordata
- Class: Mammalia
- Infraclass: Placentalia
- Order: Artiodactyla
- Infraorder: Cetacea
- Family: Balaenopteridae
- Genus: Balaenoptera
- Species: B. ricei

Binomial name
- Balaenoptera ricei Rosel et al., 2021
- Core range as of June 2019

Synonyms
- Balaenoptera edeni brydei Rice, 1965

= Rice's whale =

Species of baleen whale

Rice's whale (Balaenoptera ricei), also known as the Gulf of Mexico whale, is a species of baleen whale endemic to the northern Gulf of Mexico. Initially identified as a subpopulation of the Bryde's whale, genetic and skeletal studies found it to be a distinct species in 2021. In outward appearance, it is virtually identical to the Bryde's whale. Its body is streamlined and sleek, with a uniformly dark charcoal gray dorsal and pale to pinkish underside. A diagnostic feature often used by field scientists to distinguish Rice's whales from whales other than the Bryde's whale is the three prominent ridges that line the top of its head. The species can be distinguished from the Bryde's whale by the shape of the nasal bones, which have wider gaps due to a unique wrapping by the frontal bones, its unique vocal repertoire, and genetic differences.

It is a medium-sized baleen whale that grows up to 12.65 meters (41.5 ft) in length and weighs up to 13.87–27.2 metric tons (13.65–26.77 long tons; 15.29–29.98 short tons). The Rice's whale inhabits a restricted stretch along the continental slope in the northeastern part of the Gulf of Mexico between depths of 150–410 meters (490–1,350 ft) off the coast of western Florida, although some whales have been sighted in the northwestern portions and the species may have inhabited a wider distribution throughout the Gulf in historical times. It does not migrate but remains within this area year-round. Rice's whales employ a diel vertical diving pattern, in which the whale spends most of the day feeding at or near the seafloor at depths at around 150–250 meters (490–820 ft). At night it feeds closer to the surface. The whale appears to selectively prey on the silver-rag driftfish, which has a very high energy density, although other fishes are suspected to also be consumed.

The Rice's whale is on the brink of extinction and, alongside the vaquita, is one of the most endangered cetaceans in the world. It is listed as critically endangered on the IUCN Red List and protected under the United States Endangered Species Act. The best population estimate is 51, with as few as 26 mature individuals, and the population is continuing to decline. The reasons why the species' population declined to its current state remain poorly understood, but scientists believe that the industrialization of the Gulf of Mexico and the increase of anthropogenic activities within its habitat are primary contributors; unlike most baleen whales it is unlikely that whaling had an impact. Today, the Rice's whale's main threats are related to industrial and commercial activities within its habitat, including oil pollution, ship collisions, and underwater noise from seismic surveys and vessel traffic. It has also shown to be especially vulnerable to local catastrophic events such as the 2010 Deepwater Horizon oil spill, which single-handedly killed nearly twenty percent of the species' population. In 2026, the Trump Administration lifted protections for the Rice's whale which could result in the extinction of the species. In light of the recent lack of sufficient efforts on a U.S. federal level to halt the Rice's whales decline, non-government organization led conservation efforts have been launched to save the species from immediate extinction. This includes the multi-phase Operation Gulf Guardians launched by the Captain Paul Watson Foundation (CPWF).

== Taxonomy ==
=== Discovery and naming ===
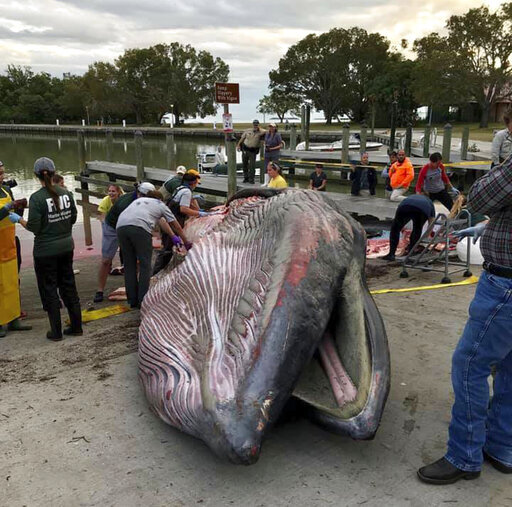
Holotype specimen USNM 594665 being dissected before its burial to extract and study the skeleton

The Rice's whale was likely first documented by the Yankee whaling ship Keziah in 1790, which reported the chasing of a "finback" in the Bay of Campeche. At least 49 additional encounters of "finbacks" were reported throughout the Gulf of Mexico during the 18th and 19th centuries. Scientists generally agree that the "finbacks" were most likely Rice's whales, as it is the only baleen whale that resides in the Gulf year-round. While fin whales (to which the name "finback" applies today), blue whales, sei whales, and common minke whales have been sighted in the Gulf of Mexico, their presence is extralimital and they only appear in the area as occasional wanderers. The Rice's whale was first scientifically recognized by late cetologist Dale Rice in 1965, but as a local population of the closely related Bryde's whale. The extent of its modern geographic isolation was uncovered during the 1990s. During the 20th and early 21st centuries, this group of supposed Bryde's whales was vernacularly referred to as the "Gulf of Mexico whale".

A 2014 mitochondrial and nuclear DNA study by Rosel and Wilcox discovered that the Gulf of Mexico whales belong to a genetically distinct lineage that does not belong to either of the two members of the Bryde's whale complex (B. edeni brydei and B. edeni edeni (Note: Taxonomy per Rosel & Wilcox (2014). The taxonomy of the Bryde's whale complex is unstable, as scientists have disputed whether the two taxa are subspecies of the single species B. edeni or individual distinct species as B. brydei and B. edeni. Rosel et al. (2021) argues in support of the latter. The former interpretation also creates a non-monophyletic relationship that is forbidden in cladistics.)), demonstrating that they may be a new subspecies or species. However, the study refrained from describing a new taxon, which requires a then-absent holotype specimen to erect. The taxonomic situation remained unchanged until 2019 when a dead individual washed up at Everglades National Park in Florida, providing the needed holotype without having to kill or harm any living members of the critically endangered population. This specimen was buried to decompose into a skeleton, exhumed, and transported to the Smithsonian Institution, where it is now cataloged as USNM 594665. In a 2021 taxonomic study, Rosel, Wilcox, and colleagues demonstrated through USNM 594665 that the Gulf of Mexico whale is also morphologically distinct from the Bryde's whale, thus confirming its identity as a new species. The subsequent scientific name Balaenoptera ricei and common name Rice's whale honor Rice for his role in discovering the whales' existence and to commemorate his 60-year contributions to marine mammal science. The study also commented that the naming was done to complement the trend of naming members of the Bryde's whale complex after people.

However, some scientists maintain the use of "Gulf of Mexico whale" as the preferred common name. A 2022 letter by Peter Corkeron of New England Aquarium and colleagues argued that most baleen whales have common names based on their geographic origin (with exceptions typically for wide-ranging species), that specifying a geographic origin encourages greater awareness of the species' endangered status, that the trend of Bryde's whale complex members having names honoring people is inconsistent (i.e. the sei whale's common name references a fish and scientific name a geographic region), and that promoting such perceived trend risks glorifying problematic namesakes (i.e. Eden's whale honors Ashley Eden, a colonial officer of British India). Rosel and colleagues published a response letter in the same journal issue presenting counterarguments, namely that "Gulf of Mexico whale" is too ambiguous and may be confused with other local cetaceans, that a region-specific name alienates outsiders and risks reducing global interest, and that encouraging an alternate common name when "Rice's whale" is already widely used will increase confusion.

=== Phylogeny ===
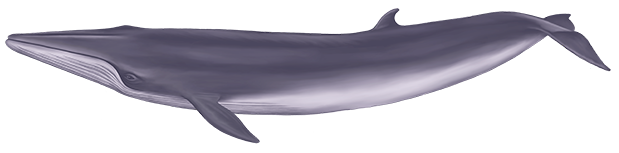
Painting of a Rice's whale

The Rice's whale is a type of "Bryde's-like whale", a group of rorquals within the genus Balaenoptera that are distinct genetically and in skeletal morphology but are near-indistinguishable in outward appearance. Other members of this group include the Bryde's whale (B. brydei), Eden's whale (B. edeni), and Omura's whale (B. omurai). However, Rosel et al. (2021) commented that the term may no longer be necessary.

The following cladogram is modified from a phylogenetic tree constructed by Rosel et al. (2021) based on mitochondrial DNA. (Note: Using a Bayesian analysis) Based on the study, the Rice's whale's closest living relative is the Eden's whale. The two form a clade that forms a polytomy with the sei whale and Bryde's whale.

- Mysticeti
  - Right whales
  - - Minke whales
    - - - Blue whale
        - - Omura's whale
          - - - Eden's whale
              - Rice's whale
            - Sei whale
            - Bryde's whale
      - - Fin whale
        - Humpback whale

== Description ==
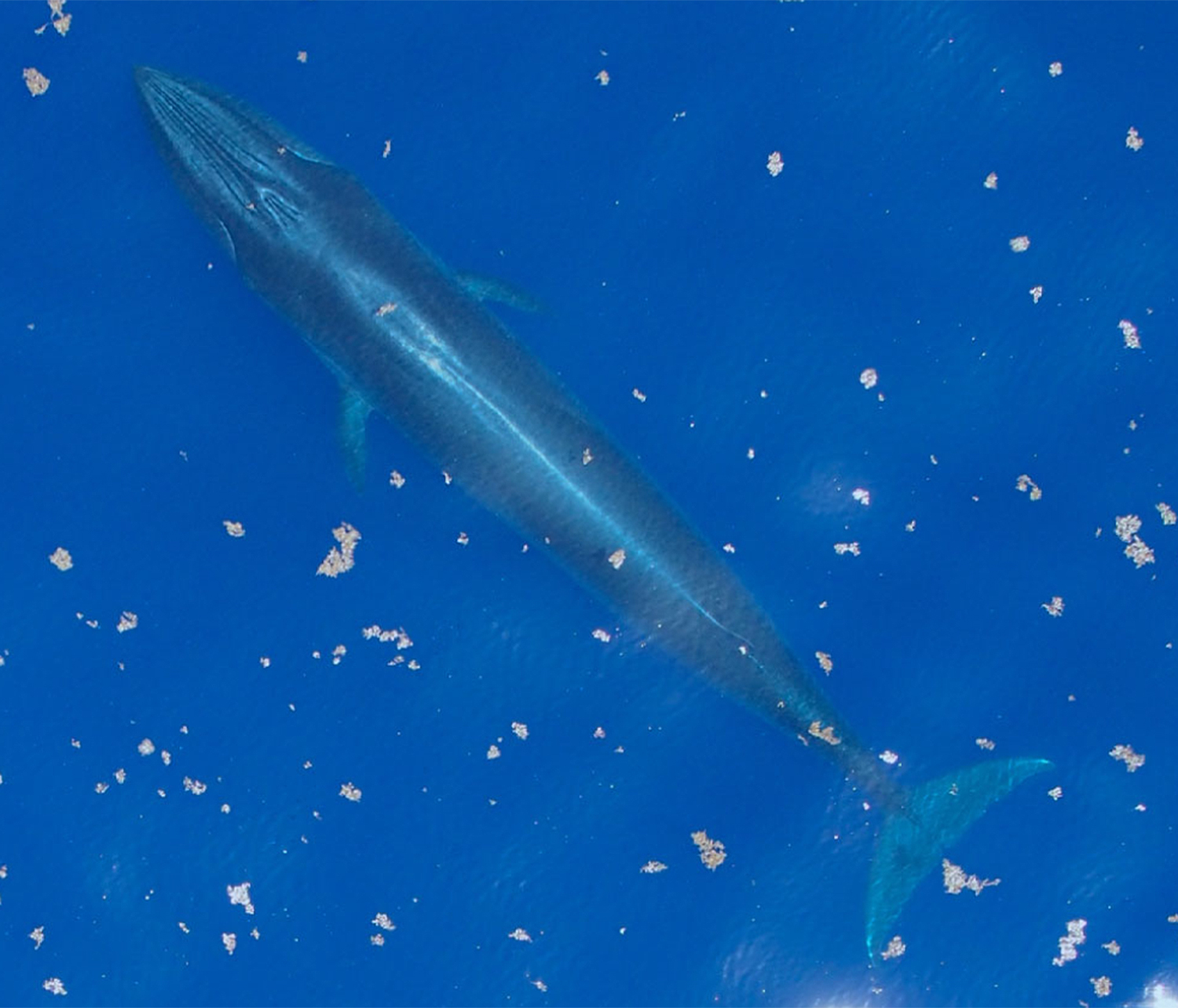
Aerial photograph of a Rice's whale. The three prominent ridges on the head are a diagnostic feature of the species.

It is an intermediate-sized rorqual that is usually about the same size as the Eden's whale, although few adults have been reliably measured to date. The largest measured individual was a lactating female 12.65 meters (41.5 ft) in length; USNM 594665 is the largest known male of the species and is 11.26 meters (36.9 ft) long. Adults may be as small as 7 meters (23 ft) in length, and many verified and possible Rice's whales do not exceed 10 meters (33 ft). One beached calf was measured at 4.7 meters (15 ft) in length. In the wild, another calf has been observed to be around half the length of its supposed parent. One whale that washed up in Louisiana in 1982 was estimated at 15 meters (49 ft), but whether this is a Rice's whale remains unconfirmed as information on the diagnostic rostral ridges was never documented. When using a length-weight function developed by Ohsumi (1980), a 12.65-meter (41.5 ft) length would correspond to a mass of around 13.87 metric tons (13.65 long tons; 15.29 short tons). However, the NOAA reports a maximum weight of 27.2 metric tons (26.8 long tons; 30.0 short tons).

=== Appearance and coloring ===
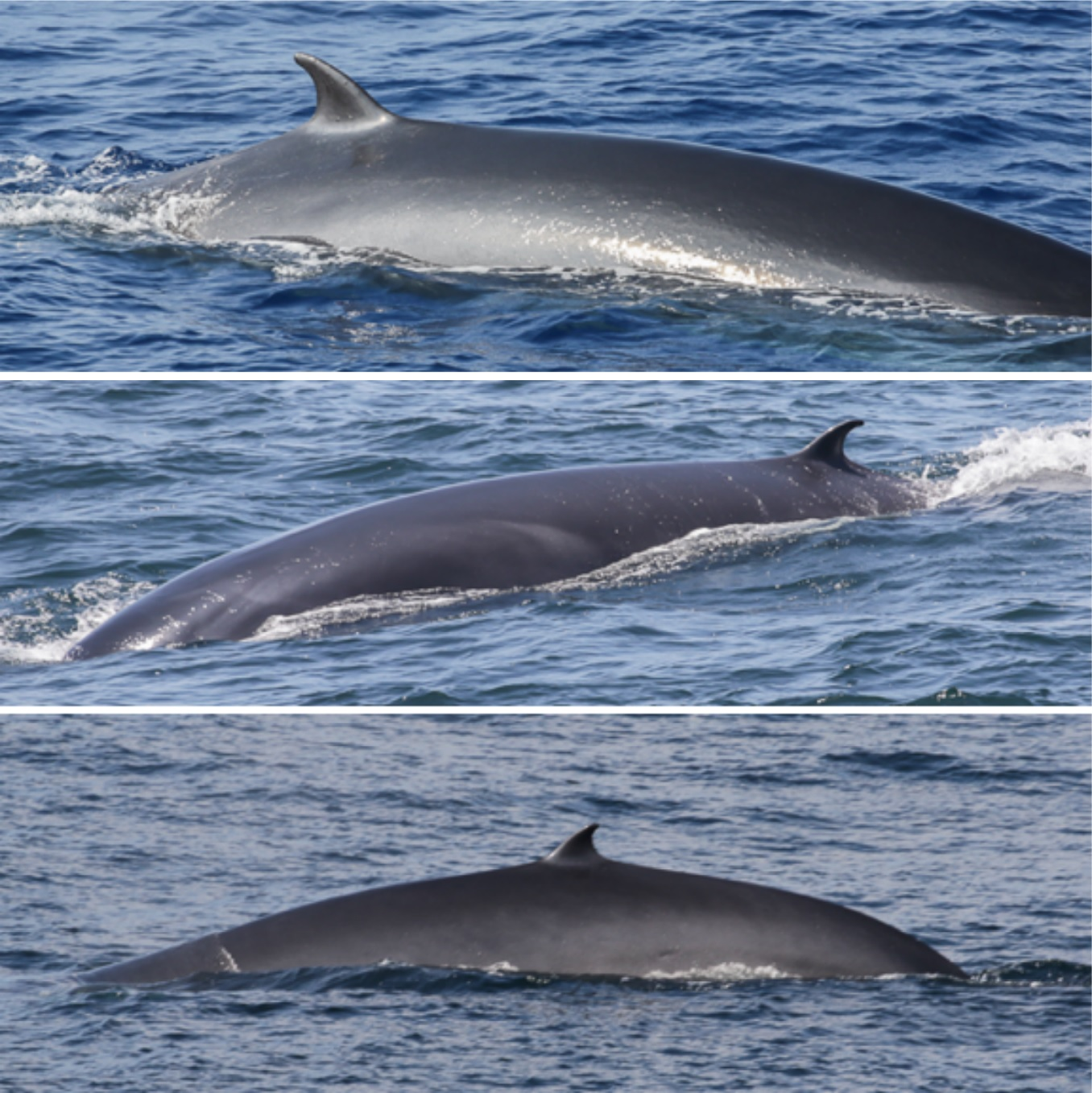
Variations in dorsal fins and backs

In external appearance, the Rice's whale and Bryde's whale are virtually identical and when compared can only be conclusively distinguished by their genetics, skeletal anatomy, and acoustic signatures. Like the Bryde's whale, the body shape is streamlined and sleek. The dorsal fin is shaped like a large hook that can range between ~24–38 centimeters (9.4–15.0 in) tall in adults and located around two-thirds of the length back from the snout. The smooth-edged tail flukes can be up to 320 centimeters (10.5 ft) in width. The flat and somewhat pointed rostrum (top of the head) shows three prominent ridges: a large ridge along the center and two smaller ridges on the left and right sides. This unique trait only appears in Rice's whales and members of the Bryde's whale complex, making it a diagnostic feature when whale watching.

The dorsal side of the body is uniformly dark charcoal gray, although this is sometimes reported as dark brown. The belly and underside of the tail is pale to pinkish. This light coloring is especially prominent on the ventral side of the peduncle. There is neither asymmetric pigmentation on the lower jaws nor blaze or chevron pattering on the body, which distinguishes the Rice's whale from fin whales and Omura's whales. The flippers are uniformly dark-colored. In some phenotypic variations, a gradient of white also appears around the rim of the dorsal fin and/or along the side of the body, but there is no consistency of the trait between individual whales.

Forty-four to 54 ventral pleats run down the underside of the mouth, which are creases that allows the whale to expand the inside of its mouth when feeding. The pleats usually reach up to the navel, but some pleats extend beyond it. In the holotype specimen, one pleat extended 36 centimeters (14 in) beyond the navel and two additional elongated pleats were observed, although they could not be measured.

=== Skeleton ===
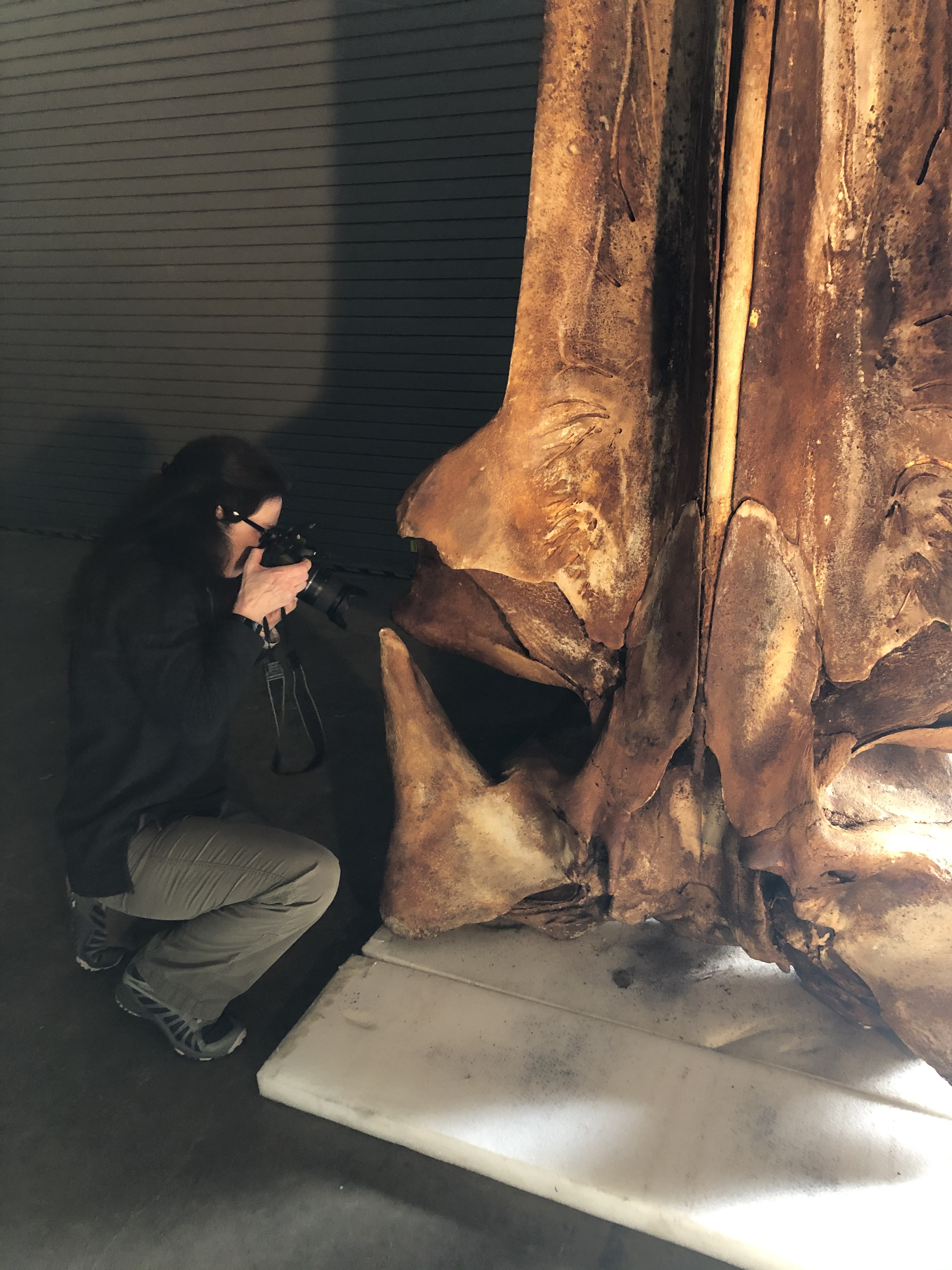
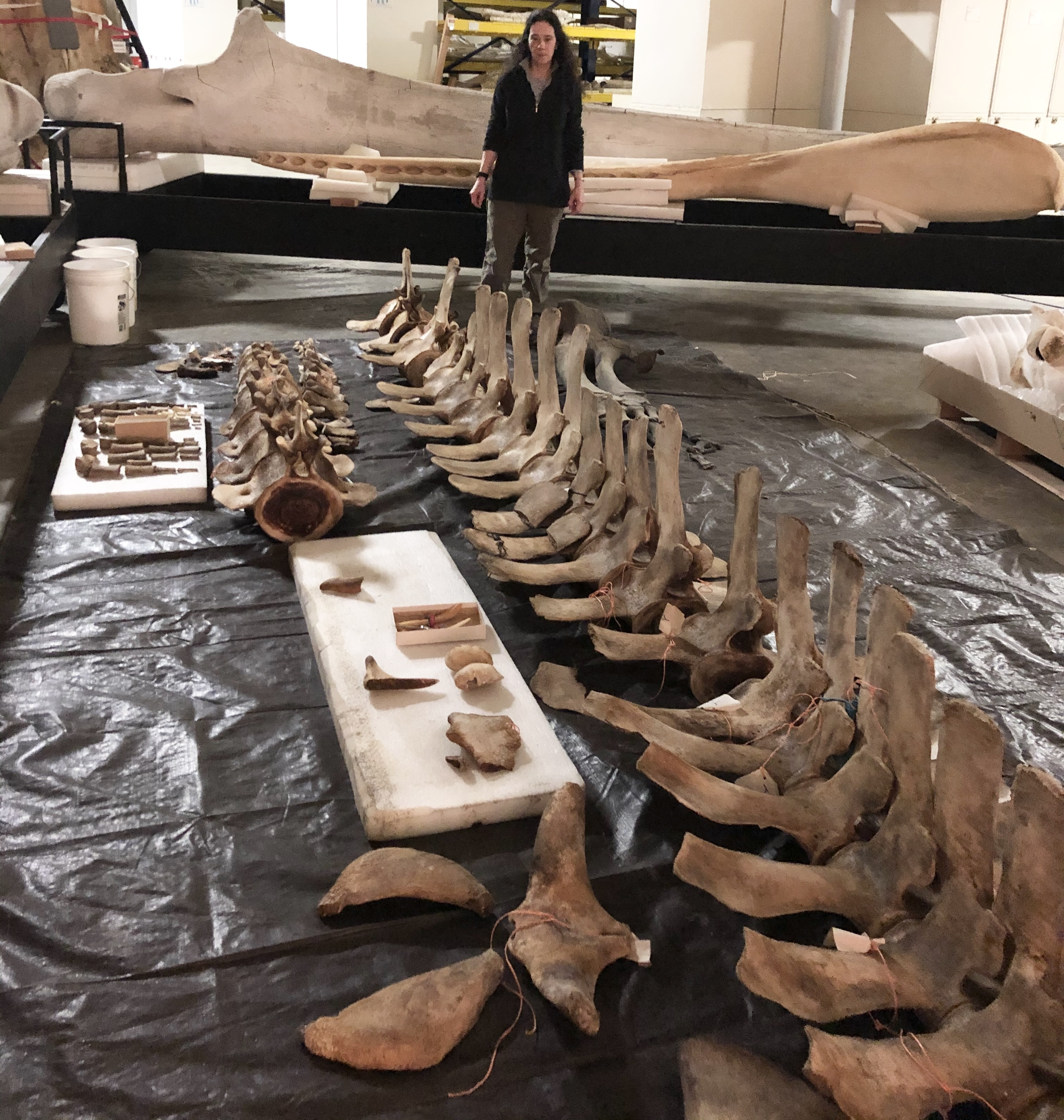
Skeletal parts of USNM 594665 showing underside of skull (left) and postcranial bones (right) with human reference

Knowledge of the skeletal anatomy is largely inferred from the holotype. However, it is not the only skeletal remains of Rice's whales accessible to science. Rosel et al. (2021) listed three additional specimens that were recovered in earlier years. The first is a skull (LSUMZ 17027) that was discovered in the Chandeleur Islands, Louisiana in 1954, which was initially identified as a fin whale but later genetically confirmed to be a Rice's whale. However, the skull is incomplete. The second is a complete skeleton (USNM 572922) recovered from a 11.05-meter (36.3 ft) long subadult that washed up in North Carolina in 2003. The third is the skeleton (UF33536) of the 12.65-meter (41.5 ft) long lactating female, which washed up in Tampa Bay, Florida, in 2009 and was subsequently disposed of via burial at a nearby park. Prior to the stranding of USNM 594665, this was considered a candidate specimen to serve as the Rice's whale holotype, but upon its excavation in 2018 it was found that the skull was crushed and much of the skeleton corroded as tides submerged it in water over the nine years it was buried.

==== Skull ====
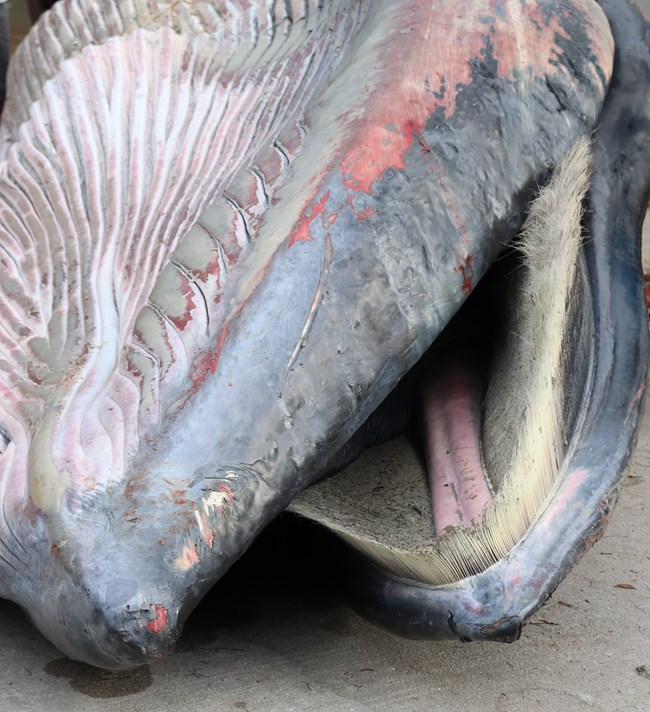
Closeup of USNM 594665's mouth, showing the blackening of baleen in the upper posterior positions

The holotype skull is 284.4 centimeters (9.33 ft) long, making up a little over one-fourth of the total body length, and 142.6 centimeters (4.68 ft) wide. The upper jaw is 204.5 centimeters (6.71 ft) in total length and 86.7 centimeters (2.84 ft) wide at the antorbital notch (the point before the maxillary bone expands to connect with the rest of the skull).

The skull morphology between Rice's whales and Bryde's whale diverge in the nasals and adjacent bones, which are the primary diagnostic features defined by Rosel et al. (2021) that morphologically distinguishes between the two species. In the Rice's whale, the frontal bones uniquely wrap around the posterior tips of triangular nasal bones and extend down in between them, which opens a larger gap compared to Bryde's whale and Eden's whale and does not narrow posteriorly. The Rice's whale can also be distinguished from the Eden's whale by the narrow exposure of the frontals between the maxilla's ascending processes and supraoccipital, and from the Omura's whale by how the premaxilla extends to the frontals.

Like all baleen whales, the jawlines of the skull are lined with bristles of baleen instead of teeth. In Rice's whales, the fringes of these plates throughout the jawline and all baleen in the anterior jaw positions are uniformly cream in color, which darken into black in the posterior positions above the fringe. The number of plates per jawline is variable and may between 230 and 290 plates. The length of the largest plate can range between 42–44.2 centimeters (16.5–17.4 in).

==== Postcranial ====
There are fifty-three vertebrae in the spinal column. This is slightly fewer than in relatives like the sei whale and Bryde's whale, which have 56–57 and 54–55 vertebrae respectively. The vertebral formula is: seven cervical vertebrae in the neck, thirteen thoracic vertebrae in the upper back, thirteen lumbar vertebrae in the lower back, and twenty caudal vertebrae in the tail. Thirteen pairs of ribs connect each thoracic vertebrae, with the head of each first rib bifurcating into two ends. There are a few unique features in the postcranial skeleton. The stylohyal bone, the largest component of the hyoid apparatus that stabilizes the larynx, pharynx, and tongue, is broad and exhibits little curvature. This contrasts with the stylohyal bones in Bryde's whales, which have a degree of curvature and are longer than wide. In the vestigial hip, the pelvic bones are nearly straight, with only one side having a tiny projection.

== Range and habitat ==
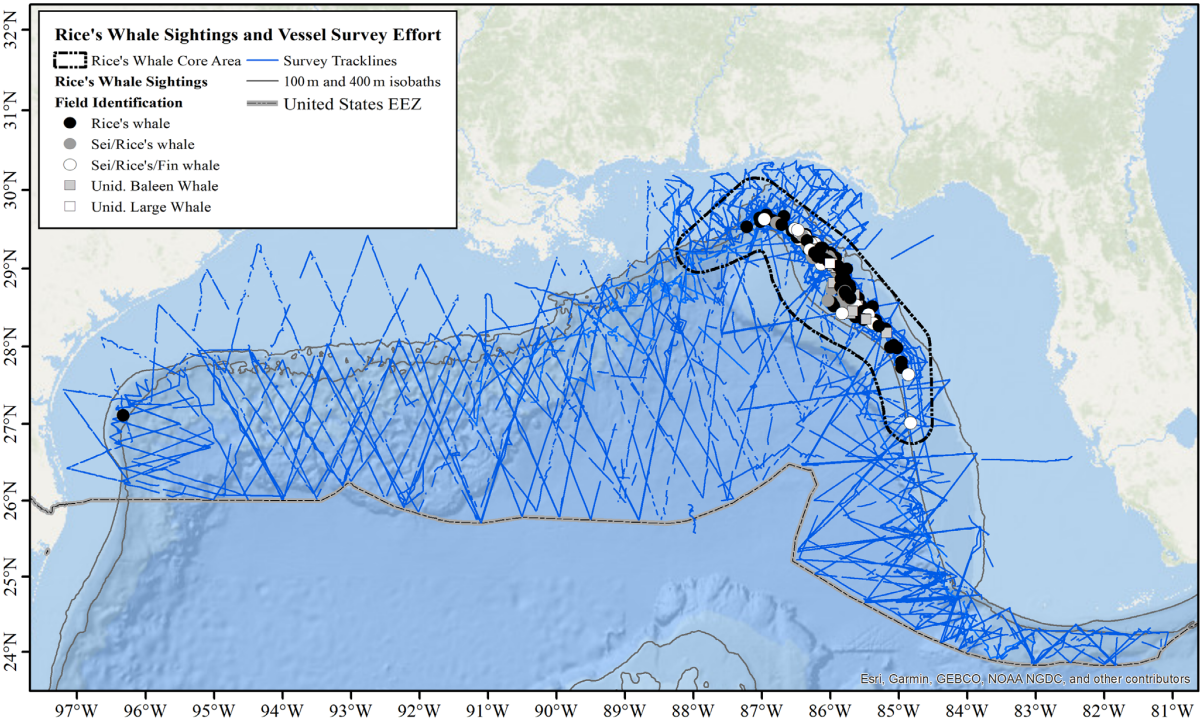
Confirmed and probable Rice's whale sightings by vessel surveys from 2003-2019

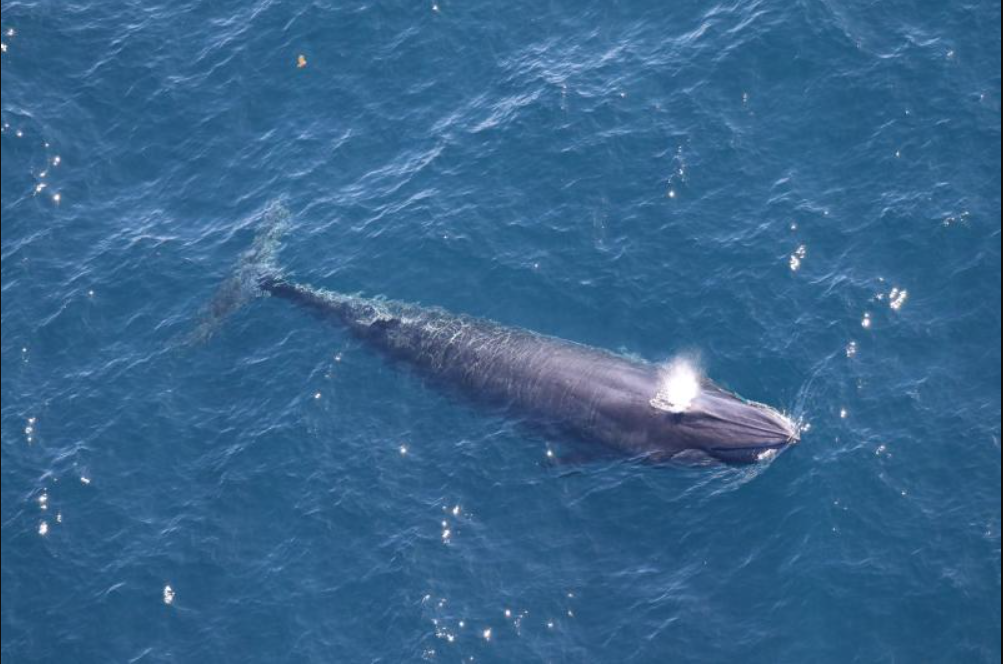
A Rice's whale sighted in the western Gulf of Mexico.

The Rice's whale is mainly restricted to the northeastern Gulf of Mexico. Specifically, scientists identified its core habitat range as a small stretch along the continental slope between depths of 150–410 meters (490–1,350 ft) within and near the De Soto Canyon off the coasts of western Florida, Alabama, and eastern Louisiana. It is a non-migratory species and usually stays within this area year-round, making it the only known baleen whale resident to the Gulf of Mexico. A female that was GPS-tagged for 33 days in 2010 revealed that the whale spent 87.5% of the month within a 1,083.9-square-kilometer (418.5 sq mi) range just north of the De Soto Canyon, leaving only for a single 6-day round-trip to an area 237–245 kilometers (147–152 mi) southeast. The reason as to why the Rice's whale restricts itself to such a small habitat range remains unknown. There were a few live sightings in the western Gulf outside the core habitat, including one sighted off the coast of Texas that was genetically confirmed as a Rice's whale via biopsy. Acoustic surveys off western Louisiana in 2019 also detected Rice's whale calls. These observations occurred on the continental slope at similar depth ranges to the core habitat. There is little evidence that these are attempts in regularly inhabiting western waters, though they may contain a marginal habitat zone.

Whaling logbooks during the 18th and 19th centuries document at least 50 occurrences of "finbacks" (likely Rice's whales) distributed throughout the Gulf of Mexico, suggesting that the species once had had a wider historical distribution. These encounters concentrated near the continental slopes south of the Mississippi River Basin, in the Bay of Campeche, and north of the Yucatán Peninsula and occurred at a wider depth range, including some at depths greater than 1,000 meters (3,300 ft). It is still unknown why the Rice's whale's distribution has declined to its current state, but the NOAA considers increased industrialization throughout the Gulf of Mexico and the subsequent underwater noise it brought a likely major factor. It is unlikely that whaling was another major factor, as the species did not recover from supposed whaling mortalities as seen in cetaceans that have been hunted in the past despite local whaling having been defunct for over a century ago, and there are no recorded kill counts.

While the distribution within the American exclusive economic zone in the northern half of the Gulf has been extensively surveyed, the southern Mexican half remains poorly studied, and there remains a possibility that a previously undetected population of Rice's whale might exist there. Opportunistic visual surveys have been conducted between 1997 and 1999 during a series of six oceanographic surveys within the Bay of Campeche and Yucatán Channel. Only one unidentified rorqual was sighted. However, these efforts did not survey other potential habitat locations such as the continental slope north of the Campeche Bank, where a number of historical Rice's whales were recorded. A compilation of recent isolated cetacean encounters in the Mexican Gulf collected by Ortega-Ortiz in 2002 found no records of potential Rice's whales.

Several standings from the Atlantic Ocean have been documented, including whales along eastern Florida, Georgia, the Chesapeake Bay in Virginia, and two genetically confirmed cases from North Carolina and South Carolina. The genetically unconfirmed cases are usually referred to as simply Bryde's-like whales due to the inability to visually differentiate between the Rice's whale and Bryde's whale, which is present in deeper Atlantic waters. There are no confirmed live sightings of Rice's whales in the Atlantic; five recorded observations of Bryde's-like whales during survey efforts in the 1990s in the area are most likely either Bryde's whales or sei whales as they were sighted in waters deeper than 1,000 meters (3,300 ft), far from the known range of the Rice's whale. In addition, acoustic studies off Jacksonville, Florida, and Cherry Point, North Carolina, were unable to detect Rice's whale calls. It is therefore evident that Rice's whales are at best extremely rare in Atlantic waters. James G. Mead of the International Whaling Commission suggested that the stranded records are most likely strays that wandered from the Gulf of Mexico.

== Ecology and behavior ==
=== Feeding and diving behavior ===
Diagram of a diel vertical diving pattern

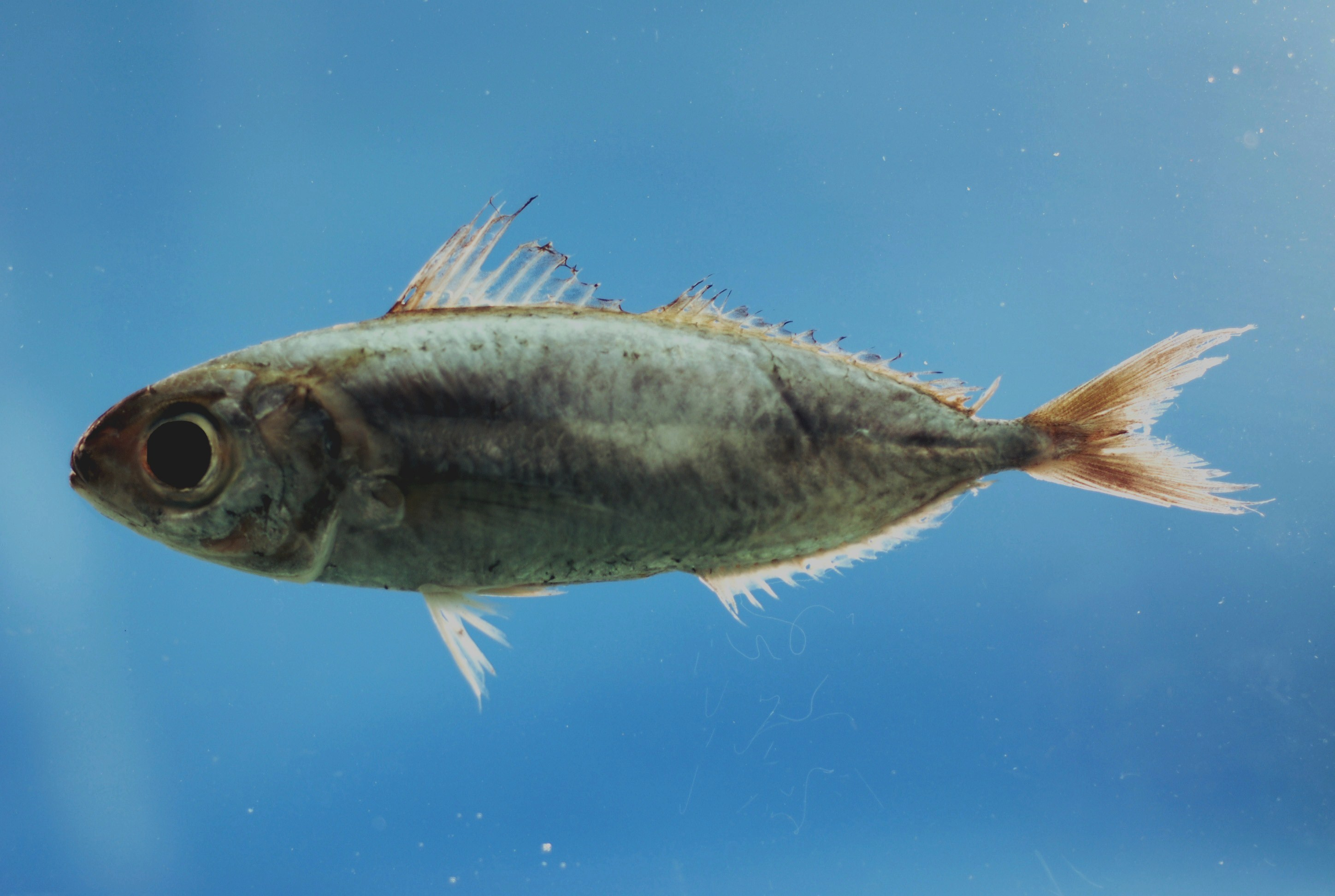
The silver-rag driftfish (Ariomma bondi) is the preferred prey of Rice's whales.

Rice's whales maintain a diel vertical diving pattern, in which whales spend daytime in deep water and nighttime near the surface. This behavior is a foraging strategy that targets diel vertically migrating prey, and is similarly employed by some rorquals like the blue, humpback, and some Brydes' whales. In contrast, many Bryde's whale populations often feed at the surface, which Rice's whales have never been observed to do. Kinematic tagging of two individuals in the core habitat observed that the whales spent most of the day performing deep dives of ~150–250 meters (490–820 ft), often corresponding to the seafloor, with as many as 119 daytime deep dives over a 3-day period. Foraging occurred at the bottom of each dive via lunge feeding, usually around one lunge per daytime dive. This is a lower frequency that is observed in other rorquals that forage at depth, where multiple lunges are usually done per dive, but is consistent lunging rates observed in fish-eating rorquals. Alternatively, the low lunge frequency may reflect low density of target prey, where which limiting lunges per dive optimizes oxygen expenditure. During forages, the Rice's whales were observed to circle their prey prior to lunging. During nighttime hours, the whales spent 85% of their time within 15 meters (49 ft) of the surface and at least 45% within 2 meters (6.6 ft). Foraging dives almost never occurred at night, but remained at moderate depths of around ~100 meters (330 ft) whenever they did.

The full diet of Rice's whales remains subject to ongoing investigation. A 2023 stable isotope analysis from skin biopsies and trawling surveys of potential prey in the core area reconstructed a primary diet on the silver-rag driftfish, a demersal schooling fish, which made up 66.8% of the dietary profile. This appears to reflect selective preference, as silver-rags comprised only 1.21% of the core area's nektonic community by relative abundance. In contrast, the ecologically similar Atlantic pearlside has a relative community abundance of over 88% but contributed only 9.1% of the reconstructed diet. Selectivity is likely related to prey quality; silver-rags have considerably higher caloric and nutrient densities than other local species Rice's whales may feasibly consume. Not all possible prey species have been accounted for, however, as a 2026 study found that eDNA recovers the presence of several more species at greater abundances than trawling surveys have previously landed. Additional suspected prey include lanternfish, sackfish, and ocean-basses.

GPS data from an individual tagged in 2010 found that the whale swam at an average sustained speed, the speed at which the animal travels without tiring, of 1.2 kilometers per hour (0.75 mph) when staying within a specific location, and 3.6–4.0 kilometers per hour (2.2–2.5 mph) when traveling over long distances. The fastest sustained speed recorded was 6.3 kilometers per hour (3.9 mph).

=== Vocalization ===
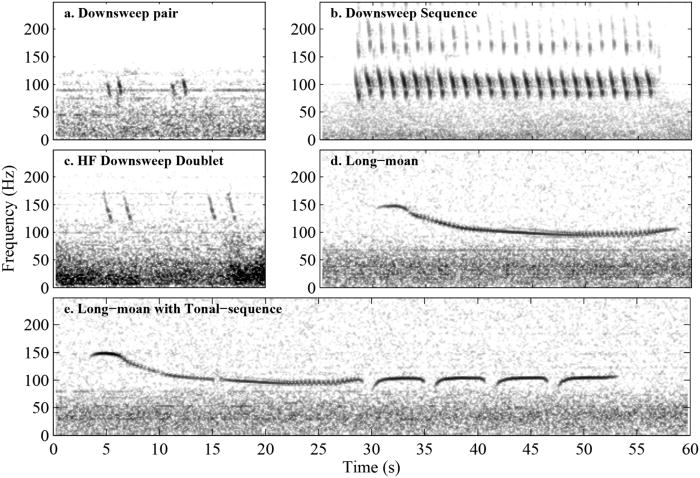
Spectrograms of call types attributed to Rice's whales

The whale may exhibit a unique vocal repertoire (Note: The most objective identification of these calls is Bryde's-like whale. While the Rice's whale is the only species of the group to exist in the Gulf of Mexico and demonstrate a distinction with other species, a contrary identification cannot necessarily be disproven as none of the recorded whales were genetically sampled. The same caveat exists for every other study of the population that did not include genetic testing.) that differs from the acoustic signatures of Bryde's whales or any other known baleen whale, making vocalization a potential diagnostic feature. Five call types are known for wild Rice's whale, although only three of them have been definitively linked to the species. Two additional call types have also been documented from a captive juvenile. Each individual makes around 22 calls per day, with each call producing on average 8.2 sounds per hour.

Long-moans are the most common call types. They usually last between 20 and 27 seconds at a frequency range between 43 and 208 Hz and exhibit a regular pattern of amplitude modulation with a modulation frequency of 3.4 Hz. In occasional association with long-moans are tonal-sequences, which consists of a series of narrow-bandwidth tonals that each have an average duration of 3.6 seconds at a frequency range of 99.4–107.4 Hz. The tonal-sequences can contain up to 6 different tonals. The occurrence of tonal-sequences after long-moans are relatively rare; only 3.2% of documented long-moans are followed by tonal-sequences with a mean time gap of 3.87 seconds. A last set of call types are the downsweeps, brief sounds characterized by a sharp drop in frequency from beginning to end. In the Rice's whale, there are multiple documented variations of downsweeps. The first variation is the downsweep-sequence that occurs in repetition; sequences range between 2 and 27 downsweeps with an average of 0.8 seconds between each downsweep. Each individual downsweep usually lasts 0.3 seconds with frequencies beginning at 113 Hz and ending at 51 Hz. Another variation consists of "pulse pairs" of downswept pulses that start with a start-end frequency range of 143–78 Hz with individual pulses and interpulse intervals ranging between 0.4 and 0.7 seconds and 0.6–1.3 seconds respectively. A third possible variation consists of a three-segment sequence of downsweeps that occur at higher frequencies of 170–110 Hz. Each segment may include single downsweep, doublets, or triplets. Of these five documented call types, only the long-moans, downsweep-sequences, and pulse pairs have been definitively linked with individual whales. The other two documented types have yet to be verified in the same manner, but scientists generally agree that they belong to the Rice's whale through parsimony.

In November 1988, a stranded female was rescued and treated in captivity at SeaWorld Orlando until her release in January 1989. This whale was 6.9-meter (23 ft) juvenile estimated to be around 1–2 years old. While in captivity, her acoustic signatures were monitored, and two types of calls were documented. The first was a growl-like pulsed moan that lasted between 0.5 and 51 seconds at a rate of 20–70 pulses per second with a frequency range of 200–900 Hz. They were first detected during late December and occurred periodically in the absence of humans in the tank, stopping only when the tank's surface sprinkler system was turned off in preparation for feeding or repair. The second was a sequence of discrete pulses lasting 10 milliseconds each at a frequency range of 400–600 Hz with intervals of 50–130 milliseconds between each pulse. They were rare, but sometimes occurred immediately before, after, or in-between a moan. These call types are unique among Rice's whales, but they may be due to the special circumstances of the captive juvenile. It is possible that the growl-like moans may be related to distress, as similar types of sounds have been documented in other baleen whales when disturbed or in agony. Based on vocal patterns of terrestrial mammals, the moans may also be related to isolation. It is also possible that the two documented call types may be related to age, and that the captive juvenile was intermediate between those of adults and calves. When vocalizing, the whale lowered her head slightly and blew bubbles from her right blowhole. Because this was the only other time it opened, the other when breathing in which both blowholes opened, it is possible that the right blowhole may have had a function with vocalization, specifically the growl-like moans. However, alternative explanations such as illness or behavioral display could not be discounted.

=== Predation ===
Although undocumented, killer whales may be a natural predator.

There are no known observations of predation on Rice's whales, but it is likely that its main predator is the killer whale, which is known in the Gulf of Mexico, as they have been seen attacking local sperm whales and dolphins and are the only known natural predator of the Bryde's whale. There is debated speculation that some baleen whales migrate as an anti-predator adaptation, but the Rice's whale is a non-migratory species that clearly lacks this trait. A known common defensive behavior of rorquals is to flee upon encounter by killer whales, although this would be less effective when a calf must be protected. Killer whales have also been observed to efficiently kill calves within minutes to hours in such a scenario. Given the likely low reproductive rate of Rice's whales due to their small numbers, the species would be especially vulnerable to such predation if it exists, although its rarity makes the chance of observing predation extremely low. The hunting of only a few calves or mothers can be sufficient to drive the population into a predator pit, a situation where the population is trapped in indefinitely low numbers due to predation.

Another potential predator may be the great white shark, which is known to hunt North Atlantic right whale calves in nursery waters off the coast of Florida and Georgia. In addition, it is a common scavenger of Bryde's whale carcasses elsewhere in the world. Like killer whales, however, there is no direct proof that great whites hunt Rice's whales.

== Conservation status ==
The Rice's whale is on the brink of extinction and is one of the most endangered cetaceans in the world alongside the vaquita. Prior to its 2021 description as a distinct species, it was assessed as a subpopulation of the Bryde's whale. The Rice's whale is listed as critically endangered in the IUCN Red List and in Appendix I of the Convention on International Trade in Endangered Species of Wild Fauna and Flora. The U.S. government also lists the Rice's whale as endangered under the Endangered Species Act, thus banning all activities that may directly harm the species within American waters. However, the designation of a critical habitat as mandated under the Act has yet to occur, as information on the habitat ecology remains insufficient. A 2026 study found that the discovery and recognition of the Rice's whale and its population size resulted in minimal public attention through news coverage from 2021 to 2024 and remains relatively obscure, despite its risk of extinction and vulnerability to anthropogenic threats. On March 31, 2026, the committee of federal officials known as the Endangered Species Committee or "God Squad" voted to exempt the oil and gas industry in the Gulf of Mexico from the requirements of the Endangered Species Act, which poses a major threat to the continued existence of the Rice's whale.

=== Population ===
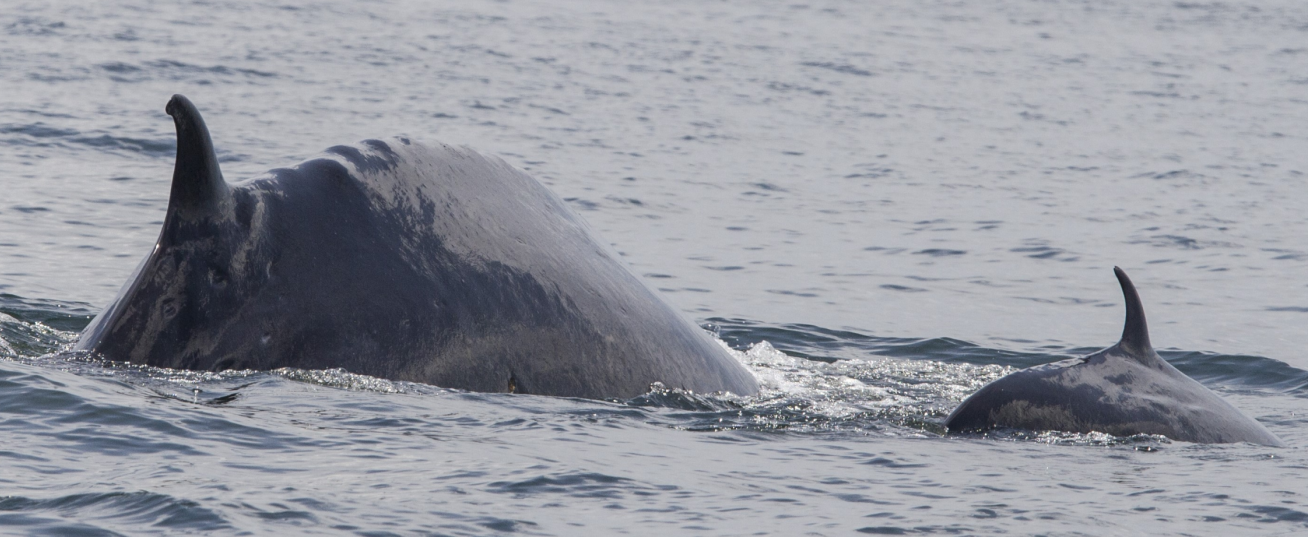
A female Rice's whale swimming with her presumed calf

Both male and female Rice's whales remain and breed within the Gulf of Mexico, contrasting with coexisting local sperm whales that see males wander outside and breed with females from other locations. The Rice's whale sex ratio is somewhat close to 50:50; examinations of 32 whales identified 18 females and 14 males. Individuals are usually seen alone or in pairs but have occasionally been sighted forming larger loose groups that are believed to be associated with feeding.

Population estimates are below 100 individuals and 50 mature individuals, with numbers continuing to decline. Multiple population studies of the species have been conducted since 1991, but due to the difficulty in surveying Rice's whales they are largely based on models and reliable exact figures are difficult to determine. Most models are statistically imprecise, having high coefficients of variation (>CV 0.4). They are also restricted to within the northern Gulf and do not take into account the possible existence of Rice's whales in the southern half. The best estimate to date is 51 individuals (CV 0.50) based on transect surveys in 2017 and 2018. Studies in prior years have approximated abundances throughout the entire northern Gulf of Mexico ranging from 15 to 44 individuals (CV 0.61–1.1). Estimations of mature individuals are based on a 2007 demographic model of Bryde's whales by Taylor and colleagues, which estimates that 51% of the total population is mature.. Using the 2017-2018 population estimate, this yields a mature individual count of 26. Separate estimates exclusive to the northwestern Gulf have produced figures ranging between 0 and 3 individuals (CV 0.81–1.08). These estimates are not comparable to each other through time differences as different variables were applied to each study such as the inclusion or exclusion of habitat stratification.

A 2015 study by Roberts and colleagues produced a larger estimate of 44 whales based on a habitat modeling technique that integrates survey data between 1994 and 2009. This study had the lowest coefficient of variation (CV 0.27), but its estimate aggregated over time. In the same year, a research team commissioned by the U.S. Fish and Wildlife Service produced an estimate of 26 individuals (CV 0.4) when specifically accounting for damage caused by the Deepwater Horizon oil spill using 2003–2009 survey data and different geographic borders than the 2009 estimate.

Due to its extremely low population, the Rice's whale also faces the threat of inbreeding depression, which consequentially severely weakens the remaining population's ability to recover and survive due to the reduction of genetic diversity and accumulation of harmful mutations. To assess how well a population can survive on its own in the wild, geneticists employ the 50/500 rule, where the threshold for a population to successfully combat inbreeding depression is 50 individuals and to reduce mutation-creating genetic drift is 500 individuals. Because the Rice's whale's mature population is far below these thresholds, additional ecological traits such as a k-selected reproduction strategy slows the chance of recovery even further and puts the species at a high chance of entering a phenomenon known as an extinction vortex. It has been projected that an assumed population of 35 Rice's whales would take 68 years to recover to 500 individuals. During this period, the species is more vulnerable to catastrophic events that can further damage the population's recovery chances. Such catastrophes have already happened, the most devastating being the 2010 Deepwater Horizon oil spill.

=== Threats ===
==== Pollution ====
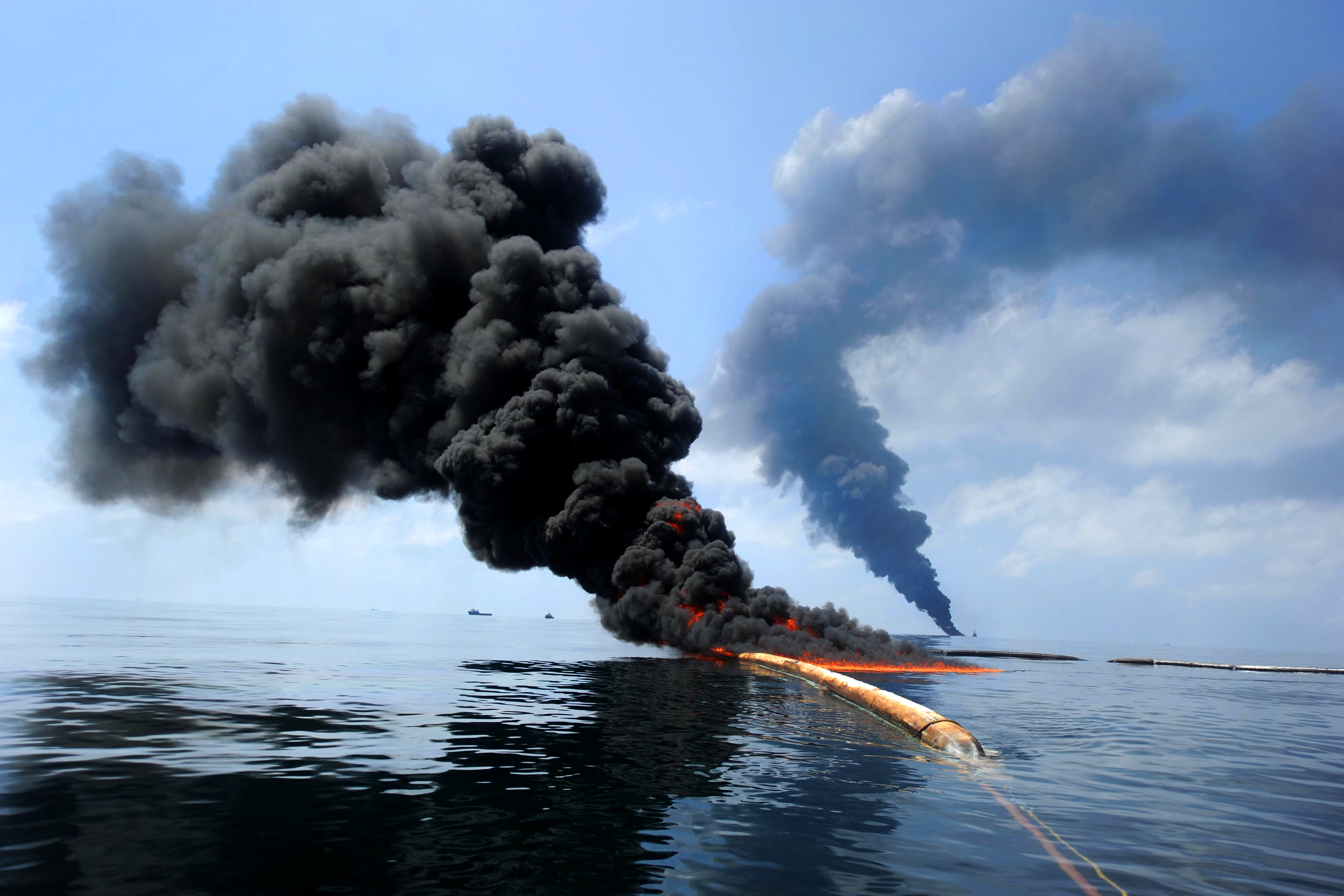
The Deepwater Horizon oil spill is responsible for killing nearly twenty percent of the Rice's whale population.

Oil spills are one of the greatest threats to the species. Multiple offshore drilling operations take place in the Gulf of Mexico, many nearby the Rice's whale core habitat range. Accidents from these operations can release huge quantities of oil into the ocean, which can inflict a range of harmful to lethal effects to marine life including respiratory, digestive, and endocrine disruption, impaired vision, reproductive failure, increased susceptibility to diseases, and direct poisoning. In Rice's whales, contact with oil can also directly damage their baleen and thereby impair the ability to feed. Large oil spills require tremendous human effort to clean up, and some of the most efficient methods in doing so such as the use of dispersants can themselves be toxic to the whale. In addition, oil residue can persist in the environment and inflict long-term damage. Oil spills in the Gulf of Mexico are frequent; between 2011 and 2013 alone there were 46 oil spills that released the equivalent of nearly 160 thousand liters (42×10^{3} U.S. gal) of oil into the Gulf. The 2010 Deepwater Horizon oil spill, the largest oil spill in world history and the worst environmental disaster in U.S. history, released nearly 507 million liters (134×10^{6} U.S. gal) of oil and took place within close proximity of the Rice's whale habitat. A 2015 study to assess the damage inflicted to the species' population found that the oil covered 48% of the core habitat range and reduced the population by 22%: 17% of Rice's whales were killed, 22% of females suffered reproductive failure, and 18% of whales suffered adverse health effects.

Plastic ingestion as a product of increased plastic pollution is another documented source of mortality. The holotype USNM 594665 is currently the only recorded case of death via plastic ingestion. A sharp piece of plastic 6.61 by 6.2 by 0.2 centimeters (2.602 in × 2.441 in × 0.079 in) in size was discovered inside its stomach that lacerated the gastric organ, causing internal bleeding and acute gastric necrosis that led to the whale's stranding and death. However, the NOAA deemed plastic ingestion as a likely low threat to Rice's whales given that such incidents are generally rare in the Gulf of Mexico; less than one percent of stranded marine mammals in the Gulf between 2000 and 2014 showed evidence of ingesting debris. However, it was acknowledged that marine mammal stranding data may not be comprehensive enough.

==== Vessel collision and entanglement ====
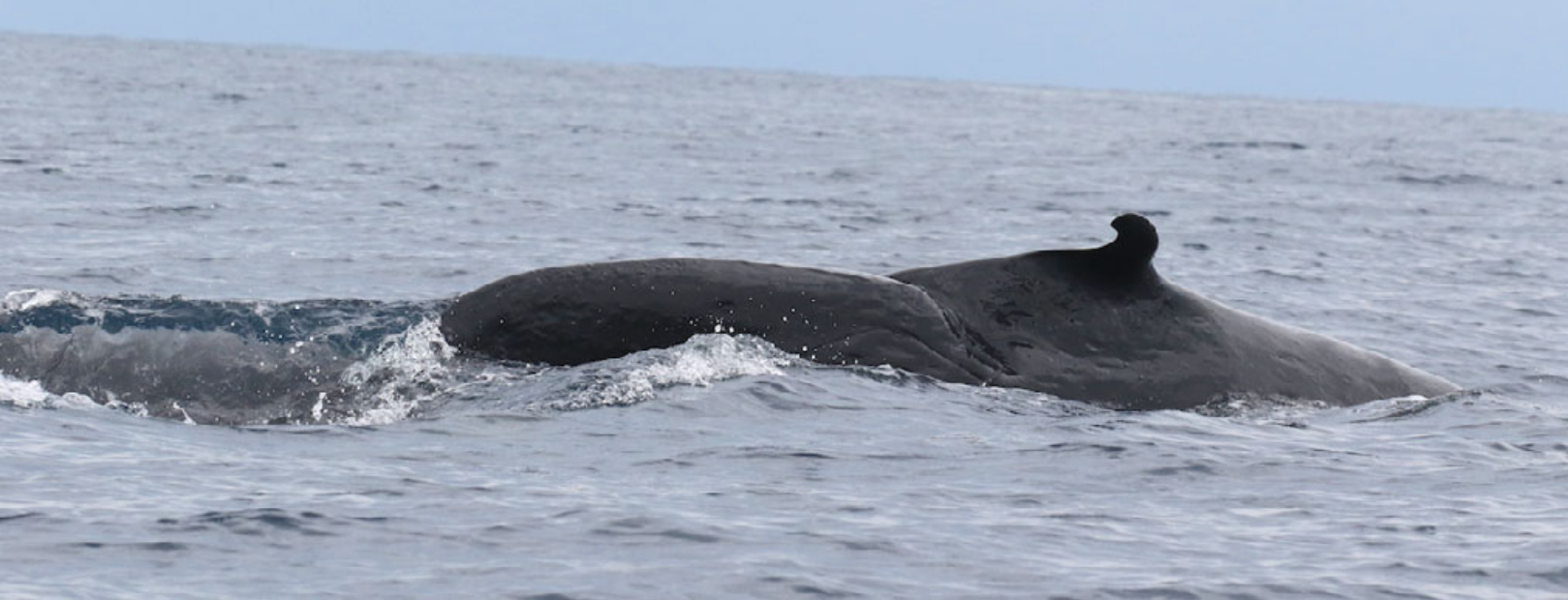
A Rice's whale with a deformed back caused by a ship strike

Collision with ships has been documented in Rice's whales. The lactating female from Tampa Bay (USNM 593536) showed signs of severed vertebrae, lung damage, and internal bruises consistent with a death by a ship strike. In 2019, a live Rice's whale was sighted with a severely deformed spine behind the dorsal fin, damage that is also consistent with vessel collision. The diel vertical diving pattern of the Rice's whale makes it especially susceptible to such collision accidents, given that they may spend the majority of their nighttime hours within 15 meters (49 ft) of the surface, which is also the range that puts cetaceans at the greatest risk of colliding with ships. In addition, the whales are known to be curious at times around ships and periodically approach them to investigate. Rice's whale's most important habitats in the De Soto Canyon and the adjacent continental slope off western Florida are within zones that saw on average 1–25 ships in vessel traffic between 2009 and 2010, but a few shipping lanes that can see up nearly a hundred ships per year also pass through the habitat zone. Some areas in the Gulf of Mexico's northwestern side that have seen nearby occasional Rice's whales are some of the busiest sectors of the Gulf, with hundreds to up to over a thousand ships transiting the area in one year. The lack of quantity in documented ship strikes in the species does not discount its factor as a major anthropomorphic threat. Vessel collisions with cetaceans are generally underreported, and the rarity of Rice's whales would make this issue even greater.

The Rice's whale's usual habitat also overlaps with deep-water reef fish fisheries, which operate by dropping bottom longline nets at the seafloor between depths of 100–300 meters (330–980 ft) during daytime hours to catch yellowedge groupers, tilefish, and sharks. As this is around the time when Rice's whales feed in the same depths, there is a risk of entanglement with the seafloor nets. One genetically unconfirmed 10-meter (33 ft) Rice's whale that washed up in 1974 was determined to have been killed by gear entanglement.

==== Underwater noise ====
A multitude of anthropogenic noises are produced in great quantities from industrial activities throughout the Gulf of Mexico that can harm baleen whales. The loudest and most frequent are seismic surveys associated with offshore oil and gas activities, which occur on a 24 hours per day and 365 days per year basis. Surveys operate by blasting sound waves into the ocean using airguns at frequencies between 5–300 Hz, intensities as high as 260 dB, and pulse rates of one blast every 10–20 seconds. Cetaceans can obtain permanent hearing loss when exposed to sound intensities of 230 dB or higher. As sound levels diminish rapidly as it travels through the water, this type of damage will only occur to whales that are within 100 meters (330 ft) to 1 kilometer (0.62 mi) of a 260 dB airgun. As mitigation, seismic surveys are often mandated to be accompanied by protected species observers and to immediately cease operations whenever within 500 kilometers (310 mi) of a whale.

Another major source of underwater noise is vessel traffic, which contributes significantly to low-frequency noise pollution in the Gulf of Mexico. Scientists expect that this will increase in the future as the Gulf becomes a more commercially important area thanks to developments such as the expansion of the Panama Canal. Shipping noise frequencies often overlap with the acoustics of baleen whales. This can cause auditory masking, which can diminish or block a whale's ability to communicate or detect environmental cues. To work around this problem, the whale may alter its vocalization behavior, but this can further disrupt its communication abilities. In addition, frequent exposure to underwater noise generates a high level of stress for receiving whales, which can alter stress hormone levels, feeding behavior, or cause habitat displacement in avoidance of the noise. Impacts specific to the Rice's whale have yet to be studied, but research on other baleen whales indicates that adverse effects to vessel noise are universal. Studies of Atlantic right whales, whose vocal frequencies are similar to that of Rice's whales and thus may be of similar impact, predicted that vessel noise reduces their communication space by 77%.

=== Conservation Efforts ===
==== Operation Gulf Guardians ====
In light of the precipitous decline of the Rice's whales population, the Ocean Conservation Organization the Captain Paul Watson Foundation (CPWF) launched Operation Gulf Guardians on August 11, 2025. Operation Gulf Guardians is a multi-phase campaign involving educating the public on the Rice's whales and their ecological importance, pressuring local, state, and the U.S. federal government and industries in increasing efforts to protect the Rice's whales and their habitat, and providing steps to the public on how to direct protect surviving individuals and their habitat. The intention of which is to save the Rice's whales from extinction and restore their population to pre-exploitation levels.

== See also ==
- Environmental impact of the Deepwater Horizon oil spill
- List of living mammal species described in the 2020s
- List of cetaceans
- Baleen whale
