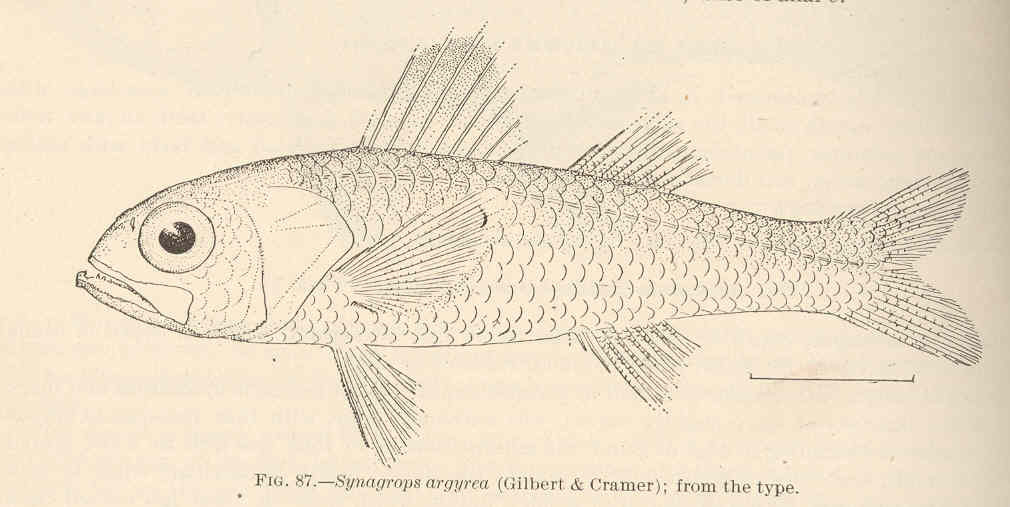

Scientific classification
- Domain: Eukaryota
- Kingdom: Animalia
- Phylum: Chordata
- Class: Actinopterygii
- Order: Acropomatiformes
- Family: Synagropidae
- Genus: Parascombrops
- Species: P. argyreus

Binomial name
- Parascombrops argyreus (Gilbert & Cramer, 1897)

Synonyms
- Melanostoma argyreum Gilbert & Cramer, 1897; Synagrops argyrea (Gilbert & Cramer, 1897); Synagrops argyreus (Gilbert & Cramer, 1897)

= Parascombrops argyreus =

Species of ray-finned fish

Parascombrops argyreus is a species of ray-finned fish in the family Synagropidae. They usually live in waters 168–620 metres (551–2,034 ft) deep.

== Distribution ==
They can be found in the Indian Ocean and the West Pacific. This includes Hawaii, the Tasman Sea to northeastern New Zealand, and off south-east Africa. It is possible that they live in the southwestern Pacific.
