= Parascombrops serratospinosus =

Scientific classification
- Kingdom: Animalia
- Phylum: Chordata
- Class: Actinopterygii
- Order: Acropomatiformes
- Family: Synagropidae
- Genus: Parascombrops
- Species: P. serratospinosus

Binomial name
- Parascombrops serratospinosus (H. M. Smith & Radcliffe, 1912)

Synonyms
- Synagrops serratospinosus H. M. Smith & Radcliffe, 1912

Species of ray-finned fish

Parascombrops serratospinosus, the roughspine seabass is a species of ray-finned fish in the family Synagropidae. It is found in the Western Pacific commonly from Taiwan and the Philippines to northwestern Australia and Vanuatu but it is rare in the waters off Japan
