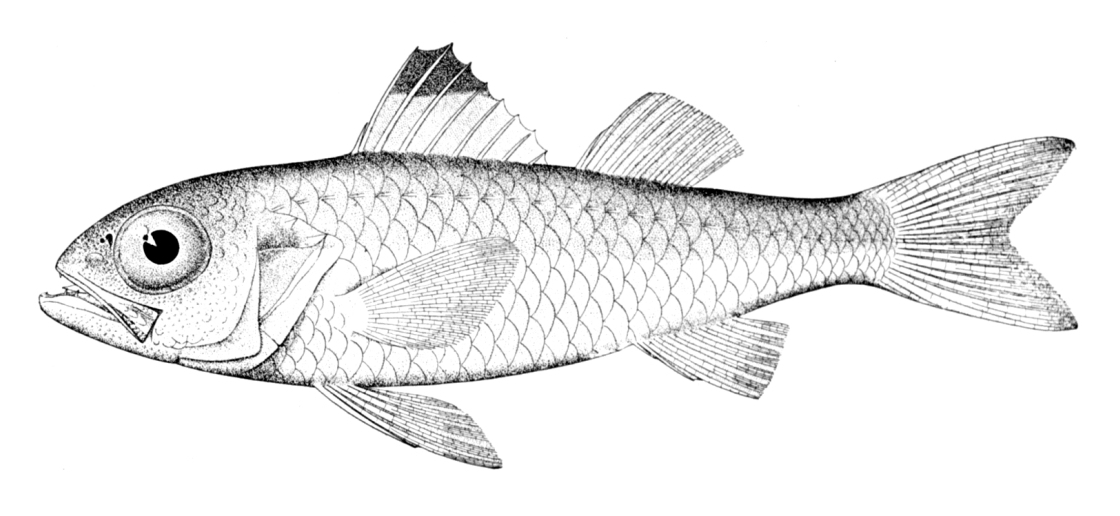

Conservation status
- Least Concern (IUCN 3.1)

Scientific classification
- Kingdom: Animalia
- Phylum: Chordata
- Class: Actinopterygii
- Order: Acropomatiformes
- Family: Synagropidae
- Genus: Synagrops
- Species: S. bellus

Binomial name
- Synagrops bellus (Goode & T. H. Bean, 1896)

Synonyms
- Hypoclydonia bella Goode & Bean, 1896

= Synagrops bellus =

Species of ray-finned fish

Synagrops bellus, the blackmouth bass, is a species of ray-finned fish in the family Synagropidae.

== Distribution ==
They can be found all around the coastal waters of the western Atlantic Ocean from Newfoundland to Argentina.

== Description ==
They have 10 dorsal spines, 9 dorsal soft rays, 2 anal spines, and 7 anal soft rays.
