= Testis-expressed protein 29 =

Protein in humans

TEX29

Identifiers
- Aliases: TEX29, C13orf16, bA474D23.1, testis expressed 29
- External IDs: GeneCards: TEX29

Gene location (Human)
Chr.	Chromosome 13 (human)
Band	13q34	Start	111,316,184 bp
Band	13q34	End	111,344,249 bp
RNA expression pattern
Bgee	Human / Mouse (ortholog); Top expressed in: left testis; testicle; right testis; sperm; right frontal lobe; Brodmann area 9; cingulate gyrus; anterior cingulate cortex; gonad; prefrontal cortex / n/a; More reference expression data
BioGPS	n/a
Orthologs
Databases	NCBI: entry; OMA: entry
Species	Human	Mouse
Entrez	121793	n/a
Ensembl	ENSG00000153495	n/a
UniProt	Q8N6K0	n/a
RefSeq (mRNA)	NM_152324; NM_001303133	n/a
RefSeq (protein)	NP_001290062; NP_689537	n/a
Location (UCSC)	Chr 13: 111.32 – 111.34 Mb	n/a
PubMed search		n/a
- Wikidata
View/Edit Human

Testis-expressed protein 29 (TEX29) is a protein that in humans is encoded by the TEX29 gene (previously C13orf16). The name refers to the high testis expression of this gene due to spermatogenesis.

C13orf16 in Homo sapiens is located on the long arm of chromosome 13 at q34. The spliced gene is 859 nucleotides, has 7 exons and is located on the plus strand.

C13orf16 is ubiquitously expressed among human tissues, with significantly higher expression in brain tissues, specifically in the hippocampus and cerebellum.

== Protein ==
The human C13orf16 protein encoded by the mRNA sequence is 174 amino acids in length. The molecular weight without post-transitional modifications is 18.4 KD and the basal isoelectric point value is 4.99 pH.

Human C13orf16 is localized both intracellularly, in the nucleus, and extracellularly with one transmembrane domain from amino acids 80-102. There are no asparagines, resulting in no N-glycosylation sites.

There are five interacting proteins for human C13orf16, all identified by physical interactions.

Interacting proteins for human C13orf16 protein
Abbreviated Name	Full Name	Brief Description
PTS	6-Pyruvoyltetrahydropterin Synthase	Elimination of inorganic triphosphate from dihydroneopterin triphosphate (2nd and irreversible step in the biosynthesis of tetrahydrobiopterin from GTP)
SLC16A2	Solute Carrier Family 16 Member 2	Non-redundant, thyroid hormone transporter
STEAP3	STEAP Family Member 3, Metalloreductase	Iron transporter, can reduce both iron (Fe3+) and copper (Cu2+) cations
SLC4A7	Solute Carrier Family 4 Member 7	Sodium bicarbonate cotransporter, transports sodium and bicarbonate ions in a 1:1 ratio, considered an electroneutral cotransporter
SLC6A15	Solute Carrier Family 6 Member 15	Neutral amino acid transporter, predicted to play a role in neuronal amino acid transport

== Homology and evolution ==
The C13orf16 protein was only found to have orthologs in placental mammals and most distantly found in the Proboscidea taxonomic group. In the table below, orthologs are sorted first by estimated date of divergence, then by sequence identity to the human C13orf16 protein.

Orthologs of human C13orf16 protein
Genus & Species	Common Name	Taxonomic Group	Date of Divergence (MYA)	Accession Number	Sequence Length (aa)	Sequence Identity to Human Protein	Sequence Similarity to Human Protein
Homo sapiens	Human	Primates	0	NP_001290062	174	100%	100%
Nomascus leucogenys	Northern Gibbon	Primates	19.5	XP_012362426	173	91%	94.80%
Macaca mulatta	Rhesus Macaque	Primates	28.8	XP_028693172	182	44.30%	51.70%
Cebus imitator	White-faced Capuchin	Primates	43	XP_037585341	179	70.60%	77.80%
Peromyscus maniculatus bairdii	Deer Mouse	Rodentia	87	XP_042118685	176	27.20%	38.60%
Peromyscus leucopus	White-Footed Mouse	Rodentia	87	XP_037067483	176	26.70%	38.60%
Oryctolagus cuniculus	European Rabbit	Lagomorpha	87	XP_051685630	143	25.80%	30.80%
Phoca vitulina	Harbor Seal	Carnivora	94	XP_032258415	162	34%	43.50%
Neofelis nebulosa	Clouded Leopard	Carnivora	94	XP_058598545	165	34.00%	45.20%
Phacochoerus africanus	Warthog	Artiodactyla	94	XP_047612273	171	32.10%	41.80%
Balaenoptera ricei	Rice's Whale	Artiodactyla	94	XP_059759229	147	29.30%	36.40%
Hyaena hyaena	Striped Hyena	Carnivora	94	XP_039082615	151	29.00%	39.40%
Ailuropoda melanoleuca	Giant Panda	Carnivora	94	XP_034521380	147	25%	31.20%
Hippopotamus amphibius kiboko	East African Hippo	Artiodactyla	94	XP_057563793	147	23.70%	34.30%
Artibeus jamaicensis	Jamaican Fruit Bat	Chiroptera	94	XP_036993559.2	149	21.70%	30.40%
Vulpes lagopus	Arctic Fox	Carnivora	94	XP_041586767	178	21.7%%	30.0%%
Equus caballus	Horse	Perissodactyla	94	XP_005601398	136	20.80%	27.00%
Talpa occidentalis	Spanish Mole	Talpidae	94	XP_037383406	162	19.30%	25.00%
Diceros bicornis minor	Black Rhino	Perissodactyla	94	XP_058403718	181	18.80%	24%
Elephas maximus indicus	Indian Elephant	Proboscidea	99	XP_049723476	145	23.80%	35.10%
