= Parascombrops analis =

Scientific classification
- Domain: Eukaryota
- Kingdom: Animalia
- Phylum: Chordata
- Class: Actinopterygii
- Order: Acropomatiformes
- Family: Synagropidae
- Genus: Parascombrops
- Species: P. analis

Binomial name
- Parascombrops analis (Katayama, 1957)

Synonyms
- Neoscombrops analis Katayama, 1957; Synagrops analis; (Katayama, 1957)

Species of ray-finned fish

Parascombrops analis, the threespine seabass, is a species of ray-finned fish in the family Synagropidae.

== Distribution ==
They can be found in the Northwestern Pacific off southern Japan, Taiwan and the northern Philippines and Southwestern Pacific from the Coral Sea to Vanuatu.
