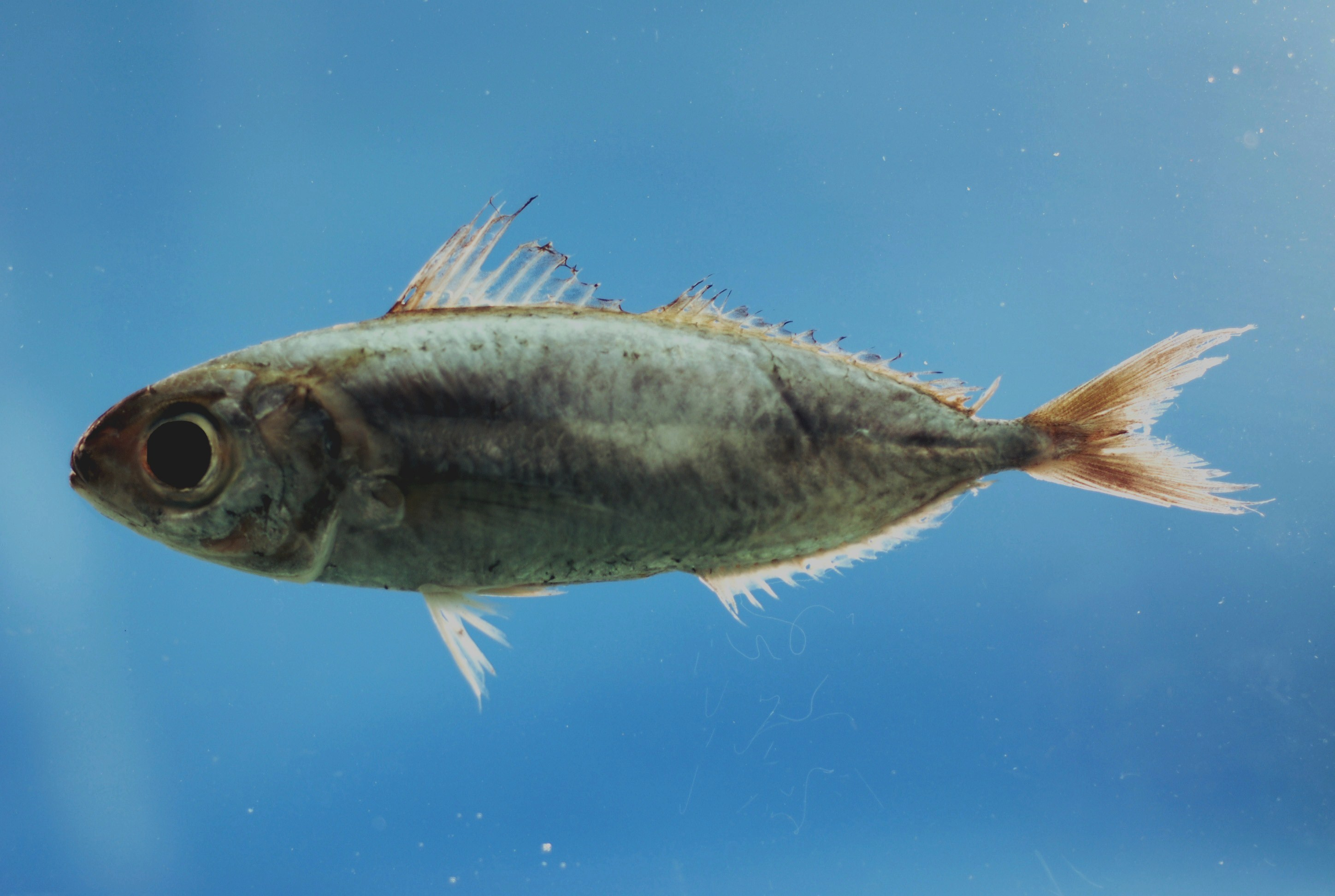
- Silver-rag driftfish (A. bondi)

Scientific classification
- Kingdom: Animalia
- Phylum: Chordata
- Class: Actinopterygii
- Division: Teleostei
- Order: Scombriformes
- Suborder: Stromateoidei
- Family: Ariommatidae
- Genus: Ariomma; Jordan & Snyder, 1904

Type species
- Ariomma lurida Jordan & Snyder 1904

Species
- See text for species

= Ariomma =

Ariomma Temporal range: Late Miocene to present

Genus of ray-finned fishes

Ariomma is a genus of deepwater, marine ray-finned fishes belonging to the family Ariommatidae. Members of this genus are found in the Atlantic, Pacific and Indian Oceans. Several members of this genus are of commercial importance as food fish. This genus is currently the only known extant genus in its family.

== Species ==
Currently, the 7 recognized species in this genus are:

- Ariomma bondi Fowler, 1930 (silver-rag driftfish)
- Ariomma brevimanus (Klunzinger, 1884)
- Ariomma indica (F. Day, 1871) (Indian driftfish)
- Ariomma lurida D. S. Jordan & Snyder, 1904 (ariommid)
- Ariomma melana (Ginsburg, 1954) (Brown driftfish)
- Ariomma parini Piotrovsky, 1987 (Parin's ariomma)
- Ariomma regulus (Poey, 1868) (spotted driftfish)

The only known fossil species is †Ariomma geslini Carnevale & Bannkov, 2006 from the latest Miocene (Messinian) of Algeria, although the earlier genus Isurichthys has sometimes been lumped into it.
