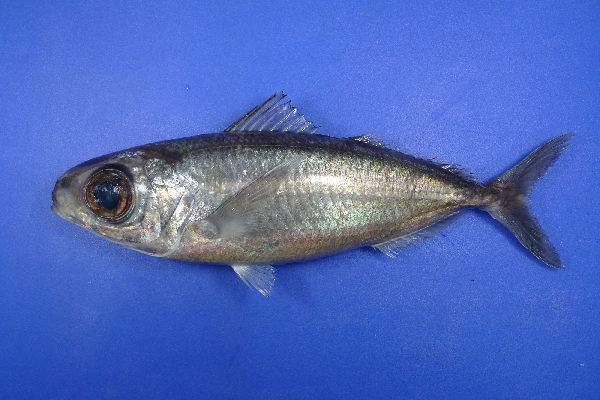
- Ariomma lurida

Scientific classification
- Kingdom: Animalia
- Phylum: Chordata
- Class: Actinopterygii
- Division: Teleostei
- Order: Scombriformes
- Suborder: Stromateoidei
- Family: Ariommatidae; Haedrich, 1967

Genera
- See text

= Ariommatidae =

Ariommatidae Temporal range: Early Oligocene–present

Family of ray-finned fishes

Ariommatidae is a family of marine ray-finned fishes which are classified within the suborder Stromateoidei of the order Scombriformes.

== Genera ==
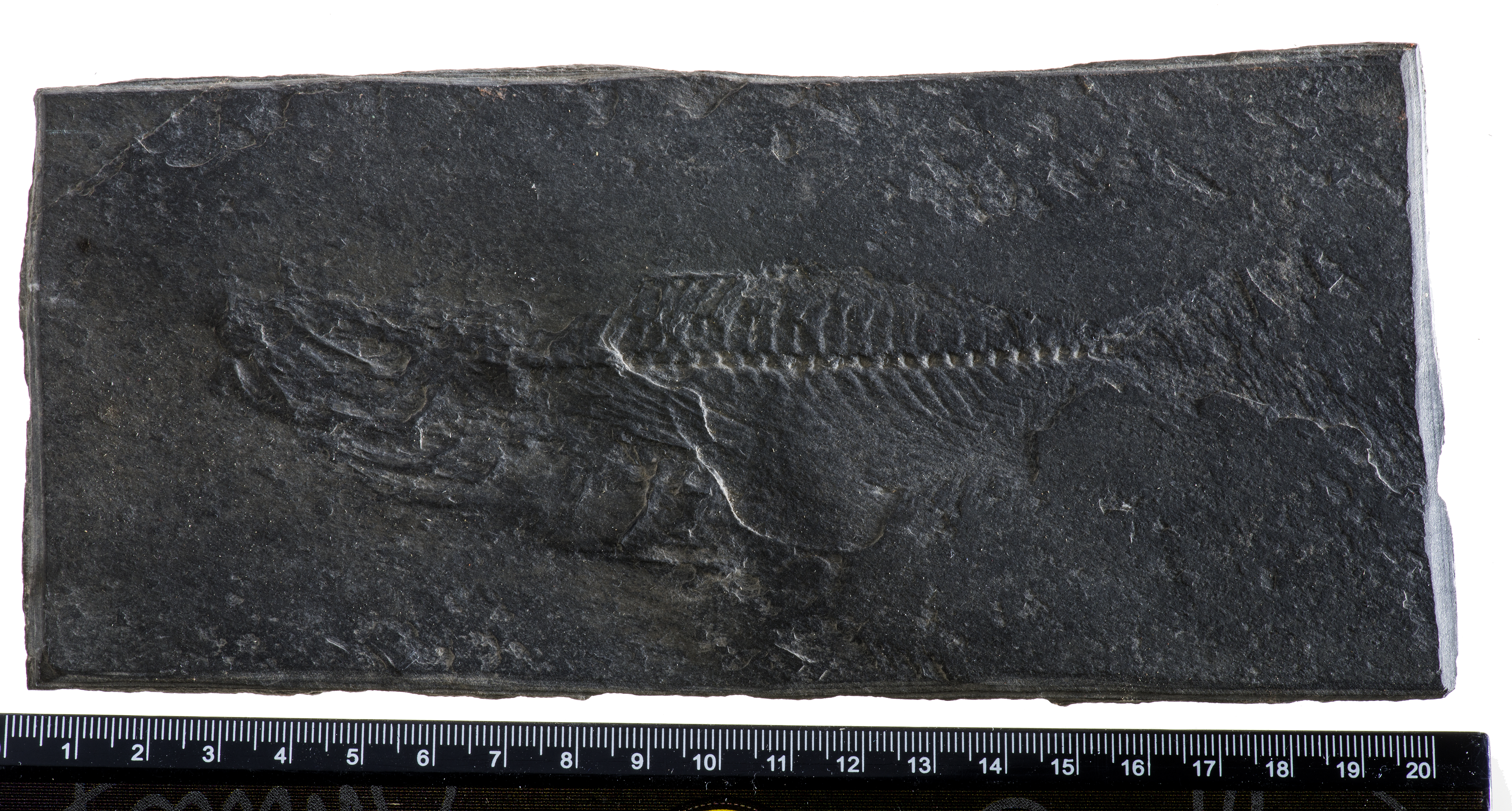
Fossil specimen of Isurichthys macrurus

Ariommatidae contains one extant genus and one known extinct genus:

- Ariomma Jordan & Snyder, 1904
- †Isurichthys Woodward, 1901

The extinct genus Cubariomma from the early Oligocene of the North Caucasus may be either an ariommatid or a nomeid.
