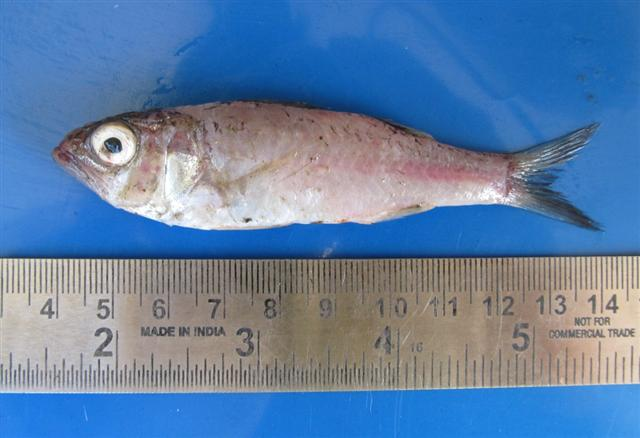
- Parascombrops philippinensis

Scientific classification
- Kingdom: Animalia
- Phylum: Chordata
- Class: Actinopterygii
- Order: Acropomatiformes
- Family: Synagropidae
- Genus: Parascombrops; Alcock, 1889

Type species
- Parascombrops pellucidus Alcock, 1889

= Parascombrops =

Genus of ray-finned fishes

Paracombrops is a genus of marine ray-finned fishes from the family Synagropidae. The fish in this genus are found in the Indo-Pacific.

== Species ==
The following species are classified within this genus:

- Parascombrops analis (Katayama, 1957) (Threespine seabass)
- Parascombrops argyreus (Gilbert & Cramer, 1897)
- Parascombrops glossodon Schwarzhans & Prokofiev, 2017
- Parascombrops madagascariensis Schwarzhans & Prokofiev 2017
- Parascombrops mochizukii Schwarzhans, Prokofiev & Ho, 2017
- Parascombrops nakayamai Schwarzhans & Prokofiev, 2017
- Parascombrops ohei Schwarzhans & Prokofiev, 2017
- Parascombrops parvidens Schwarzhans & Prokofiev, 2017
- Parascombrops pellucidus Alcock, 1889
- Parascombrops philippinensis Günther, 1880 (Sharptooth seabass)
- Parascombrops serratospinosus (H.M. Smith & Radcliffe, 1912) (Roughspine seabass)
- Parascombrops spinosus (Schultz, 1940) (Keelcheek bass)
- Parascombrops yamanouei Schwarzhans, Prokofiev & Ho, 2017
