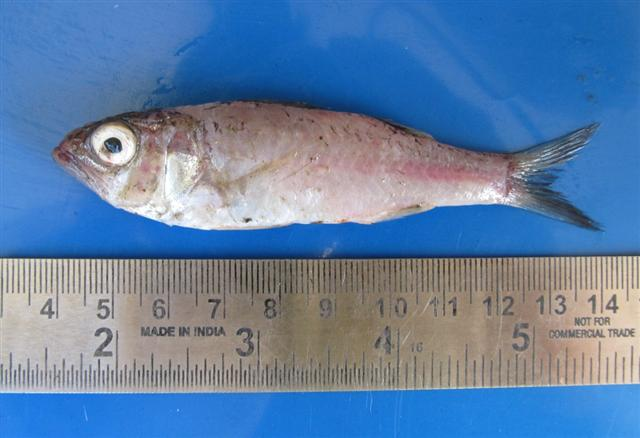

Scientific classification
- Domain: Eukaryota
- Kingdom: Animalia
- Phylum: Chordata
- Class: Actinopterygii
- Order: Acropomatiformes
- Family: Synagropidae
- Genus: Parascombrops
- Species: P. philippinensis

Binomial name
- Parascombrops philippinensis Günther, 1880

Synonyms
- Acropoma philippinense Günther, 1880; Synagrops philippinensis (Günther, 1880); Synagrops malayanus Weber, 1913

= Parascombrops philippinensis =

Species of ray-finned fish

Parascombrops philippinensis, the sharptooth seabass, is a species of ray-finned fish in the family Synagropidae. It usually inhabits a depth of 180–220 metres and lives in and around the Indian Ocean and the Pacific Ocean, where it reaches a length of around 13 centimetres.
