= Three-spine bass =

Scientific classification
- Kingdom: Animalia
- Phylum: Chordata
- Class: Actinopterygii
- Order: Acropomatiformes
- Family: Synagropidae
- Genus: Caraibops; Schwarzhans & Prokofiev, 2017
- Species: C. trispinosus

Binomial name
- Caraibops trispinosus (Mochizuki and Sano, 1984)

Synonyms
- Synagrops trispinosus Mochizuki & Sano, 1984

Species of ray-finned fish

The three-spine bass (Caraibops trispinosus) is a species of ray-finned fish from the family Synagropidae. It is a deep water species which is found in the western Atlantic from the northeastern Gulf of Mexico to Surinam. This fish was first formally described in 1984 as Synagrops trispinosus but in 2017 was placed in the monotypic genus Caraibops.
