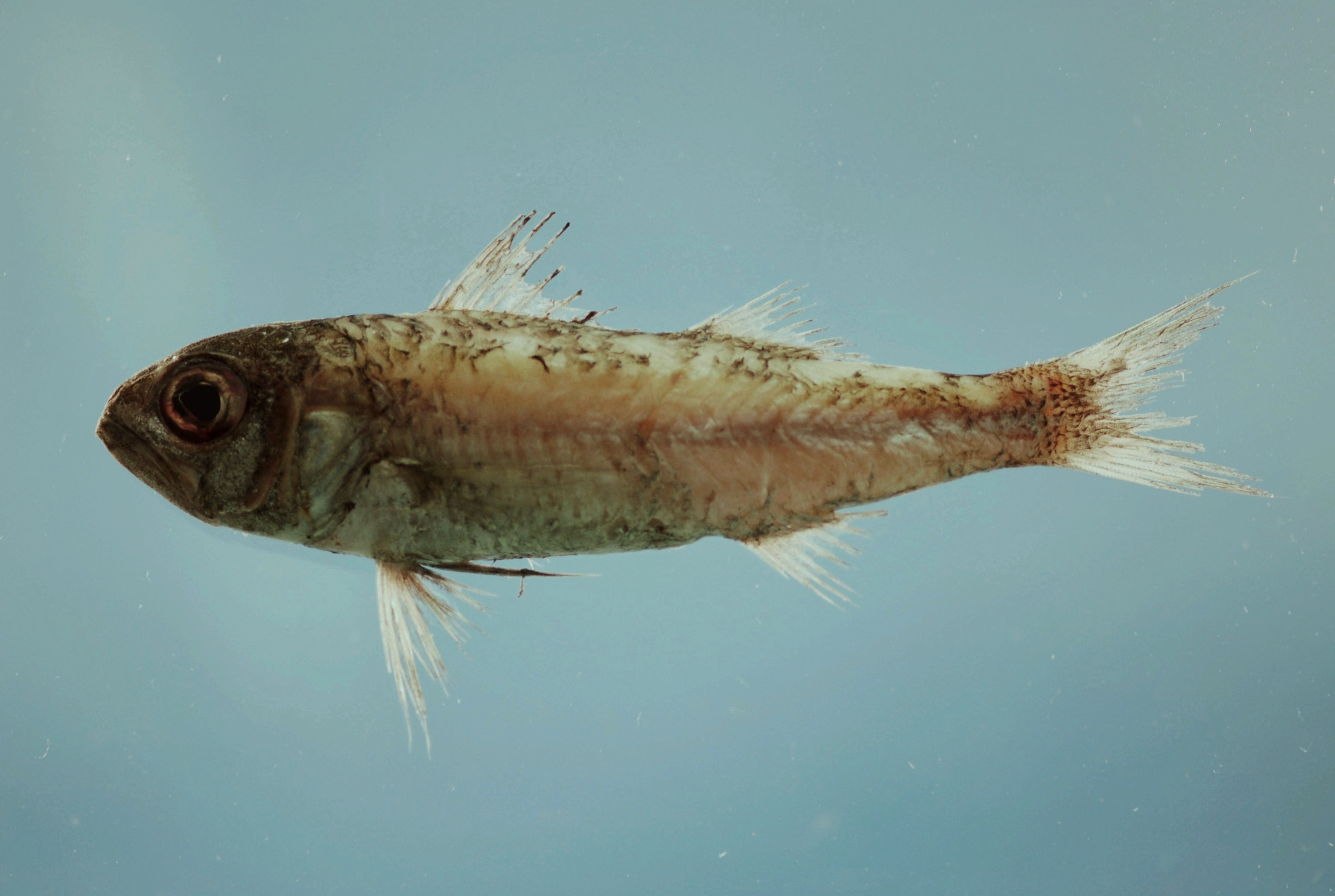
- Synagrops bellus

Scientific classification
- Kingdom: Animalia
- Phylum: Chordata
- Class: Actinopterygii
- Order: Acropomatiformes
- Family: Synagropidae
- Genus: Synagrops; Günther, 1887

Type species
- Melanostoma japonicum Döderlein, 1883

= Synagrops =

Genus of ray-finned fishes

Synagrops is a genus of ray-finned fishes native to the Indian, Atlantic and Pacific oceans.

== Species ==
There are currently 3 recognized species in this genus:

- Synagrops atrumoris Mediodia & Lin, 2024 (Dongsha blackmouth splitfin)
- Synagrops bellus (Goode & T. H. Bean, 1896) (Blackmouth bass)
- Synagrops japonicus (Döderlein (de), 1883) (Blackmouth splitfin)
