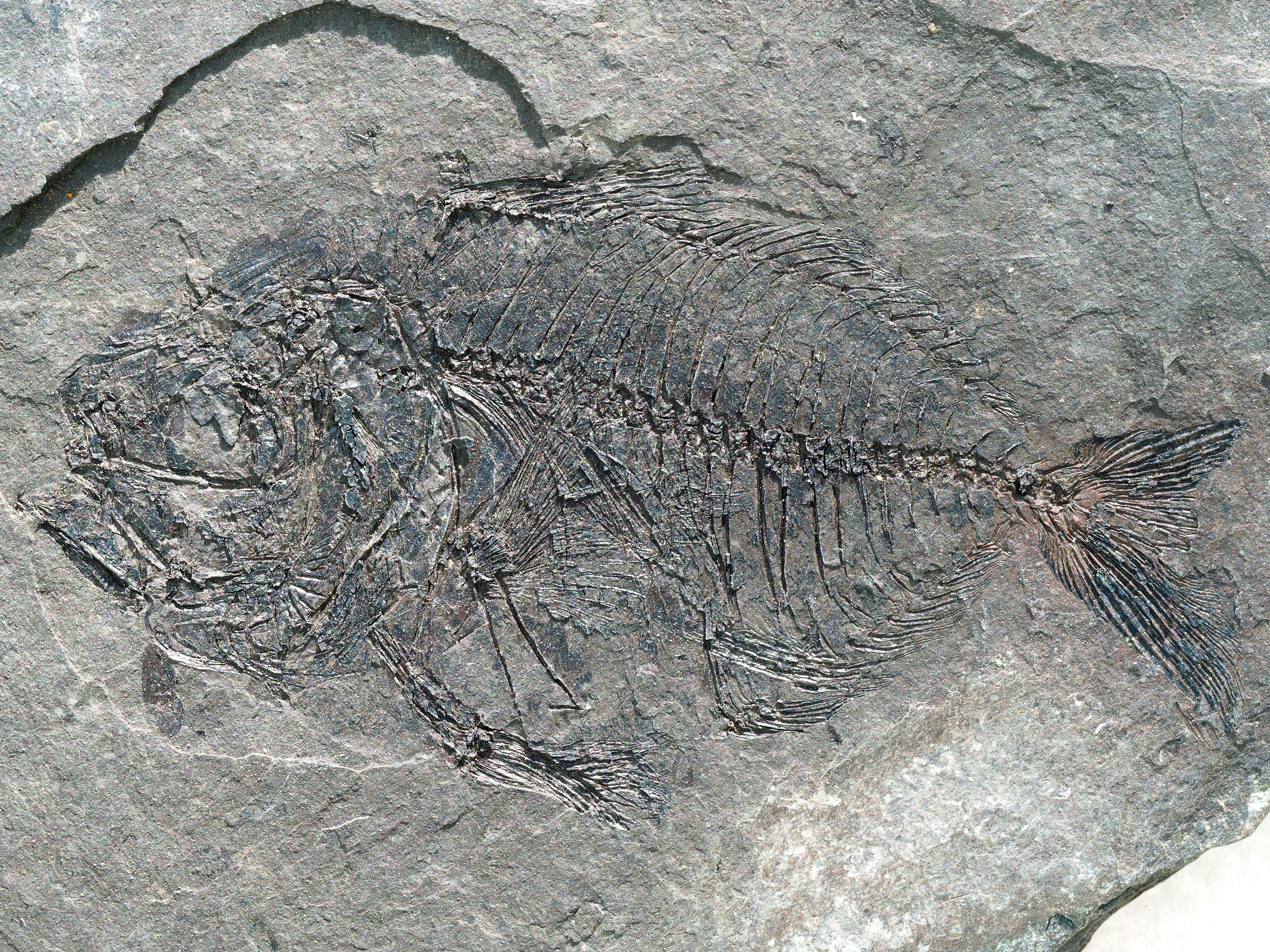
- †Isurichthys cf. roumanus Baciu and Bannikov 2004 from the Oligocene of Jamna Dolna, Poland

Scientific classification
- Kingdom: Animalia
- Phylum: Chordata
- Class: Actinopterygii
- Division: Teleostei
- Order: Scombriformes
- Family: Ariommatidae
- Genus: †Isurichthys; Woodward, 1901

Type species
- †Isurus macrurus Agassiz, 1844

Synonyms
- Isurus Agassiz, 1842

= Isurichthys =

Isurichthys Temporal range: Early Oligocene

Extinct genus of fishes

Isurichthys is an extinct genus of prehistoric marine ray-finned fish from the Oligocene of Europe, belonging to the family Ariommatidae. They were initially placed in the family Scombridae. The genus was described in 1901 by Woodward to replace the genus name Isurus Agassiz, 1844, preoccupied by the genus of mako sharks.

== Species ==
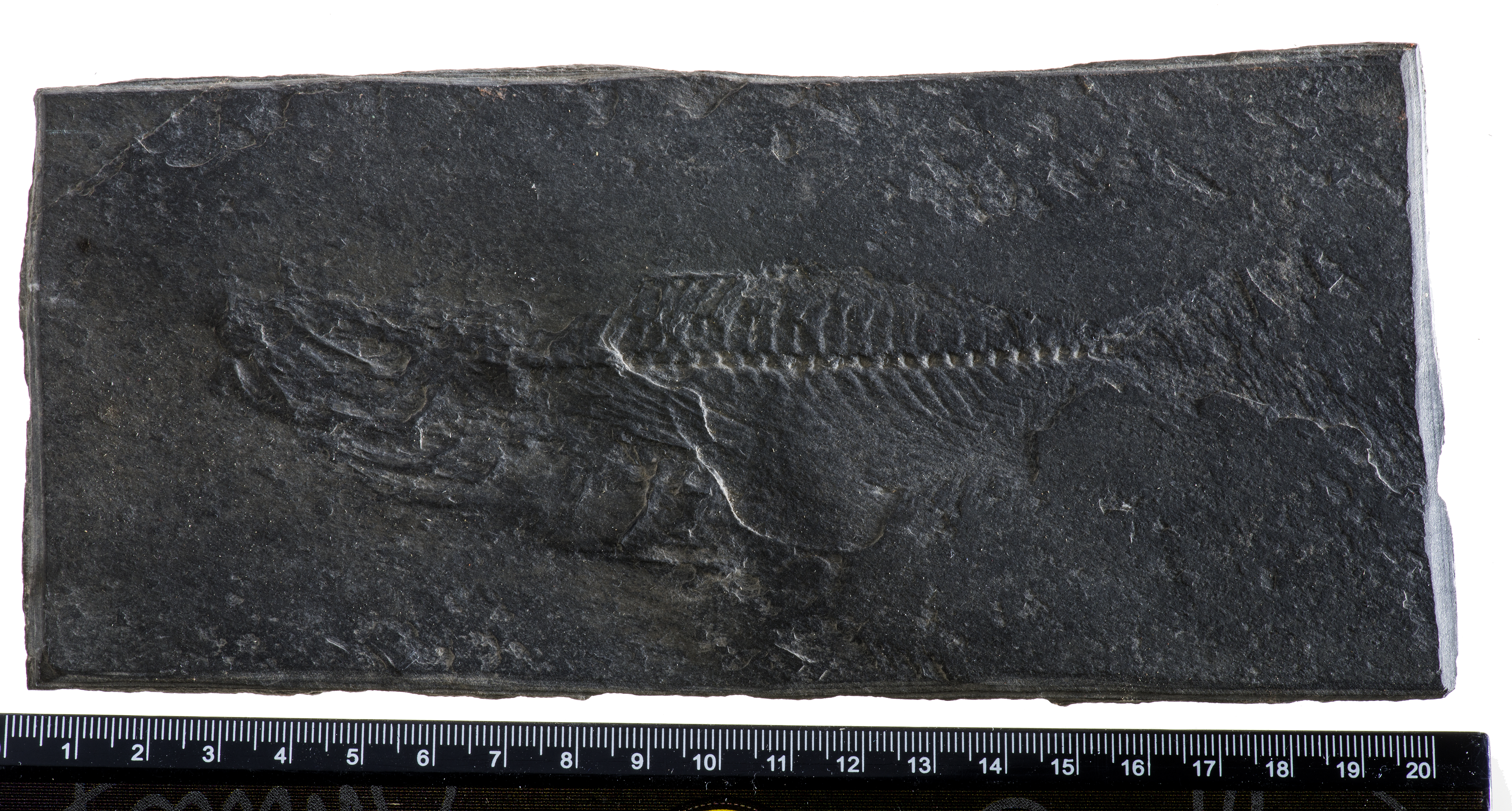
Fossil specimen of I. macrurus

Three species have been classified within the genus Isurichthys:

- †I. breviusculus Bannikov, 2012 - Early Oligocene of North Caucasus, Russia (Pshekha Formation)
- †I. macrurus (Agassiz, 1844) - Early Oligocene of Switzerland (Matt Formation)
- †I. roumanus Baciu & Bannikov, 2004 - Early Oligocene of Romania

An indeterminate species is also known from the Early Oligocene of the Ukrainian Carpathians. Another species described in the genus by Woodward, 'I.' orientalis from Iran, was identified by Bannikov (2012) as being a driftfish in the family Nomeidae, and reclassified into the fossil nomeid genus Rybapina.
