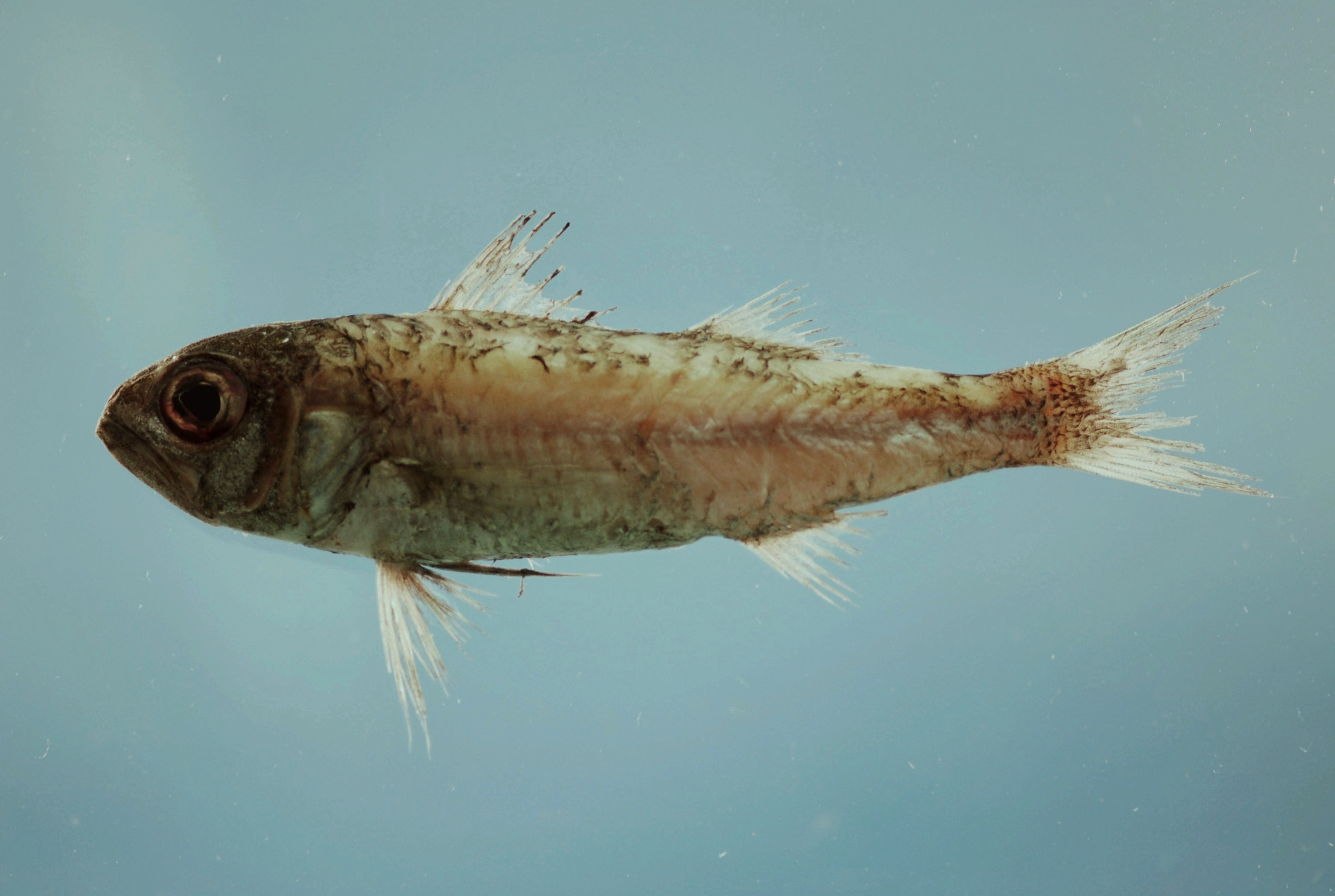
- Synagrops bellus

Scientific classification
- Kingdom: Animalia
- Phylum: Chordata
- Class: Actinopterygii
- Order: Acropomatiformes
- Family: Synagropidae; Smith, 1961

Genera
- See text

= Synagropidae =

Synagropidae Temporal range: Bartonian–present

Family of ray-finned fishes

Synagropidae is a small family of ray-finned fishes, sometimes known as the splitfin ocean-basses, in the order Acropomatiformes. Its members were formerly included in the lanternbelly family Acropomatidae.

== Genera ==
The following genera are included in the family:

- Caraibops Prokofiev & Schwarzhans, 2017
- Kaperangus Prokofiev & Schwarzhans, 2017
- Parascombrops Alcock, 1889
- Synagrops Günther, 1887

A close relative, the fossil genus †Synagropoides Bannikov, 2002 is known from the Middle Eocene of the North Caucasus, Russia.
