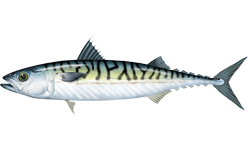
- Atlantic mackerel, Scomber scombrus

Scientific classification
- Domain: Eukaryota
- Kingdom: Animalia
- Phylum: Chordata
- Class: Actinopterygii
- Order: Scombriformes
- Family: Scombridae
- Subfamily: Scombrinae
- Tribe: Scombrini; Bonaparte, 1831

Genera
- Scomber Linnaeus, 1758; Rastrelliger Jordan & Starks in Jordan & Dickerson, 1908

= Scombrini =

True mackerels

Tribe of fishes

Scombrini, commonly called the true mackerels, is a tribe of ray-finned bony fishes in the mackerel family, Scombridae – a family it shares with the Spanish mackerel, tuna and bonito tribes, plus the butterfly kingfish.

== Genera ==
This tribe consists of seven species in two genera:

- Scomber Linnaeus, 1758
  - Scomber australasicus Cuvier, 1832, Blue mackerel
  - Scomber colias Gmelin, 1789, Atlantic chub mackerel
  - Scomber japonicus, Houttuyn, 1782, Chub mackerel
  - Scomber scombrus Linnaeus, 1758, Atlantic mackerel

- Rastrelliger Jordan & Starks in Jordan & Dickerson, 1908
  - Rastrelliger brachysoma (Bleeker, 1851), Short mackerel
  - Rastrelliger faughni Matsui, 1967, Island mackerel
  - Rastrelliger kanagurta (Cuvier, 1816), Indian mackerel

== See also ==
- Mackerel as food
