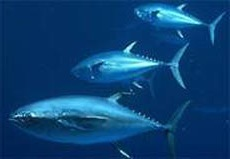
- Thunnus thynnus, Atlantic bluefin tuna

Scientific classification
- Kingdom: Animalia
- Phylum: Chordata
- Class: Actinopterygii
- Division: Teleostei
- Order: Scombriformes
- Suborder: Scombroidei
- Family: Scombridae
- Subfamily: Scombrinae; Bonaparte, 1831

Type species
- Scomber scombrus Linnaeus, 1758

Tribes
- Sardini – bonitos; Scomberomorini – Spanish mackerels; Scombrini – mackerels; Thunnini – tunas

= Scombrinae =

Scombrinae Temporal range: Early Paleocene to present

Subfamily of fishes

The Scombrinae are a subfamily of ray-finned bony fishes in the family Scombridae. Of the 51 species in the Scombridae, 50 are in Scombrinae – with the sole exception being the butterfly kingfish, which is placed in the monospecific subfamily Gasterochismatinae.

== Classification ==
The Scombrinae, therefore, comprise 50 extant species in 14 genera, grouped into four tribes:

Subfamily Scombrinae

- Tribe Scombrini – mackerels
  - Genus Rastrelliger
  - Genus Scomber
- Tribe Scomberomorini – Spanish mackerels
  - Genus Acanthocybium
  - Genus Grammatorcynus
  - Genus Scomberomorus
- Tribe Sardini – bonitos
  - Genus Sarda
  - Genus Cybiosarda
  - Genus Gymnosarda
  - Genus Orcynopsis
- Tribe Thunnini – tunas
  - Genus Allothunnus
  - Genus Auxis
  - Genus Euthynnus
  - Genus Katsuwonus
  - Genus Thunnus
- Tribe †Eocoelopomini
  - Genus †Eocoelopoma (early Eocene of England & Turkmenistan)
  - Genus ?†Landanichthys (middle Paleocene of Angola)
  - Genus †Palaeothunnus (early Eocene of Turkmenistan)
  - Genus †Micrornatus (early Eocene of England)

== See also ==
- Mackerel as food
