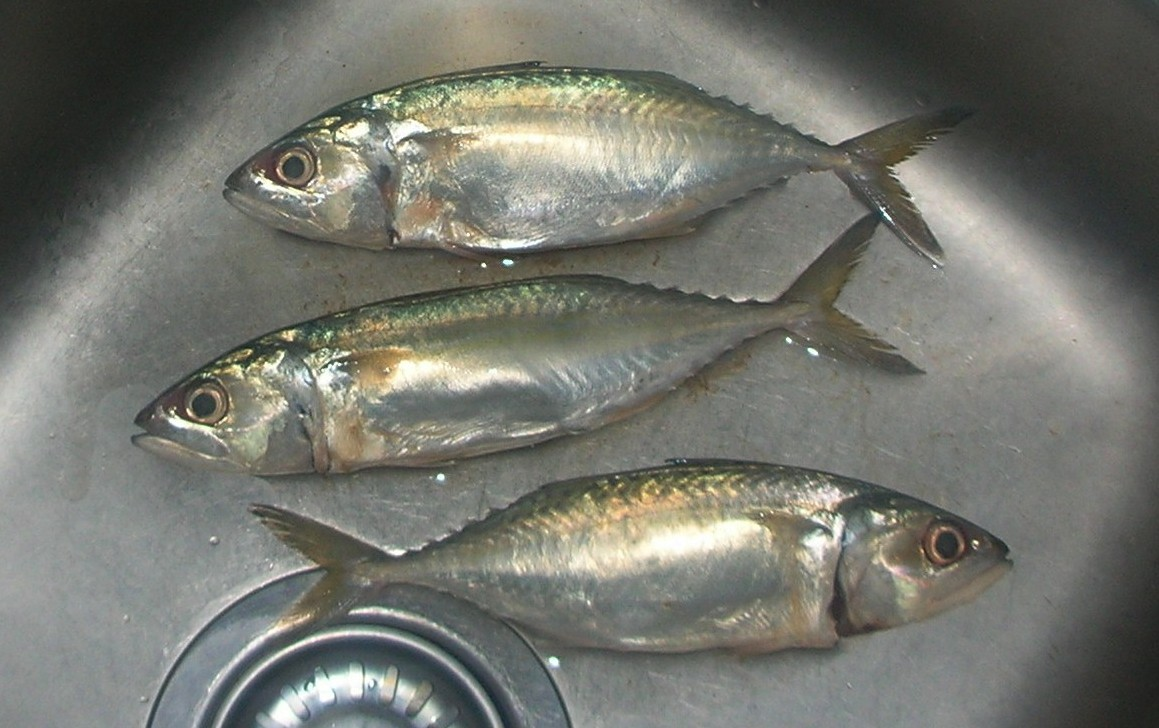

Conservation status
- Vulnerable (IUCN 3.1)

Scientific classification
- Kingdom: Animalia
- Phylum: Chordata
- Class: Actinopterygii
- Division: Teleostei
- Order: Scombriformes
- Family: Scombridae
- Genus: Rastrelliger
- Species: R. brachysoma

Binomial name
- Rastrelliger brachysoma (Bleeker, 1851)

Synonyms
- Scomber brachysoma Bleeker, 1851; Scomber neglectus van Kampen, 1907; Rastrelliger neglectus (van Kampen, 1907)

= Short mackerel =

Species of fish

The short mackerel or short-bodied mackerel (Rastrelliger brachysoma) is a species of mackerel in the family Scombridae. Its habitat is the shallow waters of Southeast Asia and Melanesia, feeding mainly on small zooplankton. It is of major importance to the fisheries industry.

== Description ==
The short mackerel can attain a maximum length of 34.5 cm, but lengths of around 20 cm are more common. It reaches maturity at a length of about 17 cm. The species has the typical appearance of a medium-sized mackerel and is of silver colour. The snout is somewhat pointed.

== Ecology ==
The short mackerel is pelagic but prefers to feed in estuarine habitats, at surface temperatures of 20–30 °C (68–86 °F). It is a plankton feeder. The spawning season can extend from March to September, with individual populations spawning in batches.

== Fisheries ==
The species is of major commercial importance, and is caught by various methods ranging from gillnetting to dynamite fishing.

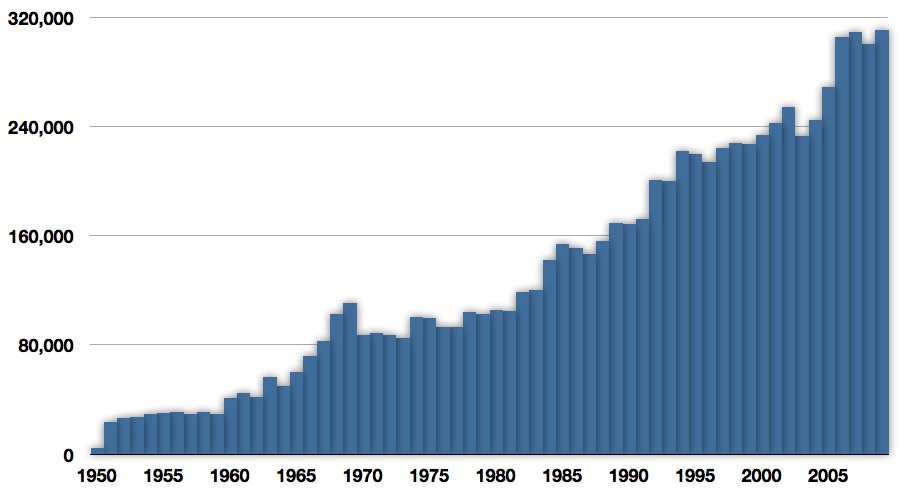
Commercial capture of short mackerel in tonnes from 1950 to 2009

== As food ==
=== Thailand ===
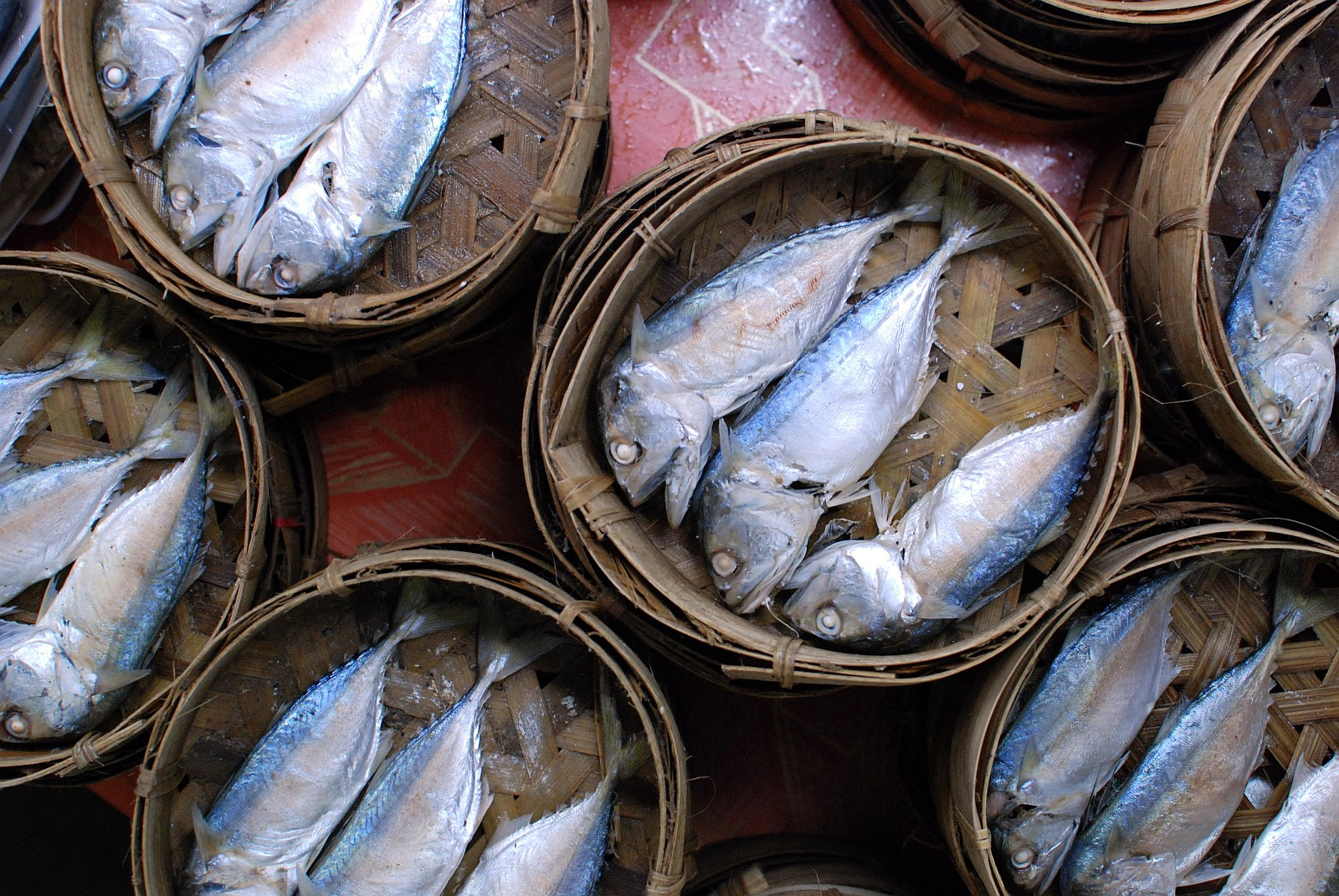
Steamed and salted pla thu sold at Thanin market in Chiang Mai, Thailand

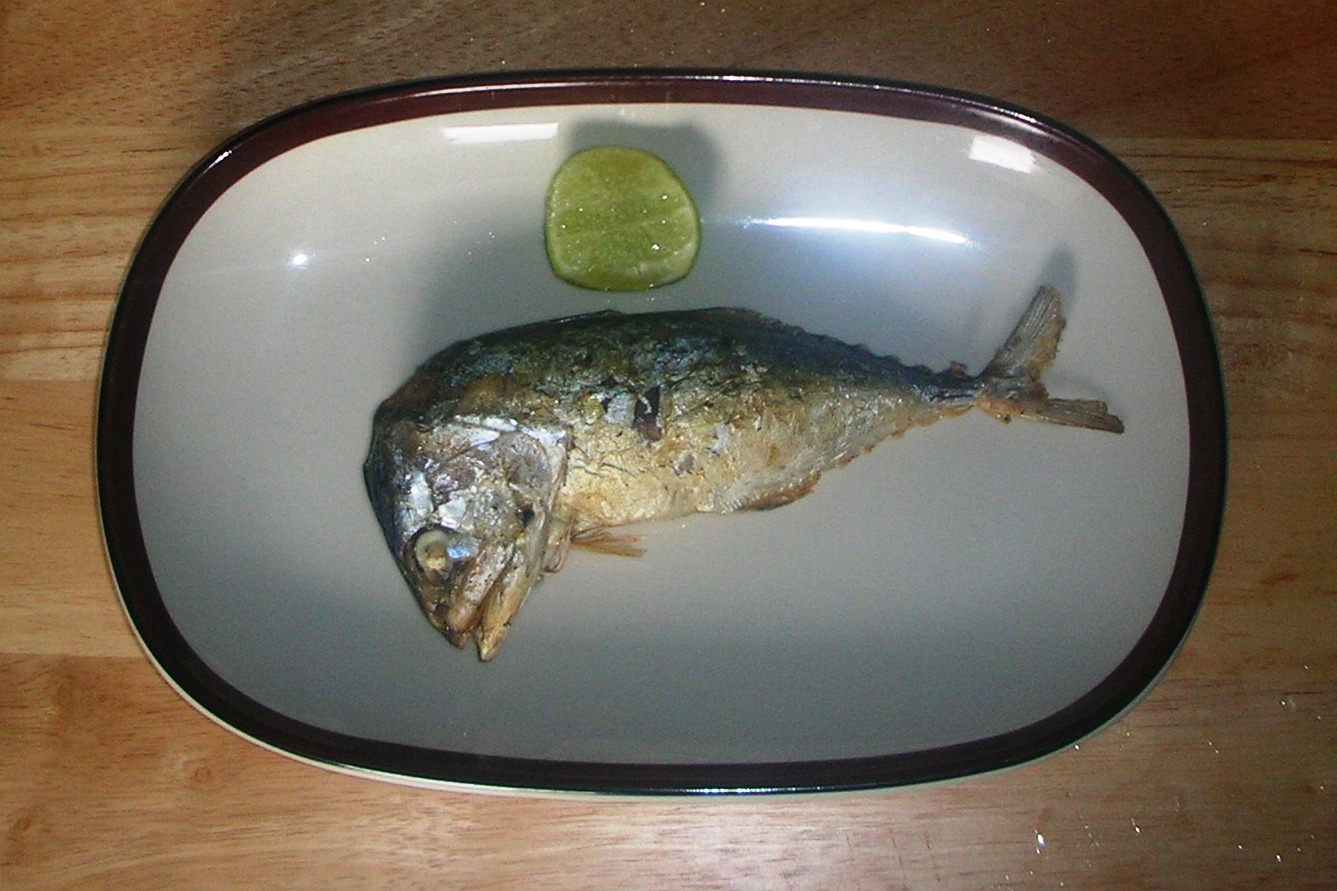
Ready-to-eat pla thu

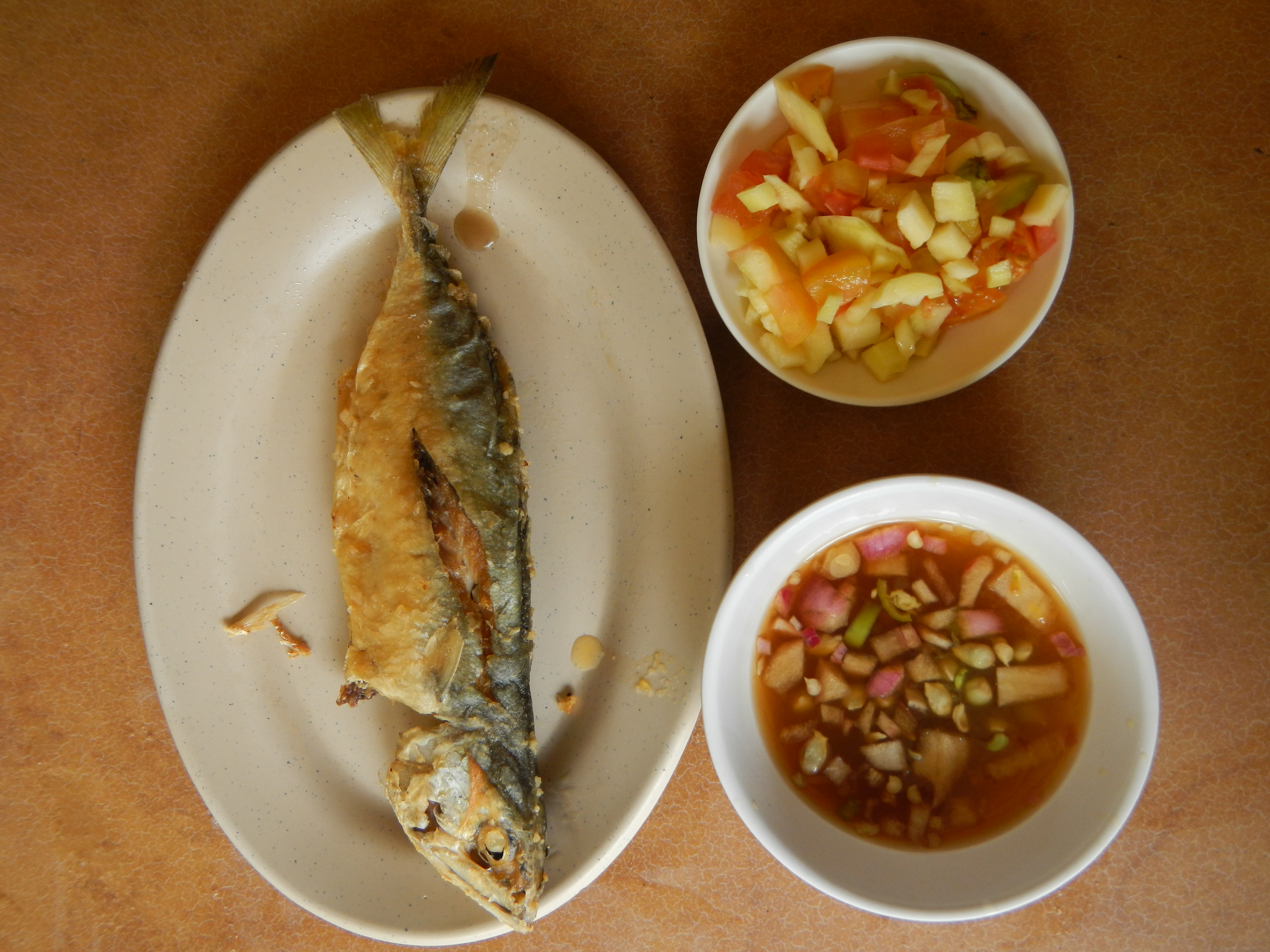
Fried short-bodied mackerel (hasa-hasa, with tomato-mango and vinegar-onion sauces, the Philippines)

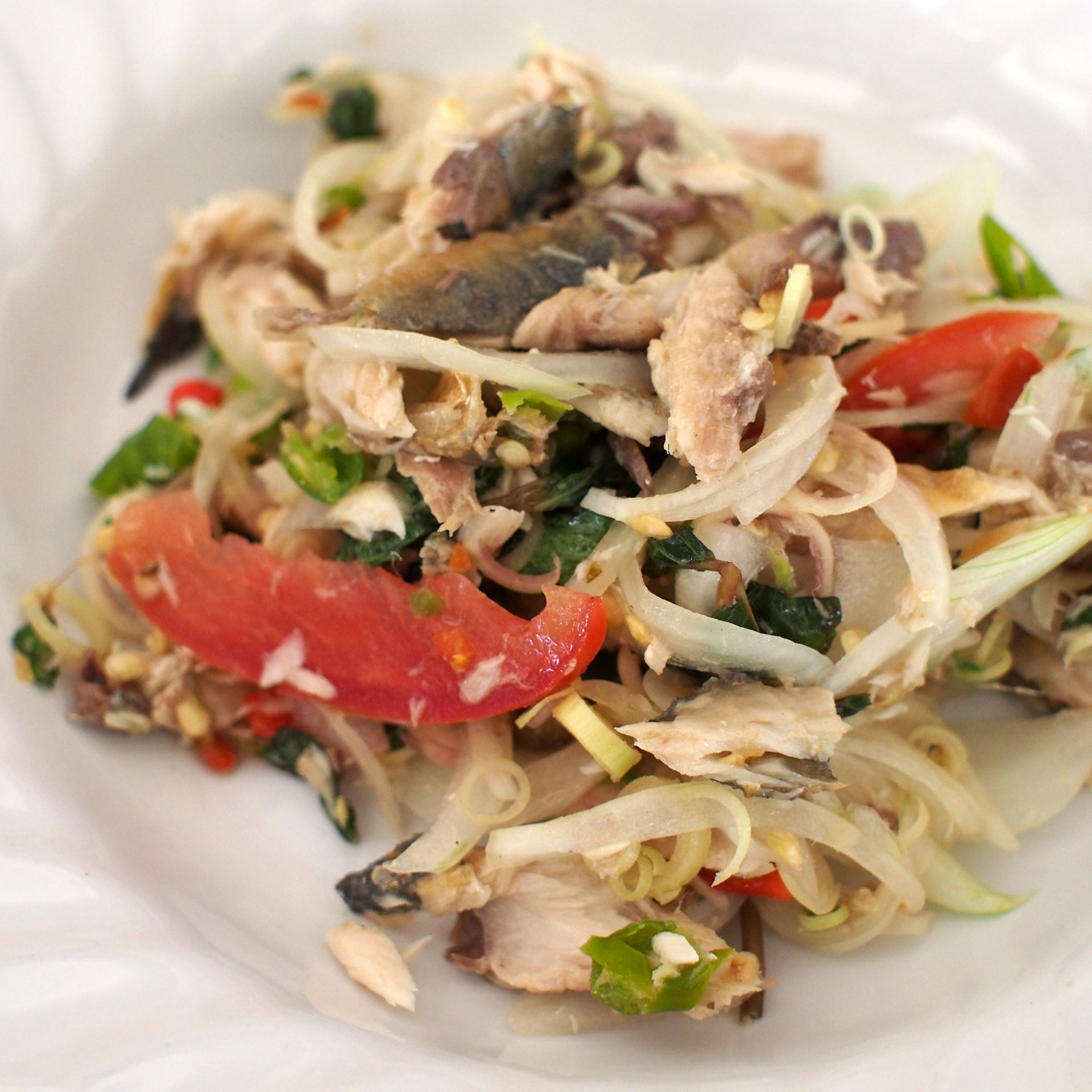
Yam pla thu is a Thai salad made with short mackerel.

Pla thu (Thai: ปลาทู; RTGS: pla thu), known as the "fish of the nation" due to its ubiquity, is a very important fish in Thai cuisine, where it is sold in the market with the head bent downwards, which gives it a characteristic shape. Pla thu is typically fried and eaten with nam phrik kapi, boiled and raw vegetables and leafy greens, as well as pieces of cha-om omelette, but it is essential in many other preparations. The name pla thu is sometimes also applied to the Indian mackerel (Rastrelliger kanagurta), which is prepared in the same way.

In the traditional way of processing the pla thu for preservation, the gills are removed and the head of the fish is bent downwards forcefully towards the belly by breaking its backbone. This is done to allow three fish to fit into a small open-work bamboo basket of a predetermined size. Once in the baskets, the fish are boiled for a few minutes in large basins of sea-water with salt added at 1 kg (2.2 lb) of salt for every 4 litres (0.88 imp gal; 1.1 US gal) of water. In Thai cuisine, the thus processed pla thu is most often eaten fried in combination with nam phrik kapi, a spicy dip made with shrimp paste, dried prawns, lime juice, fish sauce, and the small pea eggplant, with rice and steamed, raw, or fried vegetables.

The pla thu prepared in this way will keep for a very long time in the refrigerator. In former times, it kept for about two weeks without refrigeration as long as it was boiled for a few minutes every two days. In this manner, this sea fish could reach many places in interior Thailand, like the Chiang Mai area in the far north and even remote places in Isan.

Fresh pla thu is commonly used to make soups such as tom yam pla thu. This fish is so popular in Thai culture that the Samut Songkhram F.C. has a pla thu in its emblem.

In 1870, Anna Leonowens described the importance of this fish for Thailand in her book The English Governess at the Siamese Court: "The stream is rich in fish of excellent quality and flavour, such as is found in most of the great rivers of Asia; and is especially noted for its plathu, a kind of sardine, so abundant and cheap that it forms a common seasoning to the labourer's bowl of rice. The Siamese are experts in modes of drying and salting fish of all kinds, and large quantities are exported annually to Java, Sumatra, Malacca, and China". The entrails of this mackerel are one of the main ingredients of tai pla sauce, used in the preparation of the well-known kaeng tai pla curry.

Originally, pla thu was seen as food for the poor in the Siamese perspective. Later, during King Rama V's reign, the Mae Klong railway line was built, connecting Samut Sakhon (Note: Samut Sakhon was the first province in Thailand to operate pla thu fishing boats.) and Samut Songkhram to Bangkok. These two provinces had the country's largest pla thu fisheries. As a result, large quantities of pla thu were transported to Bangkok and distributed to other regions, making the fish more accessible to people in various parts of the country, including Isan. There is also evidence that King Rama V was fond of pla thu, as seen in a photo of him frying pla thu at Dusit Palace. He personally cooked dishes using pla thu as a main ingredient on many occasions. For this reason, pla thu gained cultural elevation.

Thailand's National Fisheries Association warned in 2019 that short-bodied mackerel may go extinct in the Gulf of Thailand unless action is taken. The Thai Department of Fisheries closes the upper part of the Gulf of Thailand annually during the short mackerel breeding season. The fish migrate from the south of the gulf to the north to find spawning grounds. During this period, fishing boats are not allowed in specific areas. Local fishers flout this ban by catching adult female fish during their breeding season, reducing the number of newly spawned fish. In 2011, the pla thu catch in Thai waters was 147,853 tonnes. By 2018, the figure had dropped to 20,461 tonnes. Formerly rich seas off Mae Klong (Samut Songkhram Province) are now home to few fish. Imports from Sri Lanka and Indonesia have become increasingly common, although Thais commonly believe that imported mackerel is inferior in flavour.

=== In other countries ===
This type of mackerel is also very important in the cuisine of other regions of Southeast Asia, such as Cambodia, the Philippines (where it is the most commercially important variety of mackerel), and Malaysia.
