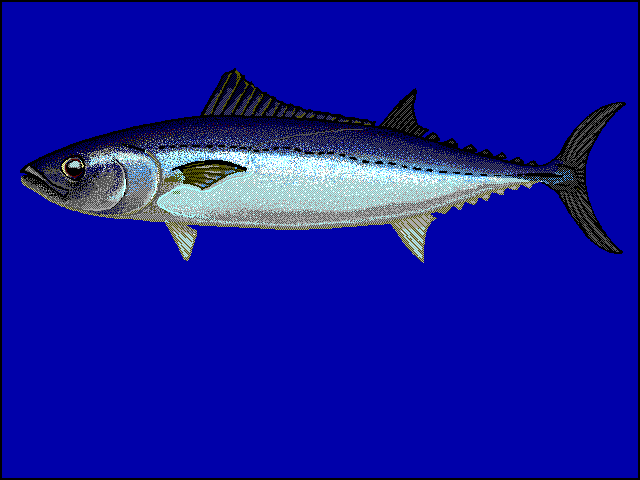

Conservation status
- Least Concern (IUCN 3.1)

Scientific classification
- Kingdom: Animalia
- Phylum: Chordata
- Class: Actinopterygii
- Division: Teleostei
- Order: Scombriformes
- Family: Scombridae
- Subfamily: Scombrinae
- Tribe: Thunnini
- Genus: Allothunnus
- Species: A. fallai

Binomial name
- Allothunnus fallai Serventy, 1948

Synonyms
- Gasterochisma fallai (Serventy, 1948)

= Slender tuna =

Species of fish

The slender tuna, Allothunnus fallai, is a species of tuna, the only species in the genus Allothunnus, found around the world in the southern oceans between latitudes 20° and 50° South, although there are two records of probable vagrants, one in Los Angeles Harbour and the other from the North Pacific subarctic gyre. It has a more elongated body than other species of tuna with which it is symaptric such as the albacore The colour is blue-black on the back with silvery greyish-white sides, however some individuals have a coppery sheen soon after capture. It has a small second dorsal and anal fins resembling a small albacore, but the slender tuna lacks the long sweeping pectoral fins characteristic of albacores. The pectoral fins and pelvic fins are purple on their distal portions and black near their bases. Its length is up to 1 metre (3.3 ft) and it can weigh up to 12 kilograms (26 lb). It occasionally forms schools and its main prey is krill but it is also known to prey on squid and smaller fishes, such as jack mackerel. It is a species of minor commercial importance, taken mainly as bycatch by fisheries for other tuna species. It has rather oily flesh, paler than that of other tuna, but the flesh is palatable when cooked, although it is suitable for canning. The high oil content of the flesh is caused by the oily nature of its diet and varies over the tuna's life, fish which have just fed are high in oil but specimens caught at the end of their migrations will have relatively low oil content. The high concentration of omega-3 polyunsaturated fatty acids in the flesh of this species caused the CSIRO to declare that the slender tuna was Australia's healthiest seafood dish.
