= Kaeng tai pla =

Southern Thai curry, made with a salty sauce made from fermented fish entrails

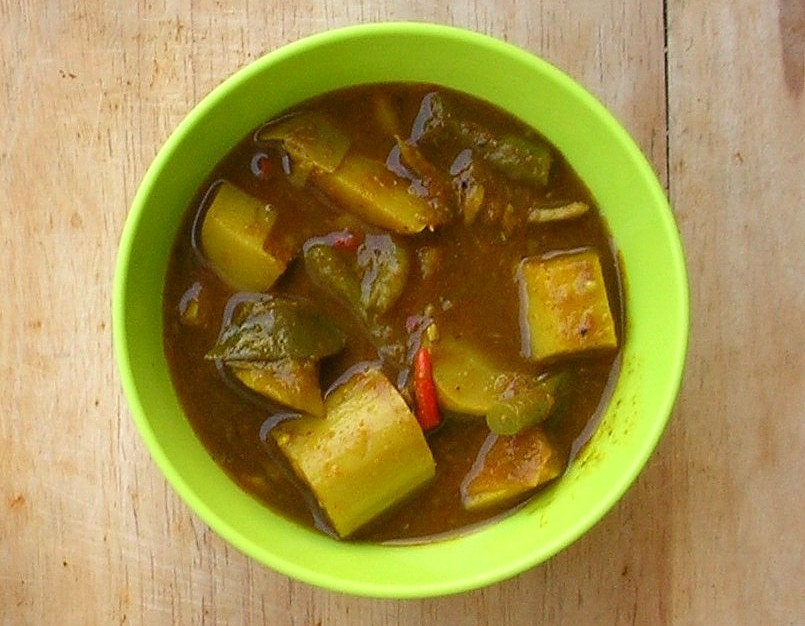
- Kaeng tai pla in Bangkok
- Alternative names: kaeng phung pla
- Type: Curry
- Course: Lunch, dinner
- Place of origin: Thailand
- Region or state: Southern Thailand
- Serving temperature: Hot
- Main ingredients: Fish, vegetables, fermented fish viscera sauce

Kaeng tai pla (Thai: แกงไตปลา, pronounced [kɛ̄ːŋ tāj plāː]) is a curry of southern Thai cuisine. Its name is derived from tai pla, a salty sauce made from fermented fish entrails, which gives the curry a strong smell and flavor.

This curry is usually served with fresh vegetables in a separate plate and eaten along with steamed rice.

== History ==
Kaeng tai pla or kaeng phung pla is a southern food and the famous dish from Phatthalung Province, but is also found in other Southern cities. The dish was mentioned in Thai historical records since at least the reign of King Rama II of the Bangkok period, more than 200 years ago. Kaeng tai pla is originally influenced by South Indian cuisine, as many ingredients (cooking spices) used to make it came across the Indian Ocean from that region. Historically, there have been constant interactions and exchanges between cultures (and cuisines) of South Thailand and South India, in particular the Tamil kingdoms including the Chola. The main ingredient of kaeng tai pla is "tai pla" or "pung pla" made from the stomach of the fish marinated in salt. Typically the fish entrails used are from catfish and snakehead fish, fermented with salt for about 10–30 days, before it can be seasoned with spices and used for cooking.

In 2024, TasteAtlas, a website that provides information about food from all over the world, often ranks the best and worst dishes of various types. Most recently, they ranked the "Kaeng Tai Pla" was crowned the number 1 worst dish.

== Ingredients ==
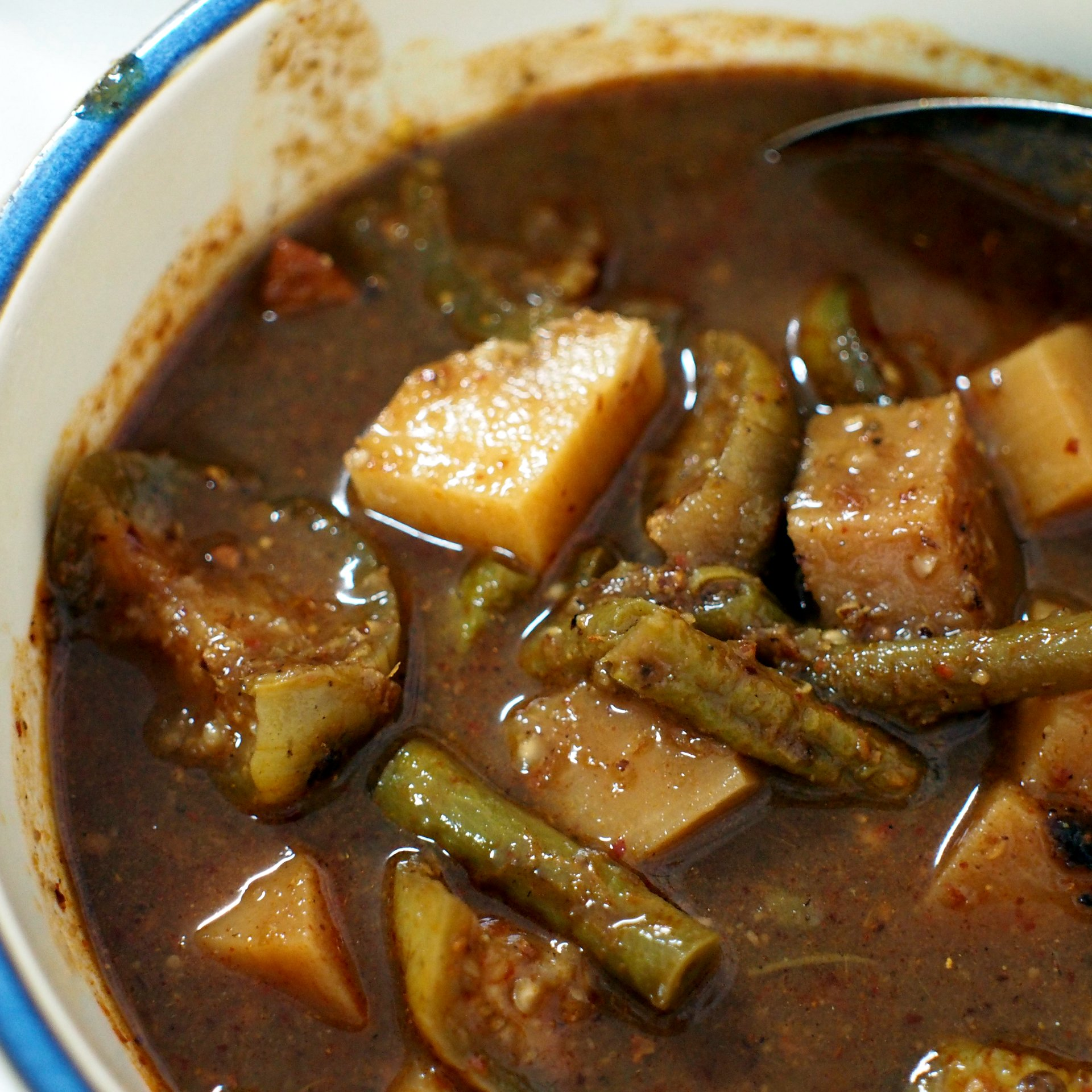
Close-up of kaeng tai pla

Kaeng tai pla is a highly spicy curry; it has a very intense umami taste. It is made mainly with fish and vegetables. Sometimes it includes prawns and certain variants use coconut milk instead of water.

The usual ingredients of the dish can include bamboo shoots, eggplants, pea eggplants, yardlong beans and fresh chilies. Other vegetables used alternatively are Parkia speciosa, baby corn, pumpkin and also potatoes if bamboo shoots are not available. In the past, only grilled catfish was used in the curry without the addition of any vegetables as the natural sweetness of cooked vegetables was not desirable.

The other ingredients are tai pla sauce, which contributes greatly to its characteristic smell and taste, as well as both dry and fresh chili peppers, shrimp paste, turmeric, lesser galangal, lemongrass, kaffir lime zest and leaves, shallots and garlic.

== See also ==
- List of Thai dishes
- Thai curry – Dishes in Thai cuisine made with curry paste
