= Eocoelopoma =

Eocoelopoma Temporal range: Early Eocene

Scientific classification
- Kingdom: Animalia
- Phylum: Chordata
- Class: Actinopterygii
- Order: Scombriformes
- Family: Scombridae
- Tribe: †Eocoelopomini
- Genus: †Eocoelopoma; Woodward, 1901

Type species
- †Eocoelopoma colei Woodward, 1901 ex Agassiz, 1845

Species
- †E. colei Woodward, 1901; †E. curvatum Woodward, 1901; †E. gigas Casier, 1952; †E. portentosum Bannikov, 1985

Synonyms
- †Coelopoma Agassiz, 1845 (name only)

Extinct genus of fishes

Eocoelopoma (meaning "dawn hollow-cover" in Greek) is an extinct genus of prehistoric scombrid fish, related to mackerels and tunas, known from the Eocene of Eurasia. It contains several species known from the Early Eocene of England and Turkmenistan.

The genus name originates from Coelopoma, coined as a nomen nudum by Agassiz (1844). Two species in the genus were also named by Agassiz as nomina nuda, until they were given by Woodward (1901).

The following species are known:

- †E. colei Woodward, 1901 ex Agassiz, 1845 (type species) - early Eocene of England (London Clay) (=Coelopoma colei Agassiz, 1845)
- †E. curvatum Woodward, 1901 ex Owen, 1854 - early Eocene of England (London Clay) (=Coelopoma laeve Agassiz, 1844, Coelopoma curvatum Owen, 1854)
- †E. gigas Casier, 1966 - early Eocene of England (London Clay)
- †E. portentosum Bannikov, 1985 - earliest Eocene of Turkmenistan (Danata Formation)

The former species E. hopwoodi has been reassigned to its own genus, Micrornatus.

== See also ==
- Prehistoric fish
- List of prehistoric bony fish
