= Aramichthys =

Aramichthys Temporal range: Middle Eocene

Scientific classification
- Kingdom: Animalia
- Phylum: Chordata
- Class: Actinopterygii
- Order: Scombriformes
- Family: Scombridae
- Genus: †Aramichthys; Signeux, 1959
- Species: †A. dammeseki

Binomial name
- †Aramichthys dammeseki Signeux, 1959

Extinct genus of fishes

Aramichthys ("Aram fish") is an extinct genus of prehistoric marine scombrid fish that lived during the middle division of the Eocene epoch. It contains a single species, A. dammeseki ("of Damascus") from Syria. Its remains were recovered from a chalk-marl quarry in the vicinity of Dummar.
