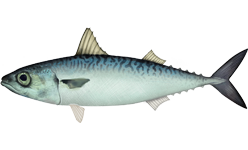

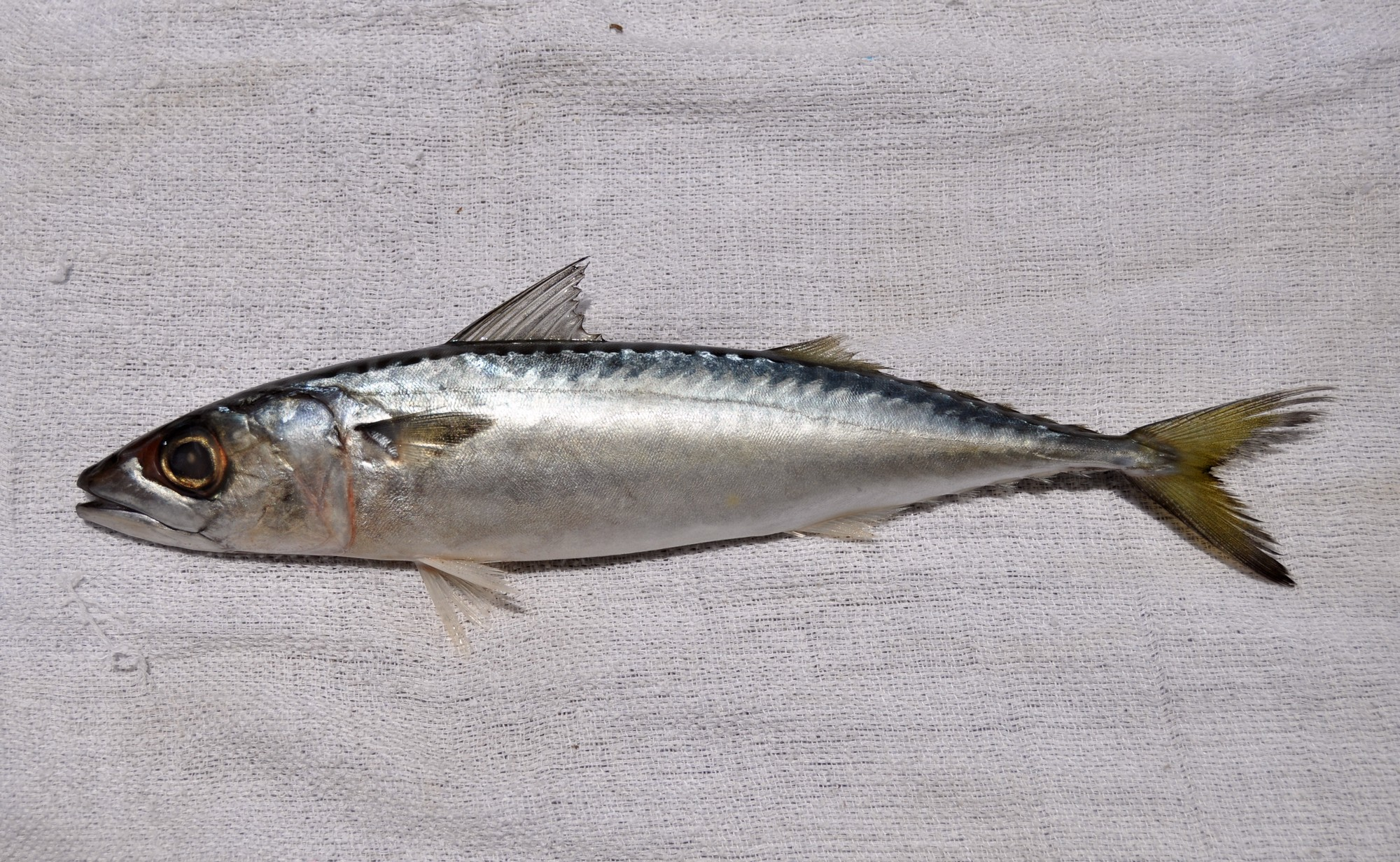

Conservation status
- Least Concern (IUCN 3.1)

Scientific classification
- Kingdom: Animalia
- Phylum: Chordata
- Class: Actinopterygii
- Division: Teleostei
- Order: Scombriformes
- Family: Scombridae
- Genus: Scomber
- Species: S. japonicus

Binomial name
- Scomber japonicus Houttuyn, 1782

= Chub mackerel =

Chub mackerel Temporal range: Pliocene – Recent

Species of fish

The chub mackerel, Pacific mackerel, or Pacific chub mackerel (Scomber japonicus) is a species of fish in the tuna and mackerel family, Scombridae. This species of mackerel closely resembles the Atlantic chub mackerel.

== Characteristics ==
The chub mackerel has a well-developed swim bladder attached with the esophagus, which the "true mackerels" in the genus Scomber lack, and a characteristic color difference is seen between the chub and the Atlantic chub, the latter being silvery-sided below the midline, whereas the lower part of the sides of the chub (otherwise colored somewhat like the Atlantic) are mottled with small dusky blotches, and the chub has a larger eye than the Atlantic. Less obvious differences are that the dorsal fins are closer together in the chub and only 9 or 10 spines are in its first dorsal fin instead of 11 or more, which is the usual count in the Atlantic mackerel. In most species, the mackerel is known to travel in large schools. It is a smaller fish than its better-known relatives, growing to a length around 8 to 14 inches (20 to 36 cm).

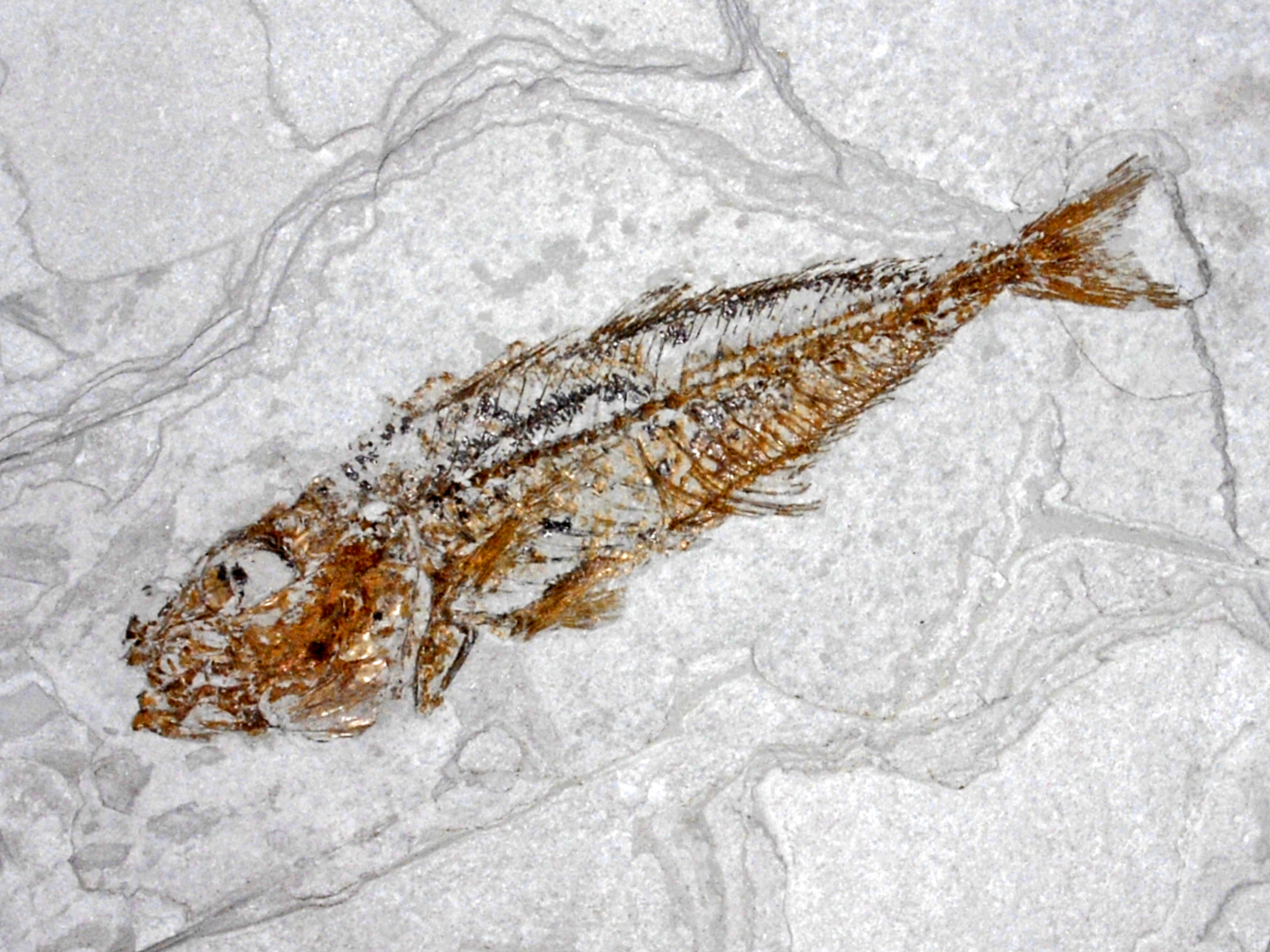
Fossil of Scomber japonicus from Pliocene of Italy

Pacific mackerel can live up to 18 years and it is able to reproduce by 4 years of age. Spawns from late April to September off of California, spawning events take place several times a year and yields about 70,000 eggs each time.

== Habits ==
Chub mackerel school like Atlantic mackerel, and their feeding habits are much the same, eating the same species of pelagic crustaceans and Sagittae. Specimens of Atlantic Mackerel taken at Woods Hole ate chiefly copepods, and to a lesser extent amphipods, salps, appendicularians, and young herring. Chub mackerel follow thrown bait as readily and bite quite as greedily as Atlantic mackerel do. Chub mackerel exhibit indeterminate batch spawning behavior, releasing multiple batches of eggs throughout a single reproduction season. In the eastern Pacific, spawning intensity is closely tied to seasonal coastal upwelling, which ensures adequate planktonic food density for early larval survival.

== Fossil record ==
Fossils of Scomber japonicus have been found in the Pliocene of Italy (age range: from 3 to 2.2 million years ago.).

== Distribution ==
Chub mackerel are widespread in the Indo-Pacific. They are absent from the Indian Ocean except for a small range in South Africa from KwaZulu-Natal to Western Cape. In the Atlantic, they are replaced by the closely related Atlantic chub mackerel. The chub mackerel is widely distributed, usually found in the northwestern, southeastern, and northeastern Pacific, including the Gulf of California. In the eastern Pacific, it can be found from Southeast Alaska to central Mexico. Chub mackerel are generally found within 20 miles (32 km) off the coast in waters between 50 and 72 °F (10 and 22 °C). Young mackerel live around sandy beaches or kelp beds, while adults are found in deeper waters in shallow banks to 1,000 feet (300 m) deep. Chub mackerel school with other pelagic species, such as other types of mackerels and sardines. In 2015, a new species of mackerels were found in the Indian Ocean classified as Scomber indicus.

== Diet ==
As larvae, chub mackerel feed mainly on copepods and rotifers and sometimes even smaller larvae of their own kind. Chub mackerel larvae can consume up to 87% of their dry body weight a day. As juveniles, chub mackerel feed mainly on zooplankton. As adults, they feed on mysids and euphausids.

In the California Current Ecosystem, the chub mackerel serves as a crucial mid-trophic level forage fish. Their population dynamics are highly responsive to coastal upwelling events, which dictate the availability of zooplankton. Consequently, they act as a primary prey source for regional marine predators, including the California sea lion (Zalophus californianus), brown pelicans (Pelecanus occidentalis), and various cetaceans.

== Spawning and maturation ==
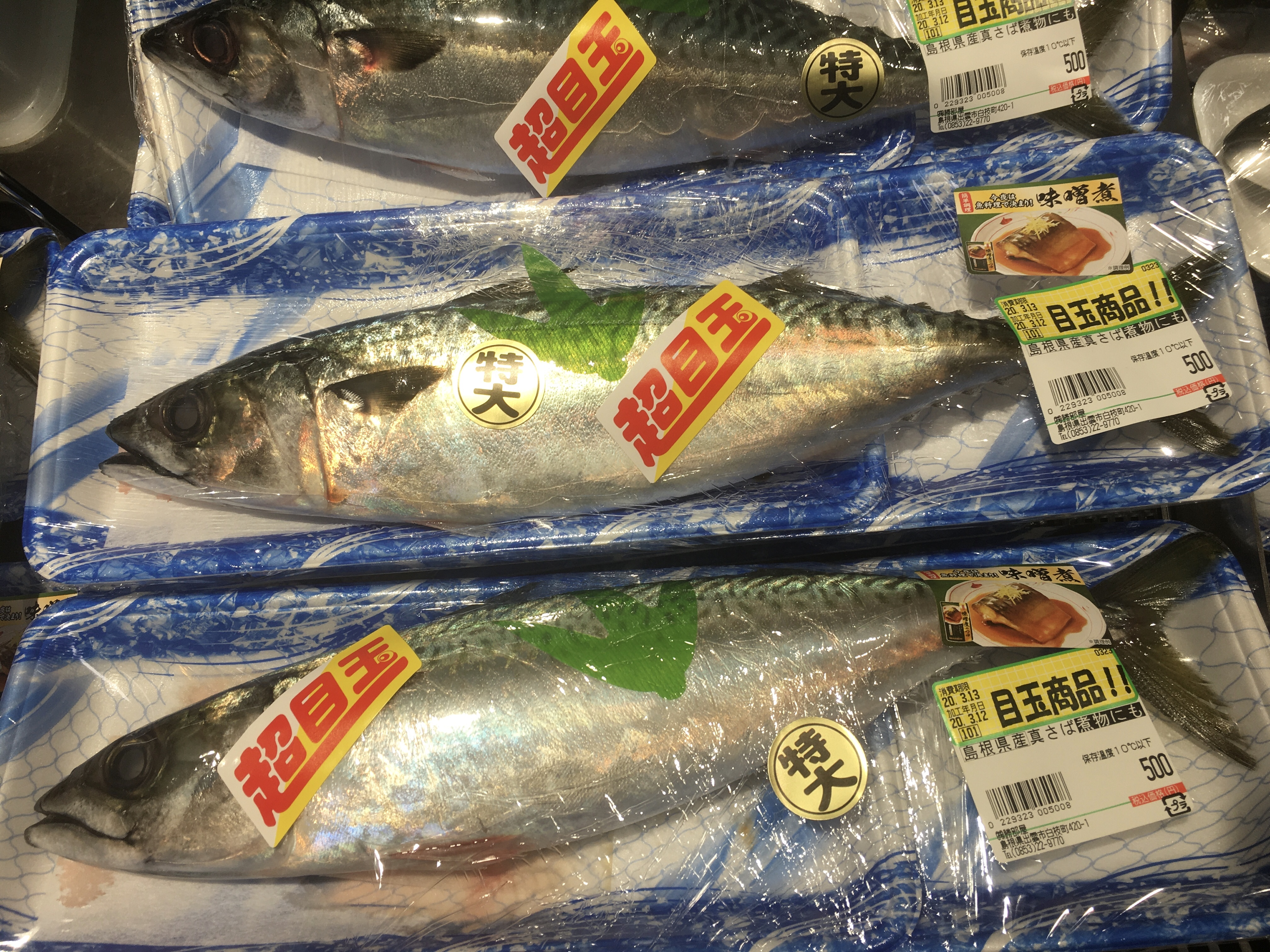
Sold at a market in Shimane, Japan

Spawning between chub mackerel typically occurs at temperatures of 59 to 68 °F. This in turn, leads to different mating seasons depending on what part of the hemisphere they are located. Females lay about 100,000 to 400,000 eggs during breeding season. The mackerel is constantly competing with other fish for food. Although maturation of chub mackerel has never been thoroughly documented, data show that spawning can happen from March through October, but mostly happens from April through August. Sometimes in females, ripe translucent eggs appear simultaneously with unripe ova in early stages of development; this is also seen with the Atlantic mackerel.

== Defense mechanisms ==
The chub mackerel relies on camouflaging itself to stay hidden from its predators. It has a dorsal pattern very similar to the light pattern of the waves and sun. When in danger, the fish move close to the surface of the water to merge with the flickering light of the sun making them difficult to see from above, which protects them from predatory birds. The countershading on their ventral surfaces likewise makes it difficult for larger predatory fish like tuna and barracuda to pick them out from the background.

== Fisheries ==
Global capture production of Pacific chub mackerel (Scomber japonicus) in million tonnes from 1950 to 2022, as reported by the FAO

Known to fisherman as the hardhead, the chub mackerel is regularly fished and canned for human consumption, pet food, bait, or served fresh. From 1980 to 1989, the recreational catch average in California was 1,462 tons. Since they have begun being fished, the chub mackerel reached its catching peak in 1978 with 3,412,602 tons. Since 1978, the catch ratings have continued to decrease, but picked back up a little in 1995. The ideal method for catching chub mackerel is round-haul gear such as purse seines. Bycatch is low because nets are placed directly on schools of fish. Chub mackerel are caught all year round, but especially between June and November. They can be caught on both sides of North America, but the most important fisheries commercially are in California and Mexico.

== As food ==
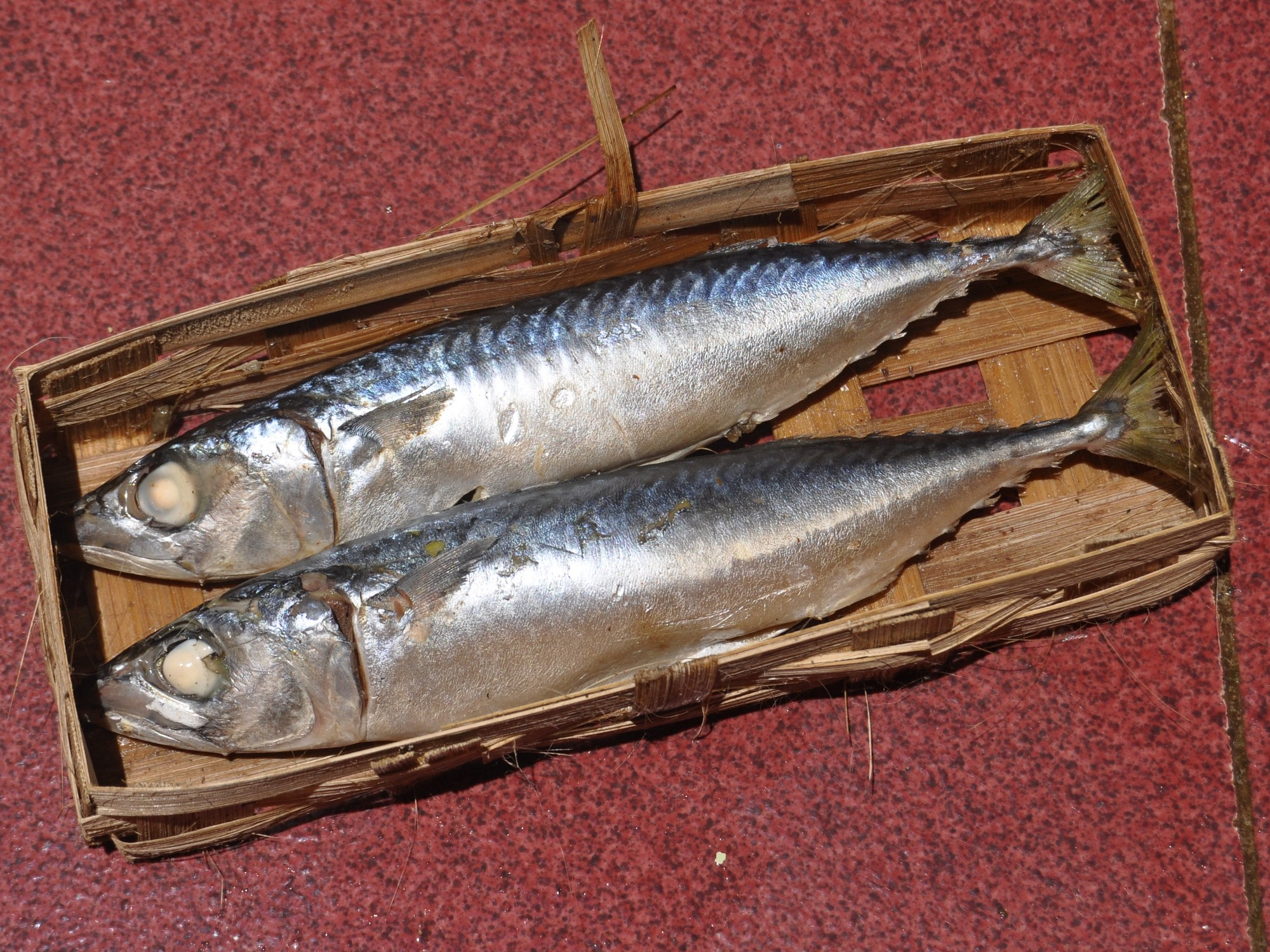
Indonesian steamed chub mackerel

According to nutrition specialists, the chub mackerel is a healthy meal, high in protein and rich in omega-3 and unsaturated fatty acids. Due to its high energy and protein intake, and low carbohydrate value, it is recommended in the diets of growing children and pregnant women, although it may contain high levels of heavy metals. The chub mackerel is a popular dish in Sicilian cuisine, in which it is served in a variety of ways. In the Sicilian culture, the chub mackerel is called a variety of names, strummu ucchiutu, varatulu scrummu, or occhiutu. In the kitchen and market, the fish is in the best condition if the meat is firm and the eyes are clear with the colors bright. For the most part, it is eaten fresh, but can be seen pickled or frozen. In Sicilian cuisine, it is also served filleted and raw, marinated in oil, lemon, salt, and pepper. Jorim is a Korean dish made with tofu, vegetables, meat and seafood. Mackerel is also one of the most popular foods for Koreans as jorim.

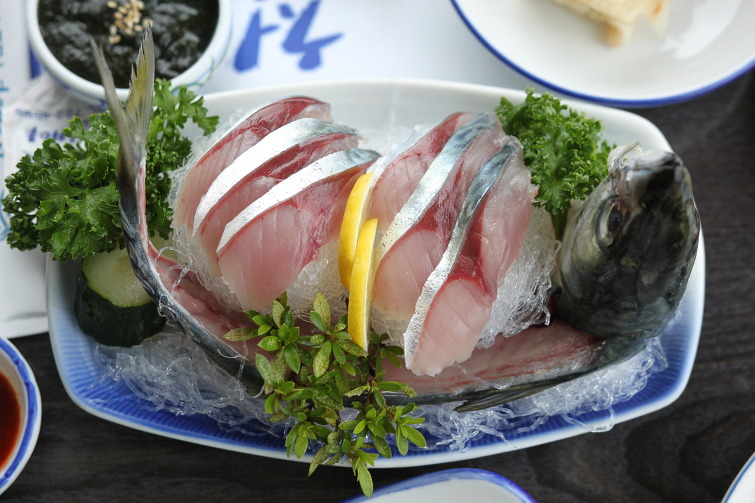
Godeungeo-hoe (raw chub mackerel)

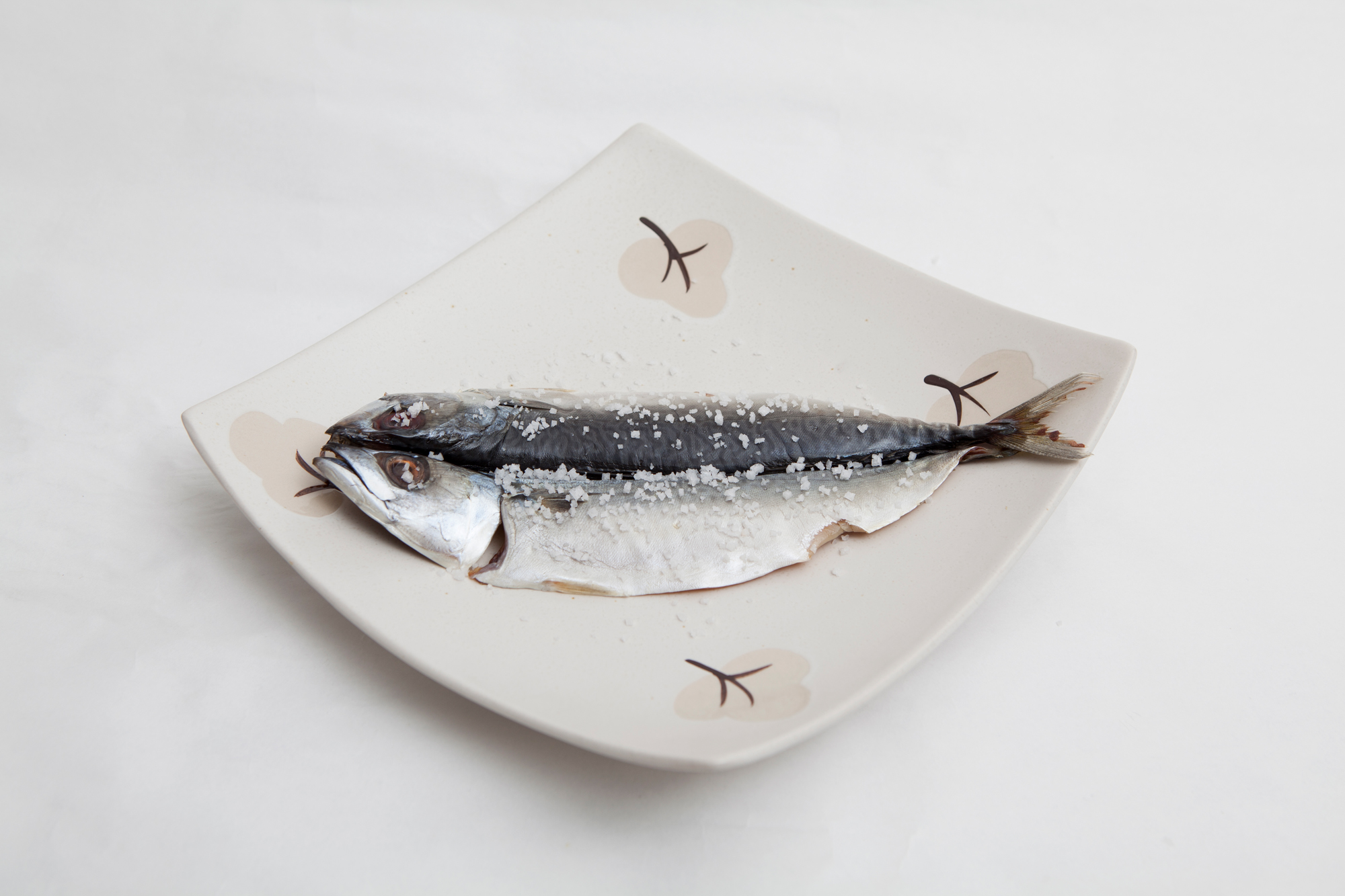
Godeungeo-jaban (salted chub mackerel)

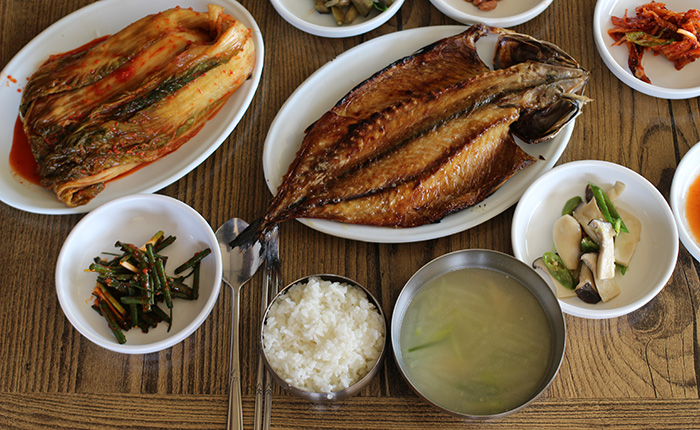
Gan-godeungeo, salted mackerel dish of Andong

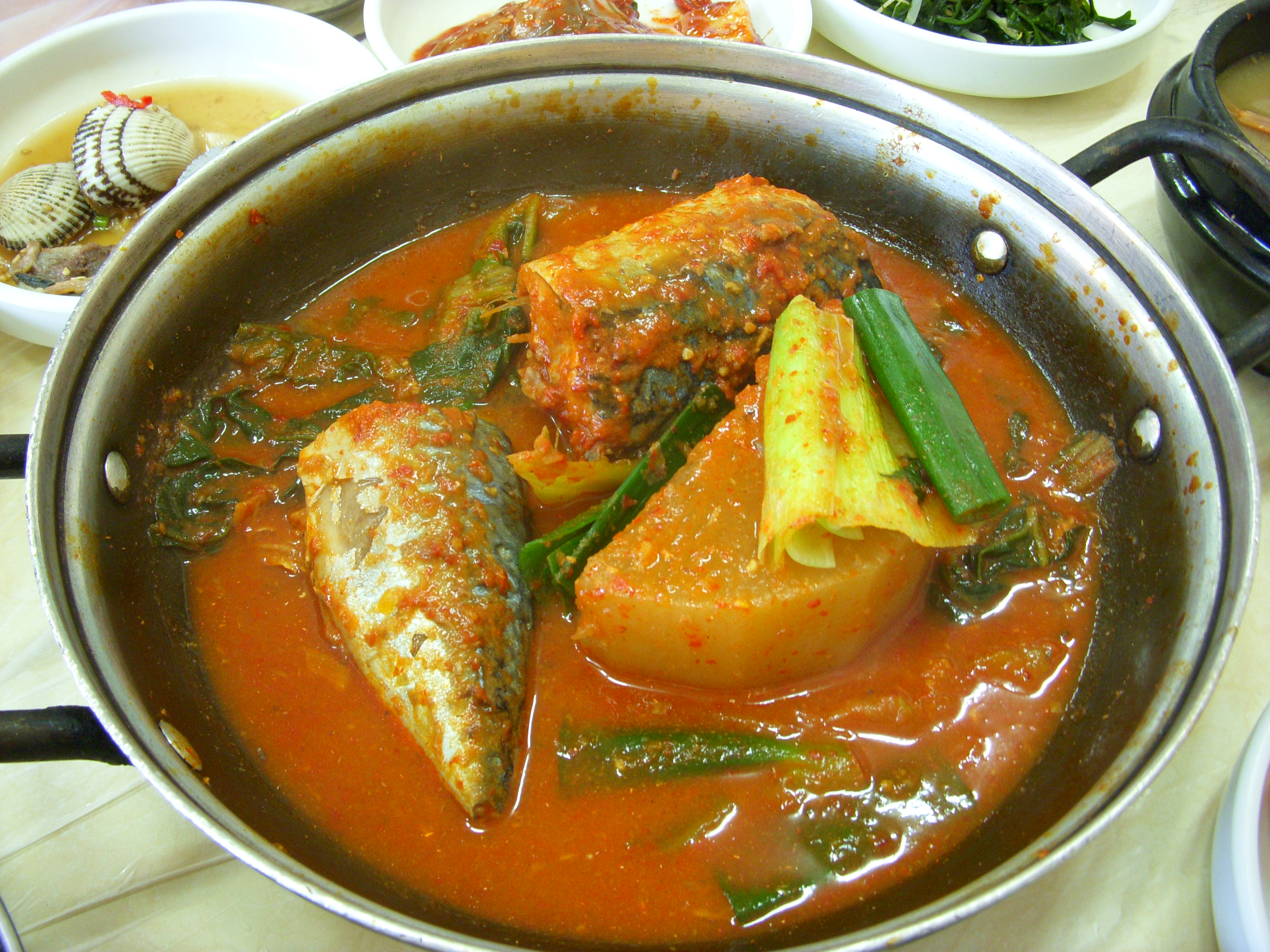

== Further references ==
- Pacific mackerel NOAA FishWatch. Retrieved 11 November 2012.
