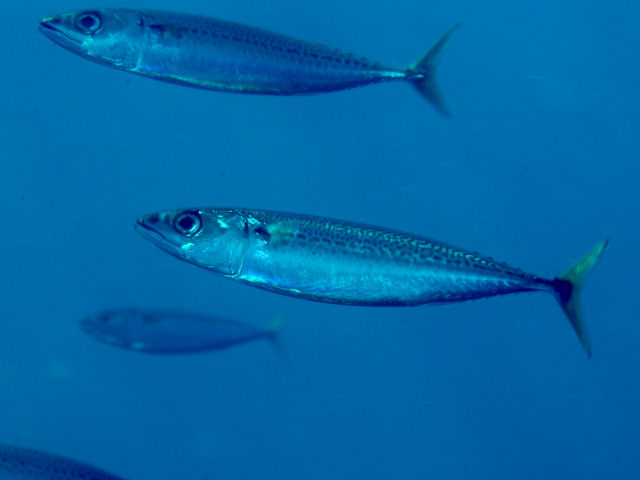

Conservation status
- Least Concern (IUCN 3.1)

Scientific classification
- Kingdom: Animalia
- Phylum: Chordata
- Class: Actinopterygii
- Order: Scombriformes
- Family: Scombridae
- Genus: Scomber
- Species: S. australasicus

Binomial name
- Scomber australasicus Cuvier, 1832

Synonyms
- Scomber tapeinocephalus Bleeker, 1854; Scomber antarcticus Castelnau, 1872; Scomber indicus Abdussamand, Sukumaran, and Ratheesh, 2016

= Blue mackerel =

Species of fish

The blue mackerel (Scomber australasicus), also called Japanese mackerel, Pacific mackerel, slimy mackerel, or spotted chub mackerel, is a fish of the family Scombridae.

== Description ==
The blue mackerel typically reaches 30 cm (12 in) in fork length. It can reach 44 cm (17 in) in fork length and 1.4 kg (3.1 lb) in weight.

Mackerels have a round body that narrows into the tail after the second dorsal fin, similar to a tuna fish. Blue mackerel are often mistaken for chub mackerel. In fact, blue mackerel were believed to be a subspecies of chub mackerel until the late 1980s. Though they are both in the same genus (Scomber), blue mackerel set themselves apart by differing structural genes than those of the chub mackerel. Other, more obvious, characteristics set these two apart, like the longer anal spine of the blue mackerel, and the amount of spines on the first dorsal fin.

== Distribution and habitat ==
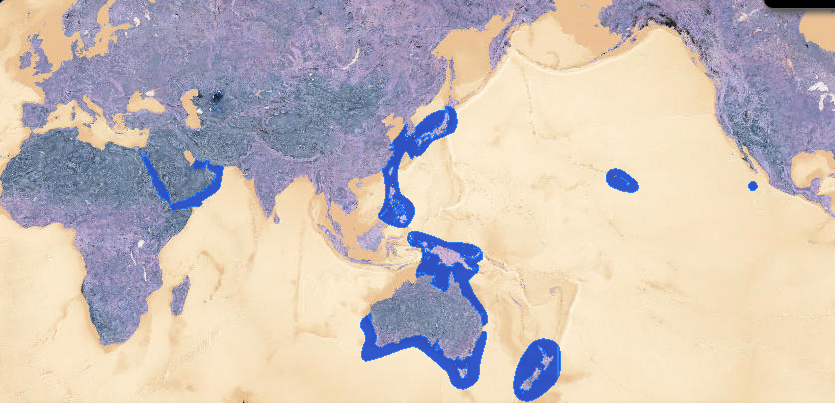
Range of Scomber australasicus

The blue mackerel is found in tropical to subtropical waters of the Indian and Pacific Oceans. In the Indo-West Pacific, there is a population in the Red Sea and western Arabian Sea, one in the Northwest Pacific (Japan, China, and Taiwan), and another one in the Southwest Pacific (Australia and New Zealand). Furthermore, the blue mackerel also occur in the eastern Pacific (Hawaii and Revillagigedo Islands, Mexico). It occurs in surface waters down to 300 m (980 ft).

== Biology and ecology ==
The blue mackerel is known as a voracious and indiscriminate carnivore, devouring microscopic plankton, krill, anchovies, and dead cut bait, and striking readily on lures and other flies. When in a school and in a feeding frenzy, blue mackerel will strike at nonfood items such as cigarette butts and even bare hooks. They typically eat smaller pelagic fish. Due to their eating habits and their diurnal lifestyles, blue mackerel have evolved large eyes with higher sensitivity in their retinas.

=== Lifespan ===
In the East China Sea, blue mackerel spawn between February and May, when the water temperatures are ideal. In New South Wales, most spawning occurs 10 km (6.2 mi) offshore in waters 100–125 m (328–410 ft) in depth. The East Australian Current can carry eggs and larvae away from the original spawning grounds, broadening the area in which blue mackerel are located. However, egg and larvae probability of surviving decreases the further they are carried by the current. A mature blue mackerel is considered to be over 31 cm (12 in) long. Mackerel can live up to 7 years and grow up to 50 cm (20 in) in length, but are most commonly found to be between 1 and 3 years of age. Counting the marks on otoliths is used to determine the age of blue mackerel.

== Human interactions ==
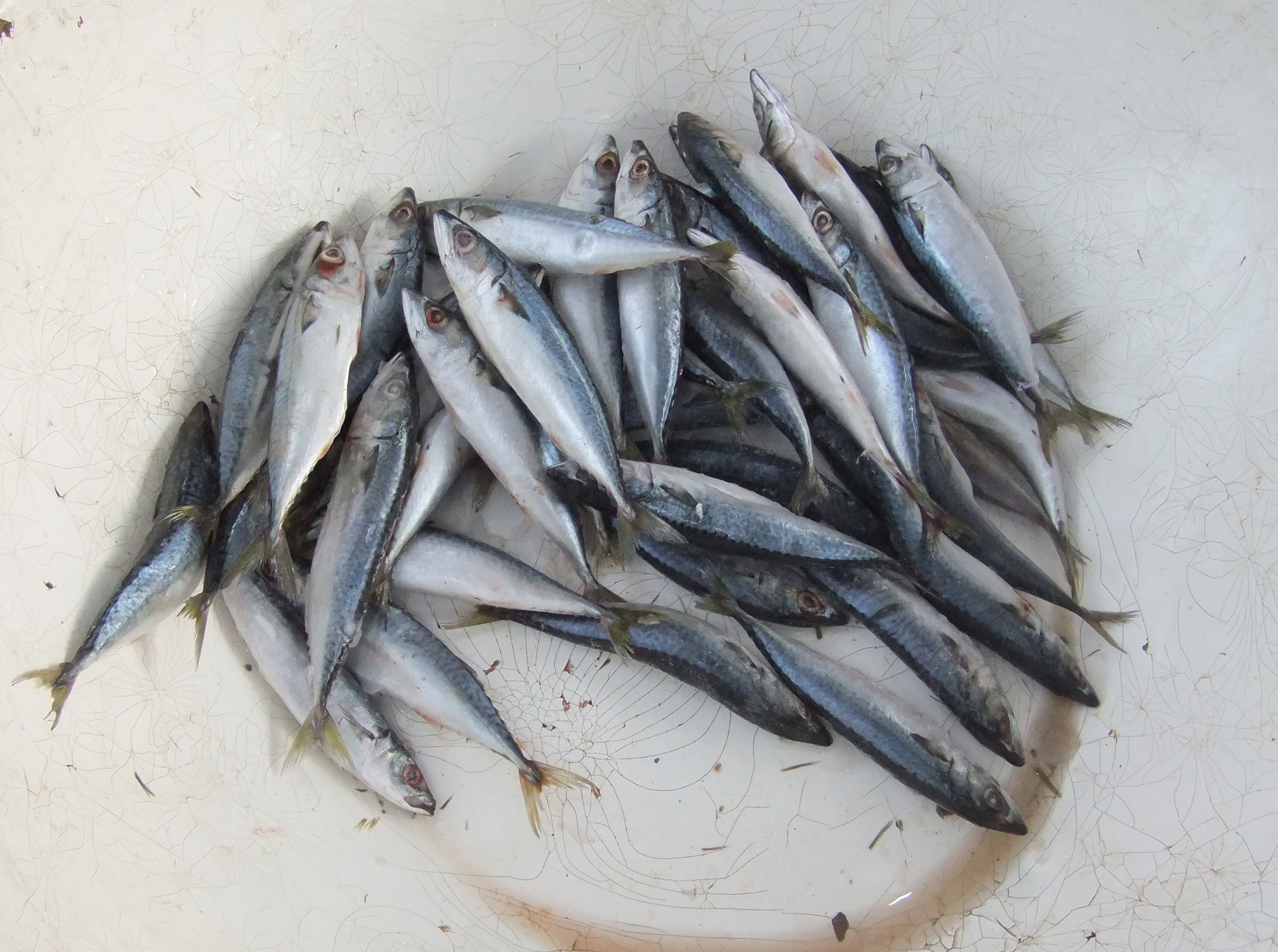
Blue mackerel caught off Java

The blue mackerel can be flighty and difficult to catch, especially in estuaries and harbors. Blue mackerel are caught for both commercial and private use, for food as well as bait for tuna and other fish.

Blue mackerel are often used as cat food, but are also consumed by humans smoked, grilled, or broiled. While easy to fillet and skin, they are difficult to debone, and care must be taken to avoid damaging their soft flesh. Blue mackerel are also commonly used as meat binders. After being freeze-dried, the protein is extracted and put into other meat products to keep the meat and seasonings bound tightly together, allowing costs to be lowered and enhancing the flavor and texture of the product.

=== Local names ===
In Japanese, it is known as goma-saba (胡麻鯖 sesame mackerel).

In New Zealand, it is known by its Māori name tawatawa which is a cognate to kawakawa, kavakava and tavatava which are the respective Hawaiian, Tongan and Samoan names for Euthynnus affinis.
