= Landanichthys =

Landanichthys Temporal range: Middle Paleocene (Selandian)

Scientific classification
- Kingdom: Animalia
- Phylum: Chordata
- Class: Actinopterygii
- Division: Teleostei
- Order: Scombriformes
- Family: Scombridae
- Tribe: †Eocoelopomini
- Genus: †Landanichthys; Dartevelle & Casier, 1949

Species
- †L. lusitanicus Dartevelle & Casier, 1949; †L. moutai Dartevelle & Casier, 1949

Extinct genus of fishes

Landanichthys is an extinct genus of prehistoric marine scombrid fish that lived off the western coast of Africa during the Selandian stage of the Paleocene epoch.

Two species are known:

- †L. lusitanicus Dartevelle & Casier, 1949 - Middle Paleocene of Cabinda, Angola (Landana Formation)
- †L. moutai Dartevelle & Casier, 1949 - Middle Paleocene of Cabinda, Angola (Landana Formation)

The distinctiveness of both these species is uncertain, and the original specimens of both are now considered lost. The only remaining specimen is the partial skull of an indeterminate species, although likely referable to L. lusitanicus.

It is a crown group-scombrid in the subfamily Scombrinae, and potentially belongs to the tribe Eocoelopomini, which contains several other prehistoric Paleogene scombrids known from England & Turkmenistan.
