= Wetherellus =

Scientific classification
- Kingdom: Animalia
- Phylum: Chordata
- Class: Actinopterygii
- Division: Teleostei
- Order: Scombriformes
- Family: Scombridae
- Genus: †Wetherellus; Casier, 1966

Species
- Wetherellus brevior Casier, 1966; Wetherellus cristatus (Agassiz 1844); Wetherellus longior Casier, 1966

Extinct genus of fishes

Wetherellus is an extinct genus of mackerel from the Eocene.
