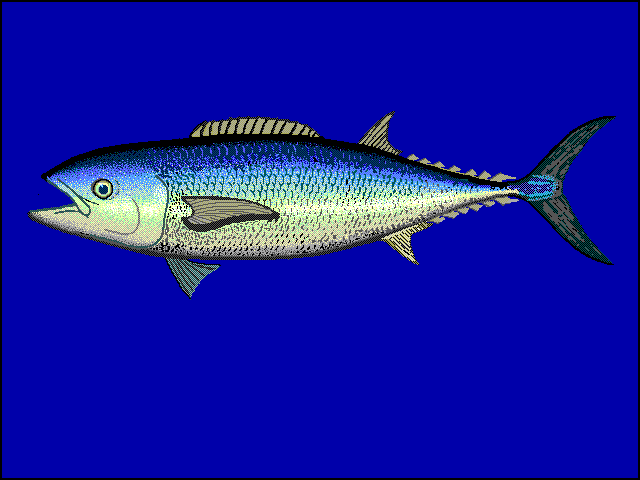

Conservation status
- Least Concern (IUCN 3.1)

Scientific classification
- Kingdom: Animalia
- Phylum: Chordata
- Class: Actinopterygii
- Order: Scombriformes
- Family: Scombridae
- Subfamily: Gasterochismatinae; Lahille, 1903
- Genus: Gasterochisma; Richardson, 1845
- Species: G. melampus

Binomial name
- Gasterochisma melampus Richardson, 1845

Synonyms
- Chenogaster holmbergi (Lahille, 1903); Lepidothynnus huttoni (Günther, 1889)

= Butterfly kingfish =

Species of fish

The butterfly kingfish (Gasterochisma melampus) is an ocean-dwelling ray-finned bony fish in the mackerel family, Scombridae – a family which it shares with the tunas, mackerels, Spanish mackerels, and bonitos. It, however, represents a lineage distinct from all other scombrids and has therefore been placed in its own genus Gasterochisma and subfamily Gasterochismatinae.

Although taxonomists and the Food and Agriculture Organization of the United Nations have accepted the name "butterfly kingfish", this fish has had many common names, including big-scaled mackerel, bigscale mackerel, butterfly mackerel, butterfly tuna, scaled tunny, scaly tuna, and others. In 1993, the U.S. Food and Drug Administration gave approval for this fish to be marketed simply as "mackerel".

== Description ==
The juveniles of the butterfly kingfish are characterized by enormous pelvic fins that are longer than the length of its head, and that become more proportional as the fish grows. At any size, the pelvic fin tucks into a deep ventral groove, in much the same way as the first dorsal spines do in all scombrids. This species has very large cycloid scales, below which is a thick layer of fat. The swim bladder has two anterior projections that extend into the back of the skull, near the inner ear. This fish lacks the median keel on the caudal peduncle – it only has the characteristic pair of small keels on each side of the base of the caudal fin, as do other scombrids. It has 21 precaudal vertebrae, plus 23 caudal vertebrae.

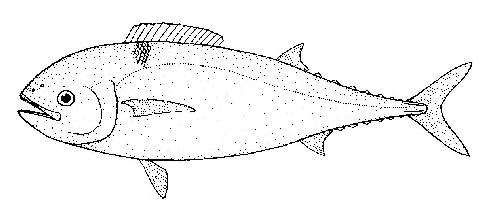
Drawing of a butterfly kingfish

This fish can be found around the world in southern temperate waters of 8–15 °C (46–59 °F), but most commonly under 10 °C (50 °F), and at depths to 200 m (660 ft) in the open ocean. It grows to a length of 1.64 m (5.4 ft) with a weight of 50 kg (110 lb), possible up to 70 kg (150 lb).

Most bony fishes are ectothermic, or cold-blooded, but this species, much like the related tunas, is endothermic and is able to raise its body temperature to achieve a degree of thermoregulation. It has a brain heater organ derived from the lateral rectus eye muscle, which is distinct from that of the billfishes, whose heater is derived from their superior rectus muscles.

== Etymology ==
Gasterochisma derives from the Ancient Greek: γαστήρ, romanized: (gaster), lit. 'stomach', and χίασμα (chiasma) "crossing; X-shaped; sign of the 'X'".

== Taxonomy ==
The evolutionary lineage of the butterfly kingfish is more primitive and quite different from that of the rest of the scombrids. Additionally, the morphology of this species is substantially different from that of the others – some suggest that it might belong in a different family altogether. At present, however, morphology and nuclear phylogeny provide support that Gasterochisma is sister to all other scombrids, and that both its genus, Gasterochisma, and its subfamily, Gasterochismatinae, remain as monotypic taxa under the family Scombridae.

The following cladogram shows the most likely evolutionary relationships between the butterfly kingfish and the tunas, mackerels, Spanish mackerels, and bonitos.

Butterfly kingfish, in the family Scombridae

- family Scombridae
  - subfamily
    - Gasterochismatinae
      - - genusGasterochisma
          - G. melampus, butterfly kingfish
  - subfamily
    - Scombrinae
      - - - - - tribe Scombrini
                - - mackerels (two genera)
        - - - - tribe Scomberomorini
                - Spanish mackerels (three genera)
          - - - tribe Sardini
                - - - bonitos (four genera)
            - - tribe Thunnini
                - - - tunas (five genera)

Cladogram: With 51 different species in the Scombridae, the butterfly kingfish sits apart from the rest – it is the only scombrid species that does not belong to the subfamily Scombrinae.

== Distribution ==
The butterfly kingfish has a circumglobal distribution in southern temperate waters. It has caught as far north as Hawaii and seems to be common around Oceania. It prefers waters between 8 and 15 °C (46 and 59 °F).

== Fisheries ==
While a rare catch, there is a minor commercial market, where they are caught incidentally while targeting other fish, especially through the use of longline fishing. It is of minor importance to recreational Fisheries.
