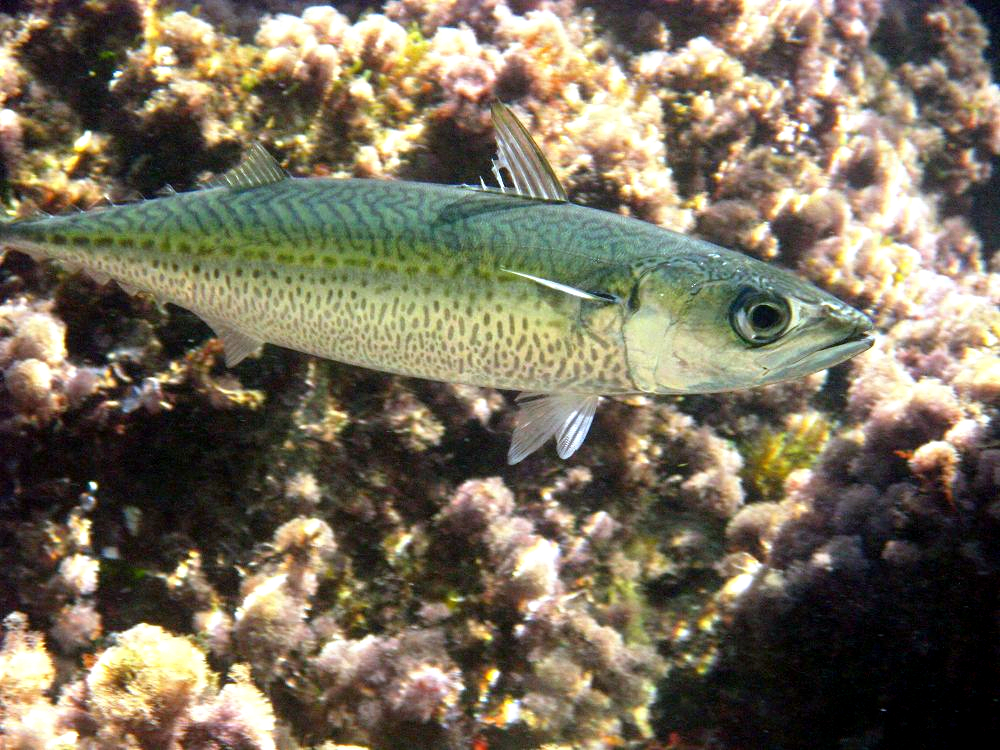

Conservation status
- Least Concern (IUCN 3.1)

Scientific classification
- Kingdom: Animalia
- Phylum: Chordata
- Class: Actinopterygii
- Division: Teleostei
- Order: Scombriformes
- Family: Scombridae
- Genus: Scomber
- Species: S. colias

Binomial name
- Scomber colias Gmelin, 1789

Synonyms
- Pneumatophorus colias (Gmelin, 1789); Pneumatophorus japonicus marplatensis López, 1955; Scomber capensis Cuvier, 1832; Scomber dekayi Storer, 1853; Scomber gigas Fowler, 1935; Scomber gracilis Swainson, 1839; Scomber grex Mitchill, 1814; Scomber japonicus (non Houttuyn, 1782); Scomber macrophthalmus Rafinesque, 1810; Scomber maculatus Couch, 1832; Scomber pneumatophorus Delaroche, 1809; Scomber scomber lacertus Walbaum, 1792; Scomber japonicus colias Gmelin, 1789; Scomber undulatus Swainson, 1839

= Atlantic chub mackerel =

Species of fish

Atlantic chub mackerel (Scomber colias), also known as tinker mackerel, is a pelagic schooling species of mackerel found in the Atlantic Ocean, the Mediterranean Sea, and the Black Sea. It was originally thought to be a subspecies of the chub mackerel, Scomber japonicus.

== Description ==
The Atlantic chub mackerel is a long, streamlined fish with a deeply forked tail, is all covered with very small fish scale. The first dorsal fin has 9 or 10 spines and is separated from the second dorsal fin by a space at least as long as its base. The origin of the anal fin is directly below or just behind the origin of the second dorsal fin. This fish is silvery in colour, the upper surface has oblique zigzagging lines while the belly is paler and spotted or marked with wavy lines.

== Ecology ==
Atlantic chub mackerel is an important pelagic forage species.

== Fisheries ==
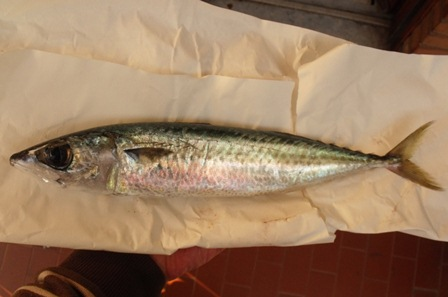
Atlantic chub mackerel bought at Roman fish market

Global capture production of Atlantic chub mackerel (Scomber colias) in thousand tonnes from 1950 to 2022, as reported by the FAO

This fish is particularly abundant in the eastern Mediterranean. Two variants are distinguished: in the late summer and autumn, the fish is fat and roe-filled, whereas in the late winter and spring it is very lean, almost emaciated. The Greek names for the two forms are koliós and tsíros, respectively. They are usually roasted, although the former form is often packed in salt for later consumption. The fish releases its own oil into the salt packing and acquires a very long shelf life. In the islands of the Aegean, it is a particularly popular delicacy, under the name goúna: fresh-caught mackerel is split open at the belly, eviscerated, and left to dry flesh-side up in the sun for one day. The same evening it is very briefly seared over a fire and then served with lemon juice.

Along the eastern seaboard of North America Atlantic chub mackerel were not the target of directed commercial fisheries until 2013 when commercial trawlers began targeting them because of a lack of squid. Landings went from almost zero to 5 million pounds within the year.

== As food ==
The Atlantic chub mackerel is rich in omega-3 and other unsaturated fatty acids. Nutritional data published by Portugal's Docapesca records its fat content at 13.4 grams per 100 grams of edible fish, including 3.7 grams of monounsaturated and 4.7 grams of polyunsaturated fatty acids. Similarly, the source lists approximately 1,218 mg of EPA and 2,128 mg of DHA per 100 grams, giving a combined EPA and DHA content of 3,346 mg. Other omega-3 fats identified in the species include DPA, ALA, SDA and ETA.

However, the Atlantic chub mackerel's total fat content can vary substantially by catch season. A year-long study published in 2020 recorded fat contents ranging from 1.3 grams per 100 grams of edible fish in February to 10.3 grams in September, the lowest and highest values observed during the study, respectively.

== Status ==
This fish has a wide range and is abundant over parts of that range. Although it is heavily fished in places, the population seems relatively stable and the IUCN has listed this species as Least Concern.

== Links ==
- Scomber colias at FishBase
- USDOI: Fishes of the Gulf of Maine
