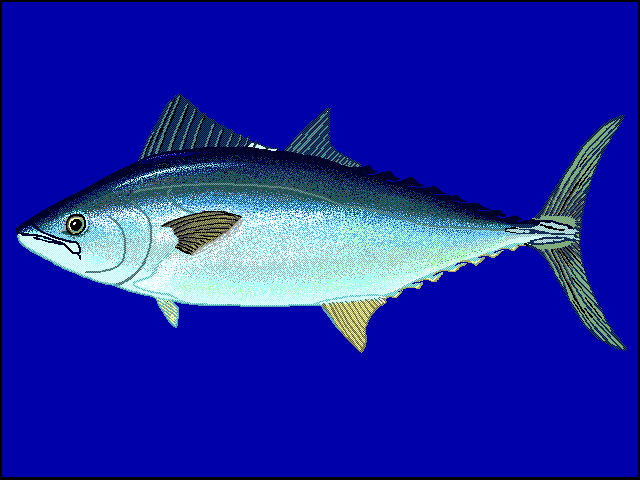
- Plain bonito (Orcynopsis unicolor)

Conservation status
- Least Concern (IUCN 3.1)

Scientific classification
- Kingdom: Animalia
- Phylum: Chordata
- Class: Actinopterygii
- Order: Scombriformes
- Family: Scombridae
- Subfamily: Scombrinae
- Tribe: Sardini
- Genus: Orcynopsis; Gill, 1862
- Species: O. unicolor

Binomial name
- Orcynopsis unicolor (Geoffroy Saint-Hilaire, 1817)

Synonyms
- Scomber unicolor Geoffroy Saint-Hilaire, 1817; Pelamichthys unicolor (Geoffroy Saint-Hilaire, 1817); Pelamys unicolor (Geoffroy Saint-Hilaire, 1817); Sarda unicolor (Geoffroy Saint-Hilaire, 1817); Cybium bonapartii Verany, 1847; Cybium altipinne Guichenot, 1861; Thynnus peregrinus Collett, 1879

= Orcynopsis unicolor =

Plain bonito

Species of fish

Orcynopsis unicolor, the plain bonito, is a species of ray-finned, bony fish in the bonito tribe of the mackerel family (Scombridae). It occurs in the eastern Atlantic from southern Norway, where it is a vagrant, to Senegal, although it is not found in the seas around the Macaronesian Islands. It is also found in the Mediterranean Sea and extends to the Black Sea.

This fish is classified into the genus Orcynopsis, which is a monotypic taxon, having only this single species in its membership. It grows to 130 cm (4 ft), and 13.1 kg (29 lb).
