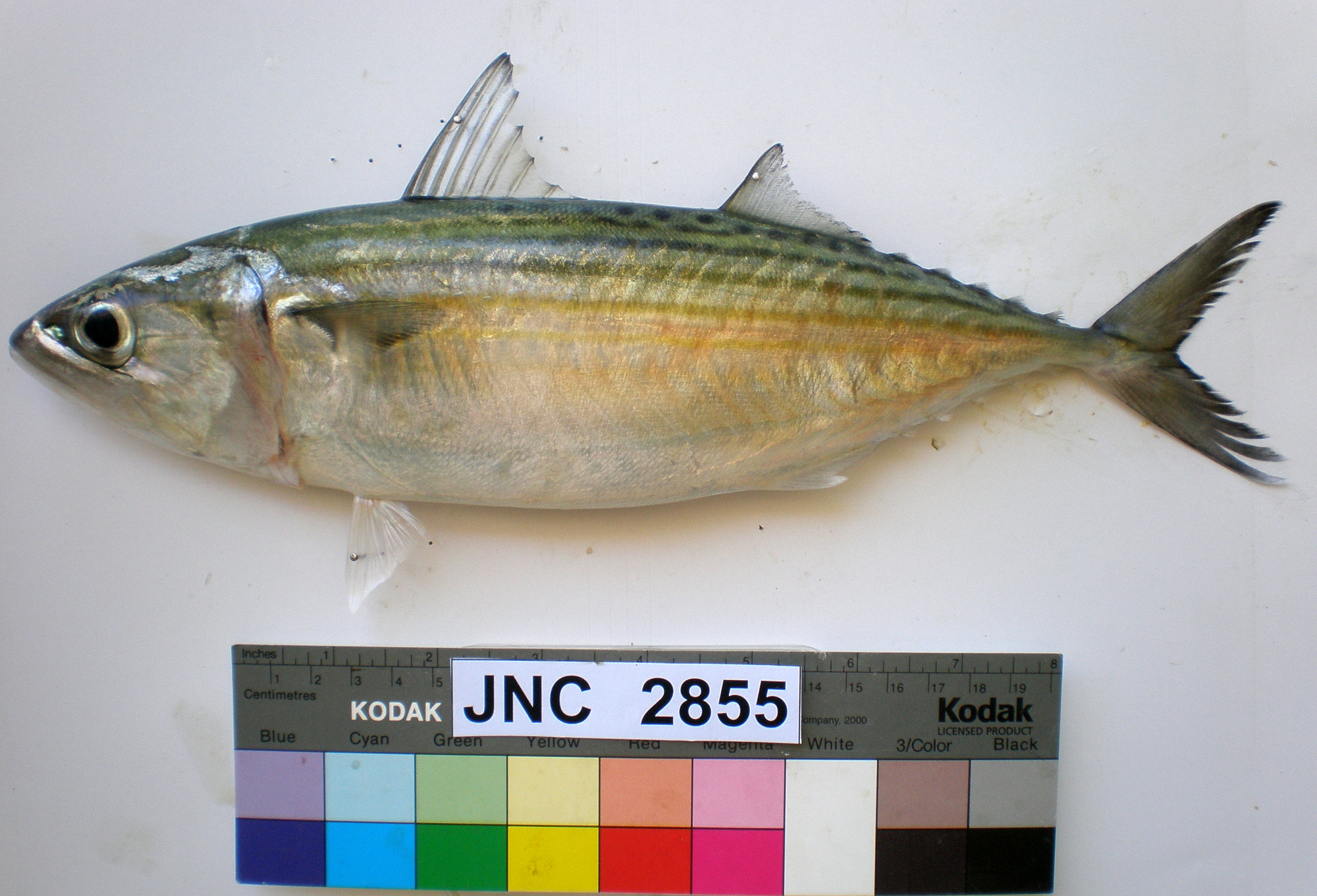
- Rastrelliger kanagurta

Scientific classification
- Kingdom: Animalia
- Phylum: Chordata
- Class: Actinopterygii
- Order: Scombriformes
- Family: Scombridae
- Tribe: Scombrini
- Genus: Rastrelliger; Jordan and Starks in Jordan and Dickerson, 1908

Type species
- Scomber brachysoma Bleeker, 1851

Species
- See text.

= Rastrelliger =

Genus of fishes

Rastrelliger is a mackerel genus in the family Scombridae. The three species of Rastrelliger together with the four species of Scomber constitute the tribe Scombrini, known as the "true mackerels".

== Species ==
The three species which comprise Rastrelliger are:

- Rastrelliger brachysoma (Bleeker, 1851) (short mackerel)
- Rastrelliger faughni, Matsui, 1967 (island mackerel)
- Rastrelliger kanagurta, (Cuvier, 1816) (Indian mackerel)
