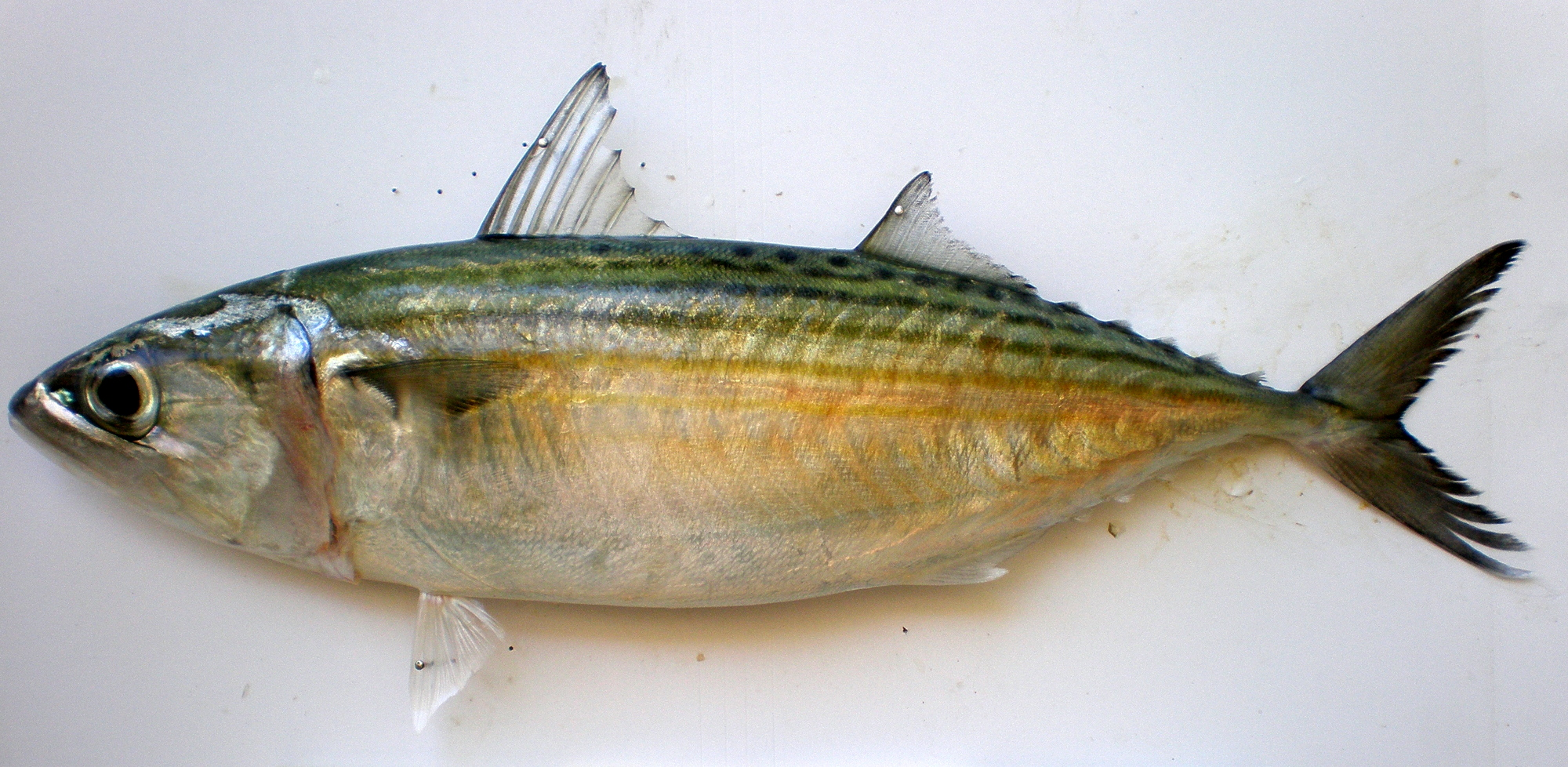

Conservation status
- Least Concern (IUCN 3.1)

Scientific classification
- Kingdom: Animalia
- Phylum: Chordata
- Class: Actinopterygii
- Division: Teleostei
- Order: Scombriformes
- Family: Scombridae
- Genus: Rastrelliger
- Species: R. kanagurta

Binomial name
- Rastrelliger kanagurta (Cuvier, 1816)

= Indian mackerel =

Species of ray-finned fish

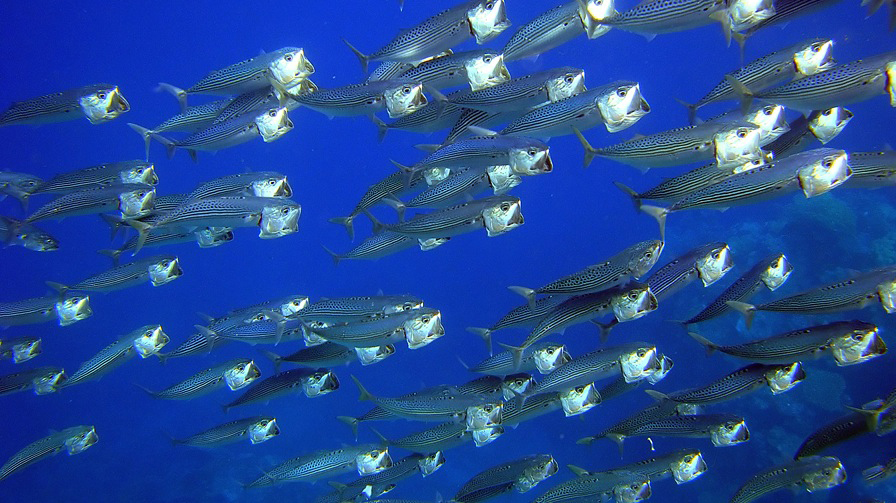
School of Indian mackerel ram feeding on macroplanton

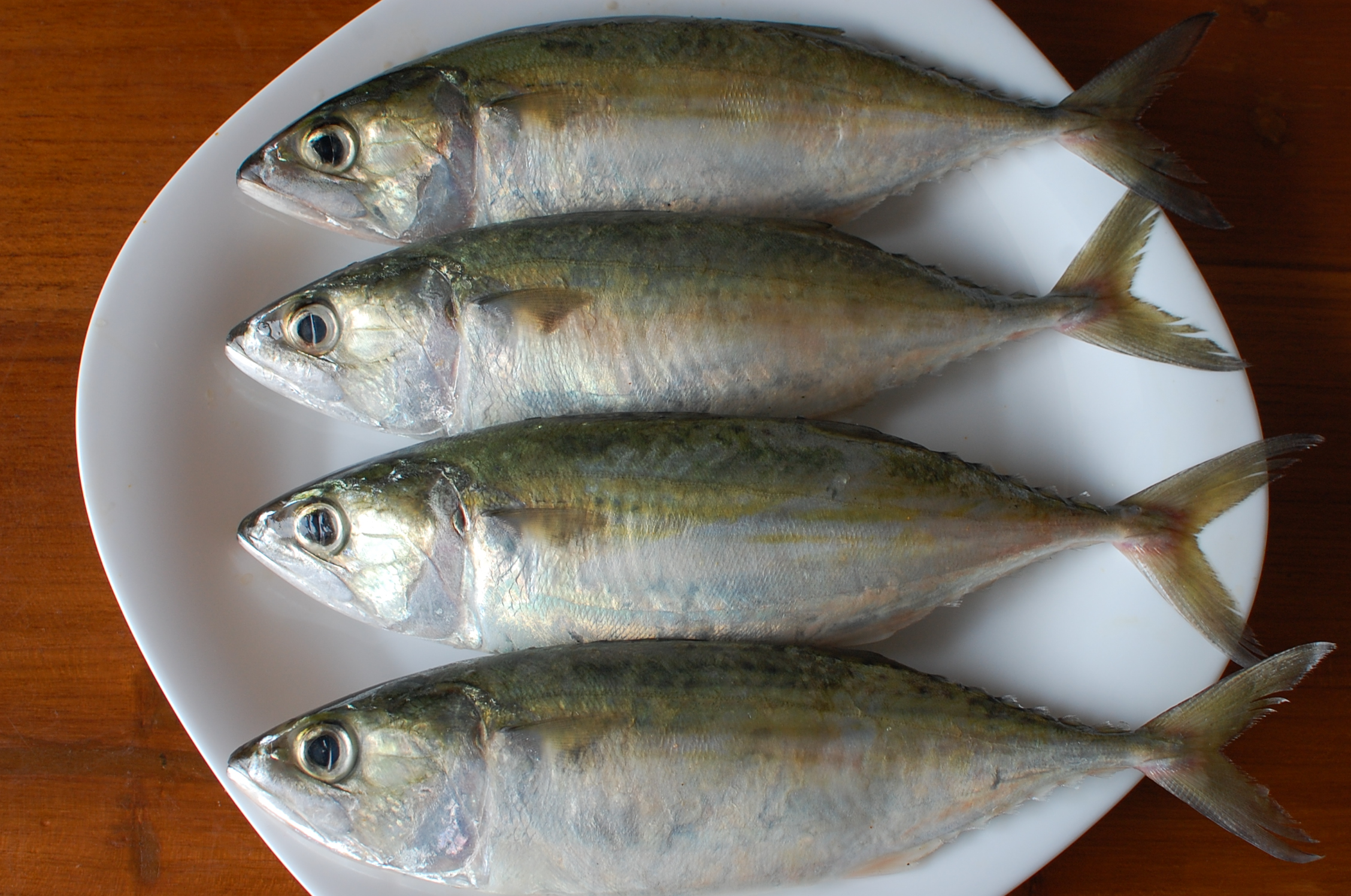
Indian mackerel

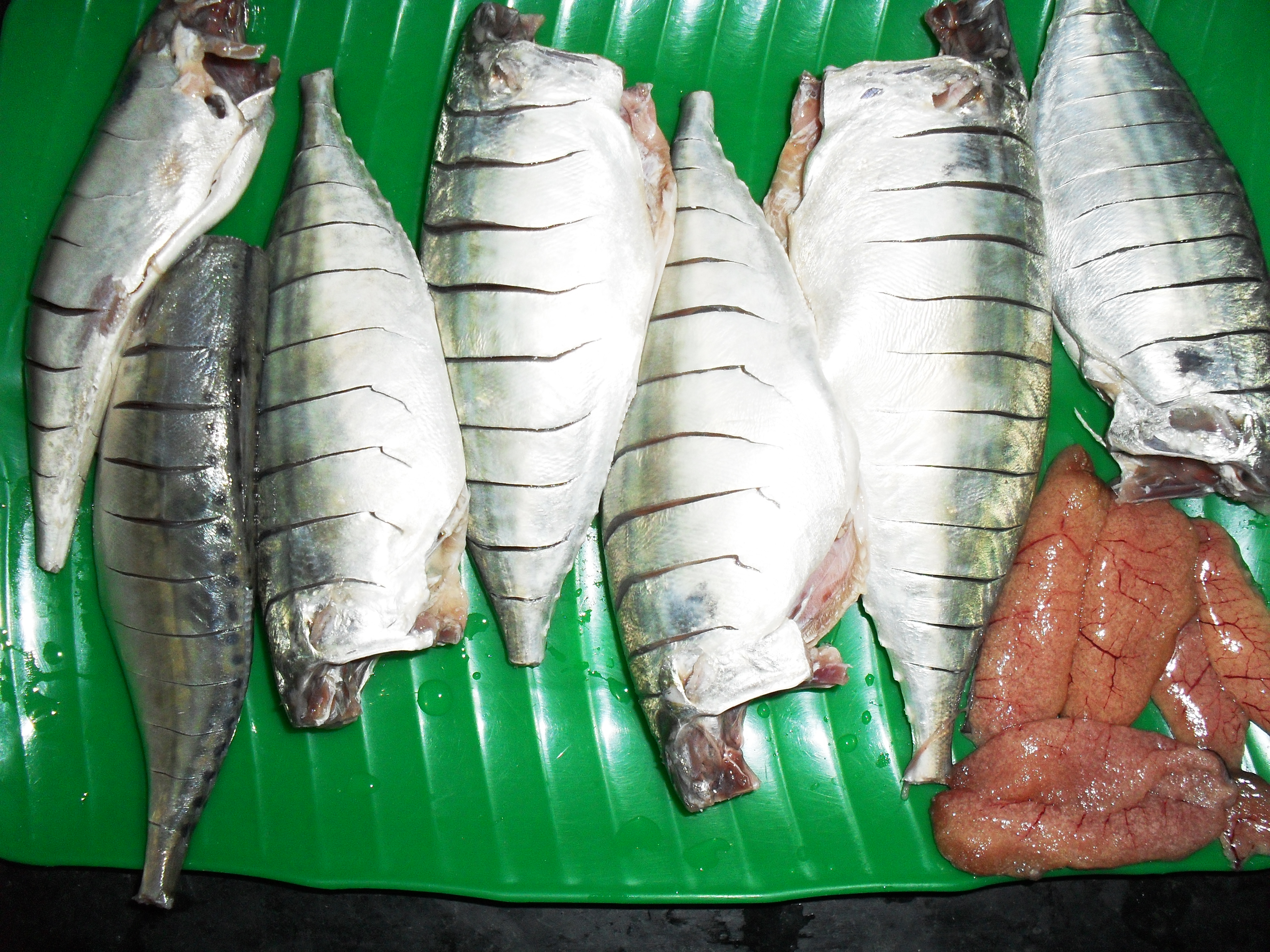
Indian mackerel, cleaned and scored and its roe. The heads have been removed.

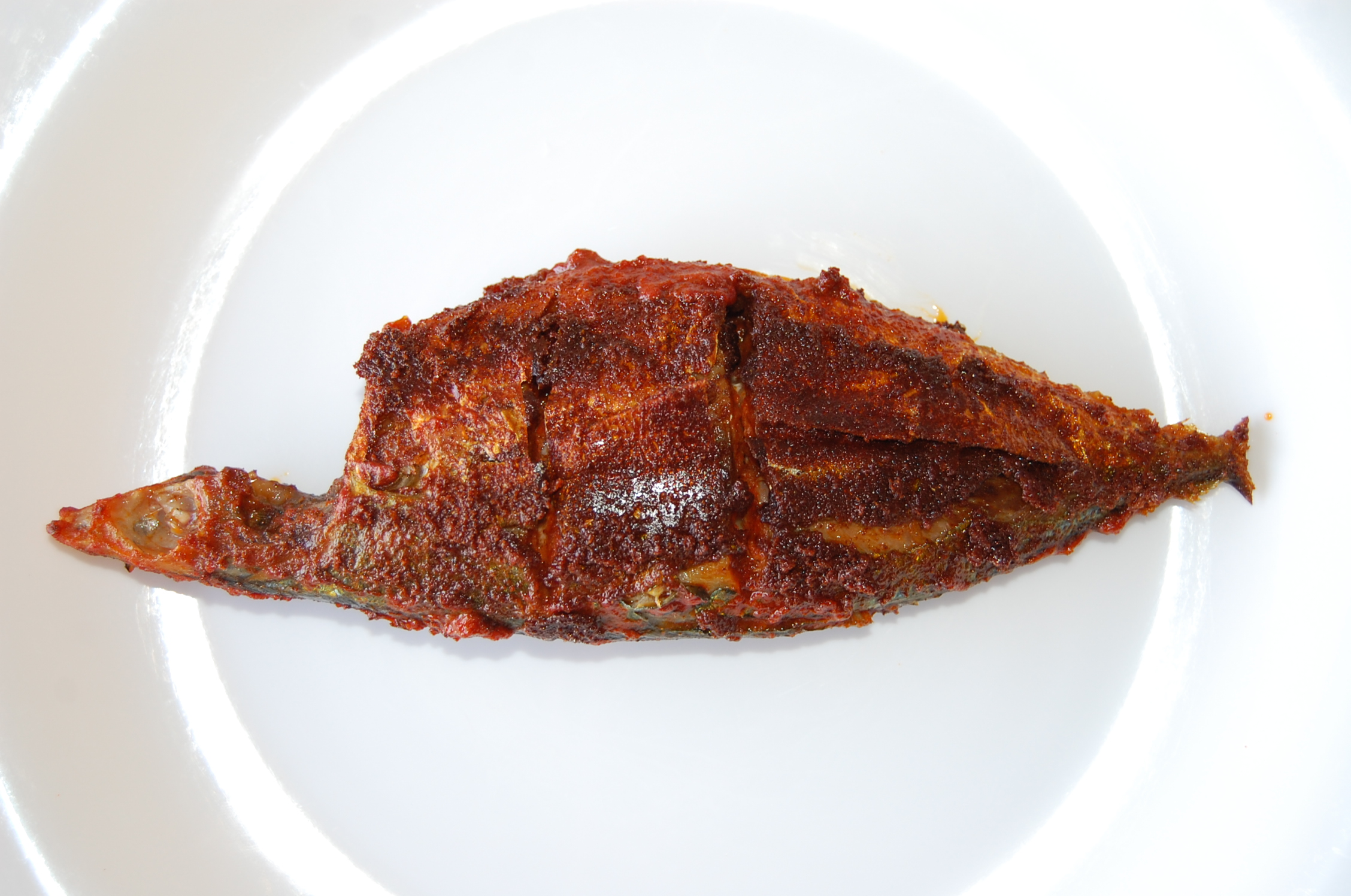
Fried Indian mackerel

Global capture production of Indian mackerel (Rastrelliger kanagurta) in thousand tonnes from 1950 to 2022, as reported by the FAO

The Indian mackerel or bigmouth mackerel (Rastrelliger kanagurta) is a species of mackerel in the family Scombridae. It is commonly found in the Indian and West Pacific oceans, and their surrounding seas. It is an important food fish and is commonly used in South and South-East Asian cuisine.

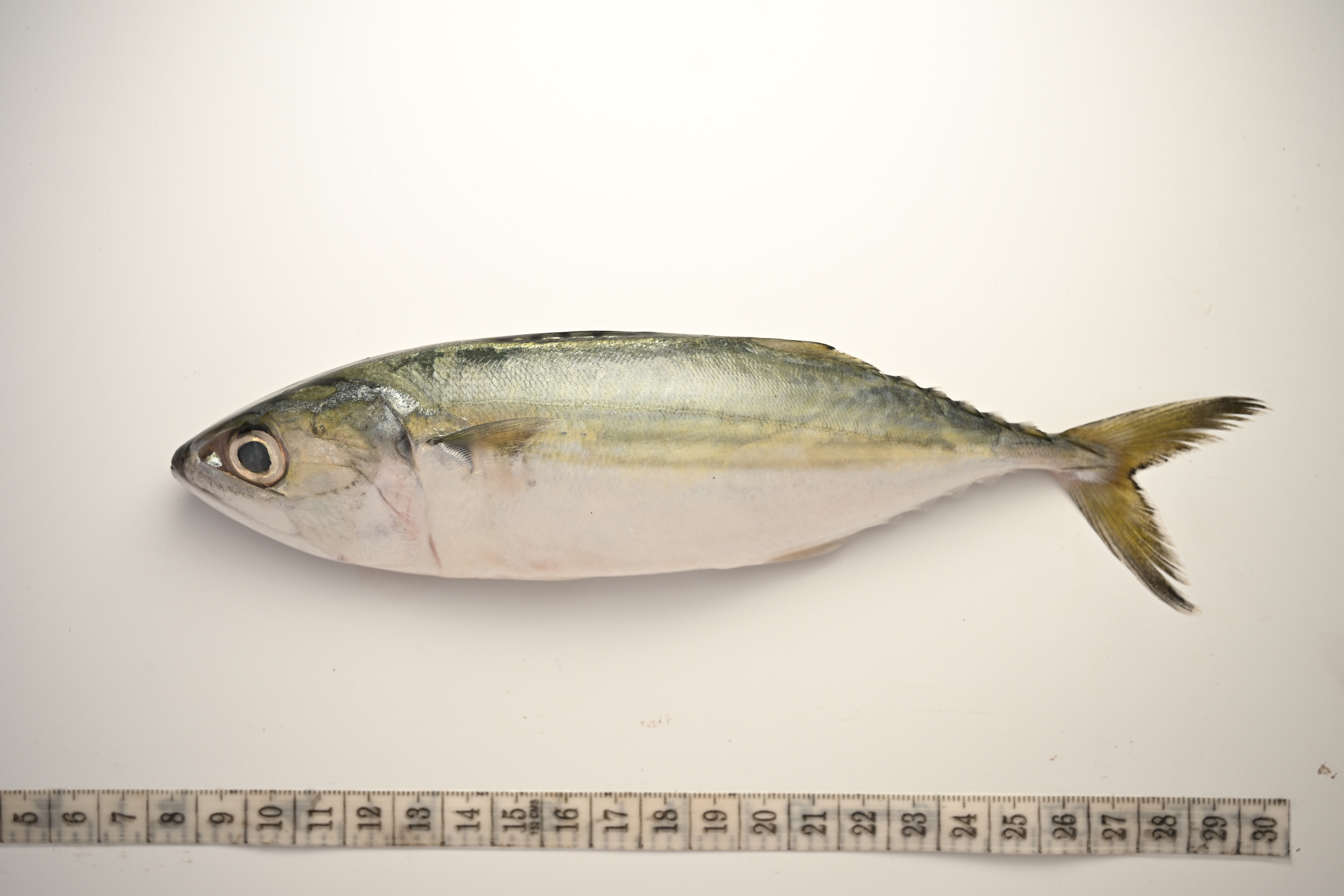
Rastrelliger kanagurta

It is known by various names, such as Pelaling in Malaysia, Kembung lelaki in Indonesia, Bangdo (बांगडो) in Konkani language, Bangdi (બાંગડી) in Gujarati, Bangda (बांगडा) in Marathi, Kajol Gouri (কাজল গৌরী) in Bengali, Ayla (അയല, ഐല) in Malayalam, Kankarta (କାନକରତା) in Odia, Kaanankeluthi (காணாங்கெலுத்தி) in Tamil, Kaanagadata(కానగడత) in Telugu, Kumbalawaa (කුම්බලාව) in Sinhala and Bangude (𑎨𑏌𑎔𑎻𑎞𑏂) in Tulu, as well as in Kannada (ಬಂಗುಡೆ). It is called alumahan in the Philippines.

== Distribution and habitat ==
The Indian mackerel is found in warm shallow waters along the coasts of the Indian and Western Pacific oceans. Its range extends from the Red Sea and East Africa in the west to Indonesia in the east, and from China and the Ryukyu Islands in the north to Australia, Melanesia and Samoa in the south. It has been reported on two occasions (1967, 2010) in the Mediterranean Sea off Gaza, a likely entry via the Suez Canal.

== Description ==
The body of the Indian mackerel is moderately deep, and the head is longer than the body depth. The maxilla are partly concealed, covered by the lacrimal bone, but extend till around the hind margin of the eye.

These fish have thin dark longitudinal bands on the upper part of the body, which may be golden on fresh specimens. There is also a black spot on the body near the lower margin of the pectoral fin. Dorsal fins are yellowish with black tips, while the caudal and pectoral fins are yellowish. The remaining fins are dusky.

Indian mackerel reach a maximum fork length of 35 cm (14 in), but are generally around 25 cm (9.8 in) in length.

== Habitat and diet ==
The Indian mackerel is generally found in shallow, coastal waters, where the surface water temperature is at least 17 °C (63 °F). Adults of this species are found in coastal bays, harbours and deep lagoons. They are commonly found in turbid waters rich in plankton.

Juveniles feed on phytoplankton like diatoms and small zooplankton including cladocerans and ostracods. As they mature, their intestines shorten, and their diet changes to primarily include macroplankton such as the larvae of shrimp and fish.

== Life history ==
The spawning season around India, which is in the northern hemisphere, is between March and September. Around Seychelles in the southern hemisphere, it is between September and the following March.

Spawning occurs in batches. The eggs are laid in the water and are externally fertilized. The Indian mackerel do not guard their eggs, which are left to develop on their own.
