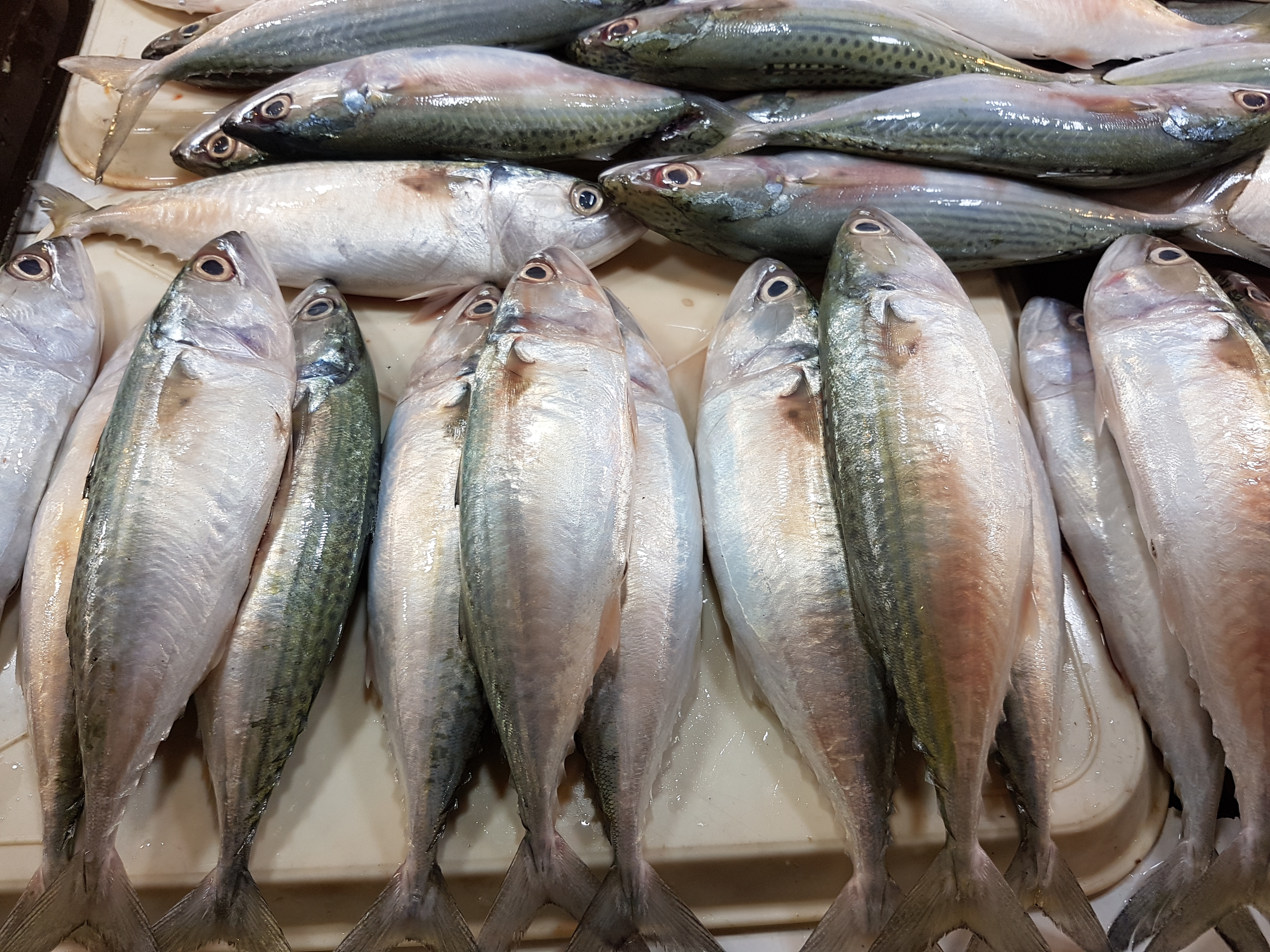
- Island mackerel in a fish market in the Philippines

Conservation status
- Vulnerable (IUCN 3.1)

Scientific classification
- Kingdom: Animalia
- Phylum: Chordata
- Class: Actinopterygii
- Order: Scombriformes
- Family: Scombridae
- Genus: Rastrelliger
- Species: R. faughni

Binomial name
- Rastrelliger faughni Matsui, 1967

= Island mackerel =

Species of fish

The island mackerel (Rastrelliger faughni) is a species of true mackerel in the scombrid family (Scombridae) from the Indo-Pacific. Their maximum reported length is 20 cm, and the maximum reported weight is 0.75 kg.

While the FAO report no commercial landings of island mackerel, the IUCN reports that it is a targeted fishery species. However, in the landings statistics, it is reported together with the other Rastrelliger species.
