= Palaeothunnus =

Palaeothunnus Temporal range: Thanetian

Scientific classification
- Kingdom: Animalia
- Phylum: Chordata
- Class: Actinopterygii
- Order: Scombriformes
- Family: Scombridae
- Genus: †Palaeothunnus; Bannikov, 1978

Extinct genus of fishes

Palaeothunnus is an extinct genus of prehistoric tuna that lived during the Thanetian stage of the Paleocene epoch.
