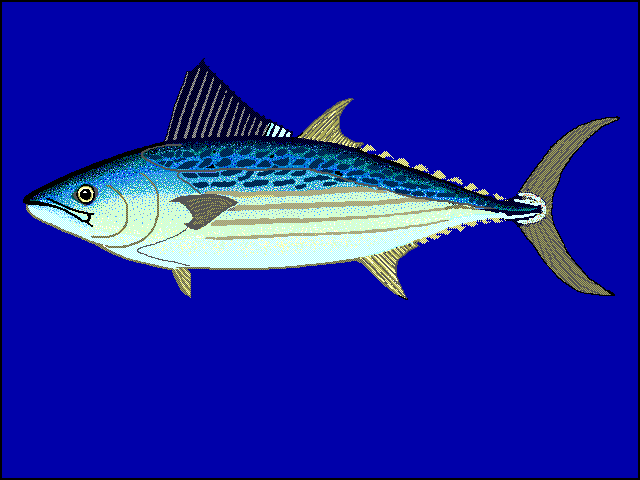
- Leaping bonito (Cybiosarda elegans)

Conservation status
- Least Concern (IUCN 3.1)

Scientific classification
- Kingdom: Animalia
- Phylum: Chordata
- Class: Actinopterygii
- Order: Scombriformes
- Family: Scombridae
- Genus: Cybiosarda (Whitley, 1935)
- Species: C. elegans

Binomial name
- Cybiosarda elegans (Whitley, 1935)
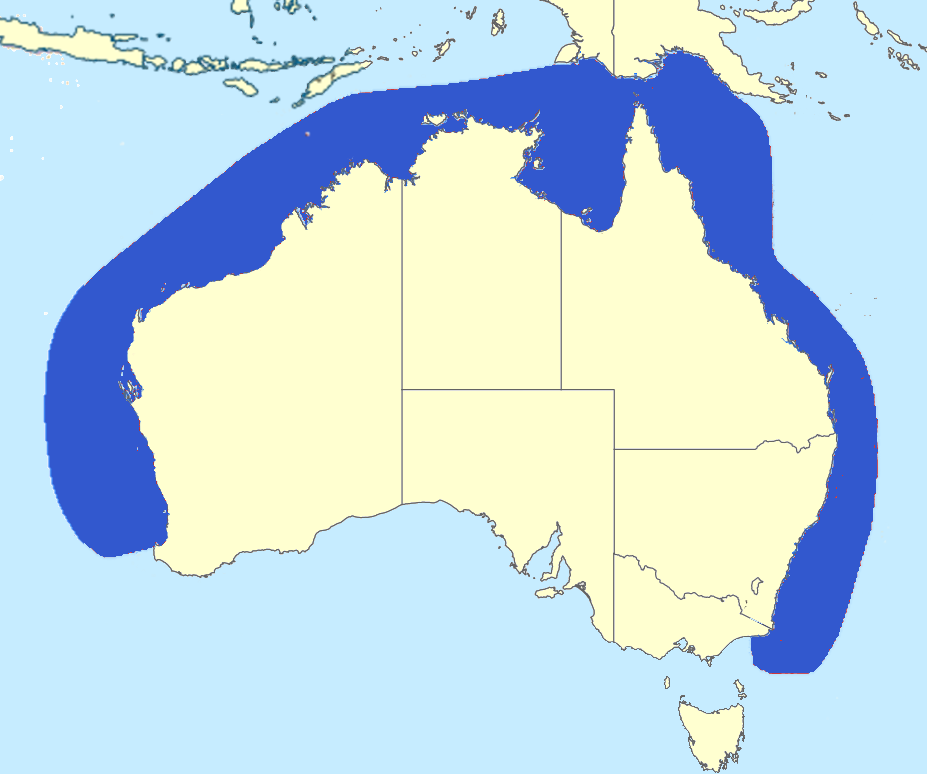

Synonyms
- Gymnosarda elegans (Whitley, 1935); Scomberomorus elegans Whitley, 1935

= Cybiosarda elegans =

Leaping bonito

Species of fish

The leaping bonito (Cybiosarda elegans) is a species of saltwater finfish from the Scombridae (Mackerel) family. Scombridae includes such tribes as the mackerels, tunas, and bonitos – of the latter of which, the Sardini tribe, this fish is a member. It is the only member of the genus Cybiosarda, which is therefore called a monotypic taxon.

Since the bonitos and tunas are close relatives, this fish has variously been referred to by such other common names as Australian tuna, striped bonito and Watson's bonito.

== Description ==
The leaping bonito, like other scombrids, has an elongated body with a deeply forked tail, and finlets. Like other tunas, it lacks a swim bladder.

The dorsal fin is very high, and the anterior of it is black. The back displays a spotted pattern with lots of dark, oval-like spots, with a deep blue undertone. The sides display striped marks which fade as they closer to the belly, similar to the related skipjack tuna (Katsuwonus pelamis) and black skipjack (Euthynnus lineatus). The second dorsal and anal fin are yellow.

It can reach 45 cm (18 in) in length and 2 kg (4.4 lb) in weight.

== Distribution and ecology ==
It is found in coastal and oceanic waters of northern Australia and southern New Guinea.

Like other tunas, it will travel in large schools to hunt down smaller fish, and may be found closer to shore following baitfish in winter months.
