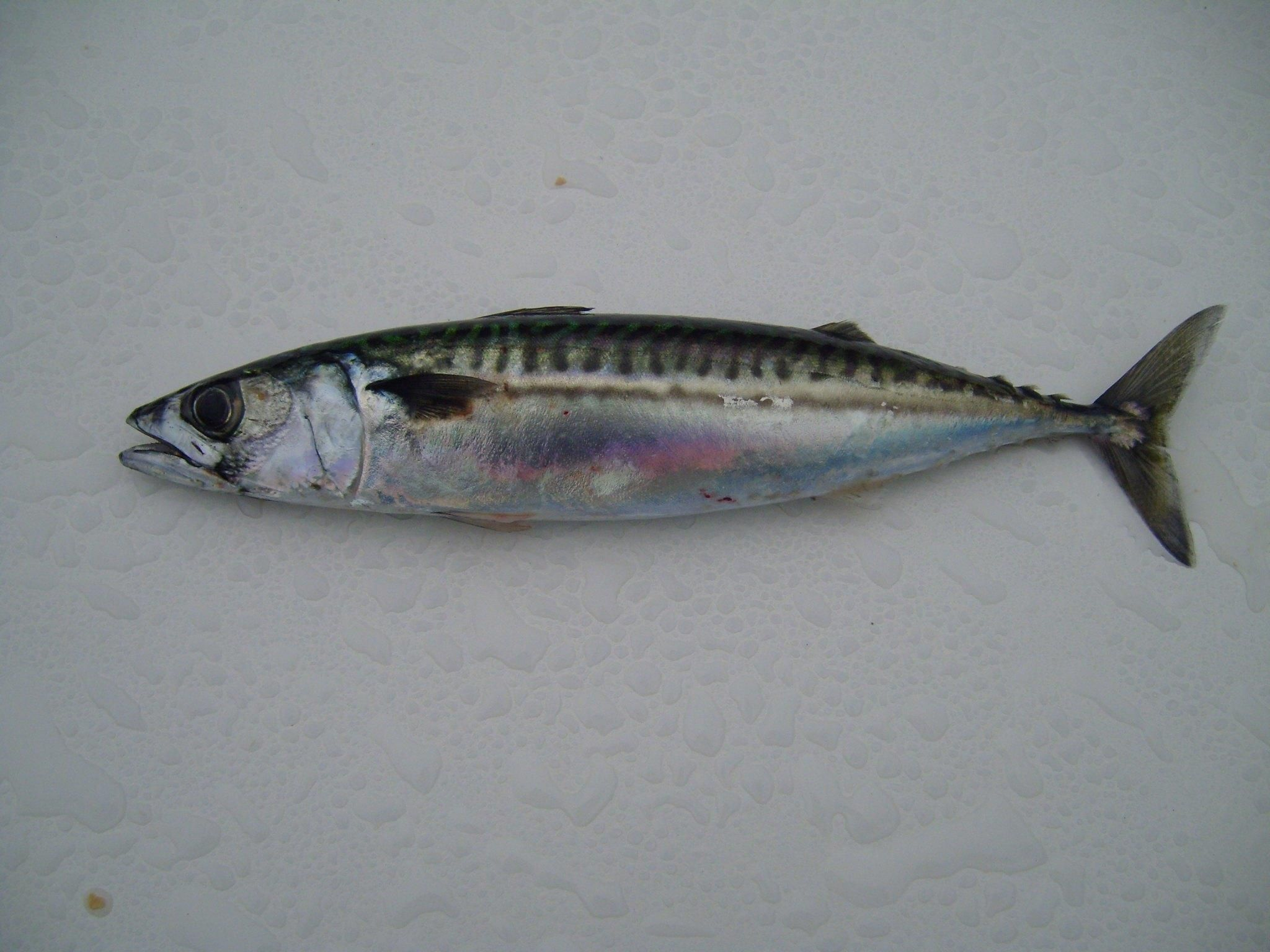
- Scomber scombrus

Scientific classification
- Kingdom: Animalia
- Phylum: Chordata
- Class: Actinopterygii
- Division: Teleostei
- Order: Scombriformes
- Family: Scombridae
- Tribe: Scombrini
- Genus: Scomber; Linnaeus, 1758

Type species
- Scomber scombrus Linnaeus, 1758

Species
- 4 species (see text)

= Scomber =

Scomber Temporal range: 34–0 Ma Late Eocene/Early Oligocene to present

Genus of ray-finned fishes

Scomber is a genus of ray-finned fish in the family Scombridae living in the open ocean found in Atlantic, Indian and Pacific Ocean. The genus Scomber and the genus Rastrelliger comprise the tribe Scombrini, known as the "true mackerels". These fishes have an elongated body, highly streamlined, muscular and agile. The eyes are large, the head is elongated, with a big mouth provided with teeth. They have two triangular dorsal fins, with some stabilizing fins along the caudal peduncle. The basic color is blue-green with a silvery white belly and a darker back, usually black mottled.

== Species ==
There are currently four recognized species in this genus:

- Scomber australasicus G. Cuvier, 1832 (Blue mackerel)
- Scomber colias J. F. Gmelin, 1789 (Atlantic chub mackerel)
- Scomber japonicus Houttuyn, 1782 (Chub mackerel)
- Scomber scombrus Linnaeus, 1758 (Atlantic mackerel)

Scomber indicus E. M. Abdussamad, Sukumaran & Ratheesh, 2016 (Indian chub mackerel) is a synonym of Scomber australasicus, although it can be recognized as a subspecies of the latter.

== Fossil record ==
Fossils of this genus are found from the Oligocene to the Pleistocene (33.9 to 1.806 million years ago). They are known from various localities of Europe, Siberia, Japan, Iran, and the western United States. The following fossil species are known:

- †Scomber antiquus Heckel in Heckel & Kner, 1861 – Miocene of Italy
- †Scomber calabrensis Landini & Bannikov, 1983 – Pliocene of Italy
- †Scomber chitaensis Ohe, 1993 – Middle Miocene of Aichi, Japan
- †Scomber collettei Bannikov & Erebakan, 2022 – lowermost Middle Miocene of the Krasnodar Region.
- †Scomber cubanicus Daniltshenko, 1960 – Upper Oligocene of Krasnodar Territory (Russia), as well as Azerbaijan
- †Scomber gnarus Bannikov, 1979 – Early Miocene of North Caucasus (Russia), Azerbaijan and Crimea (Ukraine)
- †Scomber priscus Gorjanovic-Kramberger, 1882 - Miocene of Serbia
- †Scomber nomurai Niino, 1951 – ?Miocene of Gunma, Japan
- †Scomber saadii Arambourg, 1967 – Late Eocene/Early Oligocene of Iran
- †Scomber sanctaemonicae (Jordan, 1919) – Late Miocene of California, USA
- †Scomber susedanus Steindachner, 1860 – Miocene of Croatia
- †Scomber voitestii Paucă, 1929 – Middle Oligocene of the Carpathian menilite slates, in Romania, Ukraine and Hungary
- S. sp. "A" – Early Oligocene of Germany
- S. sp. – Middle-Upper Miocene of the Kurasi Formation on Sakhalin.
