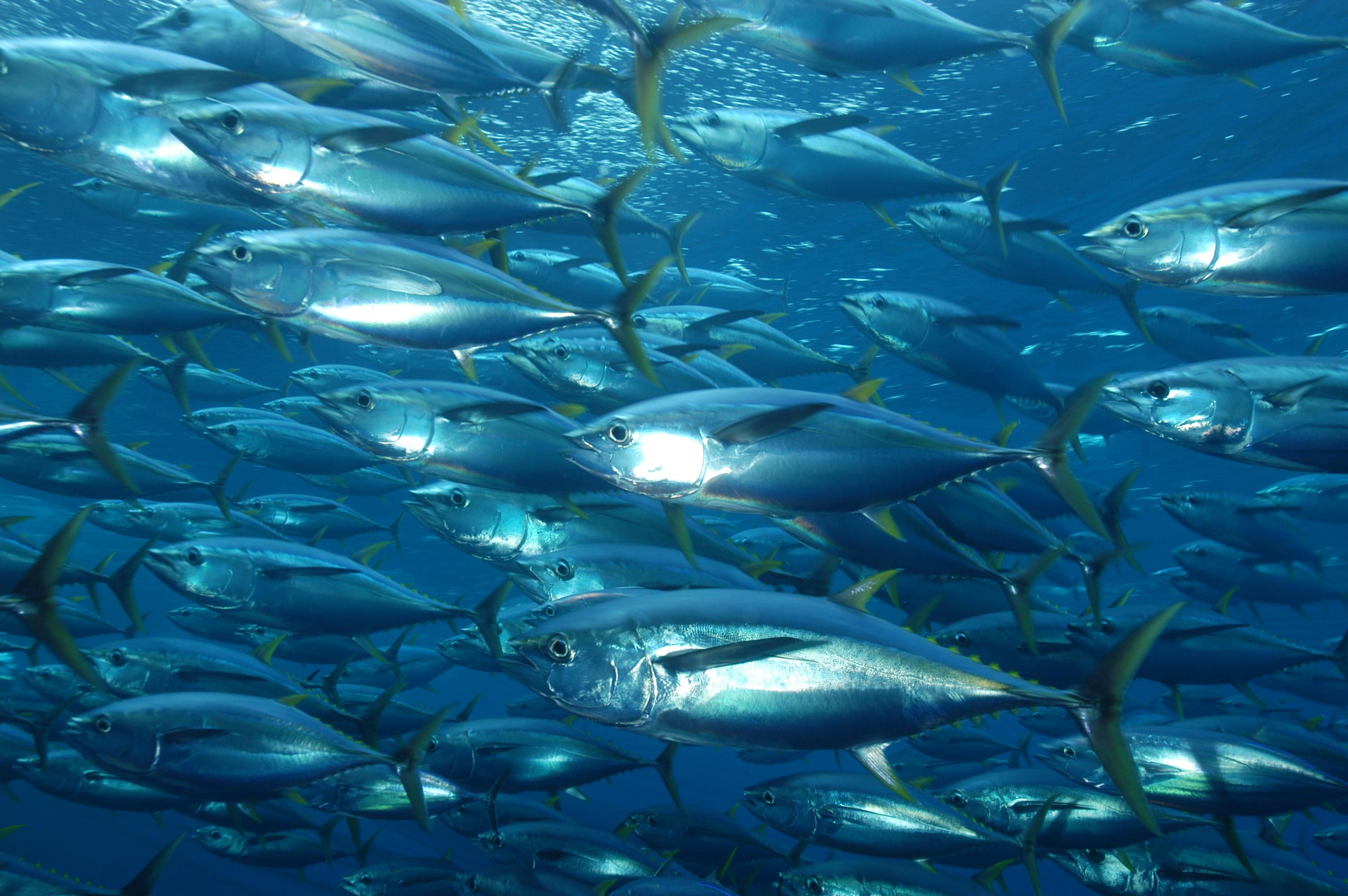
- Yellowfin tuna, Thunnus albacares

Scientific classification
- Kingdom: Animalia
- Phylum: Chordata
- Class: Actinopterygii
- Division: Teleostei
- Order: Scombriformes
- Suborder: Scombroidei
- Family: Scombridae; Rafinesque, 1815

Subfamilies
- Gasterochismatinae; Scombrinae

= Scombridae =

Scombridae Temporal range: Danian–present

Family of fishes

Scombridae is a family of marine ray-finned fish that consists of 51 extant species in 15 genera and two subfamilies, many of which are the most important and familiar commercial food fishes. All but one species are in the subfamily Scombrinae, which include mackerel, tuna and bonito; while the only exception is the butterfly kingfish, which is the sole member of subfamily Gasterochismatinae.

Scombrids have two dorsal fins and a series of finlets behind the rear dorsal fin and anal fin. The caudal fin is strongly divided and rigid, with a slender, ridged base. The first (spiny) dorsal fin and the pelvic fins are normally retracted into body grooves. Species lengths vary from the 20 cm (8 in) of the island mackerel to the 4.58 m (15 ft 1/2 in) recorded for the immense Atlantic bluefin tuna.

Scombrids are generally predators of the open ocean, and are found worldwide in tropical and temperate waters. They are capable of considerable speed, due to a highly streamlined body and retractable fins. Some members of the family, in particular the tunas, are notable for being partially endothermic (warm-blooded), a feature that also helps them to maintain high speed and activity. Other adaptations include a large amount of red muscle, allowing them to maintain activity over long periods. Scombrids like the yellowfin tuna can reach speeds of 22 km/h (12 knots).

== Classification ==
Jordan, Evermann, and Clark (1930) divide these fishes into the four families: Cybiidae, Katsuwonidae, Scombridae, and Thunnidae, but taxonomists later classified them all into a single family, the Scombridae.

The World Wildlife Fund and the Zoological Society of London jointly issued their "Living Blue Planet Report" on 16 September 2015 which states that a dramatic fall of 74% occurred in worldwide stocks of scombridae fish between 1970 and 2010, and the global overall "population sizes of mammals, birds, reptiles, amphibians and fish fell by half on average in just 40 years".

=== Extant genera ===
The 51 extant species are in 15 genera and two subfamilies – with the subfamily Scombrinae further grouped into four tribes, as:

Family Scombridae

- Subfamily Gasterochismatinae
  - Genus Gasterochisma
- Subfamily Scombrinae
  - Tribe Scombrini – mackerels
    - Genus Rastrelliger
    - Genus Scomber
  - Tribe Scomberomorini – Spanish mackerels
    - Genus Acanthocybium
    - Genus Grammatorcynus
    - Genus Orcynopsis
    - Genus Scomberomorus
  - Tribe Sardini – bonitos
    - Genus Sarda
    - Genus Cybiosarda
    - Genus Gymnosarda
  - Tribe Thunnini – tunas
    - Genus Allothunnus
    - Genus Auxis
    - Genus Euthynnus
    - Genus Katsuwonus
    - Genus Thunnus

The following cladograms are based on phylogenies of Scombridae:

- Scombridae
  - Gasterochismatinae
    Butterfly kingfishes (1 genus)
  - Scombrinae
    - - - Scombrini
          Mackerels (2 genera)
      - - - Scomberomorini
            Spanish Mackerels (3 genera)
        - - - Sardini
              Bonitos (4 genera)
            - Thunnini (Tunas)
              - Allothunnus, slender tunas
              - - Auxis, frigate tunas
                - - Euthynnus, little tunas
                  - - Katsuwonus, skipjack tunas
                    - Thunnus, true tunas

- Gasterochisma melampus
- - - Grammatorcynus
    - - Rastrelliger
      - Scomber
  - - - Acanthocybium solandri
      - Scomberomorus
    - - Gymnosarda unicolor
      - - Sarda
        - - - Allothunnus fallai
            - Cybiosarda elegans
          - - - - Katsuwonus pelamis
                - Auxis
              - Euthynnus
            - Thunnus

Top: Graham et al.'s morphological analysis

Bottom: Brownstein et al.'s analysis of genomes and UCEs

=== Fossil genera ===
The following fossil genera are known:

- Genus †Aramichthys (fossil; middle Eocene of Syria)
- Genus †Eoscomber (fossil; early Eocene of Senegal)
- Genus †Eoscombrus (fossil; late Eocene of California)
- Genus †Godsilia (fossil; early Eocene of Italy)
- Genus †Pseudauxides (fossil; early Eocene of Italy)
- Genus †Scombrinus (fossil; early Eocene of England)
- Genus †Thunnoscomberoides (fossil; early Eocene of Italy)
- Genus †Wetherellus (fossil; early Eocene of England)
- Subfamily Scombrinae
  - Genus †Tamesichthys (early Eocene of England)
  - Genus †Mioscomber (middle Miocene of the North Caucasus (Russia) and Croatia)
  - Tribe †Eocoelopomini
    - Genus †Eocoelopoma (early Eocene of England & Turkmenistan)
    - Genus ?†Landanichthys (fossil; middle Paleocene of Angola)
    - Genus †Palaeothunnus (early Eocene of Turkmenistan)
    - Genus †Micrornatus (early Eocene of England)
  - Tribe Scomberomorini
    - Genus †Caucombrus (Early Oligocene of the North Caucasus (Russia) and Germany)
    - Genus †Neocybium (Late Eocene of Kazakhstan, Early Oligocene of Germany & Georgia)
    - Genus †Palaeocybium (fossil; Eocene to Oligocene of the United States and parts of Europe)
  - Tribe Scombrini
    - Genus †Auxides (early Eocene of Senegal, Turkmenistan, and much of Europe) (=Scombrosarda)

== See also ==
- Scombroid food poisoning
- Mackerel as food
