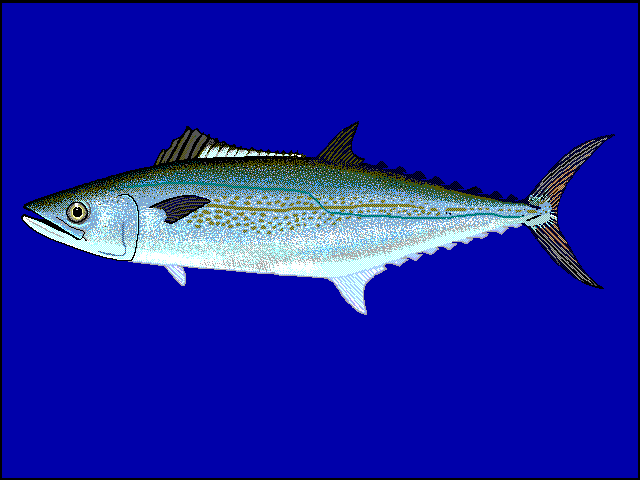
- Cero mackerel, Scomberomorus regalis

Scientific classification
- Kingdom: Animalia
- Phylum: Chordata
- Class: Actinopterygii
- Division: Teleostei
- Order: Scombriformes
- Family: Scombridae
- Subfamily: Scombrinae
- Tribe: Scomberomorini; Starks, 1910

Genera
- Acanthocybium (Gill, 1862); Grammatorcynus (Gill, 1862); Scomberomorus (Lacépède, 1801)

= Spanish mackerel =

Spanish mackerels

Tribe of fishes

Scomberomorini is a tribe of ray-finned, saltwater, bony fishes that is commonly known as Spanish mackerels, seerfishes, or seer fish. This tribe is a subset of the mackerel family (Scombridae), which it shares with four sister tribes, the tunas, mackerels, bonitos, and butterfly kingfish. Scomberomorini comprises 21 species across three genera. They are pelagic fish, fast swimmers and predatory in nature, that fight vigorously when caught. They are mainly caught using hooks and lines.

== Taxonomy ==
The following cladogram shows the most likely evolutionary relationships between the Spanish mackerels and the tunas, mackerels, bonitos, and butterfly kingfish.

The Spanish mackerels, in the family Scombridae

- family Scombridae
  - subfamily
    - Gasterochismatinae
      - - genusGasterochisma
          - butterfly kingfish
  - subfamily
    - Scombrinae
      - - - - - tribe Scombrini
                - - mackerels (two genera)
        - - - - tribeScomberomorini
                - Spanish mackerels(three genera)
          - - - tribe Sardini
                - - - bonitos (four genera)
            - - tribe Thunnini
                - - - tunas (five genera)

Cladogram showing the relationship of the tribe Scomberomorini with the rest of the family Scombridae.

This tribe comprises 21 species in three genera:

- Acanthocybium (Gill, 1862)
  - A. solandri (Cuvier, 1832), wahoo
- Grammatorcynus (Gill, 1862)
  - G. bicarinatus (Quoy & Gaimard, 1825), shark mackerel
  - G. bilineatus (Rüppell, 1836), double-lined mackerel
- Scomberomorus (Lacépède, 1801)
  - S. brasiliensis Collette, Russo & Zavala-Camin, 1978, Serra Spanish mackerel
  - S. cavalla (Cuvier, 1829), king mackerel
  - S. commerson (Lacépède, 1800), narrow-barred Spanish mackerel
  - S. concolor (Lockington, 1879), Monterrey Spanish mackerel
  - S. guttatus (Bloch & Schneider, 1801), Indo-Pacific king mackerel
  - S. koreanus (Kishinouye, 1915), Korean seerfish
  - S. lineolatus (Cuvier, 1829), streaked seerfish
  - S. maculatus (Mitchill, 1815), Atlantic Spanish mackerel
  - S. multiradiatus Munro, 1964, Papuan seerfish
  - S. munroi Collette & Russo, 1980, Australian spotted mackerel
  - S. niphonius (Cuvier, 1832), Japanese Spanish mackerel
  - S. plurilineatus Fourmanoir, 1966, Kanadi kingfish
  - S. queenslandicus Munro, 1943, Queensland school mackerel
  - S. regalis (Bloch, 1793), Cero mackerel
  - S. semifasciatus (Macleay, 1883), broadbarred king mackerel
  - S. sierra Jordan & Starks, 1895, Pacific sierra
  - S. sinensis (Lacépède, 1800), Chinese seerfish
  - S. tritor (Cuvier, 1832), West African Spanish mackerel

== See also ==
- Mackerel as food
