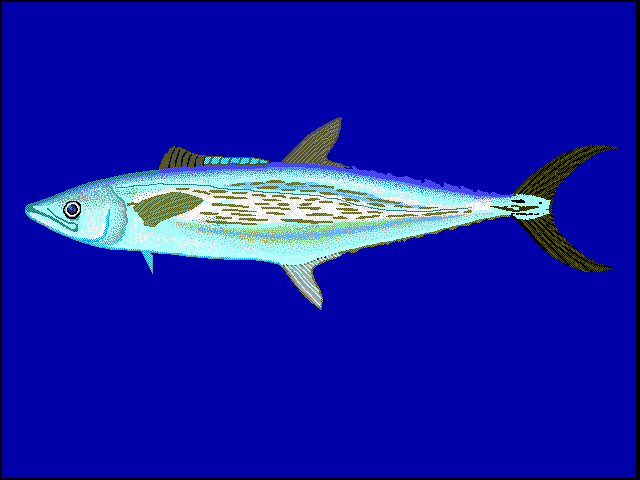

Conservation status
- Least Concern (IUCN 3.1)

Scientific classification
- Kingdom: Animalia
- Phylum: Chordata
- Class: Actinopterygii
- Order: Scombriformes
- Family: Scombridae
- Genus: Scomberomorus
- Species: S. lineolatus

Binomial name
- Scomberomorus lineolatus (Cuvier, 1829)

Synonyms
- Cybium lineolatum Cuvier, 1829; Indocybium lineolatum (Cuvier, 1829)

= Streaked Spanish mackerel =

Species of fish

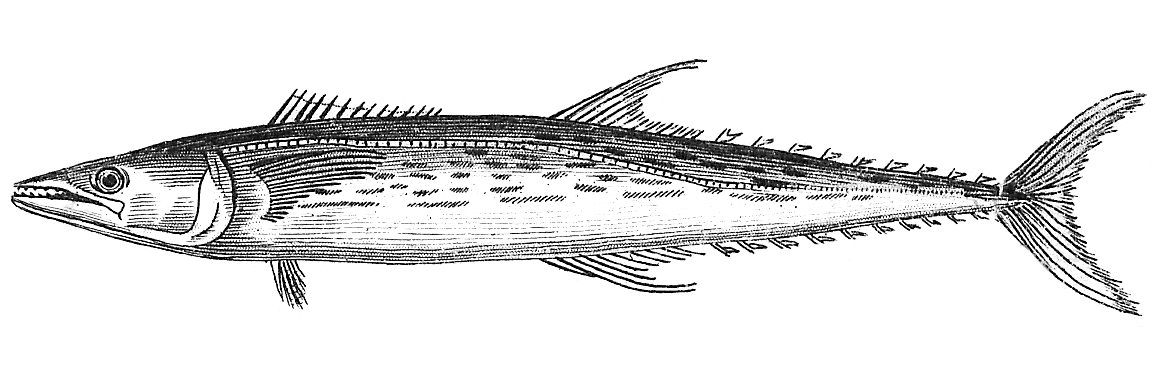
Illustration of Scomberomorus lineolatus

The streaked Spanish mackerel (Scomberomorus lineolatus), also known as the queen mackerel, streaked seer, or streaked seerfish, is a species of Spanish mackerel found in the Indian Ocean.

It is also known by other names, such as hazard (French), sawara, and carite (Spanish), although these names may also be used to describe other Spanish mackerel. It is an important quarry species for fisheries where it occurs.

== Taxonomy ==
The fish was first described by Georges Cuvier, a french naturalist, in 1829.

There is a debate surrounding the origin of the species, with some citing it as a valid species, while others have theorized it is a natural hybrid between the narrow-barred Spanish mackerel (S. commerson) and the Indo-Pacific king mackerel (S. guttatus). However, as it possesses a unique short-lined pattern, the hybridization theory is unlikely.

== Description ==
Like other fish in Scomberomorus, it has a streamlined, elongated, body, a deeply forked tail, and no swim bladder. The body is a darker blue-grey on the back, and becomes silver near the belly. The anterior of the first dorsal fin is black, and the finlets and other fins are grey. It has small scales and sharp teeth, effective for preying on fish.

Compared to all other species of Spanish mackerel, it possesses a unique short-lined pigment pattern, making it easier to identify.

S. lineolatus can reach up to 98 cm (39 in) and weigh 4.1 kg (9.0 lb). The oldest recorded specimen was 7 years old.

== Range ==
The streaked seerfish is found off Asian coasts from the west coast of India, especially along the Maharashtra and Gujarat coasts (Northeastern coast of India), and Sri Lanka to Eastern Java, and does not extend east of Wallace's Line. It is also found in the Gulf of Thailand and southern areas of the South China Sea.

== Natural history ==
S. lineolatus feeds almost exclusively on fish from Sardinella (sardines) and Anchoviella (anchovies). It lives a pelagic-neritic lifestyle, usually staying near the continental shelf. The fish usually spawns between January and July. They usually mature between one and two years of age, when they are between 40 and 52 cm (16 and 20 in). Males mature a bit sooner than females.

== Fishery ==
The streaked spanish mackerel is of major commercial fishery importance in the regions where it is found. It is commonly caught mixed in with other Spanish mackerels, being caught with longlines, on hook and line, or in sienes. The peak season for fishing is from October to December, although this depends on the region.

== See also ==
- Mackerel as food
