= Sawara =

Sawara may refer to:

== Locations in Japan ==
- Sawara, Chiba
- Sawara, Hokkaido
- Sawara, Fukuoka
- Sawara-ku, Fukuoka
- Sawara District, Fukuoka (ja:早良郡), former administrative region in the Chikuzen Province
- Sawara Station passenger railway station

== People ==
- Sawara clan (佐原氏), an influential Japanese family
- Prince Sawara (早良親王), Japanese prince and son of Emperor Kōnin
- Sawara no Kinsaburō (佐原 喜三郎), knight-errant from the Edo period
- Megumi Sawara (早良 めぐみ), Japanese actress and fashion model
- Morizumi Sawara (佐原 盛純), Japanese sinologist
- Tokusuke Sawara (佐原 篤介), journalist from the Meiji period
- Wakako Sawara (佐原 若子; born 1953), Japanese politician and dentist

== Other ==
- Sawara Cypress, a species of coniferous tree
- Japanese Spanish mackerel and Atlantic Spanish mackerel, two species of saltwater fish called "sawara" on sushi menus
