= Sea Witch =

The sea witch is a recurring theme in coastal and seafaring folklore, a witch lurking in the waters.

Sea Witch may also refer to:

- Sea Witch (1848 barque), British opium clipper
- Sea Witch (clipper), American ship launched 1846
- Sea Witch (container ship), launched 1968
- Sea Witch (Delaware), a local legend and festival
- Sea Witch (lure), an artificial fishing lure first produced 1925
- MS Sea Witch, cargo ship launched 1940
