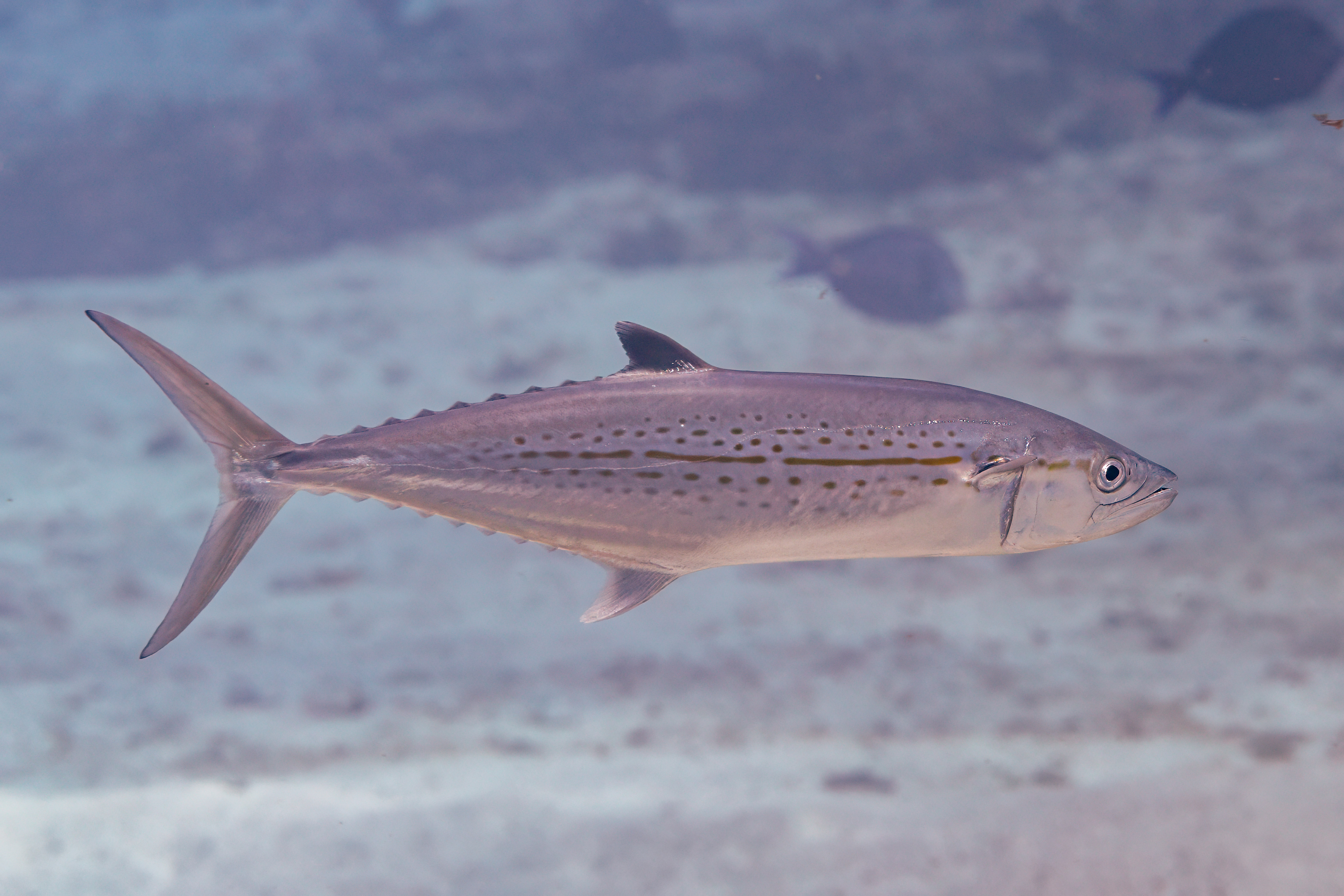
- Scomberomorus regalis

Scientific classification
- Kingdom: Animalia
- Phylum: Chordata
- Class: Actinopterygii
- Division: Teleostei
- Order: Scombriformes
- Family: Scombridae
- Subfamily: Scombrinae
- Tribe: Scomberomorini
- Genus: Scomberomorus; Lacépède, 1801

Type species
- S. plumierii Lacépède, 1801

Species
- See text.

Synonyms
- List: Apodontis Bennett, 1832; Apolectus Bennett, 1831; Chriomitra Lockington, 1879; Cybium Cuvier, 1829; Indocybium Munro, 1943; Polipturus Rafinesque, 1815; Pseudosawara Munro, 1943; Sawara Jordan & Hubbs, 1925; Sierra Fowler, 1905

= Scomberomorus =

Scomberomorus Temporal range: Earliest Eocene to present

Genus of fishes

Scomberomorus is a genus of ray-finned bony fish in the mackerel family, Scombridae. More specifically, it is a member of the tribe Scomberomorini, commonly known as the Spanish mackerels.

== Species ==
Scomberomorus includes 19 extant species:

- Arabian sparrow seer, S. avirostrus Abdussamad, Toji, Margaret, Mini, Rajesh, Azeez, Vinothkumar, Retheesh, Abbas, Shihab, Sneha, Prathibha & Gopalakrishnan, 2023
- Serra Spanish mackerel, S. brasiliensis Collette, Russo & Zavala-Camin, 1978
- King mackerel, S. cavalla (Cuvier, 1829)
- Narrow-barred Spanish mackerel, S. commerson (Lacépède, 1800)
- Monterrey Spanish mackerel, S. concolor (Lockington, 1879)
- Indo-Pacific king mackerel, S. guttatus (Bloch & Schneider, 1801)
- Korean seerfish, S. koreanus (Kishinouye, 1915)
- S. leopardus (Shaw, 1803)
- Streaked seerfish, S. lineolatus (Cuvier, 1829)
- Atlantic Spanish mackerel, S. maculatus (Couch, 1832)
- Papuan seerfish, S. multiradiatus Munro, 1964
- Australian spotted mackerel, S. munroi Collette & Russo, 1980
- Japanese Spanish mackerel, S. niphonius (Cuvier, 1832)
- Kanadi kingfish, S. plurilineatus Fourmanoir, 1966
- Queensland school mackerel, S. queenslandicus Munro, 1943
- Cero mackerel, S. regalis (Bloch, 1793)
- Broadbarred king mackerel, S. semifasciatus (Macleay, 1883)
- Pacific sierra, S. sierra Jordan & Starks, 1895
- Chinese seerfish, S. sinensis (Lacépède, 1800)
- West African Spanish mackerel, S. tritor (Cuvier, 1832)

=== Fossil record ===
The following fossil species are known:

- †Scomberomorus avitus Bannikov, 1985 - earliest Eocene (Ypresian) of Turkmenistan
- †Scomberomorus bleekeri (Storms, 1897) - middle Eocene of Belgium, early to middle Eocene of the eastern United States (Alabama, Virginia, New Jersey)
- †Scomberomorus dumonti (van Beneden, 1871) - Early Oligocene of Belgium & France
- †Scomberomorus lingulatus (von Meyer, 1847) - Early Oligocene of France & Germany
- †Scomberomorus saevus Bannikov, 1982 - late Eocene (Priabonian) of Kazakhstan
- †Scomberomorus stormsi (Leriche, 1905) - middle Eocene of Belgium, early to middle Eocene of the eastern United States (Alabama, Virginia, New Jersey)

The fossil species S. bartonensis (Woodward, 1901) and S. excelsus (Woodward, 1901) from the early Eocene-aged London Clay are known from non-diagnostic material and thus their status as distinct species is uncertain, although they are at least considered a representative of the genus as Scomberomorus "sp. 1". Another undescribed fossil Scomberomorus known from indeterminate remains is S. "sp. 2" from the Early Miocene of Malta.

== As food ==
Scomberomorus are consumed in Taiwan and Chaoshan as Majiao Yu (simplified Chinese: 马鲛鱼; traditional Chinese: 馬鮫魚) or Tutuo Yu (Chinese: 土魠魚), often prepared pan-fried or deep-fried and then served with soup. In Jiaodong Peninsula, they are known as Ba Yu (Chinese: 鲅鱼) and used as fillings in dumplings. In Japan, they are known as Sawara (サワラ) and often prepared grilled or as Sashimi.

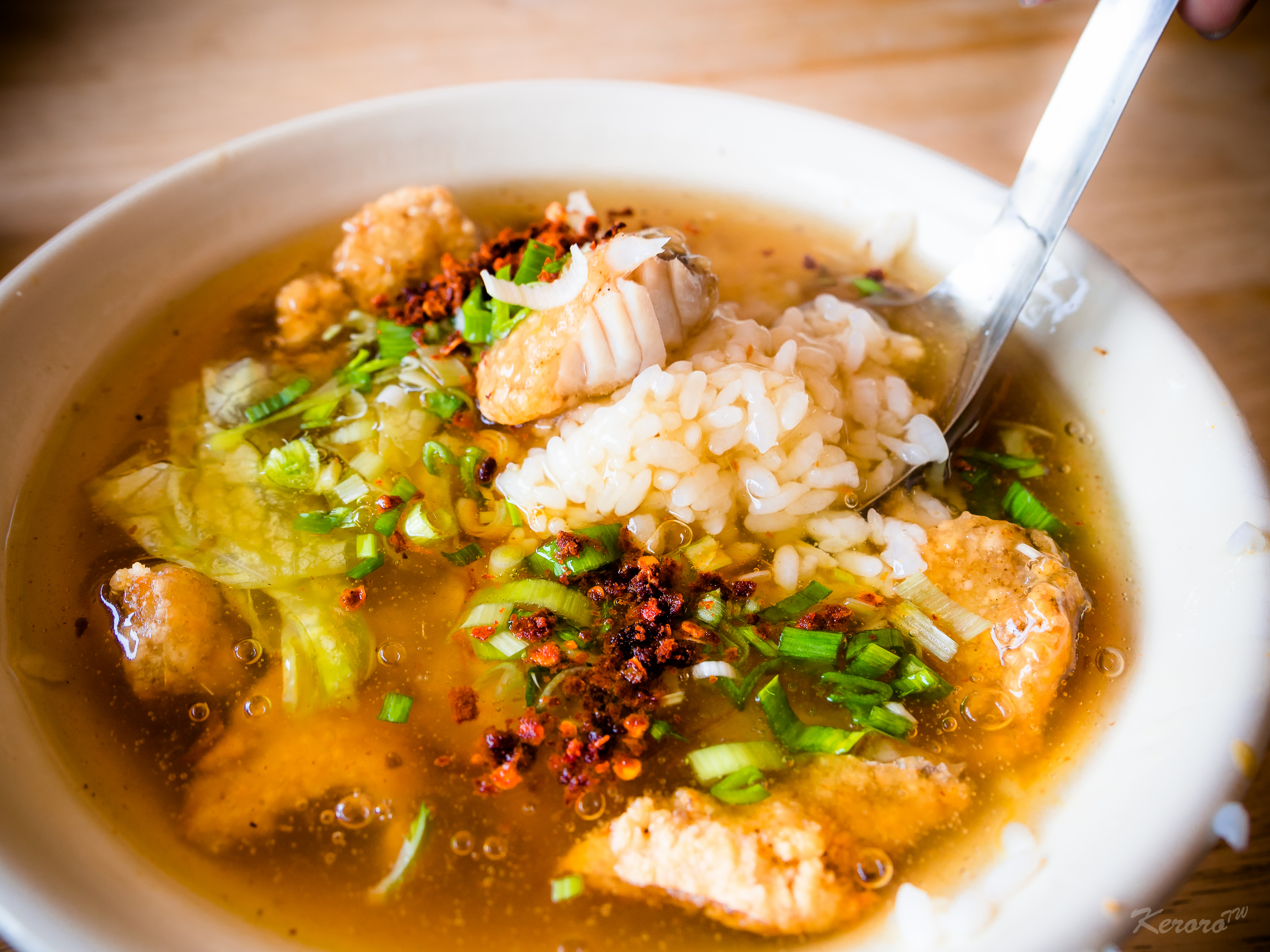
Scomberomorus soup in Tainan

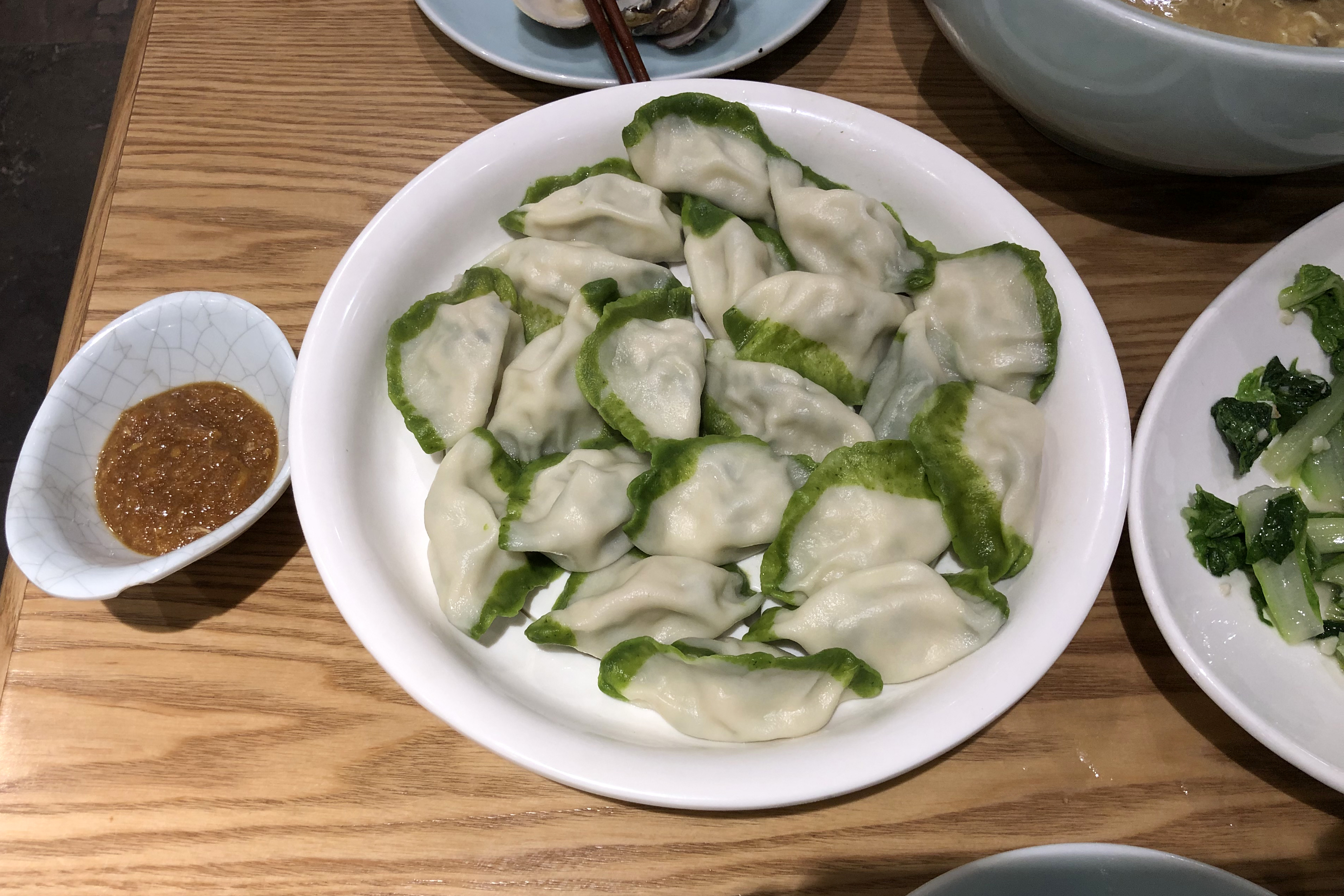
Ba Yu dumplings

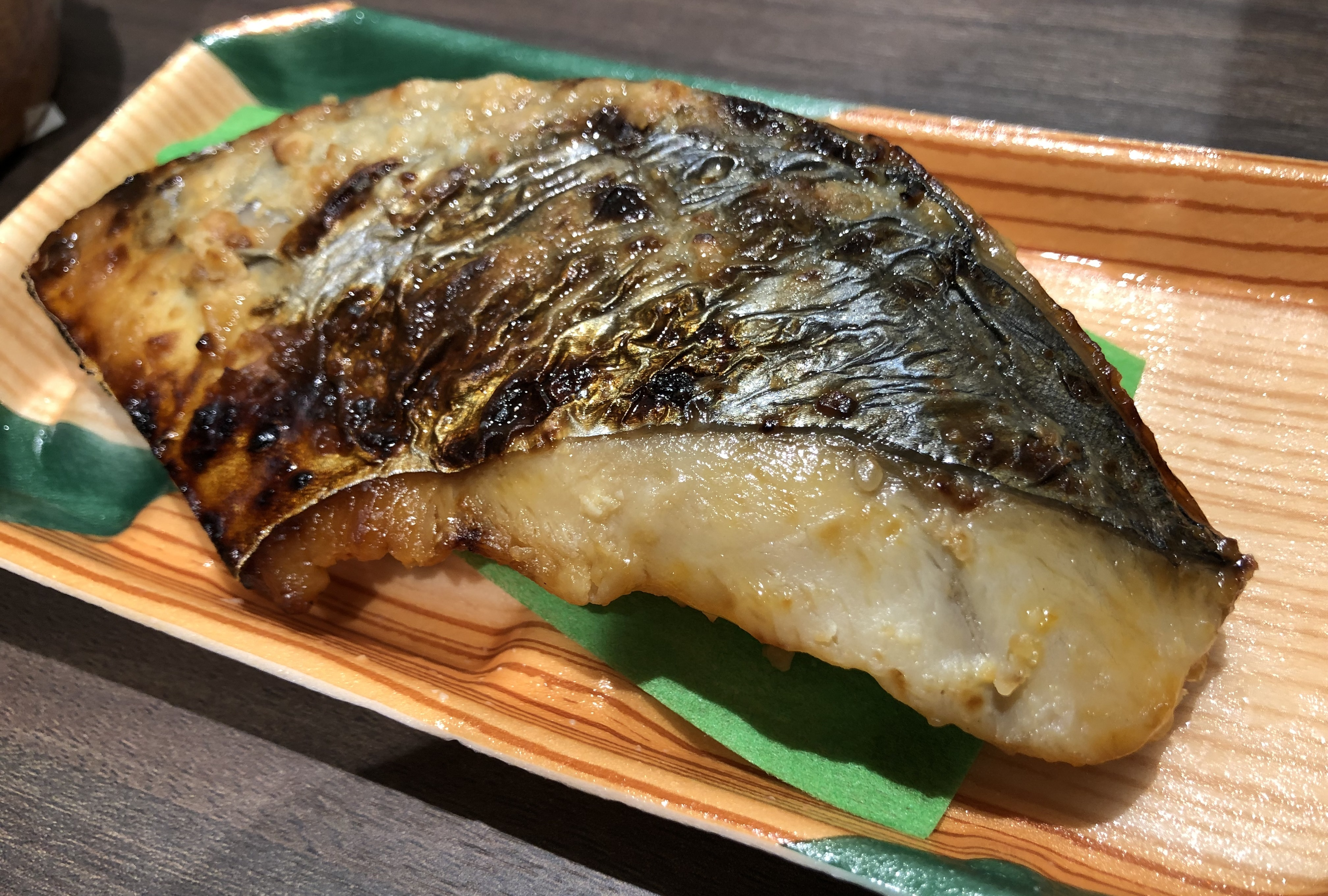
Sawara Saikyoyaki
