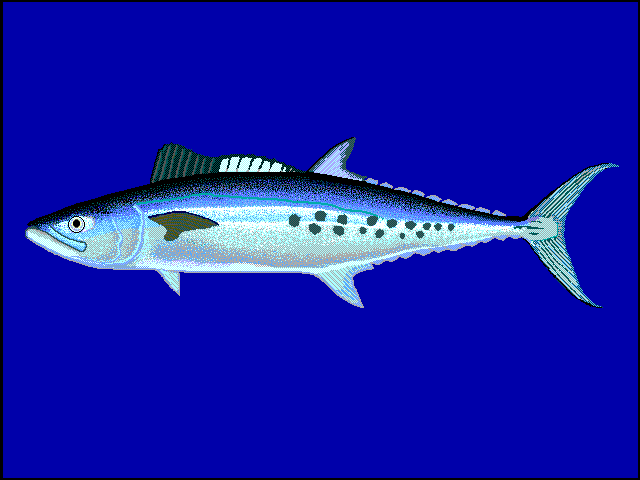

Conservation status
- Least Concern (IUCN 3.1)

Scientific classification
- Kingdom: Animalia
- Phylum: Chordata
- Class: Actinopterygii
- Order: Scombriformes
- Family: Scombridae
- Genus: Scomberomorus
- Species: S. queenslandicus

Binomial name
- Scomberomorus queenslandicus Munro, 1943
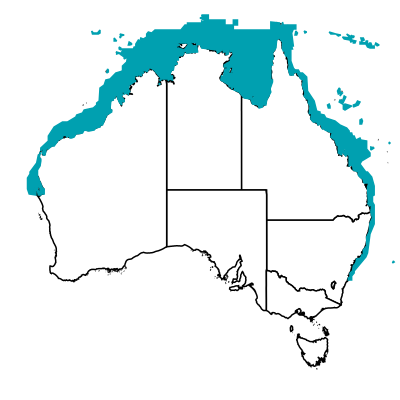
- Map of the range of Scomberomorus queenslandicus in Australian waters

= Queensland school mackerel =

Species of fish

The Queensland school mackerel (Scomberomorus queenslandicus), is a species of fish in the family Scombridae and is part of the genus scomberomorus, the Spanish mackerels. It also known as the school mackerel, doggie mackerel, or shiny mackerel.

== Description ==
The Queensland School Mackerel resembles other Spanish mackerels, with an elongated and highly compressed body, with a deeply forked tail. Like other Scrombridaes, it lacks a swim bladder. The coloration of the first is a blue-ish green, with the stomach being lighter in color. The front of the first dorsal fin, as well as the very end of it, is jet black. The anal fin and finlets are white. It displays a spotted pattern, with large black to grey colored blotches either throughout the body or only in small patches. After the fish is caught, these spots tend to become faint.

These fish have been recorded at up to 100 cm (39 in) in fork length, and weighing up to 12.2 kg (27 lb), although they are commonly 80 cm (31 in). Females grow larger but slower than males, and they can live up to 10 years.

The Queensland school mackerel can be distinguished from the Australian spotted mackerel (Scomberomorus munroi) as the spots are considerably larger, as well as the darker color on the dorsal fin.

== Range ==
Queensland mackerel are found in tropical waters of the Western Pacific, largely confined to inshore coastal waters of southern Papua New Guinea and northern and eastern Australia, from Shark Bay and Onslow, Western Australia to Sydney, New South Wales.

== Biology and ecology ==
Queensland school mackerel live an epipelagic lifestyle over continental shelves. They commonly occur in waters down to 100 m (330 ft), usually to 30 m (98 ft), in depth. They prefer inshore waters, within 1 km (0.62 mi) of a reef or rocky area. They can also be found in bays and estuaries while following baitfish, especially during austral spring and winter . Queensland mackerel have been known to school with other species of Spanish mackerel, notably narrow-barred Spanish mackerel (S. commerson).

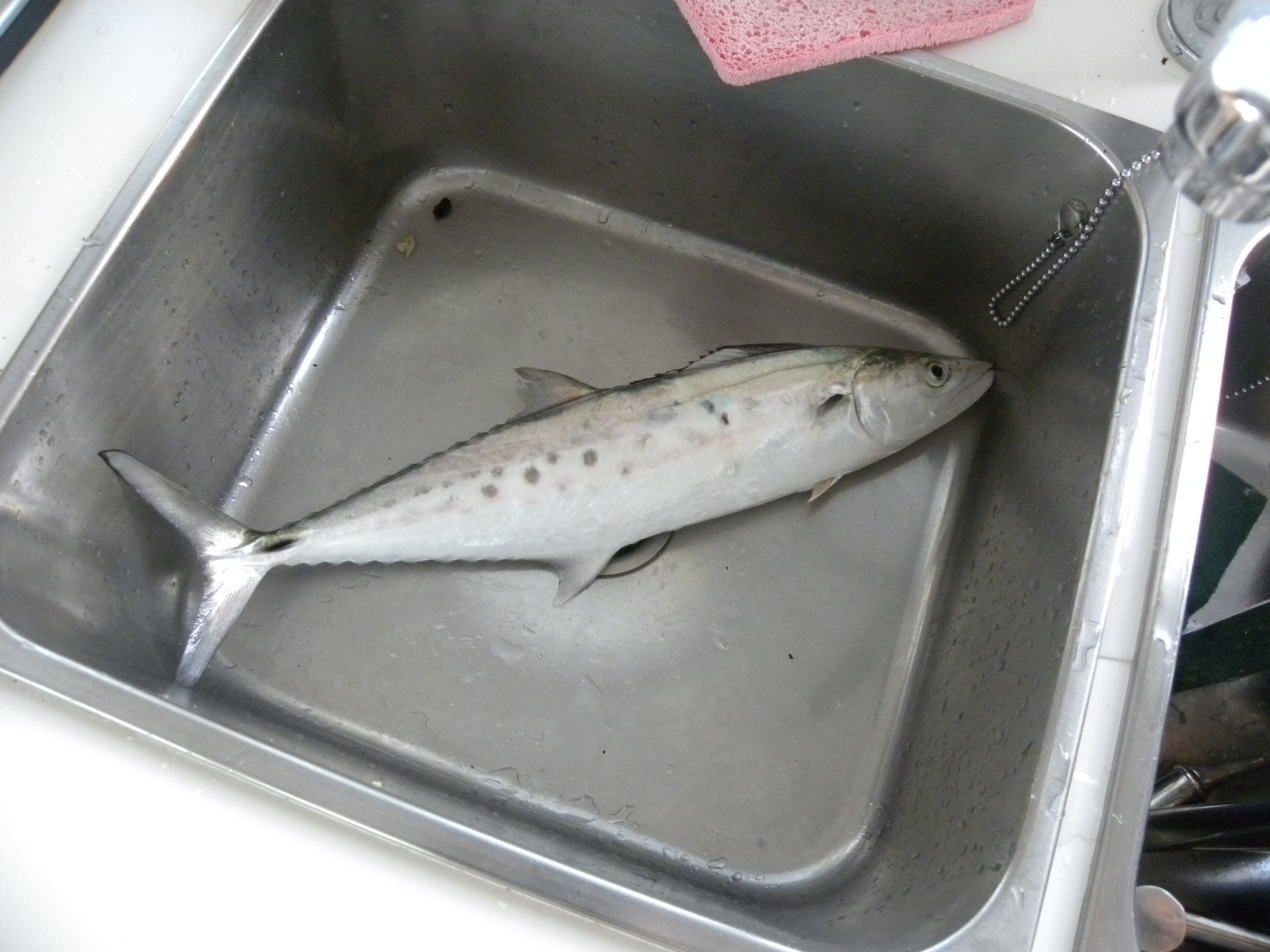
A recently caught Queensland school mackerel in a sink

Females mature between 40 and 46 cm (16 and 18 in) while males mature between 35 and 40 cm (14 and 16 in) fork length. Spawning occurs between October and January, by releasing pelagic eggs.

The diet of this species includes clupeoids (herring, menhaden, etc) and anchovies. Larval fish eat other larval fish and planktonic invertebrates.

== Relation to humans ==
This species is popular in recreational fishing using trolling methods and is prized as table fare. It is caught in commercial fisheries using gillnets, often while targeting other species of Spanish mackerel. They are commonly sold fresh in markets as fish steaks, and may be used in nigiri sushi. As a predator in coral reef ecosystems, there is a possibility of ciguatera poisoning.

== See also ==
- Mackerel as food
