= Scomberomorus avirostrus =

Scientific classification
- Domain: Eukaryota
- Kingdom: Animalia
- Phylum: Chordata
- Class: Actinopterygii
- Order: Scombriformes
- Family: Scombridae
- Genus: Scomberomorus
- Species: S. avirostrus

Binomial name
- Scomberomorus avirostrus Abdussamad, Toji, Margaret, Mini, Rajesh, Azeez, Vinothkumar, Retheesh, Abbas, Shihab, Sneha, Prathibha & Gopalakrishnan, 2023

Species of fish

Scomberomorus avirostrus, also known as Arabian sparrow seer, is a species of mackerel found on the coast of India and pelagic waters of the Indian Ocean, formerly confused with the Indo-Pacific king mackerel, due to the painted pattern on its body and shape. It was described based on specimens fished in Indian Ocean waters previously cataloged as Scomberomorus guttatus (Indo-Pacific king mackerel), but a phylogenetic analysis was carried out that showed mitochondrial divergence with the other species.

== See also ==
- Mackerel as food
