= Spotty =

Spotty may refer to:

- Sharptooth houndshark, Triakis megalopterus
- Australian spotted mackerel, Scomberomorus munroi
- Spotty (fish), Notolabrus celidotus
- Superted's sidekick
- Spotty (Pillow Pal), a Pillow Pal Dalmatian made by Ty, Inc.
- A schoolboy from the comic strip "Bash Street Kids"
- Algernon "Spotty" Perkins, a character in the comic strip "Dennis the Menace (UK)"
