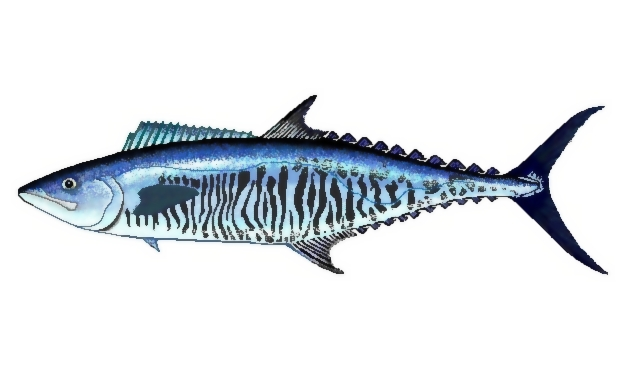
- Scomberomorus commerson

Conservation status
- Vulnerable (IUCN 3.1)

Scientific classification
- Kingdom: Animalia
- Phylum: Chordata
- Class: Actinopterygii
- Order: Scombriformes
- Family: Scombridae
- Genus: Scomberomorus
- Species: S. concolor

Binomial name
- Scomberomorus concolor (Lockington, 1879)

Synonyms
- Chriomitra concolor Lockington, 1879

= Monterrey Spanish mackerel =

Species of fish

The Monterrey Spanish mackerel (Scomberomorus concolor) is a species of fish in the family Scombridae. It is endemic to Mexico where it is found in the northern part of the Gulf of California. It is the subject of a fishery, its population is declining and the IUCN has rated it as being a "vulnerable species"

== Description ==
The Monterrey Spanish mackerel is a less deep-bodied fish than the bonito with which it is sometimes confused. The back is steely blue and the flanks silver. The pectoral fins are small and are located close to the gill covers. The dorsal fin has 15 to 18 spines and 16 to 20 soft rays while the anal fin has 19 to 23 soft rays. The lateral line curves downwards towards to the tail. Males are unspotted but females have two series of brown spots. Its standard length is 77 cm (30 in) and its maximum weight is 3.6 kg (8 lb).

== Distribution ==
Historically the Monterrey Spanish mackerel was probably present in the eastern Pacific and Gulf of California as one continuous population. More recently there have been two widely separated populations, one in the Gulf of California and the other in the East Pacific, along the coasts of California as far south as the Mexican border. The open sea population migrated northwards to Monterey Bay in September and then moved southwards in November to spend the winter around Catalina Island and in the Santa Barbara Channel. However, the range of this fish has contracted, the open sea population has vanished, and the fish is now restricted to a single population in the northern part of the Gulf of California.

== Status ==
The Monterrey Spanish mackerel is caught alongside the Pacific sierra (Scomberomorus sierra) by the use of gillnets, and the two fish are jointly marketed as "sierra". This makes it difficult to establish the conservation status of the Monterrey Spanish mackerel, however it is estimated that the total population has been declining markedly because of over-exploitation, with a further 40% reduction expected in the next ten years. With no sign in a reduction in fishery activity, the International Union for Conservation of Nature has rated this fish as being a "vulnerable species".

== See also ==
- Mackerel as food
