= Streptomyces bohaiensis =

Scientific classification
- Domain: Bacteria
- Kingdom: Bacillati
- Phylum: Actinomycetota
- Class: Actinomycetia
- Order: Streptomycetales
- Family: Streptomycetaceae
- Genus: Streptomyces
- Species: S. bohaiensis

Binomial name
- Streptomyces bohaiensis Pan et al. 2015

Type strain
- CCTCC AA 2013020, JCM 19630, KCTC 29263, 11A07

Species of bacterium

Streptomyces bohaiensis is a bacterium species from the genus of Streptomyces which has been isolated from the fish Scomberomorus niphonius from the Bohai Sea in China.

== See also ==
- List of Streptomyces species
