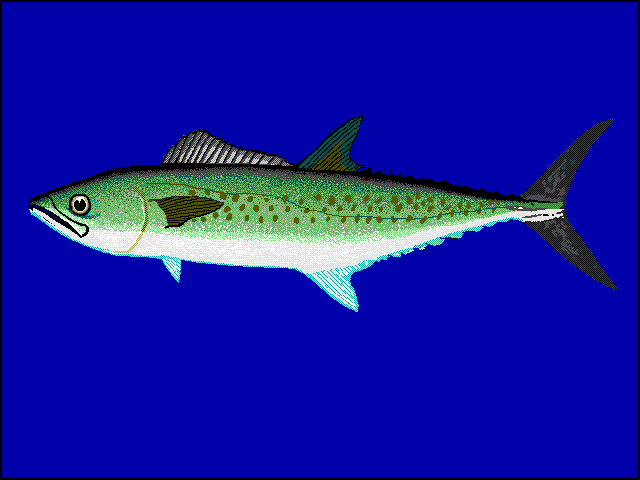

Conservation status
- Least Concern (IUCN 3.1)

Scientific classification
- Kingdom: Animalia
- Phylum: Chordata
- Class: Actinopterygii
- Order: Scombriformes
- Family: Scombridae
- Genus: Scomberomorus
- Species: S. tritor

Binomial name
- Scomberomorus tritor (Cuvier, 1832)

Synonyms
- Cybium tritor Cuvier, 1832; Apolectus immunis Bennett, 1831; Scomberomorus argyreus Fowler, 1905

= West African Spanish mackerel =

Species of fish

The West African Spanish mackerel (Scomberomorus tritor) is a species of fish in the family Scombridae.

Specimens have been recorded at up to 100 cm in length, and weighing up to 6 kg. Coloration is bluish-green on the back fading to silvery on the sides marked with about three rows of vertically elongated, orange spots.

It is found in the eastern Atlantic, along the Atlantic coasts of Africa from the Canary Islands and Senegal to the Gulf of Guinea and Baía dos Tigres, Angola. It is rarely found in the northern Mediterranean Sea, along the coasts of France and Italy.

It forms school close to the shore. It feeds on small fishes, especially clupeoides like sardines and anchovies. S. tritor has been erroneously been considered as a synonym of S. maculatus by many authors.

== See also ==
- Mackerel as food
