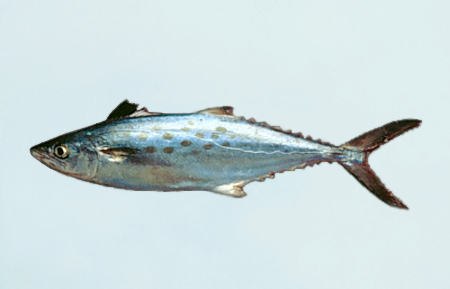

Conservation status
- Least Concern (IUCN 3.1)

Scientific classification
- Kingdom: Animalia
- Phylum: Chordata
- Class: Actinopterygii
- Division: Teleostei
- Order: Scombriformes
- Family: Scombridae
- Tribe: Scomberomorini
- Genus: Scomberomorus
- Species: S. maculatus

Binomial name
- Scomberomorus maculatus (Mitchill, 1815)

Synonyms
- Scomber maculatus Mitchill, 1815; Cybium maculatum (Mitchill, 1815)

= Atlantic Spanish mackerel =

Species of fish

The Atlantic Spanish mackerel (Scomberomorus maculatus) is a migratory species of mackerel that swims to the northern Gulf of Mexico in spring, and returns to southern Florida in the eastern Gulf, and to Mexico in the western Gulf in the fall.

== Description ==
The fish exhibits a green back; its sides are silvery marked with about three rows of round to elliptical yellow spots. The lateral line gradually curves down from the upper end of the gill cover toward caudal peduncle. The first (spiny) dorsal fin is black at the front. Posterior membranes are white with a black edge. Its single row of cutting-edged teeth in each jaw (around 64 teeth in all) are large, uniform, closely spaced, and flattened from side to side. As with the king mackerel and the cero mackerel, these teeth look very similar to those of the bluefish, Pomatomus saltatrix. Spanish mackerel can grow (rarely) to 37 in (940 mm) and weigh up to 14 lb (6.4 kg).

== Distribution/habitat ==
Spanish mackerel occur seasonally from the Yucatán Peninsula, Mexico, as far north as Cape Cod, Massachusetts. They are a shallow-water species, preferring sand bottom at depths of 10 to 40 ft (3 to 12 m), occasionally found as deep as 80 ft (24 m).

== Migration patterns ==
One Atlantic and one or more Gulf groups of Spanish mackerel apparently occur in Florida waters. With rising water temperatures, the Atlantic group migrates along the Atlantic Coast of the United States from Miami, Florida, beginning in late February through July, reaching as far as southern Cape Cod, Massachusetts, then returning in the fall. An eastern Gulf group moves northward from the Florida Keys during late winter and spring, appearing off the central West Coast of Florida about April 1. Movement continues westward and terminates along the northern Texas Gulf Coast. During fall, this group migrates back to its wintering grounds in the Florida Keys.

== Life history ==
The Gulf group of Spanish mackerel spawn in batches from May to September from off the shore of Texas to off the shore of Florida as early as April in some years. The Atlantic group spawns starting in April off the Carolinas and from late August to late September in the northernmost part of its range. Spanish mackerel mature by 1 year at a fork length of 14 in (36 cm). Females live longer and grow to larger sizes than males. Females may live as long as 11 years, growing to 11 lb (5.0 kg) and 33 in (84 cm) fork length. Males reach about 6 years old and 19 in (48 cm) in fork length.

== Feeding habits ==
Spanish mackerel are carnivores. As with other members of the genus, food consists mainly of small fishes with lesser quantities of shrimp and squid. Striped anchovies (Engraulidae) and clupeoids such as menhaden, alewives and thread herring (Opisthonema), are particularly important forage in North Carolina, Florida, Texas, and Veracruz. The percentage of anchovies consumed is higher for juveniles than for adults.

== Fisheries ==
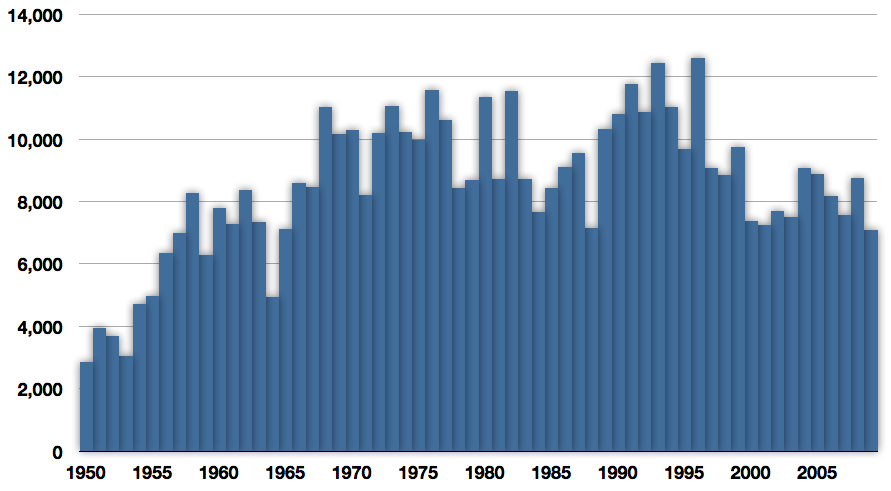
Commercial capture of Atlantic mackerel in tonnes from 1950 to 2009

=== Fishing gear and methods ===
Spanish mackerel are a highly valued fish throughout their range from North Carolina to Texas. Recreational anglers catch Spanish mackerel from boats while trolling or drifting and from boats, piers, jetties, and beaches by casting spoons and jigs and live-bait fishing. Fast lure retrieves are key to catching these quick fish. Commercial methods are primarily run-around gill netting, and rarely, by trolling lures similar to those used by recreational anglers.

On November 4, 1987, Woody Outlaw caught a world-record 13 lb Spanish mackerel on a blue and white Sea Witch with a strip of fastback menhaden on a 7/0 hook, held by a Shimano bait-casting reel on a Kuna rod with 30-pound-test line.

=== Management ===
Spanish mackerel are managed in commercial and recreation fisheries with bag limits, size limits, commercial trip limits, and with only seasonal fishing allowed. The management of mackerel has been considered a success because the population used to be in decline, but is now on the rise without overfishing occurring.

== As food ==
Spanish mackerel are primarily marketed fresh or frozen as fillets, as commercially caught fish are too small to sell in the form of steaks. Their raw flesh is white. They may be prepared by broiling, frying, baking, or rarely by smoking.

The Spanish mackerel is also a popular sushi fish. By analogy with the Japanese Spanish mackerel, which is a member of the same genus, it is often called sawara on sushi menus.

== Similar species ==
Spanish mackerel are similar in appearance to small king mackerel (Scomberomorus cavalla) and cero mackerel (S. regalis). All three are very similar in shape and coloration. They may be distinguished as follows:

The lateral lines on Spanish and cero mackerel slope gradually from the top edge of the gill to the tail. In contrast, that of the king mackerel takes an abrupt drop at midbody.

The first (spiny) dorsal on Spanish and cero mackerel has a prominent black patch. The king mackerel has none. As all three species normally keep the first dorsal folded back in a body groove, this difference is not immediately evident.

Spanish mackerel have prominent yellow spots on the flanks at all sizes. In addition to such spots, cero mackerel have one or more yellow stripes along the centerline. Young king mackerel have similar, but slightly smaller spots; these fade away on individuals weighing over 10 lb (4.5 kg), but they may still be seen as spots of slightly darker green on the upper back from some angles of view.

Worldwide, many members of this genus ae quite similar to one or another of these three species. In particular, off Mexico, Atlantic Spanish mackerel may be confused with Sierra Spanish mackerel (S. brasiliensis), which may appear in the same area.

== See also ==
- Atlantic mackerel (Scomber scombrus)
- Mackerel as food
