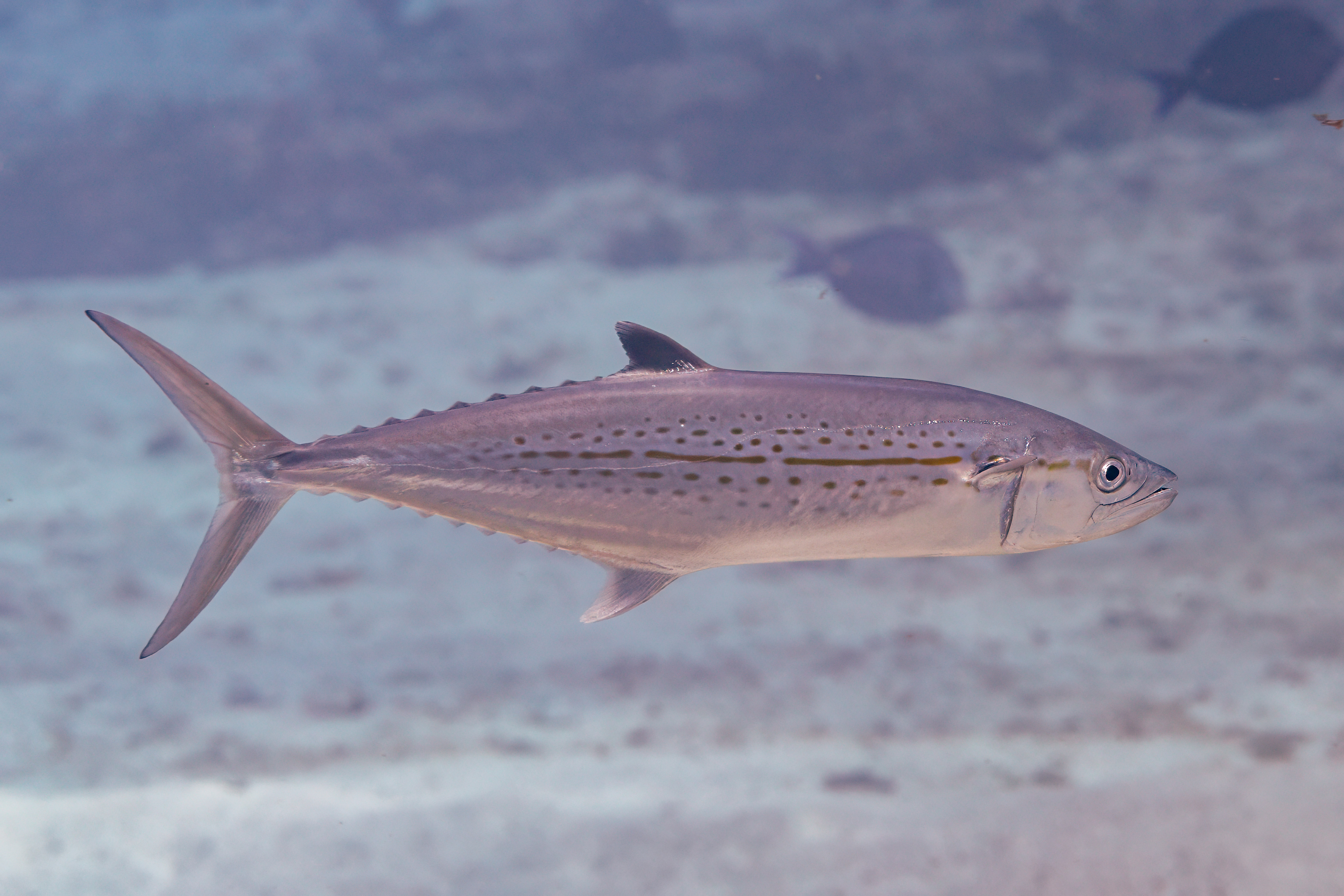

Conservation status
- Least Concern (IUCN 3.1)

Scientific classification
- Kingdom: Animalia
- Phylum: Chordata
- Class: Actinopterygii
- Division: Teleostei
- Order: Scombriformes
- Family: Scombridae
- Tribe: Scomberomorini
- Genus: Scomberomorus
- Species: S. regalis

Binomial name
- Scomberomorus regalis (Bloch, 1793)
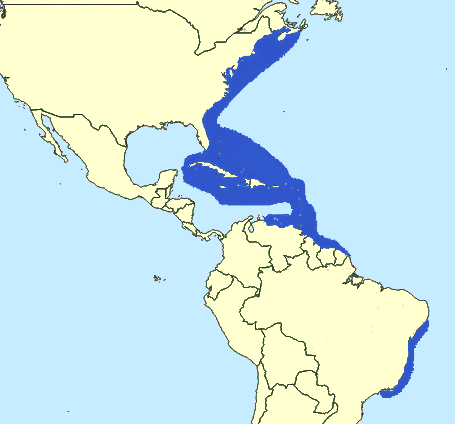

Synonyms
- Scomberomorus plumierii Lacépède, 1801; Scomber regalis Bloch, 1793; Cybium regale (Bloch, 1793)

= Cero (fish) =

Species of fish

The cero (Scomberomorus regalis), also known as the pintado, kingfish, cero mackerel, cerite or painted mackerel, is a ray-finned bony fish in the family Scombridae, better known as the mackerel family. More specifically, this fish is a member of the tribe Scomberomorini, the Spanish mackerels, and is the type species of the genus Scomberomorus.

== Description ==
In the Cayman Islands

It is similar in appearance and coloration to the Atlantic Spanish mackerel, Scomberomorus maculatus, except the cero has a longitudinal stripe in addition to the spots of the Atlantic Spanish mackerel. Additionally, the cero reaches larger sizes than the Atlantic Spanish mackerel, often 10 lb (4.5 kg) or more, but those over 30 lb (14 kg) are extremely rare. The first dorsal fin is black anteriorly, the lateral line descends slowly from the shoulder without the sharp break seen on the king mackerel, Scomberomorus cavalla.

== Distribution ==
It is found in the western Atlantic from Cape Cod through the Caribbean Sea and the Gulf of Mexico to Rio de Janeiro in Brazil.

== See also ==
- Mackerel as food
