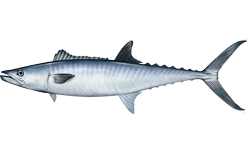

Conservation status
- Least Concern (IUCN 3.1)

Scientific classification
- Kingdom: Animalia
- Phylum: Chordata
- Class: Actinopterygii
- Division: Teleostei
- Order: Scombriformes
- Family: Scombridae
- Genus: Scomberomorus
- Species: S. cavalla

Binomial name
- Scomberomorus cavalla (Cuvier, 1829)

Synonyms
- Cybium cavalla Cuvier, 1829; Cybium caballa Cuvier, 1832; Scomberomorus caballa (Cuvier, 1832); Cybium acervum Cuvier, 1832; Cybium clupeoideum Cuvier, 1832; Cybium immaculatum Cuvier, 1832

= King mackerel =

Species of fish

The king mackerel (Scomberomorus cavalla), kingfish or carite lucio is a migratory species of mackerel of the western Atlantic Ocean and Gulf of Mexico. It is an important species to both the commercial and recreational fishing industries.

== Description ==
The king mackerel is a medium-sized fish, typically encountered from 5 kg (11 lb) to 14 kg (30 lb), but is known to exceed 40 kg (90 lb). The entire body is covered with very small, hardly visible, loosely attached scales. The first (spiny) dorsal fin is entirely colorless and is normally folded back into a body groove, as are the pelvic fins. The lateral line starts high on the shoulder, dips abruptly at mid-body and then continues as a wavy horizontal line to the tail. Coloration is olive on the back, fading to silver with a rosy iridescence on the sides, fading to white on the belly. Fish under 5 kg (11 lb) show yellowish-brown spots on the flanks, somewhat smaller than the spots of the Atlantic Spanish mackerel, Scomberomorus maculatus. Its cutting-edged teeth are large, uniform, closely spaced and flattened from side to side. These teeth look very similar to those of the bluefish, Pomatomus saltatrix.

=== Similar species ===
Small king mackerel are similar in appearance to Atlantic Spanish mackerel, Scomberomorus maculatus, and cero mackerel, Scomberomorus regalis, all three species being similar in shape and coloration. They may be distinguished as follows:

The lateral line on Atlantic Spanish mackerel and cero slopes gradually from the top edge of the gill to the tail. In contrast, that of the king mackerel takes an abrupt drop at mid-body (see illustration).

The first (spiny) dorsal fin on Atlantic Spanish mackerel and cero has a prominent black patch. The king mackerel does not. As all three species normally keep the first dorsal folded back in a body groove, this difference is not immediately evident.

Atlantic Spanish mackerel have prominent yellow spots on the flanks at all sizes. In addition to such spots, cero have one or more yellow stripes along the centerline. Young king mackerel have similar, but slightly smaller spots; these fade away on individuals weighing over 5 kg (10 lb), but may still be seen as slightly darker green spots toward the back from some angles of view.

Worldwide, many fish of these three species are quite similar to one or another. Off Mexico, Atlantic Spanish mackerel may be confused with Serra Spanish mackerel, Scomberomorus brasiliensis.

== Distribution and habitat ==
The king mackerel is a subtropical species of the Atlantic Coast of the Americas. Common in the coastal zone from North Carolina to Brazil, it occurs as far south as Rio de Janeiro, and occasionally as far north as the Gulf of Maine. Records from the Mediterranean Sea are questionable, so it remains a possible vagrant there. Nonetheless, a preference for water temperatures in the range of 20 to 29 °C (68 to 84 °F) may limit distribution.

King mackerel commonly occur in depths of 12–45 m (40–150 ft), where the principal fisheries occur. Larger kings (heavier than 9 kg or 20 lb) often occur inshore, in the mouths of inlets and harbors, and occasionally even at the 180 m (590 ft) depths at the edge of the Gulf Stream.

== Migration patterns ==
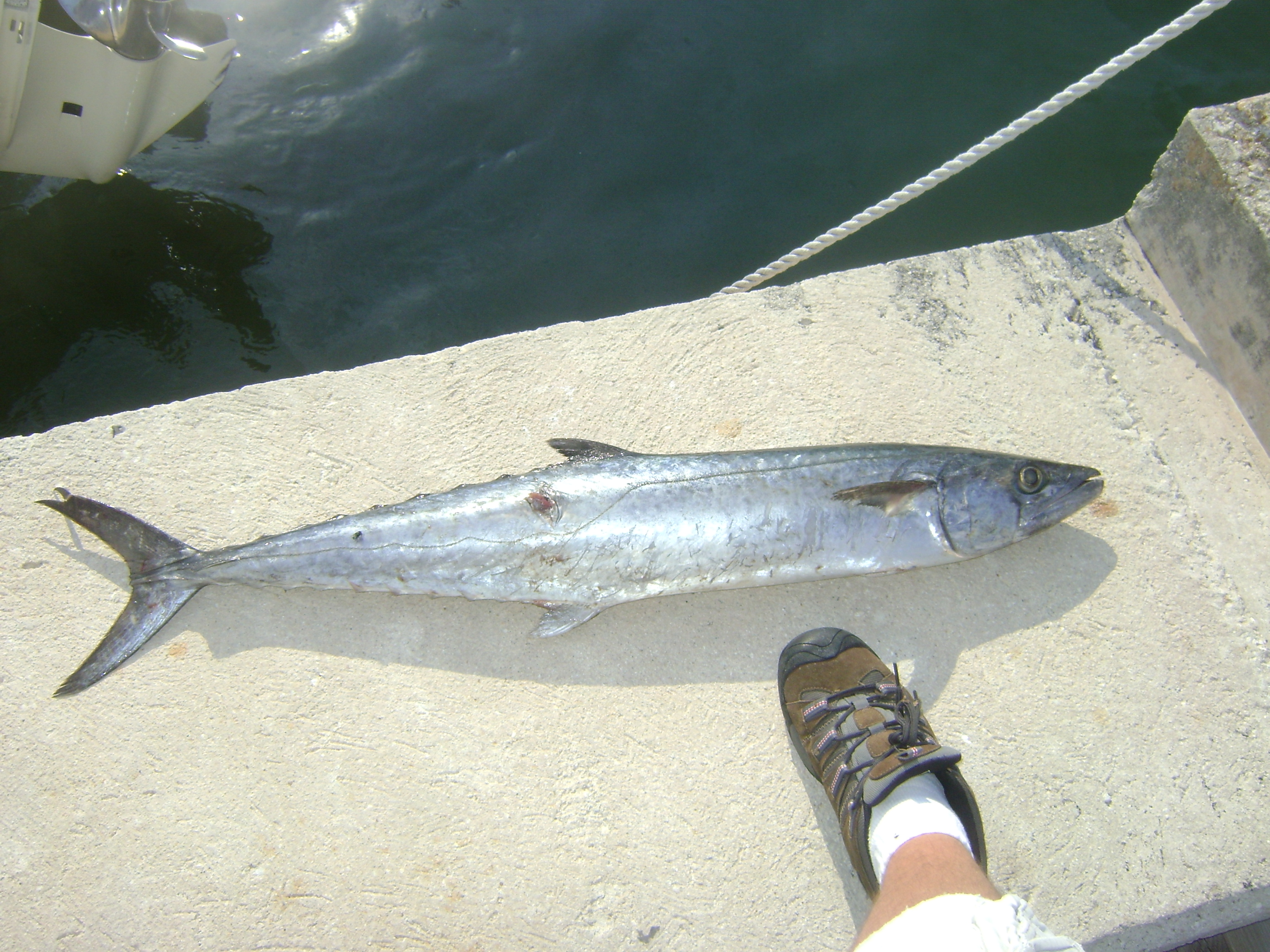
A male king mackerel, about 6 kg (13 lb).

King mackerel migrate with seasonal changes in water temperature and with changes in food availability. They migrate to the northern part of their range in the summer and to the southern part in the winter, swimming in large schools. Both the South Atlantic and Gulf of Mexico stocks congregate in a winter mixing zone in an area of Monroe County, Florida, south of the Florida Keys, between November and March.

== Life history ==
Eggs and sperm are shed into the sea and their union is by chance. Depending on size, a female may shed from 50,000 to several million eggs over the spawning season. Fertilized eggs hatch in about 24 hours. The newly hatched larva is about 2.5 mm (0.098 in) long with a large yolk sack. Little is known about king mackerel in their first year of life. Yearling fish typically attain an average weight of 1.4–1.8 kg (3.1–4.0 lb) and a fork length of 60 cm (24 in). At age seven, females average 10 kg (22 lb), males 5 kg (11 lb). King mackerel may attain 40 kg (88 lb), but any over 7 kg (15 lb) is almost certainly a female.

== Feeding habits ==
King mackerel are voracious, opportunistic carnivores. Their prey depends on their size. Depending on area and season, they favor squid, menhaden and other sardine-like fish (Clupeidae), jacks (Carangidae), cutlassfish (Trichiuridae), weakfish (Sciaenidae), grunts (Haemulidae), striped anchovies (Engraulidae), cigar minnows, threadfin, northern mackerel, and blue runners. They do not attack humans but will defend themselves against perceived threats, including humans flailing or thrashing in man-overboard and similar situations, by biting.

== Fisheries ==
Global capture production of King mackerel (Scomberomorus cavalla) in thousands tonnes from 1950 to 2022, as reported by the FAO

=== Fishing gear and methods ===
King mackerel are among the most sought-after gamefish throughout their range from North Carolina to Texas. Known throughout the sportfishing world for their blistering runs, the king mackerel matches its distant relative, the wahoo, in speed. They are taken mostly by trolling, using various live and dead baitfish, spoons, jigs and other artificial lures. Commercial gear consists of run-around gill nets. They are also taken commercially by trolling with large planers, heavy tackle and lures similar to those used by sport fishers. Typically when using live bait, two hooks are tied to a strong metal leader. The first may be a treble or single and is hooked through the live bait's nose and/or mouth. The second hook (treble hook) is placed through the top of the fish's back or allowed to swing free. This must be done because king mackerel commonly bite the tail section of a bait fish. When trolling for kings using this method, it is important to make sure the baitfish are swimming properly. Typical tackle includes a conventional or spinning reel capable of holding 340 m (370 yd) of 13 kg (29 lb) test monofilament and a 2 m (6 ft 7 in), 13 kg (29 lb) class rod.

Several organizations have found success in promoting tournament events for this species because of their popularity as a sport fish. The most notable are the Southern Kingfish Association (SKA) and the FLW Outdoors tour. These events are covered in several outdoors publications, both in print and online.

== As food ==
=== Processing ===
As of 2005, king mackerel are primarily marketed fresh. They may be sold as fillets, steaks, or in the round (whole). Their raw flesh is grayish, due to its high fat content. They are best prepared by grilling, frying, baking or, especially for large "smoker" king, by smoking.

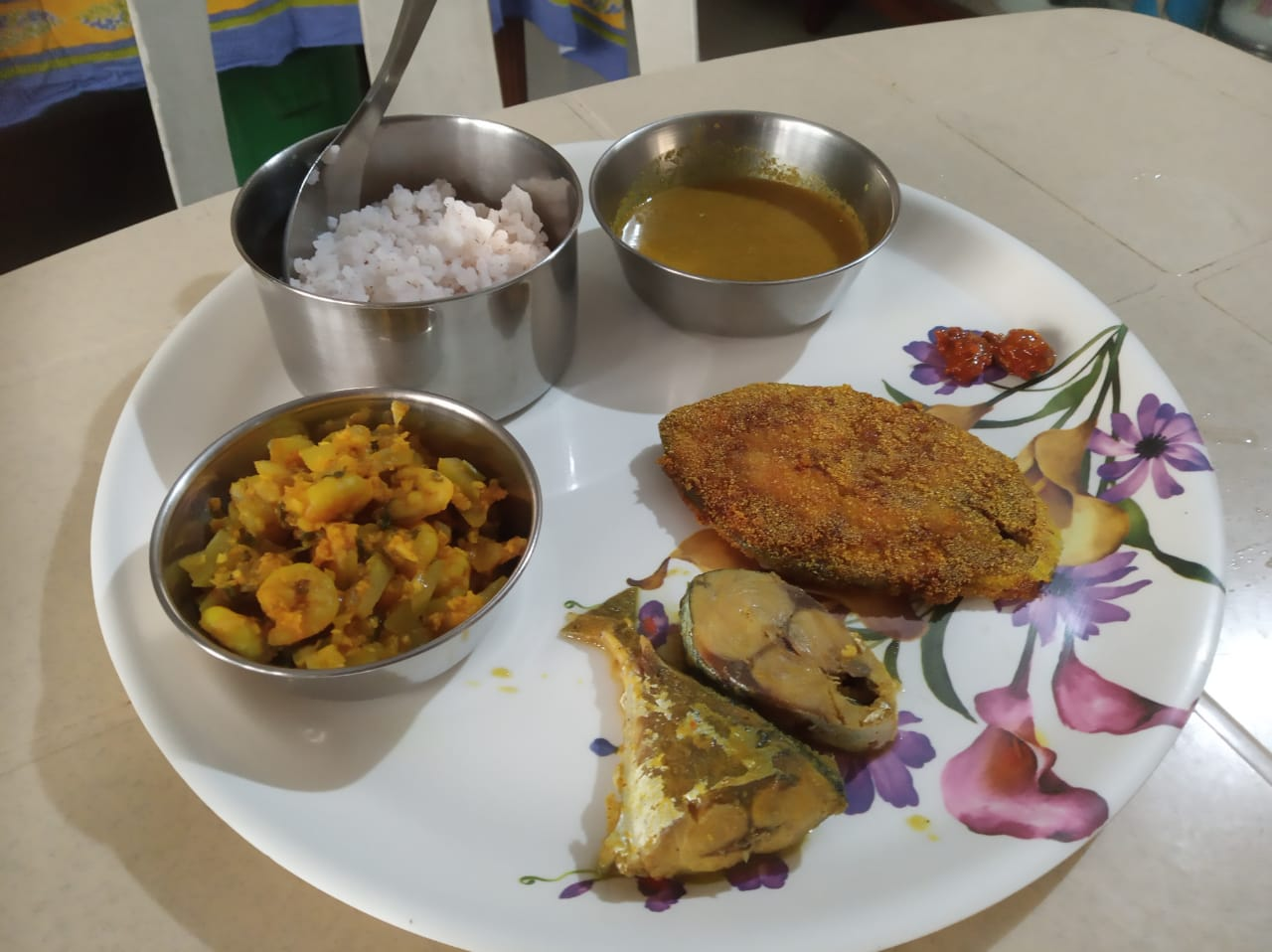
Typical Goan meal with fried king mackerel, mackerel curry, parboiled rice and shrimp veg preparation.

=== Nutrition ===
According to the United States Food and Drug Administration, king mackerel is one of four fishes, along with swordfish, shark, and tilefish, that children and pregnant women should avoid due to high levels of methylmercury found in these fish and the consequent risk of mercury poisoning.

== See also ==
- Mackerel as food
