= Papuan seerfish =

Conservation status
- Least Concern (IUCN 3.1)

Scientific classification
- Kingdom: Animalia
- Phylum: Chordata
- Class: Actinopterygii
- Order: Scombriformes
- Family: Scombridae
- Genus: Scomberomorus
- Species: S. multiradiatus

Binomial name
- Scomberomorus multiradiatus Munro, 1964

Species of fish

The Papuan seerfish (Scomberomorus multiradiatus) also called the Papuan Spanish mackerel, is a species of fish in the family Scombridae. It is endemic to the Gulf of Papua off the mouth of the Fly River. It is the smallest species in the genus Scomberomorus. Sexual maturity is attained at much less than 30 cm fork length.

== See also ==
- Mackerel as food
