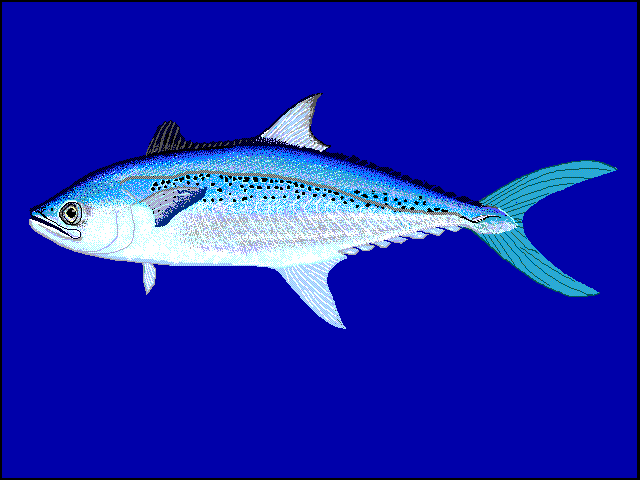

Conservation status
- Least Concern (IUCN 3.1)

Scientific classification
- Kingdom: Animalia
- Phylum: Chordata
- Class: Actinopterygii
- Order: Scombriformes
- Family: Scombridae
- Tribe: Scomberomorini
- Genus: Scomberomorus
- Species: S. koreanus

Binomial name
- Scomberomorus koreanus (Kishinouye, 1915)

Synonyms
- Cybium koreanum, Kishinouye, 1915

= Korean mackerel =

Species of fish

The Korean mackerel (Scomberomorus koreanus) also known as the Korean seerfish, is a ray-finned bony fish in the family Scombridae, better known as the mackerel family. Within that family, this fish is a member of the tribe Scomberomorini, the Spanish mackerels. It has an Indo-Pacific distribution which extends from the east coast of India and Sri Lanka along the Asian continental shelf to Sumatra, then north to Korea and Wakasa Bay in the Sea of Japan. This species is of minor commercial importance in some parts of its range, where it is caught using gill nets and is marketed either fresh or dried-salted. The Korean mackerel is an important quarry species for the drift net fishery in Palk Bay and the Gulf of Mannar in India.

== See also ==
- Chinese mackerel
- Mackerel as food
