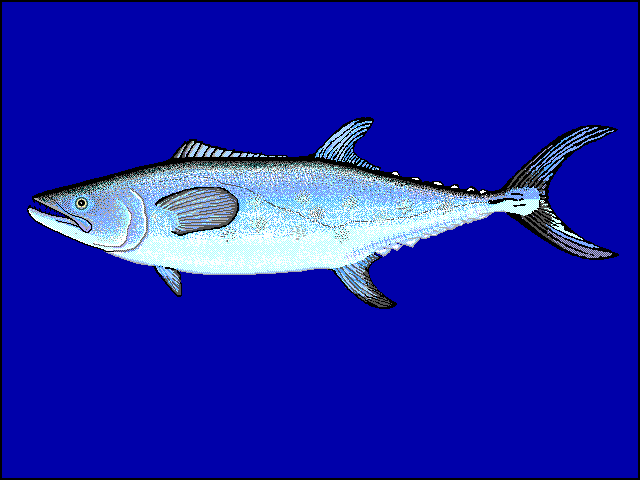

Conservation status
- Near Threatened (IUCN 3.1)

Scientific classification
- Kingdom: Animalia
- Phylum: Chordata
- Class: Actinopterygii
- Division: Teleostei
- Order: Scombriformes
- Family: Scombridae
- Tribe: Scomberomorini
- Genus: Scomberomorus
- Species: S. sinensis

Binomial name
- Scomberomorus sinensis (Lacépède, 1800)

Synonyms
- Scomber sinensis Lacepède, 1800; Cybium sinensis (Lacepède, 1800); Cybium chinense Cuvier, 1832; Scomberomorus chinense (Cuvier, 1832); Scomberomorus chinensis (Cuvier, 1832); Cybium cambodgiense Durand, 1940; Scomberomorus cambodgiense (Durand, 1940)

= Chinese mackerel =

Species of fish

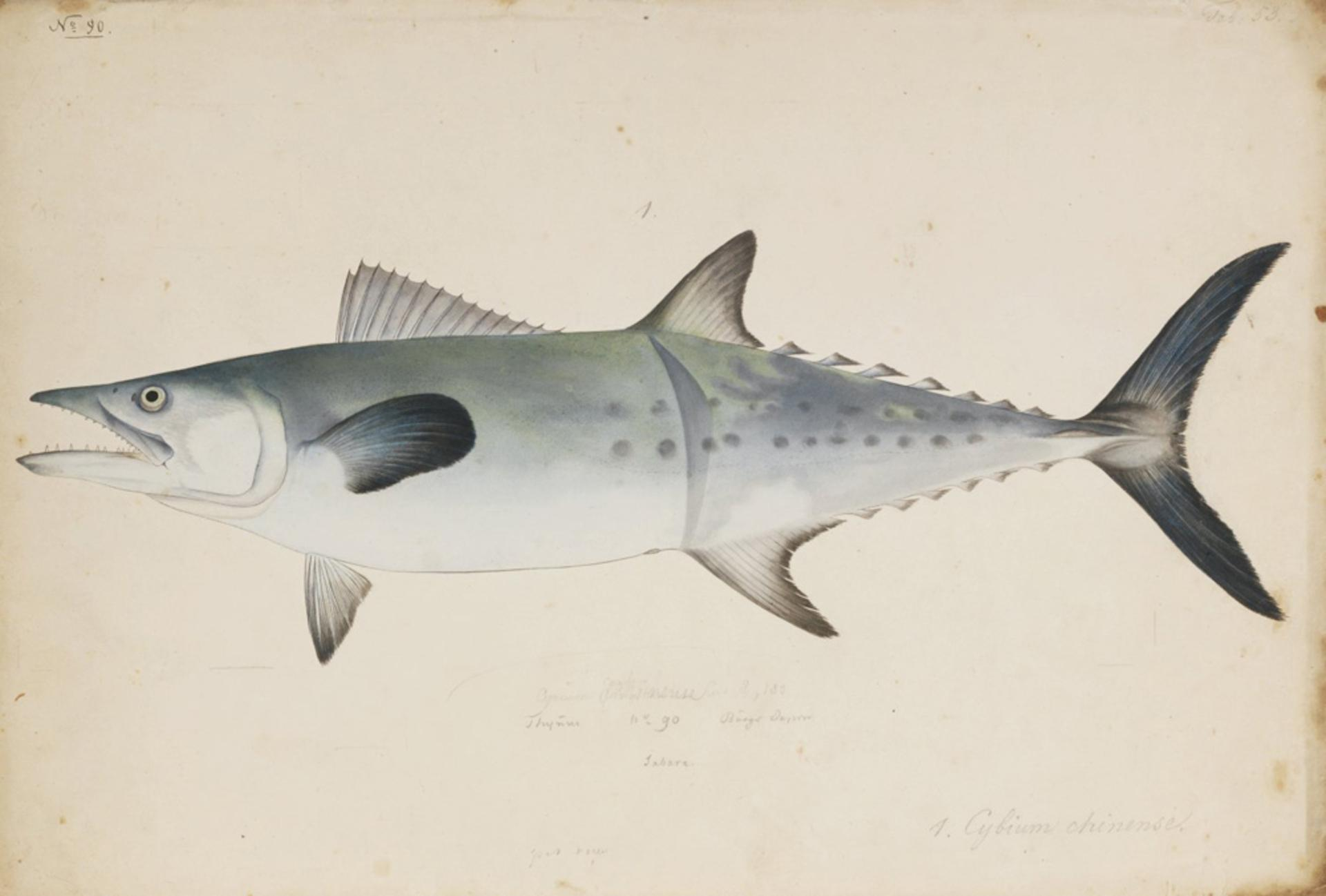
Drawing of Scomberomorus sinensis

The Chinese mackerel (Scomberomorus sinensis), also known as the Chinese seerfish, is a ray-finned bony fish in the family Scombridae, better known as the mackerel family. More specifically, this fish is a member of the tribe Scomberomorini, the Spanish mackerels. It is a marine species occurring in the Western Pacific Ocean, but it also enters the Mekong River.

The largest of the Spanish mackerels, the largest Chinese Seerfish was 131 kg (289 lb), which was caught off the coast of Korea in 1982.

The fish is often confused for the Dogtooth tuna, but can be differentiated by the more curved lateral line and silver spots.

== See also ==
- Korean mackerel
- Mackerel as food
