= Broadbarred king mackerel =

Conservation status
- Least Concern (IUCN 3.1)

Scientific classification
- Kingdom: Animalia
- Phylum: Chordata
- Class: Actinopterygii
- Order: Scombriformes
- Family: Scombridae
- Genus: Scomberomorus
- Species: S. semifasciatus

Binomial name
- Scomberomorus semifasciatus Macleay, 1883

Species of fish

The broadbarred king mackerel or grey mackerel (Scomberomorus semifasciatus) is a species of fish in the family Scombridae found in tropical waters of the western Pacific, along the northern coast of Australia and the southern coast of Papua New Guinea, from Shark Bay, Western Australia to northern New South Wales, in waters from the surface down to 100 m (330 ft). Specimens have been recorded at up to 120 cm (47 in) in length, and weighing up to 10 kg (22 lb). They are pelagic predators, feeding on small fishes such as sardines and herring.

== See also ==
- Mackerel as food
