= Sea Witch (lure) =

Artificial fishing lure

The Sea Witch is a record setting artificial fishing lure made by C&H Lures. It has been in production since 1925. It is recommended for trolling for billfish and dolphin.

== Records ==
- In 1987, it was used to catch the world-record Spanish mackerel.
- In 2014, it was used to catch the Maryland state record Wahoo.
