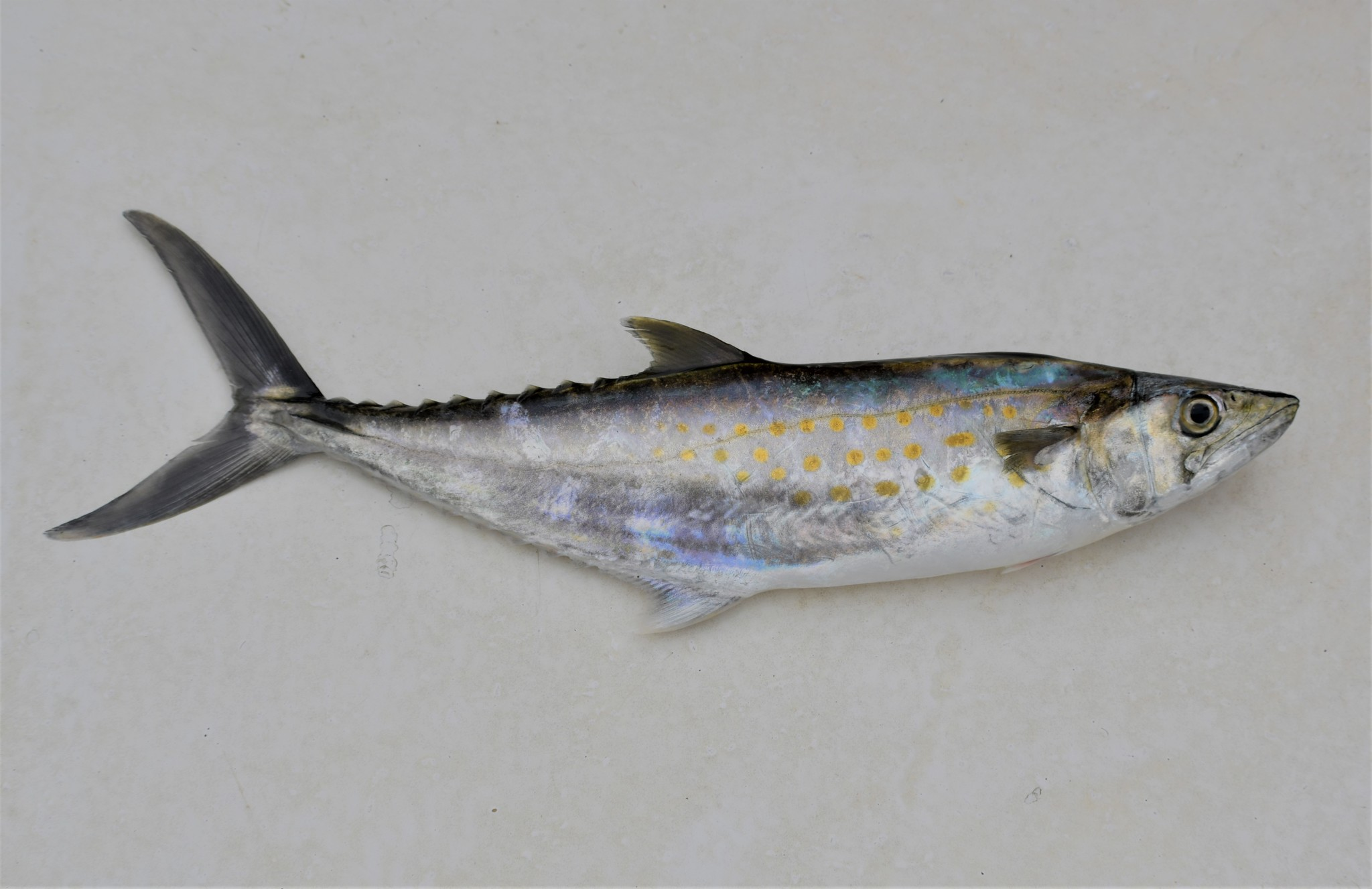

Conservation status
- Least Concern (IUCN 3.1)

Scientific classification
- Kingdom: Animalia
- Phylum: Chordata
- Class: Actinopterygii
- Division: Teleostei
- Order: Scombriformes
- Family: Scombridae
- Tribe: Scomberomorini
- Genus: Scomberomorus
- Species: S. sierra

Binomial name
- Scomberomorus sierra Jordan and Starks in Jordan, 1895

= Pacific sierra =

Species of fish

The Pacific sierra (Scomberomorus sierra) also known as the Mexican sierra, is a ray-finned bony fish in the family Scombridae, better known as the mackerel family. More specifically, this fish is a member of the tribe Scomberomorini, the Spanish mackerels. It occurs in the eastern Pacific Ocean from southern California to Antofagasta in Chile.

== See also ==
- Mackerel as food
