= Sea Witch (Delaware) =

American folk legend

The Sea Witch refers to the mascot of the annual Sea Witch Festival in Rehoboth Beach, Delaware.

She is most often represented by one of two parade balloons—Sally and later Hilda. Both were designed by Ken Moody for Kemps Balloons, a balloon manufacturing company based in Selbyville, Delaware.

Modern writers have tied her story to the concept of the “weather witch,” which was allegedly encountered by treasure hunters seeking the “treasure” of the HMS Braak a Royal Navy ship that sank on May 23, 1798, in the Delaware Bay off the coast of Cape Henlopen.

== Lost treasure ==
HMS Braak sank in May 1798. The ship capsized, drowning pilot Andrew Drew and 35 of his crew, as well as their 12 Spanish prisoners.

Rumor spread that the ship had been carrying a large treasure of gold and silver. Various expeditions were made trying to locate the missing treasure, including the "Colstadt expedition from New England." The Colstadt searched for over three years, and kept running into bad weather. One day the Colstadt group tried to change the weather by "raising a witch," as they burned a witch effigy.

In April 1937, copper coins began turning up on nearby Rehoboth beaches, a short distance from the wreck. This ignited new interest in the legend of the treasure.

It was not until 1980s when a number of artifacts were raised. Maritime archaeologists criticized these efforts for their disregard for proper archaeological methods, and for their discarding of anything not considered inherently valuable. In 1986, Braak's hull was raised, but in such a way that considerable damage was done to both it and the surrounding area of archaeological interest.

The hull was eventually placed in the county museum, as were many of the artifacts recovered, including items such as decanters, bottles, and glasses. Only a small amount of coin was recovered, worth considerably less than the cost of the large number of salvage attempts that had been undertaken over the years. The treatment of the wreck of Braak, and of many others like it, was a contributing factor to the passage of the Abandoned Shipwrecks Act of 1987.

== The Festival ==
The Rehoboth Sea Witch Festival, which draws its name not from the legend, but instead of the historic clipper ship of the same name, began in 1989. The idea was conceived by Carol Everhart at the Rehoboth-Dewey Chamber of Commerce, who was tasked with finding a means of attracting tourists during the fall season. The Sea Witch was given a permanent image in the form of a green-skinned, witch parade balloon in 1997.

== See also ==
- Witch trials in Maryland
