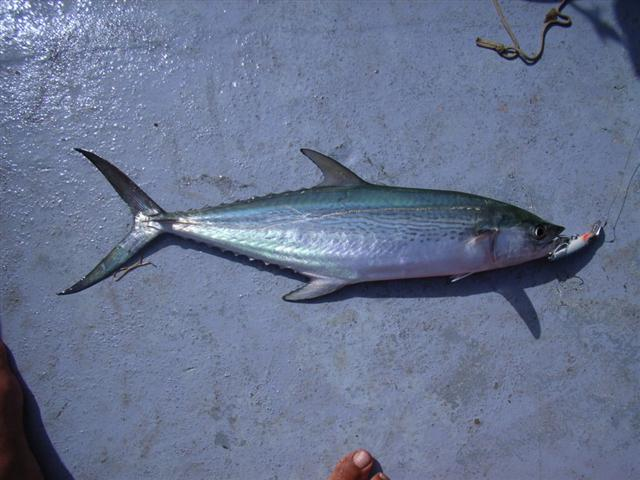

Conservation status
- Data Deficient (IUCN 3.1)

Scientific classification
- Kingdom: Animalia
- Phylum: Chordata
- Class: Actinopterygii
- Order: Scombriformes
- Family: Scombridae
- Genus: Scomberomorus
- Species: S. plurilineatus

Binomial name
- Scomberomorus plurilineatus Fourmanoir, 1966
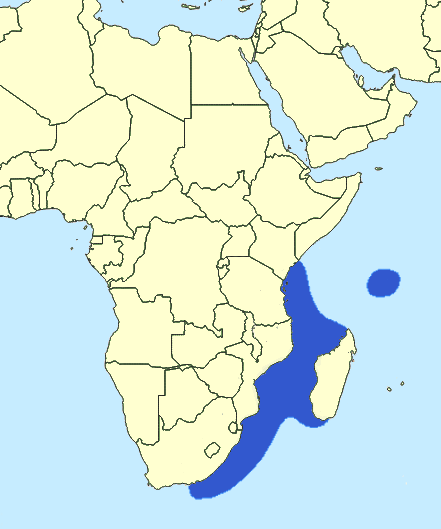
- distribution of Scomberomorus plurilineatus

= Kanadi kingfish =

Species of fish

The Kanadi kingfish (Scomberomorus plurilineatus) is a species of ray-finned bony fish in the family Scombridae, the mackerel family. Also known as the Kanadi seerfish, queen mackerel, or spotted mackerel, it is found in subtropical waters of the western Indian Ocean, Seychelles, Kenya and Zanzibar to South Africa and along the west coast of Madagascar. Kanadi kingfish commonly occur in depths of 50 to 200 m (164 to 656 ft). Specimens have been recorded at up to 120 cm (47 in) in length, and weighing up to 12.5 kg (28 lb). They feed mainly on small fishes such as anchovies and clupeids, squids, and mantis shrimps.

== See also ==
- Mackerel as food
