= Ian Stafford Ross Munro =

Australian ichthyologist and marine biologist

Ian Stafford Ross Munro (1919–1994) was an Australian ichthyologist and marine biologist.

== Early life ==
Munro grew up in Brisbane and received degrees from the University of Queensland in the early 1940s, studying marine biology, while also conducted service in the Australian Reserve Military Forces (as part of WW2).

== Career ==
In 1943 he started work as an assistant research officer with the CSIR Division of Fisheries at Cronulla, New South Wales, which became the CSIRO after 1956. Munro continued to work at CSIRO as a research scientist until his retirement in 1984, but continued to work as an Honorary Research Fellow at CSIRO until shortly before his death.

From 1963 Munro led the Gulf of Carpentaria Prawn Survey, which was essential for the establishment of the prawn fishery in the area. Earlier, Munro had worked to document the poorly known fish fauna off northern Australian and New Guinea, and from 1948-1950 he participated in fisheries surveys in the region to document the fish fauna. One of Munro's more important legacies was starting the Australian National Fish Collection (ANFC) at CSIRO, known as the "I. S. R. Munro Ichthyological Collection" in his honor until its recent name change to the ANFC. This collection comprised 2500 species and 60,000 specimens at Munro's retirement, and has since grown to contain 3,700 species and more than 160,000 specimens, the largest fish collection in Australia.

Munro published almost 100 papers related to ichthyology and fisheries research, including the significant monographic works "The Marine and Freshwater Fishes of Ceylon" (1955) and "The Fishes of New Guinea" (1967), the first thorough treatments of the fishes from these regions. Several fish species have been named in his honor (patronyms), including Strabozebrias munroi, Scomberomorus munroi, and Crapatalus munroi.

== See also ==
- Category:Taxa named by Ian Stafford Ross Munro
