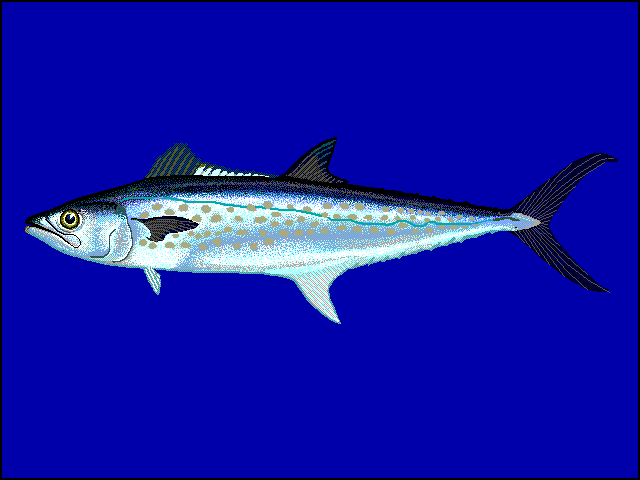

Conservation status
- Least Concern (IUCN 3.1)

Scientific classification
- Kingdom: Animalia
- Phylum: Chordata
- Class: Actinopterygii
- Order: Scombriformes
- Family: Scombridae
- Genus: Scomberomorus
- Species: S. brasiliensis

Binomial name
- Scomberomorus brasiliensis Collette, Russo & Zavala-Camin, 1978

= Serra Spanish mackerel =

Species of fish

The Sierra Spanish mackerel (Scomberomorus brasiliensis) is a species of fish in the family Scombridae. Specimens have been recorded at up to 125 cm in length, and weighing up to 6.71 kg. It is found in the western Atlantic, along the Caribbean and Atlantic coasts of Central and South America from Belize to Rio Grande do Sul, Brazil. Literature records for S. maculatus (Atlantic Spanish mackerel) from the area apply to S. brasiliensis, which has erroneously been considered a synonym of S. maculatus by many authors. It feeds on small fish, squid/cuttlefish, shrimp/prawn, and isopods.

== See also ==
- Mackerel as food
