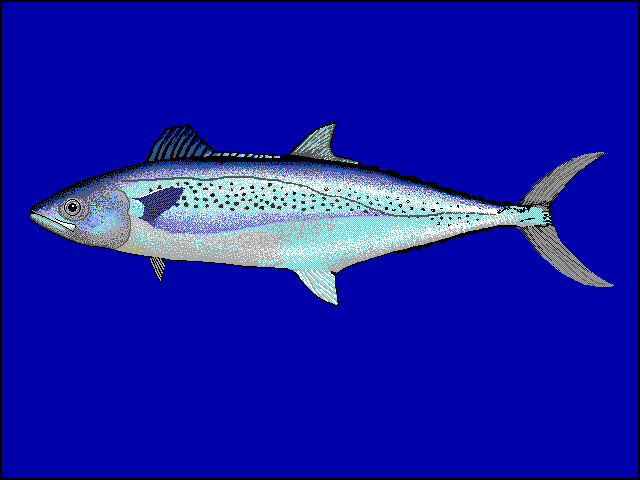

Conservation status
- Data Deficient (IUCN 3.1)

- Least Concern (IUCN 3.1)

Scientific classification
- Kingdom: Animalia
- Phylum: Chordata
- Class: Actinopterygii
- Order: Scombriformes
- Family: Scombridae
- Genus: Scomberomorus
- Species: S. guttatus

Binomial name
- Scomberomorus guttatus (Bloch & Schneider, 1801)

Synonyms
- Cybium crookewitii Bleeker, 1851; Cybium guttatum, (Bloch & Schneider 1801); Cybium interruptum Cuvier 1832; Cybium kuhlii, Cuvier 1832; Indocybium guttatum, (Bloch & Schneider 1801); Scomber guttatus, Bloch & Schneider 1801; Scomber leopardus, Shaw 1803; Scomberomorus crookewiti, (Bleeker 1851); Scomberomorus guttatum, (Bloch & Schneider 1801); Scomberomorus interruptus, (Cuvier 1832); Scomberomorus kuhlii, (Cuvier 1832); Scomberomous guttatum, (Bloch & Schneider 1801)

= Indo-Pacific king mackerel =

Species of fish

Indo-Pacific king mackerel (Scomberomorus guttatus), also known as the spotted seer fish or spotted Spanish mackerel, is a sea fish among the mackerel variety of fishes. It is found in the Indian Ocean and adjoining seas. It can grow up to 4.5 kg (9.9 lb), but possibly up to 6 kg (13 lb) with a length of 81.5 cm (32.1 in). It is a popular game fish and a strong fighter that has on occasion been seen to leap out of the water when hooked.

== As food ==
It is popular among the countries of the Indian subcontinent including peninsular India, Sri Lanka, Bangladesh, Iran and Pakistan. Seer fish is a delicacy in several regions of India. In Tamil Nadu and Andhra Pradesh, this fish is called Vanjaram in Tamil and Telugu as well as Shermai among the Deccanis of Telangana and is usually the costliest variety available. In the Konkan Division of coastal Maharashtra, the Marathi word for the fish is Surmāi, while in Goan Konkani it is called Visvonn or Isvonn. In coastal Karnataka, especially in the erstwhile South Canara district, they are called Anjal. In Kerala, in the region of North Malabar it is called Ayakoora whereas in southern districts of the state, it is called Ney-meen. They can be broiled, fried, and also made as curry. In addition to being cooked and eaten when fresh, it is also used to make fish pickle, usually eaten as a condiment with rice.

== Fisheries ==
Global capture production of Indo-Pacific king mackerel (Scomberomorus guttatus) in thousand tonnes from 1950 to 2022, as reported by the FAO

== See also ==
- Mackerel as food
