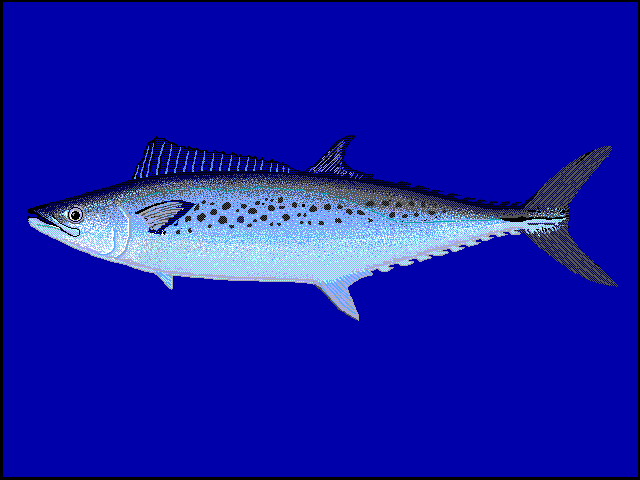

Conservation status
- Near Threatened (IUCN 3.1)

Scientific classification
- Kingdom: Animalia
- Phylum: Chordata
- Class: Actinopterygii
- Order: Scombriformes
- Family: Scombridae
- Genus: Scomberomorus
- Species: S. munroi

Binomial name
- Scomberomorus munroi Collette & Russo, 1980

= Australian spotted mackerel =

Species of fish

The Australian spotted mackerel (Scomberomorus munroi) is a species of fish in the family Scombridae. Common fork length ranges between 50 and 80 cm. Specimens have been recorded at up to 104 cm in length, and weighing up to 10.2 kg. It is found in the western Pacific, along the northern coast of Australia, from the Abrolhos Islands region of Western Australia to Coffs Harbour and Kempsey in central New South Wales. It is also found in southern Papua New Guinea from Kerema to Port Moresby. It feeds largely on fishes, particularly anchovies and sardines, with smaller quantities of shrimps and squids. It is sometimes confused with Japanese Spanish mackerel, S. niphonius. Conservation status of the species has been evaluated as Near Threatened by the IUCN. This species was described in 1980 and was previously confused with the Japanese Spanish mackerel of the north western Pacific but S. munroi has a different visceral structure, more vertebrae and fewer gill rakers.

== See also ==
- Mackerel as food
