= William Neale Lockington =

William Neale Lockington (1840 in Rugby, Warwickshire, England – 1902 in Worthing, Sussex) was an English zoologist.

== California ==
Lockington was the curator of the California Academy of Sciences museum in San Francisco, California from 1875 to 1881.

== See also ==
- People associated with the California Academy of Sciences
- Category:Taxa named by William Neale Lockington
