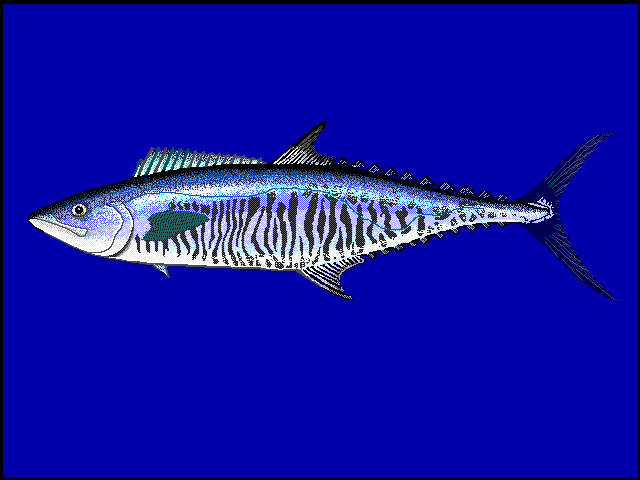

Conservation status
- Near Threatened (IUCN 3.1)(Global)

- Vulnerable (IUCN 3.1)(Persian Gulf)

Scientific classification
- Kingdom: Animalia
- Phylum: Chordata
- Class: Actinopterygii
- Division: Teleostei
- Order: Scombriformes
- Family: Scombridae
- Genus: Scomberomorus
- Species: S. commerson

Binomial name
- Scomberomorus commerson (Lacépède, 1800)
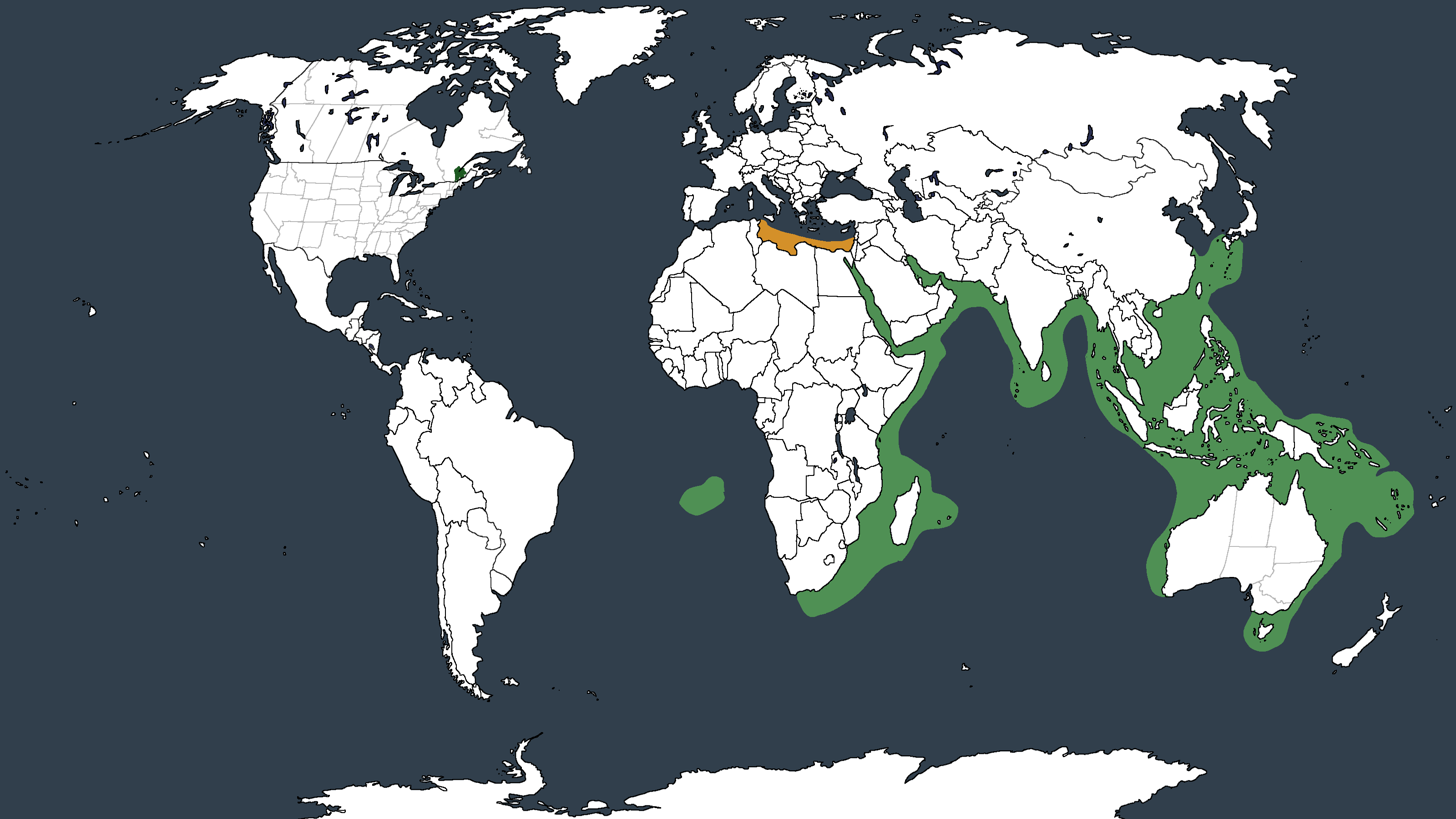

Synonyms
- Scomber commerson Lacepède, 1800; Scomber maculosus Shaw, 1803; Cybium konam Bleeker, 1851; Cybium multifasciatum Kishinouye, 1915

= Narrow-barred Spanish mackerel =

Species of fish

The narrow-barred Spanish mackerel (Scomberomorus commerson) is a mackerel of the family Scombridae found in a wide-ranging area in Southeast Asia, but as far west as the east coast of Africa and from the Middle East and along the northern coastal areas of the Indian Ocean, and as far east as the South West Pacific Ocean.

== Description ==
They are vivid blue to dark grey in colour along their backs and flanks and fade to a silvery blue-grey on the belly. Spanish mackerel have scores of narrow, vertical lines down their sides. Spanish mackerel grow to about 200 cm and up to 70 kg. They are the largest of all Australian mackerels.

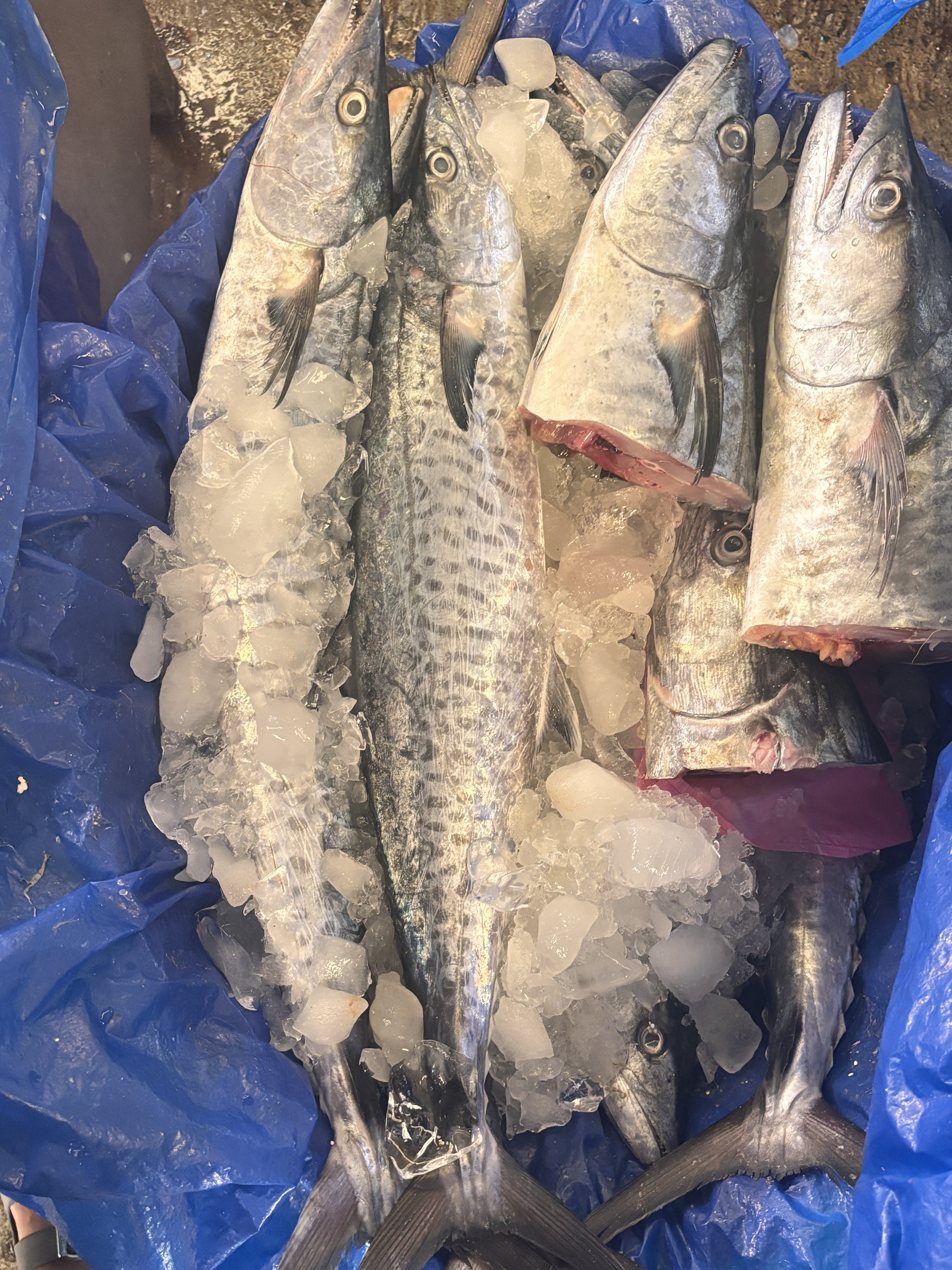
Scomberomorus commerson from Mangaluru, karnataka, india

== Distribution and habitat ==
Scomberomorus commerson is found in a wide area centering in Southeast Asia, but as far west as the east coast of Africa and from the Persian Gulf and along the northern coastal areas of the Indian Ocean, and as far east as Fiji in the South West Pacific ocean. The species is common down both sides of Australia as far south as Perth on the west coast and Sydney on the east coast. It is also found as far north as China and even Japan. Recorded first in the Mediterranean Sea in 1935 off Mandatory Palestine, it is now very common in the eastern Levant where it has become an important target species for local fisheries.

== Life cycle ==
Spanish mackerel spawn in oceanic conditions on reef edges. Eggs have a large oil droplet that aids in buoyancy and keeps them at the top of the water column which is warmer, well oxygenated, and has an abundant planktonic food supply for the larvae once they are hatched. When in the larval stage, Spanish mackerel are believed to stay in their own species-specific groups and are not normally found with other species of the same genus, such as S. semifasciatus and S. queenslandicus. This is not always the case with adult mackerel, where occasional mixing of different species within the same genus can occur.

Spawning is seasonal, but it is protracted in the warmer waters of the tropics. Many of the fisheries that target this species are based on prespawning feeding aggregations. A significant proportion of the female fish caught in Northern Territory waters between July and December have either recently spawned or are close to spawning. In general, spawning times for Spanish mackerel tend to be associated with higher water temperatures that promote optimal food availability for the rapid growth and development of the larvae.

As the young larvae grow, they move from the offshore spawning grounds to inshore and estuarine habitats, where they are frequently found in the juvenile phase of their growth cycle. In the inshore environments, they feed mostly on the larvae and juveniles of small fish and crustaceans until they become large enough to eat small fish and squid. Australian studies of this species suggest females are larger than males. Female Spanish mackerel mature at about two years of age or around 80 cm in length.

== Feeding habits ==
Spanish mackerel are voracious, opportunistic carnivores. As with other members of the genus, food consists mainly of small fishes with lesser quantities of shrimp and squid.

== Fisheries, fishing gear and methods ==
Global capture production of Narrow-barred Spanish mackerel (Scomberomorus commerson) in thousand tonnes from 1950 to 2022, as reported by the FAO

Spanish mackerel are highly valued fish throughout their range in the Indo-West Pacific. Recreational anglers catch them from boats while trolling or drifting and from boats, piers, jetties, and beaches by casting spoons and jigs, and live-bait fishing. Commercial methods are primarily run-around gillnetting, and rarely, by trolling lures similar to those used by recreational anglers.

=== Australia ===
As of July 2023, the Government of Queensland, Australia, cut the commercial catch limit from 578 tonnes (569 long tons; 637 short tons) to 165 tonnes (162 long tons; 182 short tons), a reduction to 27.5% of the earlier limit. The split was: 60% commercial; 40% recreational (1/person) but also includes charter boat fishing; Indigenous 2 tonnes/year limit across all allocations. This is intended to revitalise of the biomass over time.

=== Taiwan ===
In Penghu, Taiwan the narrow-barred Spanish mackerel is highly valued and referred to as "white gold." In 2022 an exceptional 34 kilo fish was sold for more than $3,000. In Tainan it is used to make the dish tutuo yugeng (土魠魚羹, Spanish Mackerel thick soup).

== Aquaculture ==
In 2023 the Taiwanese Fisheries Research Institute succeeded in artificially breeding narrow-barred Spanish mackerel.

== Parasites ==
As with most fish, the narrow-barred Spanish mackerel is infected by a variety of parasites. Spectacular parasites are the cysts of the larvae of the trypanorhynch cestode Callitetrarhynchus gracilis, often found in great numbers in the body cavity.

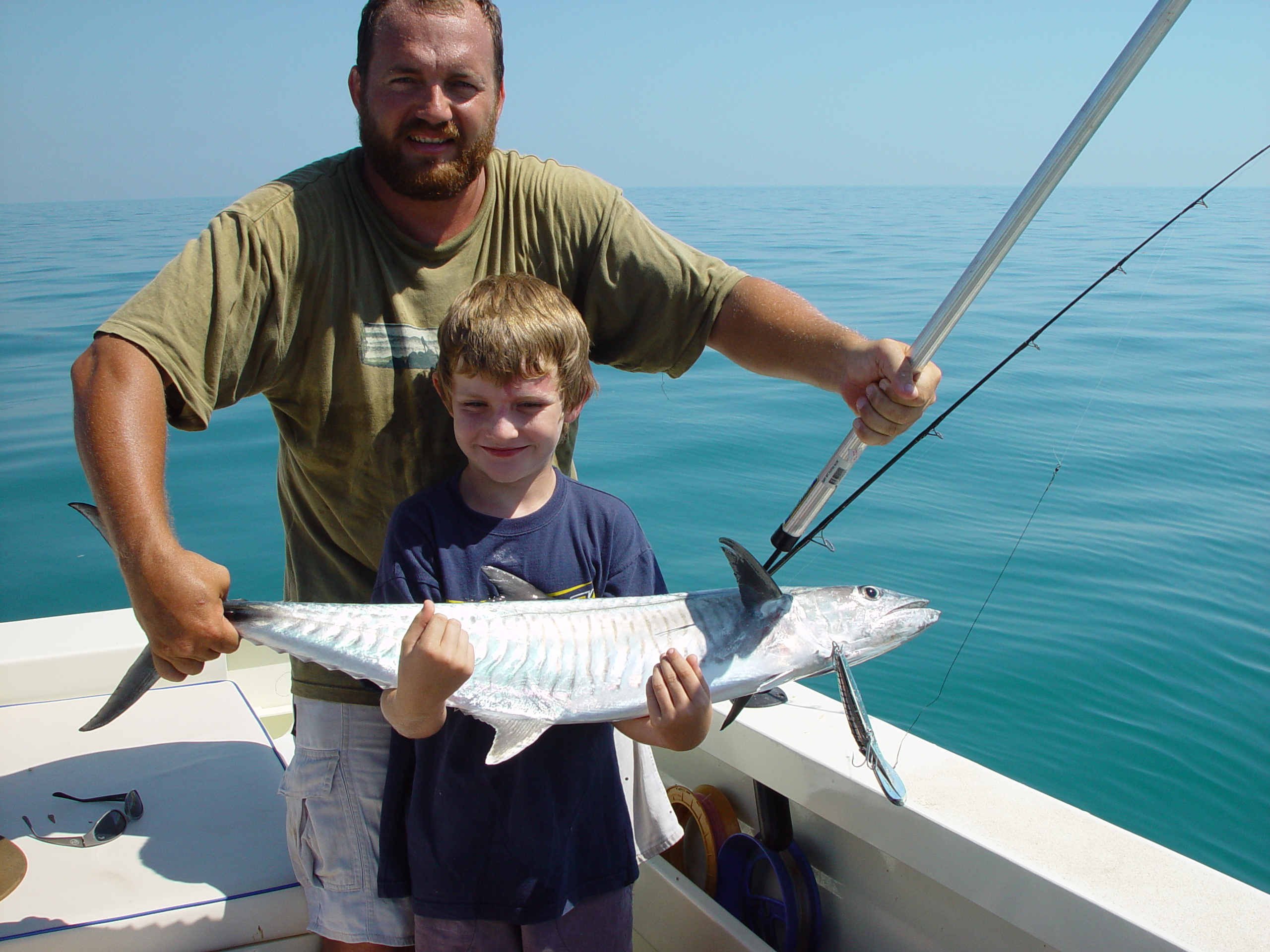
Young angler with an average-sized Spanish mackerel off Darwin, Northern Territory

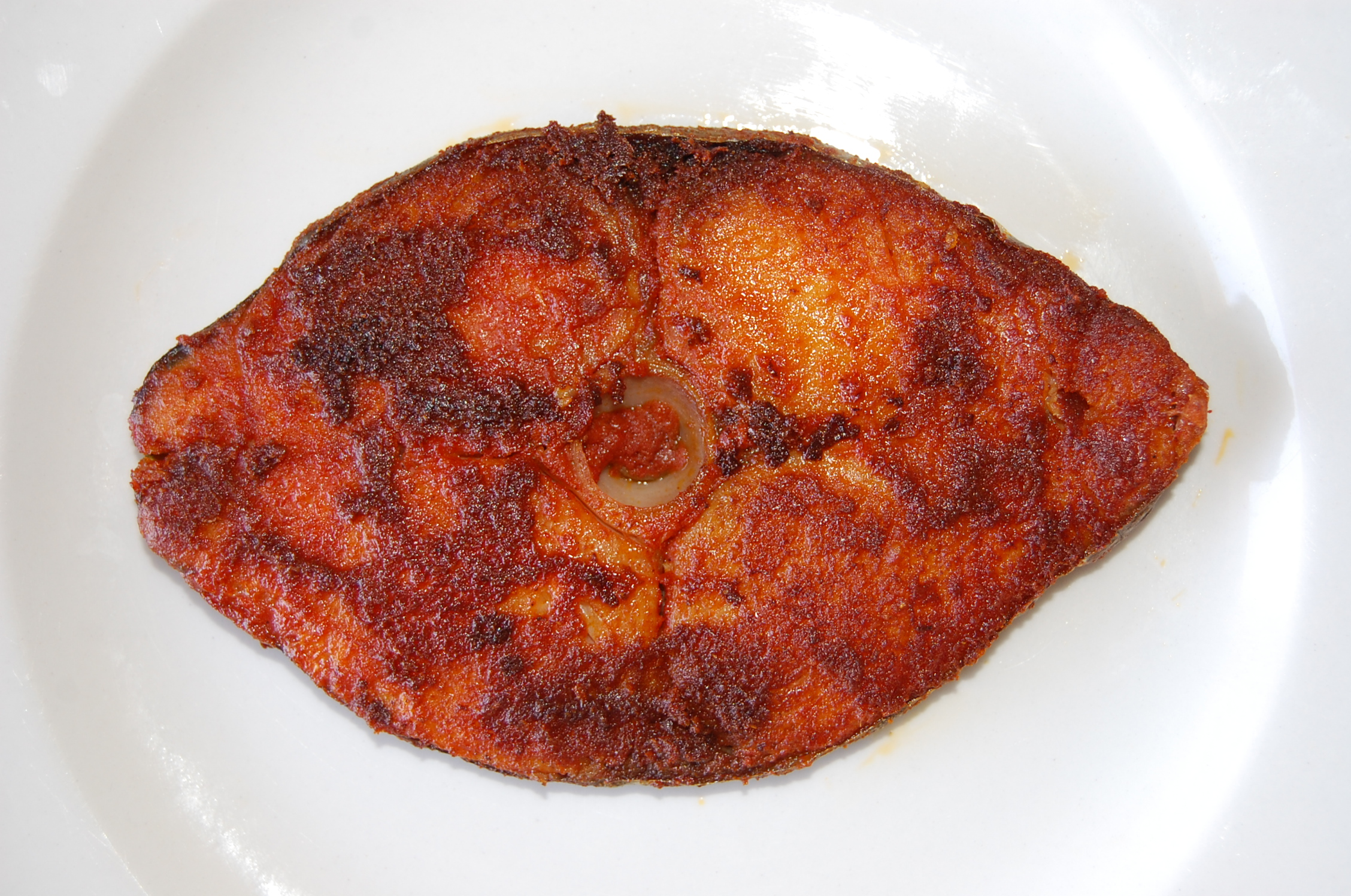
Seer Fish Fry, a common dish in the south Indian state of Kerala

== Common names ==
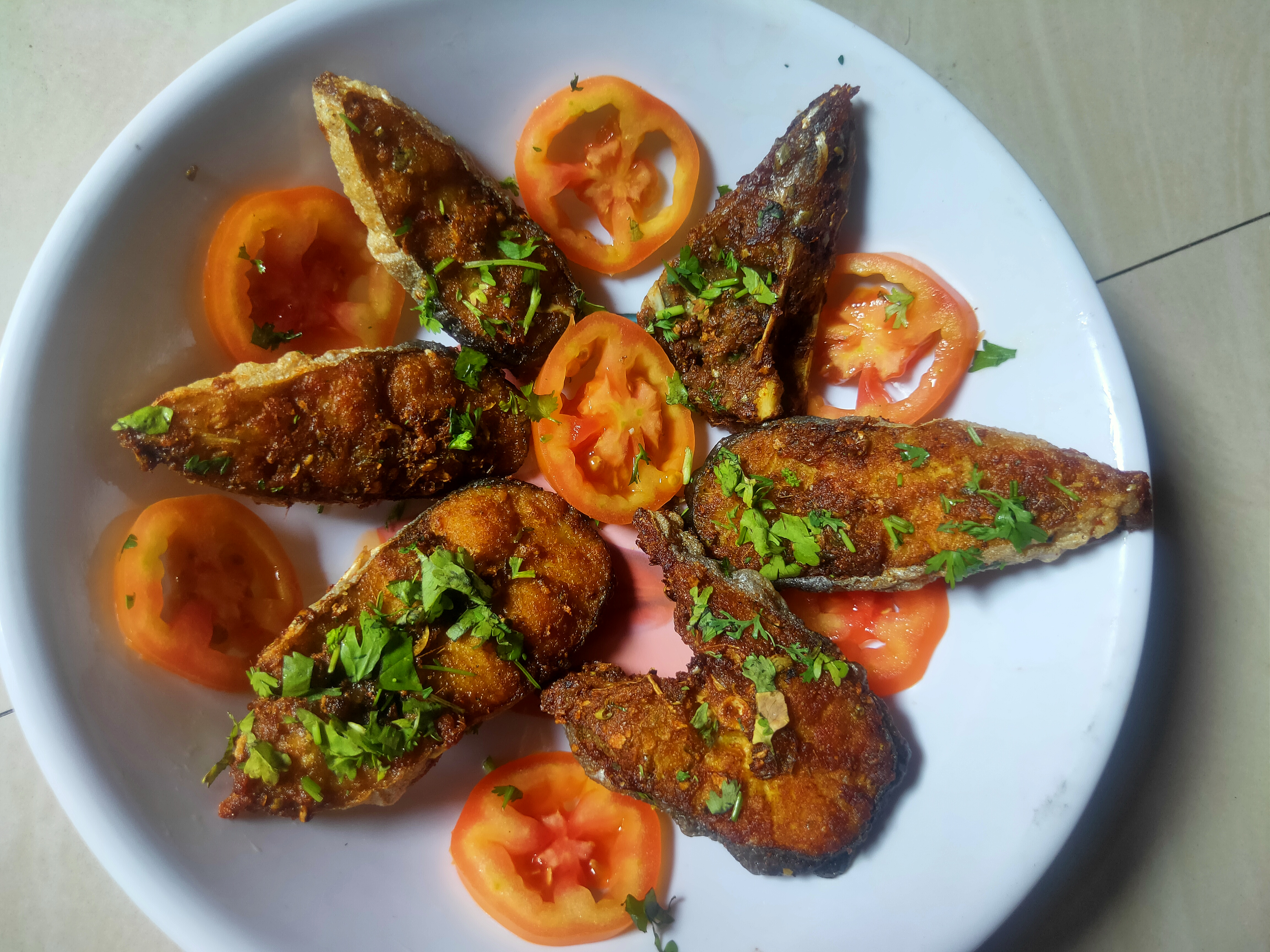
Fried surmai fish

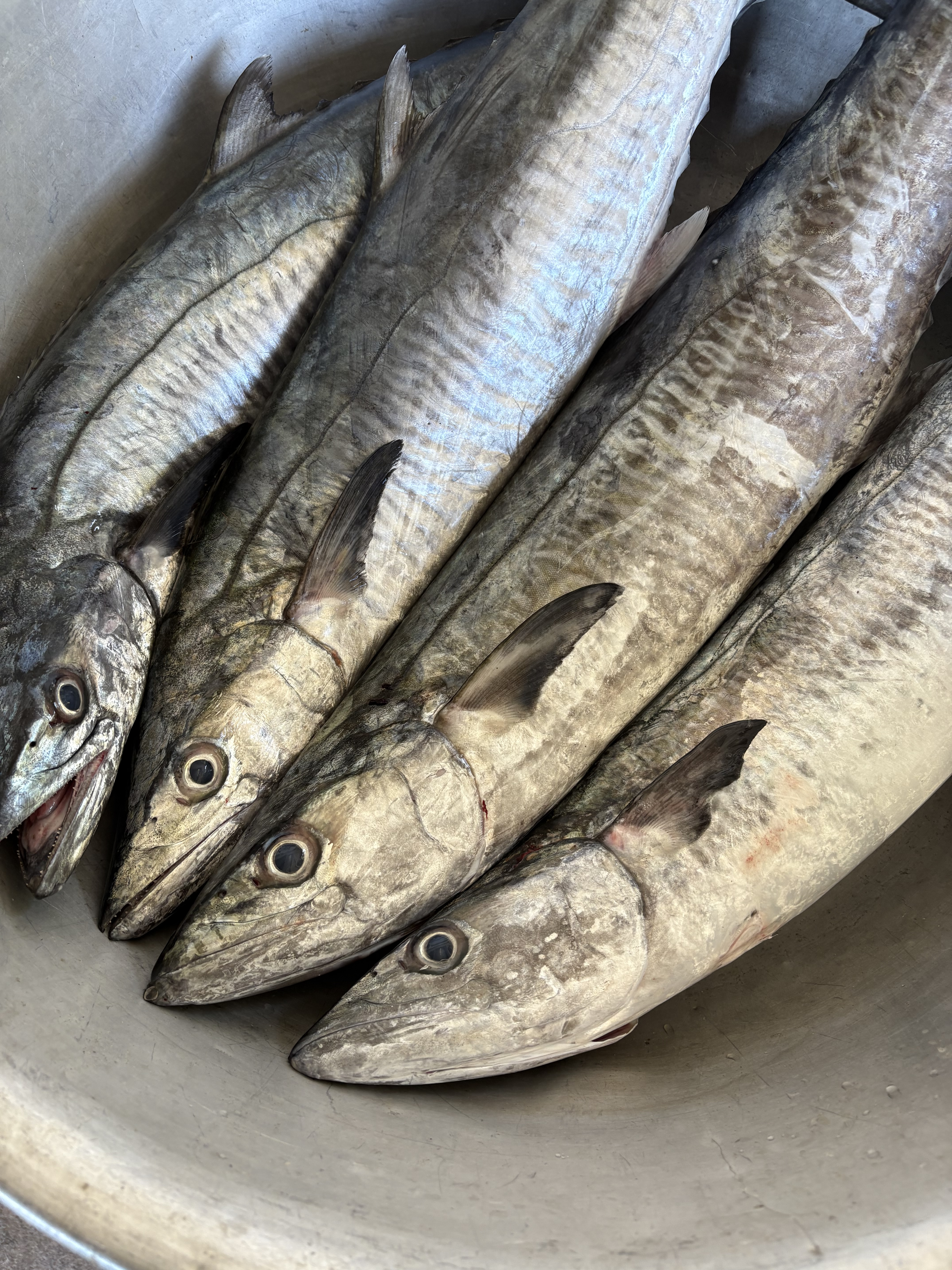
- A fresh catch of Narrow-barred Spanish Mackerel (known locally as plā xinthrī ) in a metal basin in Chanthaburi, Thailand
  Pakistan: Surmei سرمٸ
- South Africa: king mackerel, couta, cuda
- Malaysia: tenggiri
- Singapore: Batang (巴当鱼)
- Australia: narrow-bar, narrow-barred mackerel, snook, Spaniard, Spanish mackerel
- USA: barred mackerel, narrow-barred mackerel, striped seer
- Arabic: In Lebanon, it is called "abu sinn ابو سن" or"ghazal غزال", in Egypt 's Mediterranean and the Red Sea it is "Dirak ديرك", while in Arab states of the Persian Gulf, it is kanaad, kanad or kana'd كنعد pronounced 'Chanaad', according to the local dialect inflection, despite the sound 'ch' not existing in the Arabic language.
- India: konem in Telugu, vanjaram in Tamil, anjal in Tulu, Shermai in Dhakhani Urdu,Surmai In Marathi, "Neymeen(നെയ്മീൻ)" "Aykoora(അയക്കൂറ)" in Malayalam
- Iran: shir mahi شیرماهی
- Israel: Palamida (פלמידה), Squmbren zariz (סקומברן זריז, meaning quick Spanish mackerel)
- Philippines: tanigue
- Indonesia: ikan tenggiri
- Sri Lanka: Thora in Sinhalese, vanjaram in Tamil
- Somalia: Yuumbi
- Fiji: walu
- Thailand: plā xinthrī (ปลาอินทรี)
- Türkiye: ceylan palamutu, ceylan balığı
- Libyan: yamaneyah يمنيه.
- Taiwan: 土魠魚, "thô͘-thoh-hî", "tǔtuōyú"
- Dutch: koningsvis
- South China: majia (馬加魚)

== See also ==
- Mackerel as food
