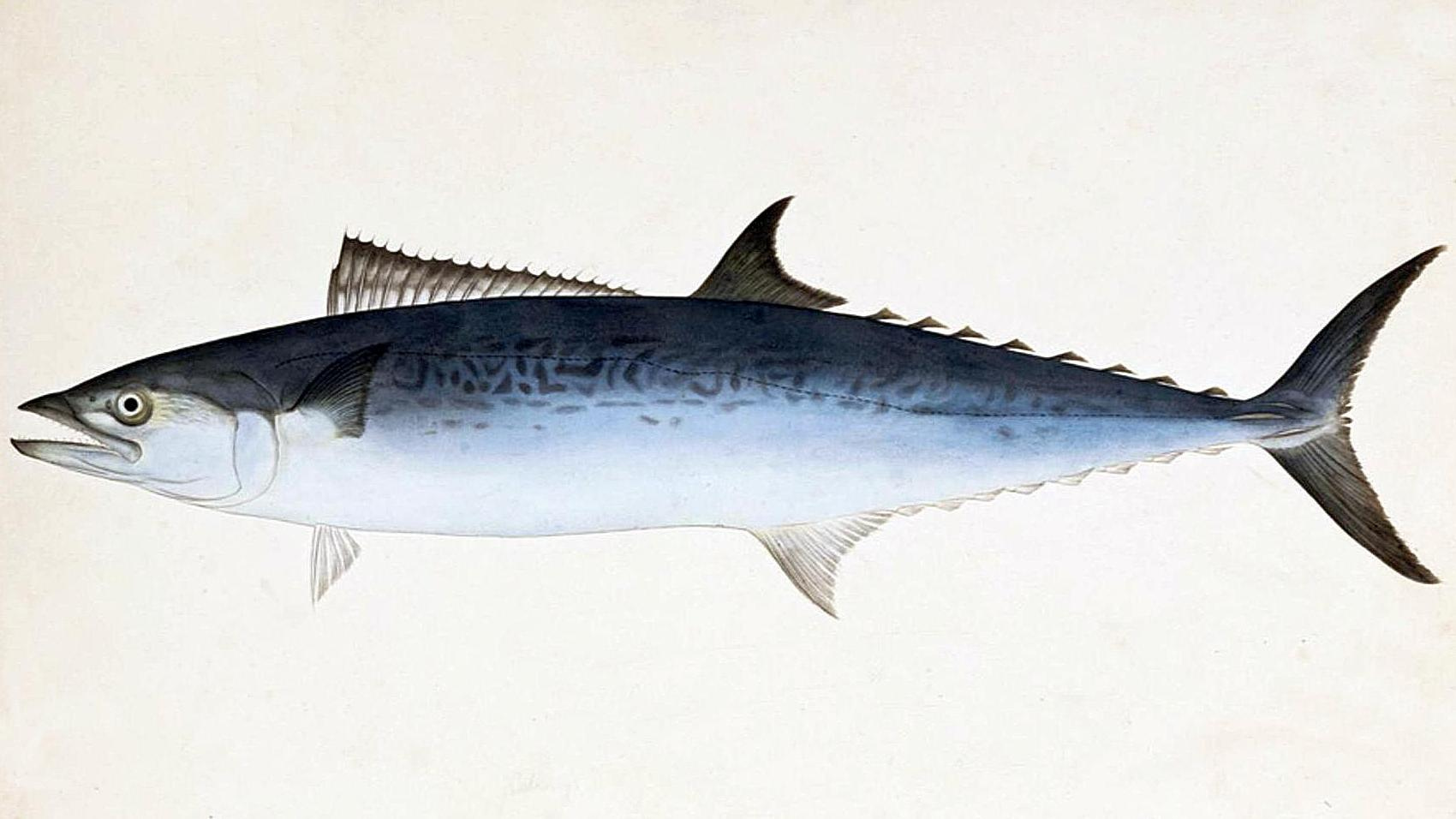

- In Kyoto, Japan

Conservation status
- Near Threatened (IUCN 3.1)

Scientific classification
- Kingdom: Animalia
- Phylum: Chordata
- Class: Actinopterygii
- Division: Teleostei
- Order: Scombriformes
- Family: Scombridae
- Genus: Scomberomorus
- Species: S. niphonius

Binomial name
- Scomberomorus niphonius (Cuvier, 1832)
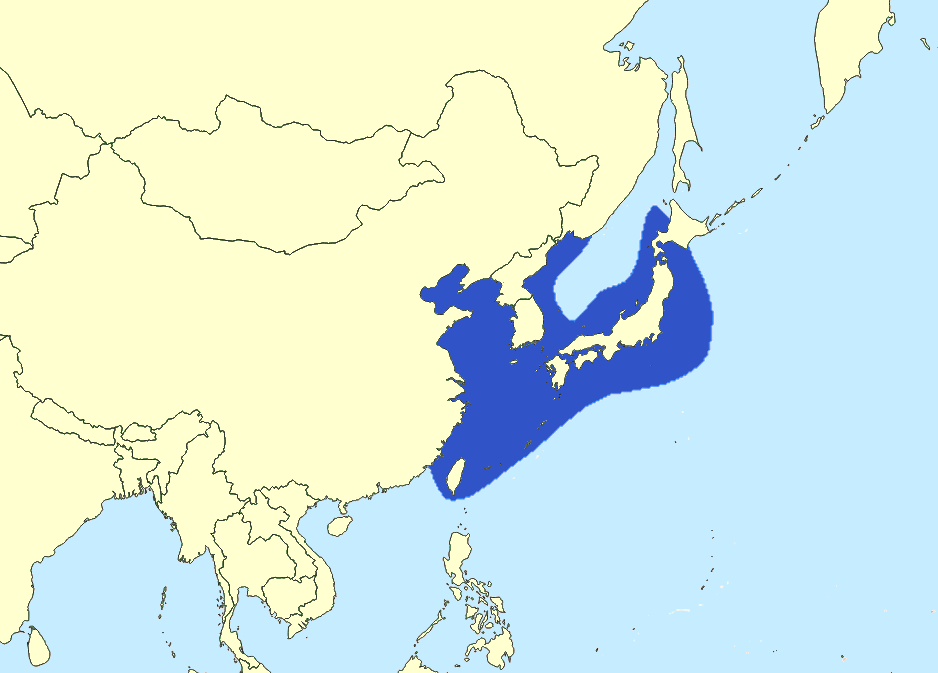

Synonyms
- Cybium niphonium Cuvier, 1832; Sawara niphonia (Cuvier, 1832); Cybium gracile Günther, 1873

= Japanese Spanish mackerel =

Species of fish

The Japanese Spanish mackerel (Scomberomorus niphonius), also known as the Japanese seer fish, is a species of true mackerel in the scombrid family (Scombridae).

Their maximum reported length is 100 cm, and the maximum reported weight is 10.57 kg.

== Fisheries ==
Japanese Spanish mackerel is an important species for fisheries in east Asia. South Korea is the country reporting the biggest annual catches, followed by Japan and Taiwan. These added up to a relatively modest total catch of about 56,000 tonnes in 2009. However, China reports very large catches of unidentified seer fish (Scomberomorus spp., fluctuating around 400,000 tonnes in 2000–2009), without reporting catches of any single Scomberomorus species. It is likely that these catches include a significant proportion of Japanese Spanish mackerel.

Global capture production of S. niphonius in thousands of tonnes (1950–2022), as reported by the FAO

At a Dalian seafood market

== As food ==
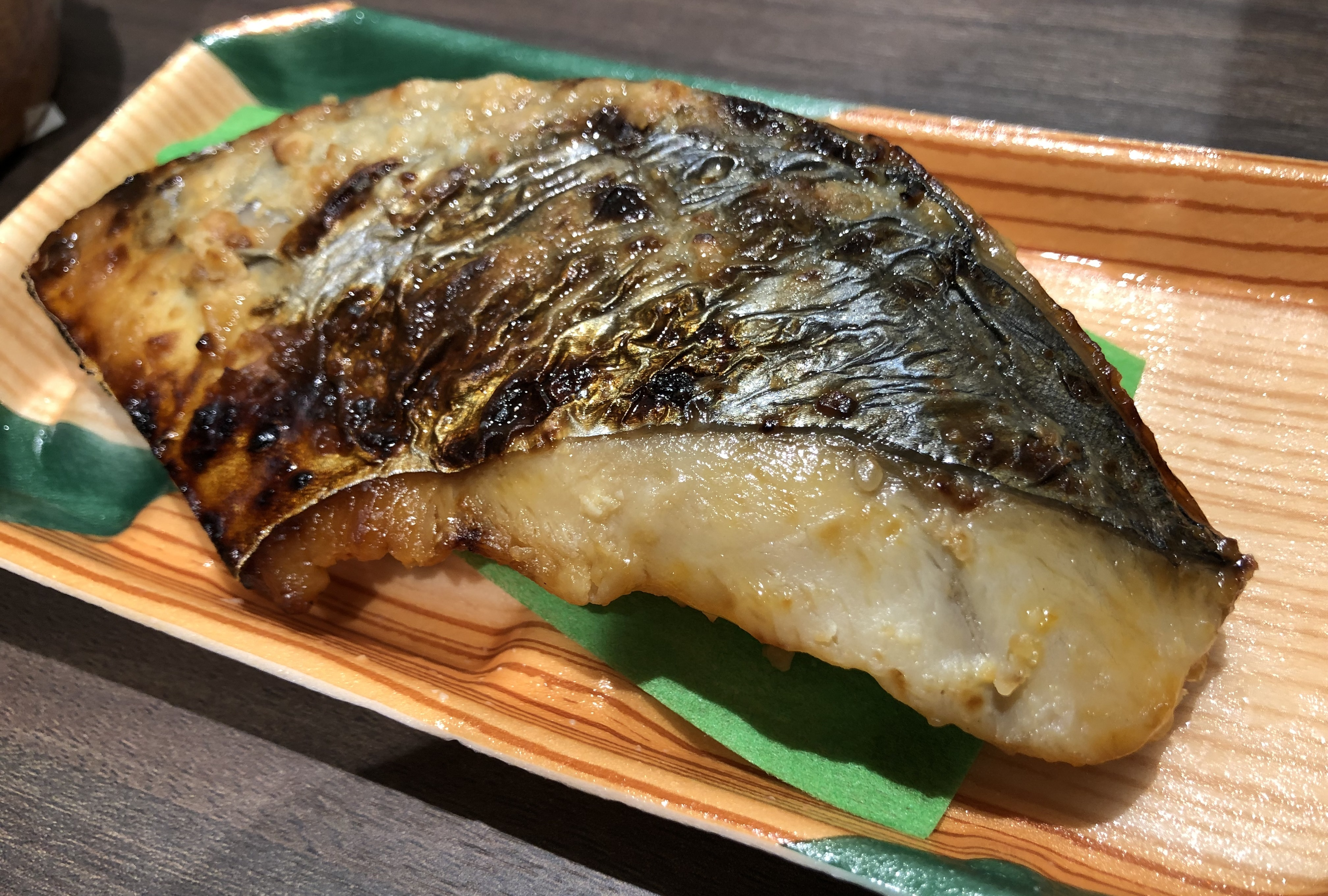
Grilled

Japanese Spanish mackerel is commonly served grilled or pan-fried in Korea as samchi-gui (food). Japanese Spanish mackerel is often served as sushi, under the Japanese name sawara (鰆, サワラ).
