= Mackerel =

Pelagic fish

External videos
- Bluefin Baitball YouTube
- Atlantic Mackerel Purse Seining 2007 YouTube

Mackerel

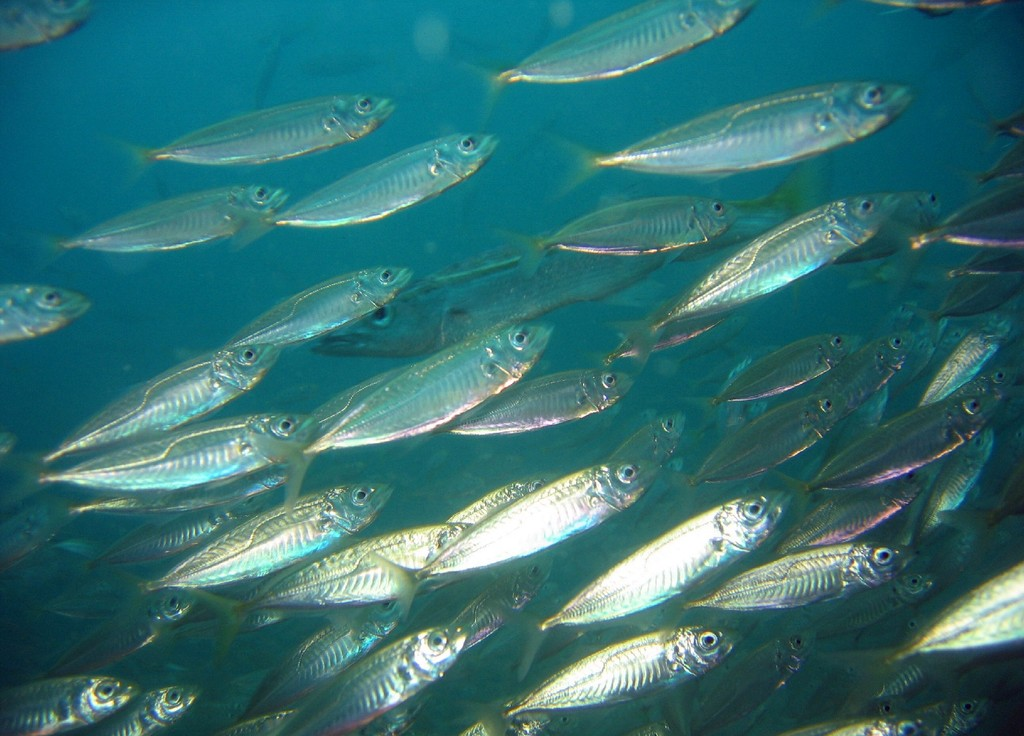
Some species of mackerel migrate in schools for long distances along the coast and others across oceans

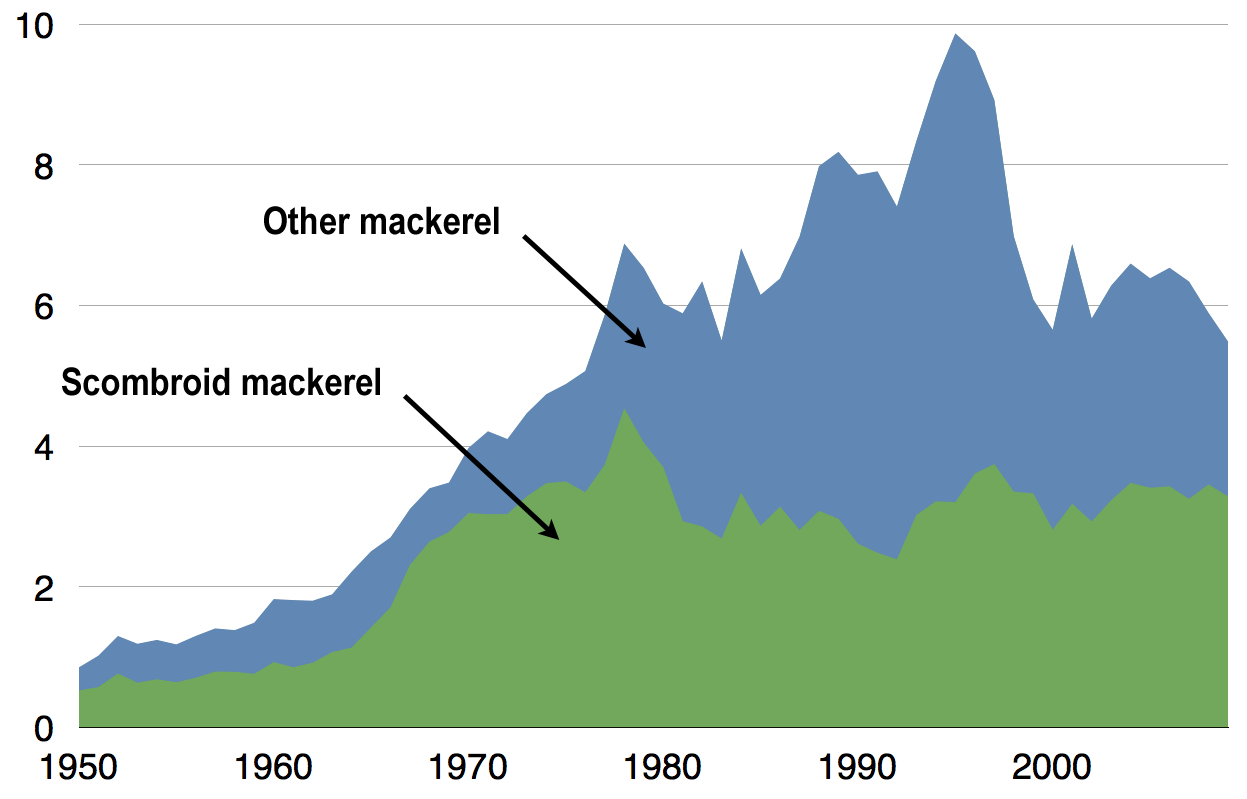
Global commercial capture of mackerel in millions of tonnes reported by the FAO 1950–2009

Mackerel is a common name applied to a number of different species of pelagic fish, mostly from the family Scombridae. They are found in both temperate and tropical seas, typically in the open ocean but occasionally along the coast. Mackerel species typically have deeply forked tails and vertical "tiger-like" stripes on their backs with an iridescent green-blue quality. Many are restricted in their distribution ranges and live in separate populations or fish stocks based on geography. Some stocks migrate in large schools along the coast to suitable spawning grounds, where they spawn in fairly shallow waters. After spawning they return the way they came in smaller schools to suitable feeding grounds, often near an area of upwelling. From there they may move offshore into deeper waters and spend the winter in relative inactivity. Other stocks migrate across oceans.

Smaller mackerel are forage fish for larger predators, including larger mackerel and Atlantic cod. Flocks of seabirds, whales, dolphins, sharks, and schools of larger fish such as tuna and marlin follow mackerel schools and attack them in sophisticated and cooperative ways. Mackerel flesh is high in omega-3 oils and is intensively harvested by humans. In 2009, over 5 million tons were landed by commercial fishermen. Sport fishermen value the fighting abilities of the king mackerel.

== Species ==
Over 30 different species, principally belonging to the family Scombridae, are commonly referred to as mackerel. The term "mackerel" is derived from Old French and may have originally meant either "marked, spotted" or "pimp, procurer". The latter connection is not altogether clear, but mackerel spawn enthusiastically in shoals near the coast, and medieval ideas on animal procreation were creative.

=== Scombroid mackerels ===
About 21 species in the family Scombridae are commonly called mackerel. The type species for the scombroid mackerel is the Atlantic mackerel, Scomber scombrus. Until recently, Atlantic chub mackerel and Indo-Pacific chub mackerel were thought to be subspecies of the same species. In 1999, Collette established, on molecular and morphological considerations, that these are separate species. Mackerel are smaller with shorter lifecycles than their close relatives, the tuna, which are of the same family.

==== Scombrini, the true mackerels ====
The true mackerels belong to the tribe Scombrini. The tribe consists of seven species, each belonging to one of two genera: Scomber or Rastrelliger.

True Mackerels (tribe Scombrini)
Common name	Scientific name	Maximum length	Common length	Maximum weight	Maximum age	Trophic level	FishBase	FAO	IUCN status
Short mackerel	Rastrelliger brachysoma (Bleeker, 1851)	34.5 cm (13.6 in)	20 cm (7.9 in)			2.72			Vulnerable
Island mackerel	R. faughni (Matsui, 1967)	20 cm (7.9 in)		0.75 kg (1.7 lb)		3.4			Vulnerable
Indian mackerel	R. kanagurta (Cuvier, 1816)	35 cm (14 in)	25 cm (9.8 in)		4 years	3.19			Least concern
Blue mackerel	Scomber australasicus (Cuvier, 1832)	44 cm (17 in)	30 cm (12 in)	1.36 kg (3.0 lb)		4.2			Least concern
Atlantic chub mackerel	S. colias (Gmelin, 1789)	65 cm (26 in)		2.9 kg (6.4 lb)	20 years	3.91			Least concern
Chub mackerel	S. japonicus (Houttuyn, 1782)	64 cm (25 in)	30 cm (12 in)	2.9 kg (6.4 lb)	18 years	3.09			Least concern
Atlantic mackerel	S. scombrus (Linnaeus, 1758)	66 cm (26 in)	30 cm (12 in)	3.4 kg (7.5 lb)	12 years west 18 years east	3.65			Least concern

==== Scomberomorini, the Spanish mackerels ====
The Spanish mackerels belong to the tribe Scomberomorini, which is the "cousin tribe" of the true mackerels. This tribe consists of 21 species in all—18 of those are classified into the genus Scomberomorus, two into Grammatorcynus, and a single species into the monotypic genus Acanthocybium.

Spanish Mackerels (tribe Scomberomorini)
Common name	Scientific name	Maximum length	Common length	Maximum weight	Maximum age	Trophic level	FishBase	FAO	IUCN status
Wahoo	Acanthocybium solandri (Cuvier in Cuvier and Valenciennes, 1832)	250 cm (98 in)	170 cm (67 in)	83 kg (183 lb)	9 years	4.4			Least concern
Shark mackerel	Grammatorcynus bicarinatus (Quoy & Gaimard, 1825)	112 cm (44 in)		13.5 kg (30 lb)		4.5			Least concern
Double-lined mackerel	G. bilineatus (Rüppell, 1836)	100 cm (39 in)	50 cm (20 in)	3.5 kg (7.7 lb)		4.18			Least concern
Serra Spanish mackerel	Scomberomorus brasiliensis (Collette, Russo & Zavala-Camin, 1978)	125 cm (49 in)	65 cm (26 in)	6.7 kg (15 lb)		3.31			Least concern
King mackerel	S. cavalla (Cuvier, 1829)	184 cm (72 in)	70 cm (28 in)	45 kg (99 lb)	14 years	4.5			Least concern
Narrow-barred Spanish mackerel	S. commerson (Lacepède, 1800)	240 cm (94 in)	120 cm (47 in)	70 kg (150 lb)		4.5			Near threatened
Monterrey Spanish mackerel	S. concolor (Lockington, 1879)	87 cm (34 in)		3.6 kg (7.9 lb)		4.24			Near threatened
Indo-Pacific king mackerel	S. guttatus (Bloch & Schneider, 1801)	81.5 cm (32.1 in)	55 cm (22 in)	4.5 kg (9.9 lb)	16 years	4.28			Data deficient
Korean mackerel	S. koreanus (Kishinouye, 1915)	150 cm (59 in)	60 cm (24 in)	15 kg (33 lb)		4.2			Least concern
Streaked Spanish mackerel	S. lineolatus (Cuvier, 1829)	80 cm (31 in)	70 cm (28 in)	4.1 kg (9.0 lb)		4.5			Least concern
Atlantic Spanish mackerel	S. maculatus (Mitchill, 1815)	91 cm (36 in)		5.89 kg (13.0 lb)	5 years	4.5			Least concern
Papuan Spanish mackerel	S. multiradiatus Munro, 1964	35 cm (14 in)		0.5 kg (1.1 lb)		4.0			Least concern
Australian spotted mackerel	S. munroi (Collette & Russo, 1980)	104 cm (41 in)		10.2 kg (22 lb)		4.3			Near threatened
Japanese Spanish mackerel	S. niphonius (Cuvier, 1832)	113 cm (44 in)		10.5 kg (23 lb)		4.5			Near threatened
Queen mackerel	S. plurilineatus Fourmanoir, 1966	120 cm (47 in)		12.5 kg (28 lb)		4.2			Data deficient
Queensland school mackerel	S. queenslandicus (Munro, 1943)	100 cm (39 in)	80 cm (31 in)	12.2 kg (27 lb)	10 years	4.5			Least concern
Cero mackerel	S. regalis (Bloch, 1793)	183 cm (72 in)		8.2 kg (18 lb)		4.5			Least concern
Broadbarred king mackerel	S. semifasciatus (Macleay, 1883)	120 cm (47 in)		10 kg (22 lb)	10 years	4.5			Least concern
Pacific sierra	S. sierra (Cuvier, 1832)	99 cm (39 in)	60 cm (24 in)	8.2 kg (18 lb)		4.5			Least concern
Chinese mackerel	S. sinensis (Cuvier, 1832)	247 cm (97 in)	100 cm (39 in)	131 kg (289 lb)		4.5			Near threatened
West African Spanish mackerel	S. tritor (Cuvier, 1832)	100 cm (39 in)	75 cm (30 in)	6 kg (13 lb)		4.26			Least concern

=== Other mackerel ===
In addition, a number of species with mackerel-like characteristics in the families Carangidae, Hexagrammidae and Gempylidae are commonly referred to as mackerel. Some confusion had occurred between the Pacific jack mackerel (Trachurus symmetricus) and the heavily harvested Chilean jack mackerel (T. murphyi). These have been thought at times to be the same species, but are now recognized as separate species.

Other mackerel species
Family	Common name	Scientific name	Maximum length	Common length	Maximum weight	Maximum age	Trophic level	FishBase	FAO	IUCN status
Scombridae; Gasterochisma	Butterfly mackerel	Gasterochisma melampus Richardson, 1845	164 cm (65 in)		50 kg (110 lb)		4.4			Least concern
Carangidae; Jack mackerel	Mackerel Scad	Decapterus macarellus (Culiver, 1833)	46 cm (18 in)	30 cm (12 in)			4.0			Least concern
Carangidae; Jack mackerel	Atlantic horse mackerel	Trachurus trachurus (Linnaeus, 1758)	70 cm (28 in)	22 cm (8.7 in)	2.0 kg (4.4 lb)		3.64			Vulnerable
Carangidae; Jack mackerel	Blue jack mackerel	T. picturatus (Bowdich, 1825)	60 cm (24 in)	25 cm (9.8 in)		18 years	3.32			Least concern
Carangidae; Jack mackerel	Cape horse mackerel	T. capensis (Castelnau, 1861)	60 cm (24 in)	30 cm (12 in)			3.47			Least concern
Carangidae; Jack mackerel	Chilean jack mackerel	T. murphyi (Nichols, 1920)	70 cm (28 in)	45 cm (18 in)		16 years	3.49			Data deficient
Carangidae; Jack mackerel	Cunene horse mackerel	T. trecae (Cadenat, 1950)	35 cm (14 in)		2.0 kg (4.4 lb)		3.49			Least concern
Carangidae; Jack mackerel	Greenback horse mackerel	T. declivis (Jenyns, 1841)	64 cm (25 in)	42 cm (17 in)		25 years	3.93			Least concern
Carangidae; Jack mackerel	Japanese horse mackerel	T. japonicus (Temminck & Schlegel, 1844)	50 cm (20 in)	35 cm (14 in)	0.66 kg (1.5 lb)	12 years	3.4			Near threatened
Carangidae; Jack mackerel	Mediterranean horse mackerel	T. mediterraneus (Steindachner, 1868)	60 cm (24 in)	30 cm (12 in)			3.59			Least concern
Carangidae; Jack mackerel	Pacific jack mackerel	T. symmetricus (Ayres, 1855)	81 cm (32 in)	55 cm (22 in)		30 years	3.56			Least concern
Carangidae; Jack mackerel	Yellowtail horse mackerel	T. novaezelandiae (Richardson, 1843)	50 cm (20 in)	35 cm (14 in)		25 years	4.5			Least concern
Gempylidae; Snake mackerel	Black snake mackerel	Nealotus tripes (Johnson, 1865)	25 cm (9.8 in)	15 cm (5.9 in)			4.2			Least concern
Gempylidae; Snake mackerel	Blacksail snake mackerel	Thyrsitoides marleyi (Fowler, 1929)	200 cm (79 in)	100 cm (39 in)			4.19			Not assessed
Gempylidae; Snake mackerel	Snake mackerel	Gempylus serpens (Cuvier, 1829)	100 cm (39 in)	60 cm (24 in)			4.35			Least concern
Gempylidae; Snake mackerel	Violet snake mackerel	Nesiarchus nasutus (Johnson, 1862)	130 cm (51 in)	80 cm (31 in)			4.33			Least concern
Gempylidae; Snake mackerel	White snake mackerel	Thyrsitops lepidopoides (Cuvier, 1832)	40 cm (16 in)	25 cm (9.8 in)			3.86			Not assessed
Hexagrammidae	Okhotsk atka mackerel	Pleurogrammus azonus (Jordan & Metz, 1913)	62 cm (24 in)		1.6 kg (3.5 lb)	12 years	3.58			Not assessed
Hexagrammidae	Atka mackerel	P. monopterygius (Pallas, 1810)	56.5 cm (22.2 in)		2.0 kg (4.4 lb)	14 years	3.33			Not assessed

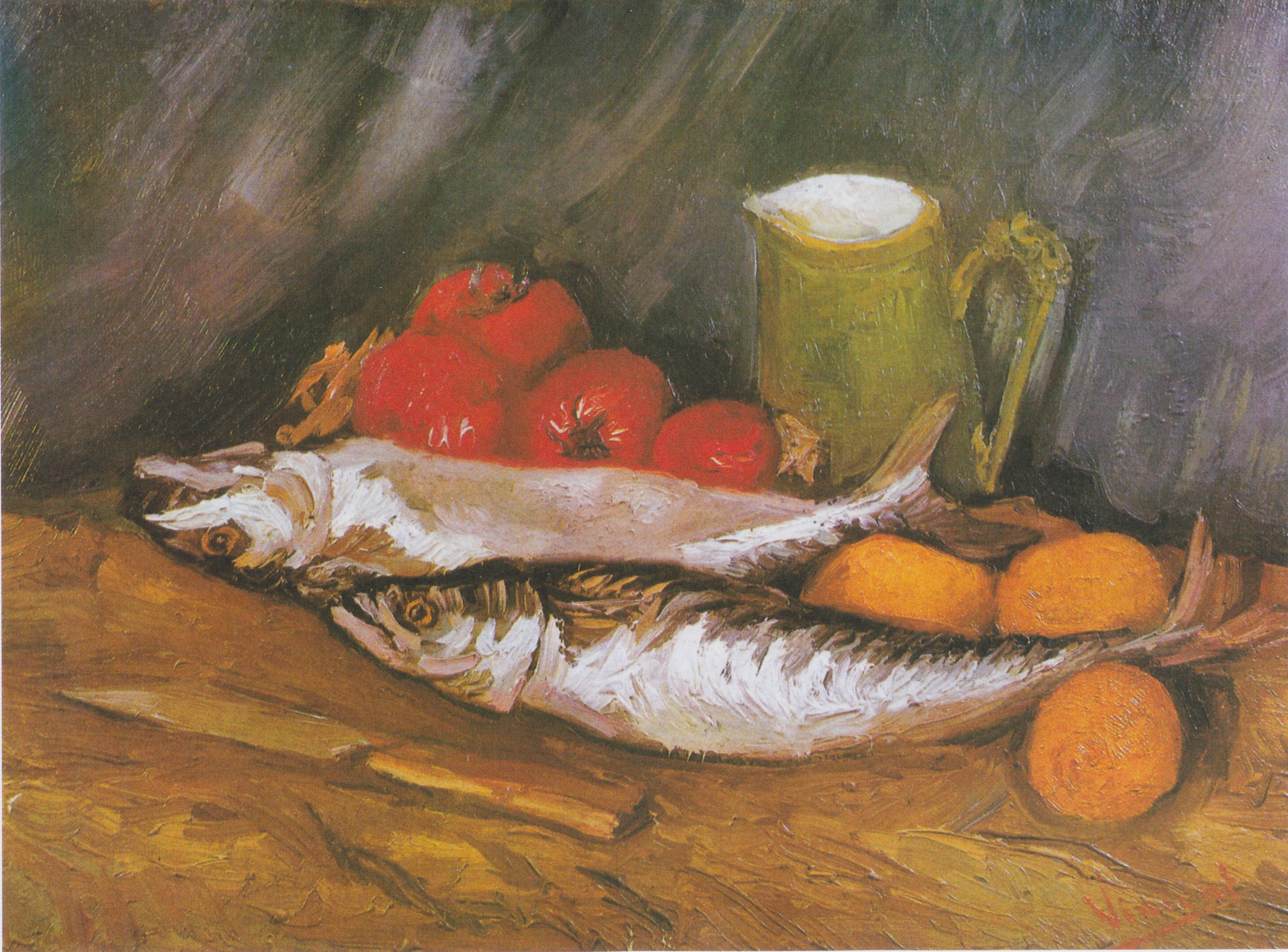
Still life with mackerel, lemon and tomato, Van Gogh, 1886

The term "mackerel" is also used as a modifier in the common names of other fish, sometimes indicating the fish has vertical stripes similar to a scombroid mackerel:

- Mackerel icefish—Champsocephalus gunnari
- Mackerel pike—Cololabis saira
- Mackerel shark—several species
- Shortfin mako shark—Isurus oxyrinchus
- Mackerel tuna—Euthynnus affinis
- Mackerel tail goldfish—Carassius auratus

By extension, the term is applied also to other species such as the mackerel tabby cat, and to inanimate objects such as the altocumulus mackerel sky cloud formation.

== Characteristics (Scombridae) ==
Like other scombroids, mackerel such as this Atlantic mackerel are superb swimmers, and can retract their fins into grooves on their bodies for streamlining. They have deeply forked tails and are smaller and slimmer than tuna.

Most mackerel belong to the family Scombridae, which also includes tuna and bonito. Generally, mackerel are much smaller and slimmer than tuna, though in other respects, they share many common characteristics. Their scales, if present at all, are extremely small. Like tuna and bonito, mackerel are voracious feeders, and are swift and manoeuvrable swimmers, able to streamline themselves by retracting their fins into grooves on their bodies. Like other scombroids, they lack a swim bladder, and their bodies are cylindrical with numerous finlets on the dorsal and ventral sides behind the dorsal and anal fins, but unlike the deep-bodied tuna, they are slim.

The type species for scombroid mackerels is the Atlantic mackerel, Scomber scombrus. These fish are iridescent blue-green above with a silvery underbelly and near-vertical wavy black stripes running along their upper bodies.

The prominent stripes on the back of mackerels seemingly are there to provide camouflage against broken backgrounds. That is not the case, though, because mackerel live in midwater pelagic environments which have no background. However, fish have an optokinetic reflex in their visual systems that can be sensitive to moving stripes. For fish to school efficiently, they need feedback mechanisms that help them align themselves with adjacent fish, and match their speed. The stripes on neighbouring fish provide "schooling marks", which signal changes in relative position. The lateral line also helps with orderly schooling.

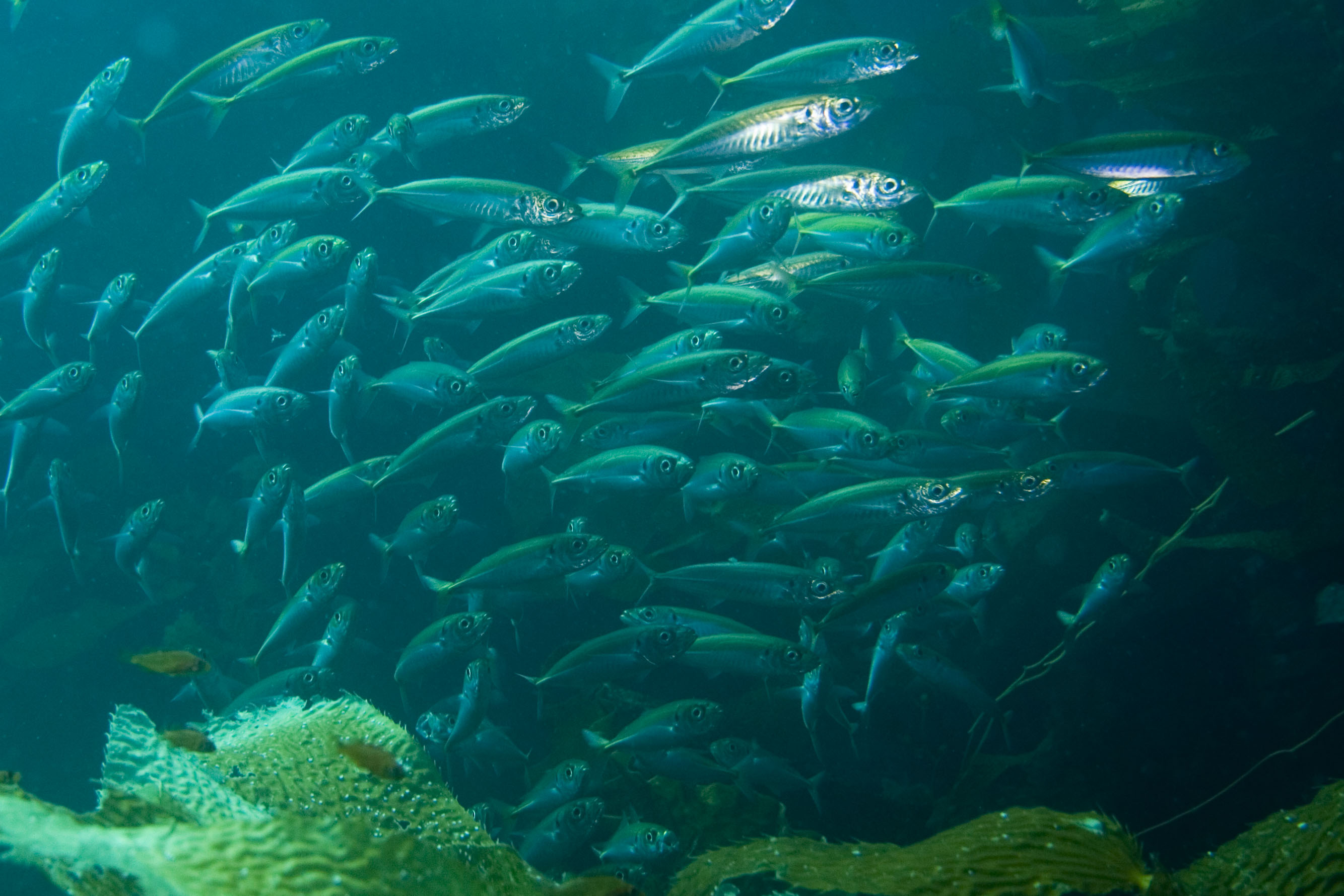
Mackerel, such as these Pacific jack mackerel, usually have vertical stripes on their sides which provide "schooling marks", visual clues that help them stay in formation as they school.

A layer of thin, reflecting platelets is seen on some of the mackerel stripes. In 1998, E J Denton and D M Rowe argued that these platelets transmit additional information to other fish about how a given fish moves. As the orientation of the fish changes relative to another fish, the amount of light reflected to the second fish by this layer also changes. This sensitivity to orientation gives the mackerel "considerable advantages in being able to react quickly while schooling and feeding."

Mackerel range in size from small forage fish to larger game fish. Coastal mackerel tend to be small. The king mackerel is an example of a larger mackerel. Most fish are cold-blooded, but exceptions exist. Certain species of fish maintain elevated body temperatures. Endothermic bony fishes are all in the suborder Scombroidei and include the butterfly mackerel, a species of primitive mackerel.

Mackerel are strong swimmers. Known in the latin family as "punctualis piscis" which translates to "punctual fish." This is due to its punctuality of migration during mating season as it moves from warm to cold waters. Atlantic mackerel can swim at a sustained speed of 0.98 m/sec with a burst speed of 5.5 m/sec, while chub mackerel can swim at a sustained speed of 0.92 m/sec with a burst speed of 2.25 m/sec. The Wahoo (Acanthocybium solandri) has been known to reach speeds of up to 78 km/h (48 mph).

== Distribution ==
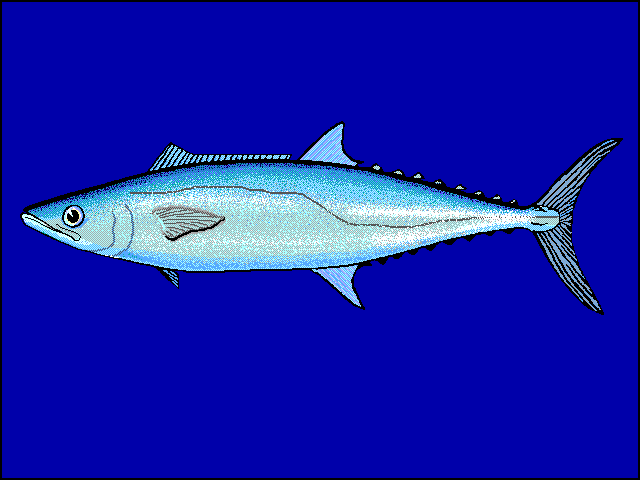
King mackerels (Scomberomorus cavalla) cruise on long migrations at 10 kilometres per hour (6.2 mph).

Most mackerel species have restricted distribution ranges, while others, like the Wahoo, are found in all oceans between 59°N and 48°S.

In combination, these fish (Scombroids) can be found worldwide in all oceans of the world, excluding the Southern and Arctic Oceans. However, the Atlantic chub mackerel has been spotted near Greenland in the Arctic Ocean on rare occasions as global warming makes the Arctic more habitable for them.

Some mackerel species, especially pelagic and filter feeding one such as chub mackerel, migrate vertically, staying at certain depths depending on the time of day and food availability.

For example, adult snake mackerel, conduct a diel vertical migration, staying in deeper water during the day and rising to the surface at night to feed. The young and juveniles also migrate vertically, but in the opposite direction, staying near the surface during the day and moving deeper at night.

== Lifecycle and ecology (Scombroids) ==
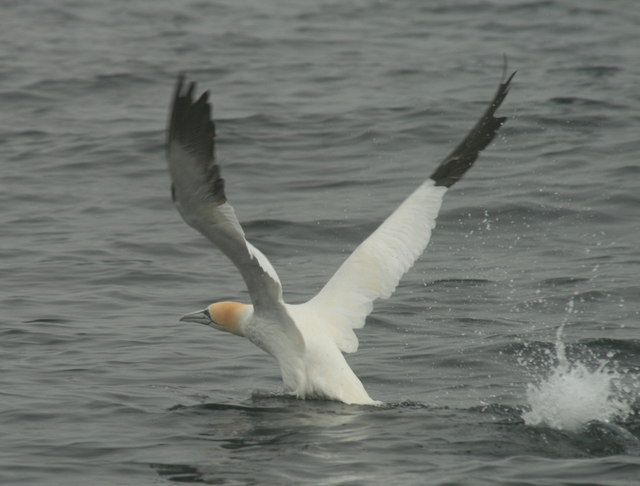
Gannets and other seabirds fuel themselves with mackerel

Mackerel are prolific broadcast spawners, and must breed near the surface of the water because the eggs of the females float. Individual females lay between 300,000 and 1,500,000 eggs. Their eggs and larvae are pelagic, that is, they float free in the open sea. The larvae and juvenile mackerel feed on zooplankton. As adults, they have sharp teeth, and hunt small crustaceans such as copepods, forage fish, shrimp, and squid. In turn, they are hunted by larger pelagic animals such as tuna, billfish, sea lions, sharks, and pelicans.

Off Madagascar, spinner sharks follow migrating schools of mackerel. Bryde's whales feed on mackerel when they can find them. They use several feeding methods, including skimming the surface, lunging, and bubble nets.

== Fisheries ==
Global capture of mackerel in tonnes reported by the FAO 1950–2009

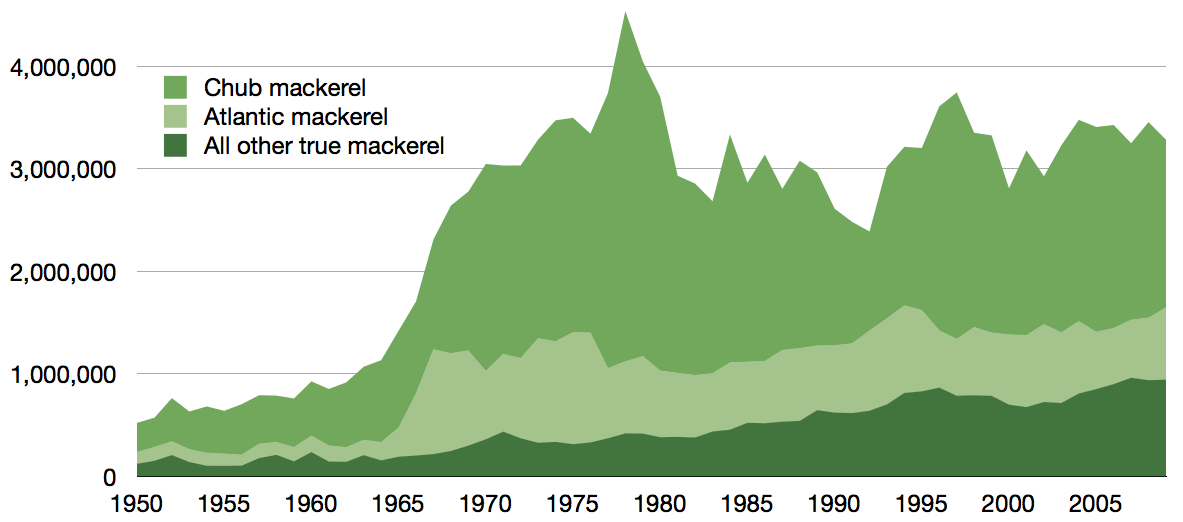
↑ Scombroid mackerels

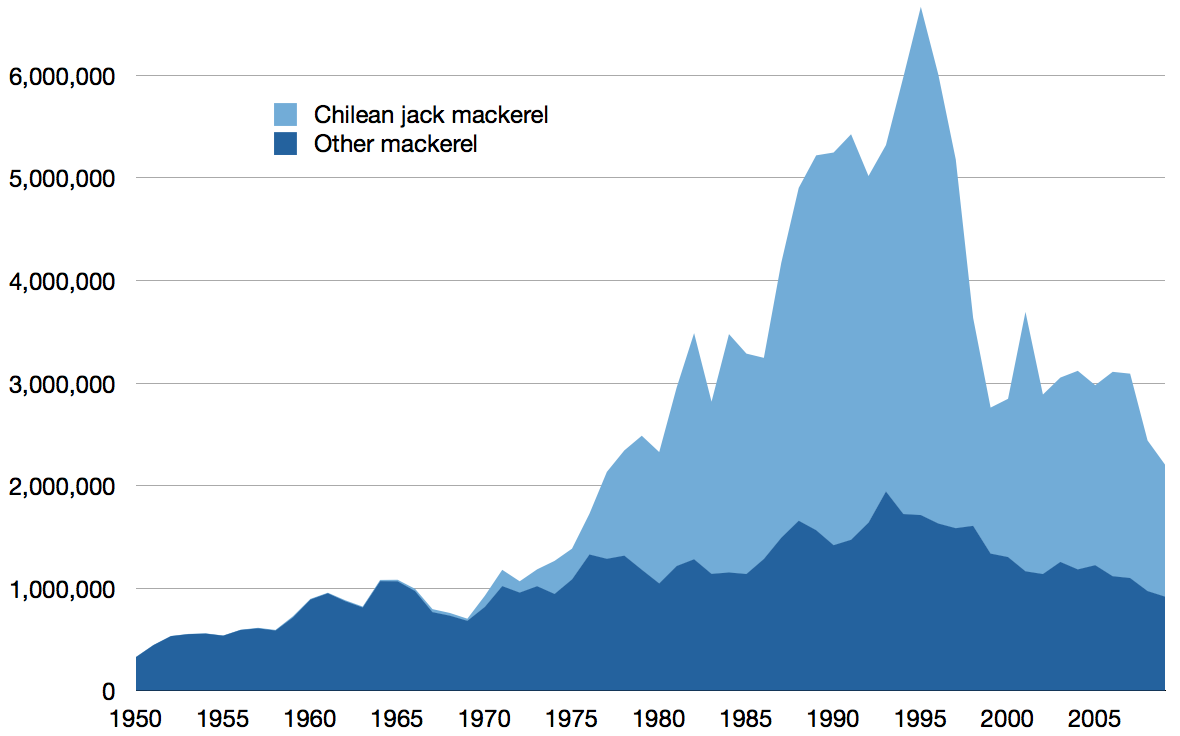
↑ Non-scombroid mackerels

Main commercial species

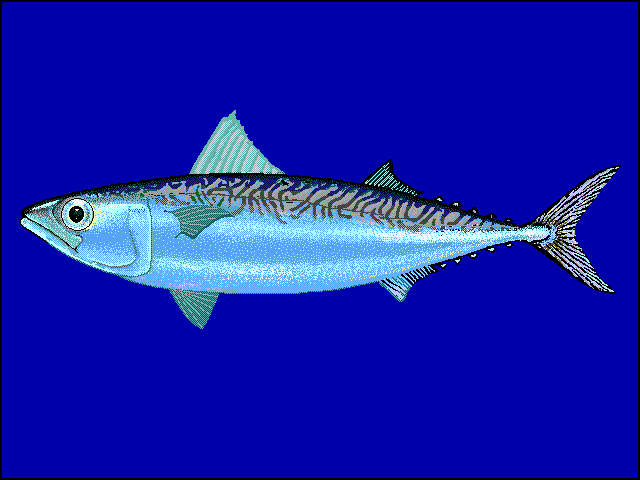
The chub mackerel is the most intensively fished mackerel in the scombroid family.

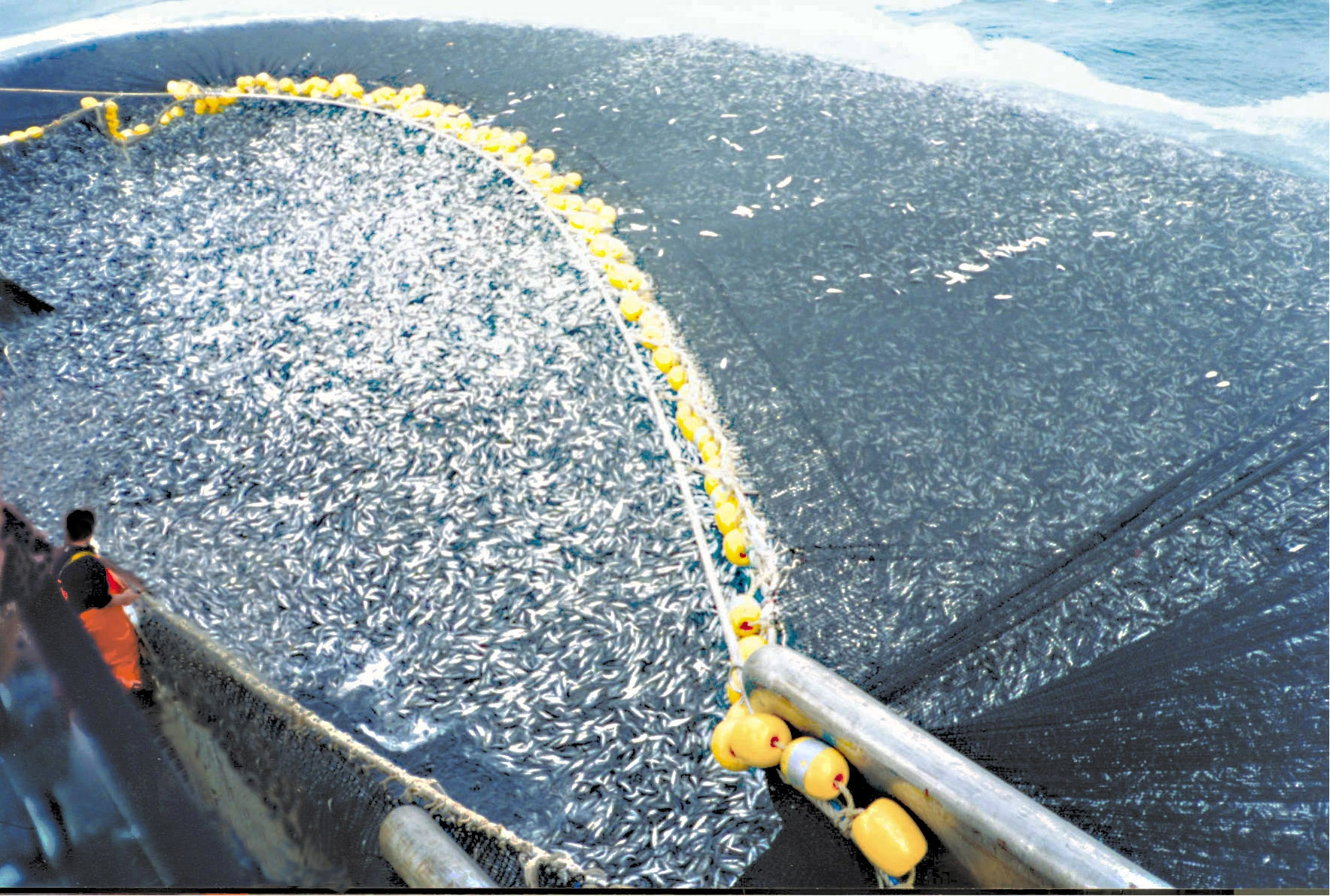
Chilean jack mackerel have been overfished and the population may be in danger of collapsing. Here an entire school of about 400 tons is encircled by a purse seiner.

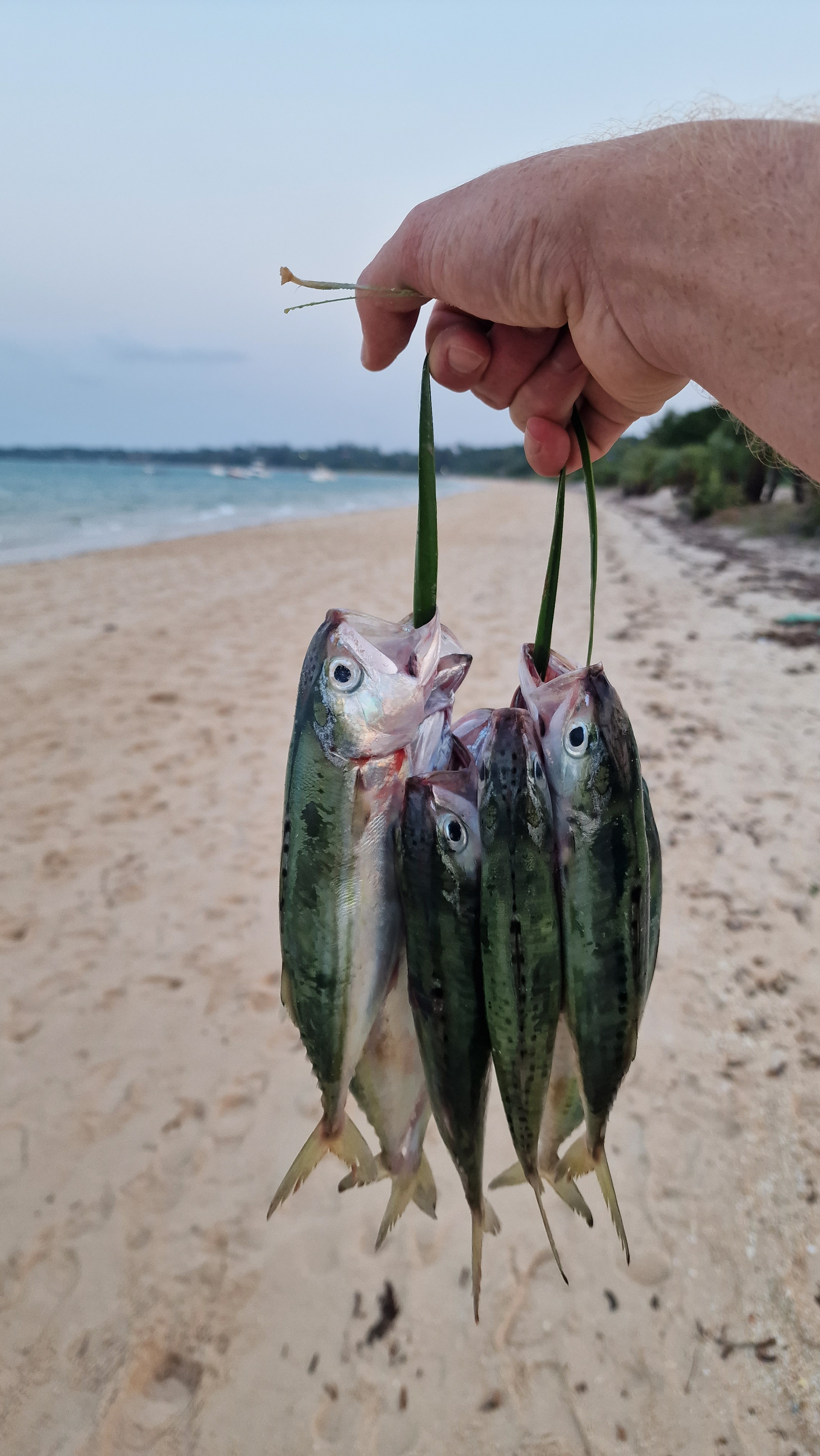
A fresh catch from an African beach

Chub mackerel, Scomber japonicus, are the most intensively fished scombroid mackerel. They account for about half the total capture production of scombroid mackerels. As a species, they are easily confused with Atlantic mackerel. Chub mackerel migrate long distances in oceans and across the Mediterranean. They can be caught with drift nets and suitable trawls, but are most usually caught with surround nets at night by attracting them with lampara lamps.

The remaining catch of scombroid mackerels is divided equally between the Atlantic mackerel and all other scombroid mackerels. Just these two species (Chub mackerel and Atlantic mackerel) account for about 75% of the total catch of scombroid mackerels.

Chilean jack mackerel are the most commonly fished non-scombroid mackerel, fished as heavily as chub mackerel. The species has been overfished, and its fishery may now be in danger of collapsing.

Smaller mackerel behave like herrings, and are captured in similar ways. Fish species like these, which school near the surface, can be caught efficiently by purse seining. Huge purse-seine vessels use spotter planes to locate the schooling fish. Then they close in using sophisticated sonar to track the shape of the school, which is then encircled with fast auxiliary boats that deploy purse seines as they speed around the school.

Suitably designed trollers can also catch mackerels effectively when they swim near the surface. Trollers typically have several long booms which they lift and drop with "topping lifts". They haul their lines with electric or hydraulic reels. Fish aggregating devices are also used to target mackerel.

Images and videos
Longlining for mackerel Narrow-barred Spanish mackerel, largest of the scombroid mackerels and a fine game fish for sport fishermen

== Management and conservation ==
The North Sea has been overfished to the point where the ecological balance has become disrupted and many jobs in the fishing industry have been lost.

The Southeast US region spans the Gulf of Mexico, the Caribbean Sea, and the US Southeast Atlantic. Overfishing of king and Spanish mackerel occurred in the 1980s. Regulations were introduced to restrict the size, fishing locations, and bag limits for recreational fishers and commercial fishers. Gillnets were banned in waters off Florida. By 2001, the mackerel stocks had recovered.

== As food ==
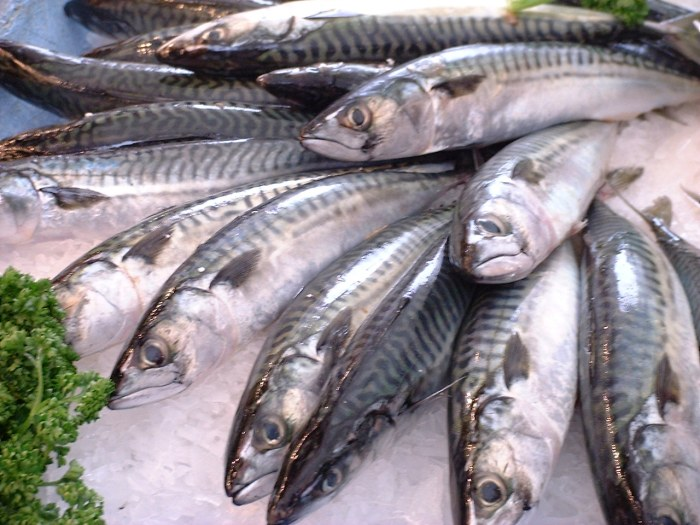
Atlantic mackerel on ice at a fish store

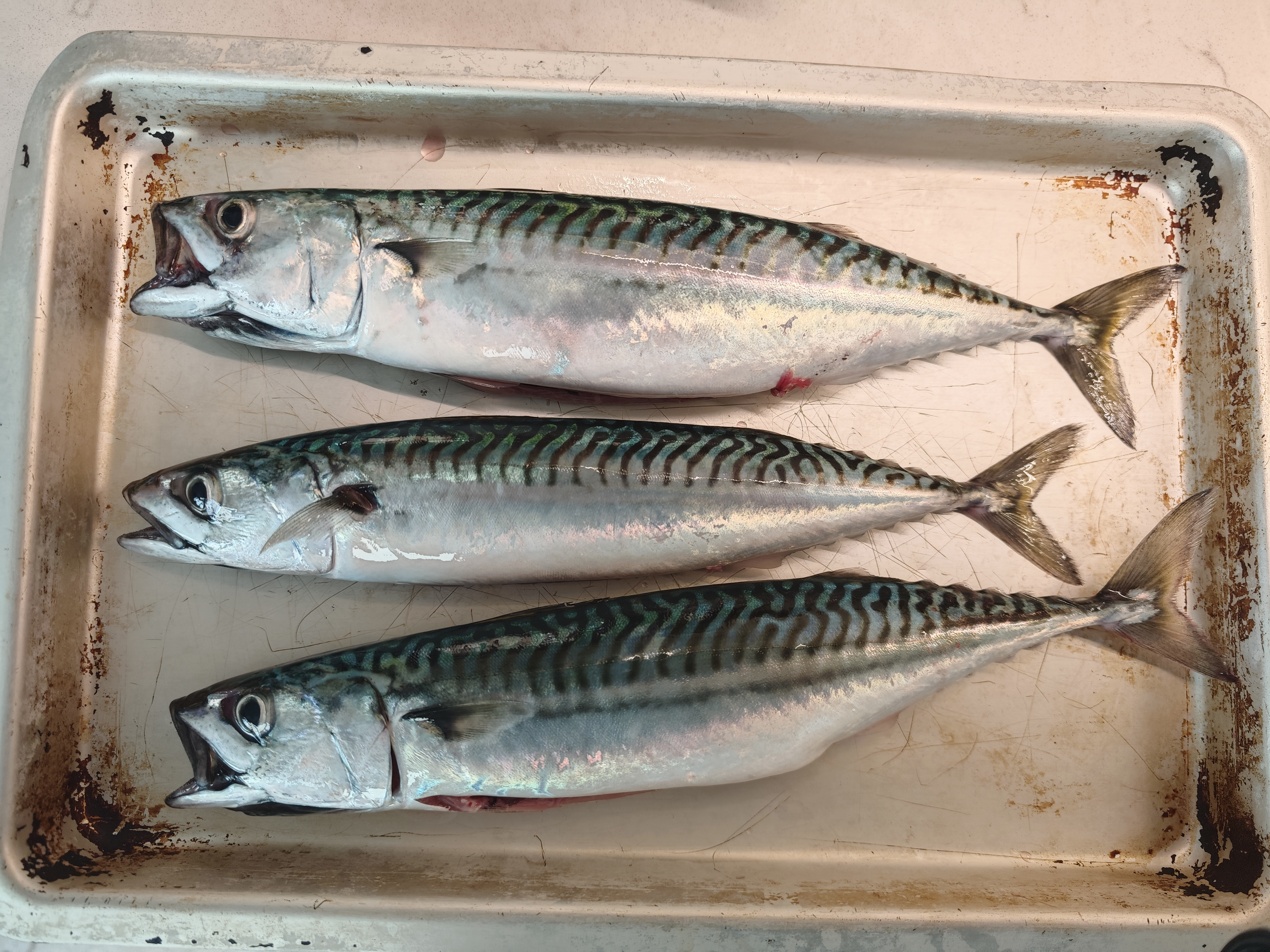
Three freshly caught and gutted mackerel from Mount's Bay in Cornwall

Mackerel is an important food fish that is consumed worldwide. As an oily fish, it is a rich source of omega-3 fatty acids. The flesh of mackerel spoils quickly, especially in the tropics, and can cause scombroid food poisoning. Accordingly, it should be eaten on the day of capture, unless properly refrigerated or cured.

Mackerel preservation is not simple. Before the 19th-century development of canning and the widespread availability of refrigeration, salting and smoking were the principal preservation methods available. Historically in England, this fish was not preserved, but was consumed only in its fresh form. However, spoilage was common, leading the authors of The Cambridge Economic History of Europe to remark: "There are more references to stinking mackerel in English literature than to any other fish!" In France, mackerel was traditionally pickled with large amounts of salt, which allowed it to be sold widely across the country.

For many years mackerel was regarded as 'unclean' in the UK and other places due to folklore which suggested that the fish fed on the corpses of dead sailors. A 1976 survey of housewives in Britain undertaken by the White Fish Authority indicated a reluctance to departing from buying the traditional staples of cod, haddock or salmon. Less than 10% of the survey's 1,931 respondents had ever bought mackerel, and only 3% did so regularly. As a result of this trend, many UK fishmongers during the 1970s did not display or even stock mackerel.
