= Eothyrsites =

Eothyrsites Temporal range: mid-late Eocene

Scientific classification
- Domain: Eukaryota
- Kingdom: Animalia
- Phylum: Chordata
- Class: Actinopterygii
- Order: Scombriformes
- Family: Gempylidae
- Genus: †Eothyrsites; Chapman, 1934
- Species: †E. holosquamatus

Binomial name
- †Eothyrsites holosquamatus Chapman, 1934

Extinct genus of fishes

Eothyrsites ("dawn Thyrsites") is an extinct genus of prehistoric snake mackerel from the Eocene. It contains a single species, E. holosquamatus from the mid-late Eocene (late Bartonian or early Priabonian)-aged Burside Mudstone Formation of the South Island, New Zealand.

It is one of the few Eocene-aged marine fishes from New Zealand known from a relatively complete skeleton. It was described by Frederick Chapman on the basis of a partial skeleton, but other fragments have also been recovered from the same site, all of which likely belong to the same individual as the holotype. Analysis of the skeleton suggests that it is most closely related to the "gemfish"-type gempylids such as Rexea and Promethichthys.

Eothyrsites was likely an epipelagic predatory genus, similar to modern members of the group. Its presence in New Zealand during the Late Eocene suggests that the gempylids must have colonized the southern Pacific from their region of origin in the northern Tethys Ocean by this point.

== See also ==
- Prehistoric fish
- List of prehistoric bony fish
