= Gemfish =

The term gemfish can refer to different fishes in the family Gempylidae, including:

- Black gemfish (Nesiarchus nasutus)
- Silver gemfish (Rexea solandri)
