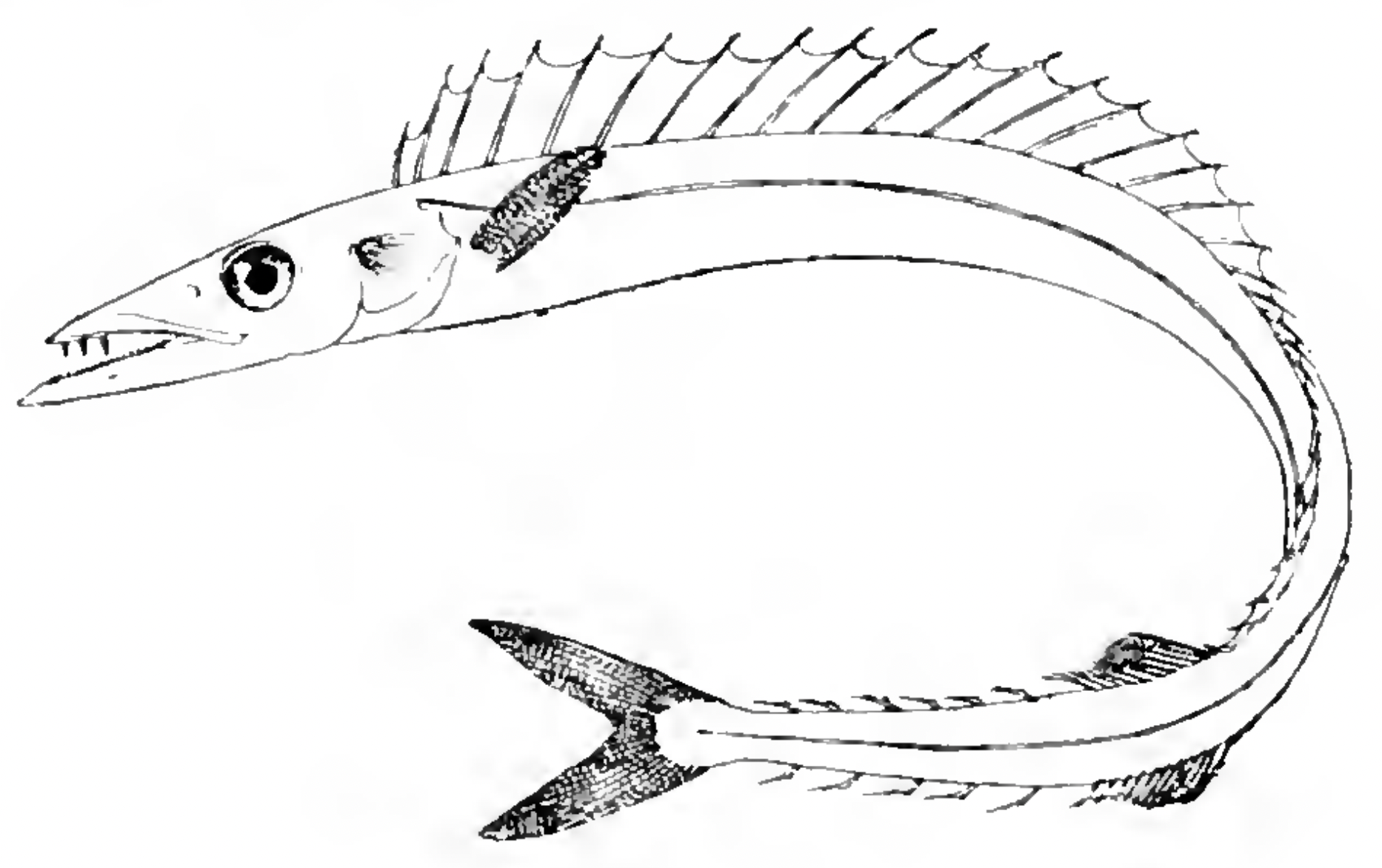
- Snake Mackerel, Gempylus serpens

Scientific classification
- Kingdom: Animalia
- Phylum: Chordata
- Class: Actinopterygii
- Division: Teleostei
- Order: Scombriformes
- Suborder: Scombroidei
- Family: Gempylidae; T. N. Gill, 1862

Genera
- Diplospinus; Epinnula; Gempylus; Leionura; Lepidocybium; Nealotus; Neoepinnula; Nesiarchus; Paradiplospinus; Promethichthys; Rexea; Rexichthys; Ruvettus; Thyrsites; Thyrsitoides; Tongaichthys

= Gempylidae =

Gempylidae Temporal range: Early Eocene to present

Family of ray-finned fishes

The Gempylidae are a family of scombriform ray-finned fishes commonly known as snake mackerels or escolars. The family includes about 25 species.

They are elongated fishes with a similar appearance to barracudas, having a long dorsal fin, usually with one or finlets trailing it. The largest species, including the snoek (Leionura atun), grow up to 2 m (6 ft 7 in) long, and the oilfish (Ruvettus pretiosus) can reach 3 m (9.8 ft), though they rarely surpass 150 cm (59 in). Like the barracudas, they are predators, with fang-like teeth.

== Taxonomy ==
- Subfamily Clade 1 Mthethwa, 2023
  - Genus Diplospinus
    - Diplospinus multistriatus Maul, 1948 (Striped escolar)
  - Genus Gempylus
    - Gempylus serpens G. Cuvier, 1829 (Snake mackerel)
  - Genus Nealotus
    - Nealotus tripes J. Y. Johnson, 1865 (Black Snake mackerel)
  - Genus Nesiarchus
    - Nesiarchus nasutus J. Y. Johnson, 1862 (Black gemfish)
  - Genus Paradiplospinus
    - Paradiplospinus antarcticus Andriashev, 1960 (Antarctic escolar)
    - Paradiplospinus gracilis (A. B. Brauer, 1906) (Slender escolar)
  - Genus Promethichthys
    - Promethichthys prometheus (G. Cuvier, 1832) (Roudi escolar)
  - Genus Rexea
    - Rexea alisae C. D. Roberts & A. L. Stewart, 1997
    - Rexea antefurcata Parin, 1989 (Long-finned escolar)
    - Rexea bengalensis (Alcock, 1894) (Bengal escolar)
    - Rexea brevilineata Parin, 1989 (Short-lined escolar)
    - Rexea nakamurai Parin, 1989 (Nakamura's escolar)
    - Rexea prometheoides (Bleeker, 1856) (Royal escolar)
    - Rexea solandri (G. Cuvier, 1832) (Silver gemfish)
  - Genus Rexichthys
    - Rexichthys johnpaxtoni Parin & Astakhov, 1987 (Paxton's escolar)
  - Genus Leionura
    - Leionura atun (Euphrasén, 1791) (Snoek)
  - Genus Thyrsites
    - Thyrsites lepidopodea (Lesson, 1831) (White snake mackerel))
  - Genus Thyrsitoides
    - Thyrsitoides marleyi Fowler, 1929 (Blacksail snake mackerel)
    - †Thyrsitoides zarahoustrae Arambourg, 1967
    - †Thyrsitoides cangrandei Calzoni, Giusberti & Carnevale, 2026
  - Genus Tongaichthys
    - Tongaichthys robustus I. Nakamura & E. Fujii, 1983 (Tonga escolar)
- Subfamily Clade 2 Mthethwa, 2023
  - Genus Epinnula
    - Epinnula magistralis Poey, 1854
    - Epinnula pacifica Ho, Motomura, Hata & Jiang, 2017
  - Genus Lepidocybium
    - Lepidocybium flavobrunneum (A. Smith, 1843) (Escolar)
  - Genus Neoepinnula
    - Neoepinnula americana (M. G. Grey, 1953) (American sackfish)
    - Neoepinnula minetomai Nakayama, Y. Kimura & Endo, 2014 (Large-eyed sackfish)
    - Neoepinnula orientalis (Gilchrist & von Bonde, 1924) (Sackfish)
  - Genus Ruvettus
    - Ruvettus pretiosus Cocco, 1833 (Oilfish)

The Gempylidae are broadly categorized into two clades; Clade 1, which includes more derived & elongate genera, and Clade 2, which includes more basal & fusiform genera. The Trichiuridae are an outgroup.

- Scombroidei
  - - Trichiuridae
  - Gempylidae
    - Clade 2
      - Lepidocybium
      - - Ruvettus
        - - Epinnula
          - - Neoepinnula
    - Clade 1
      - Nesiarchus
      - - - Gempylus
          - Thyrsitoides
        - - Rexea
          - - Thyrsites
            - - - Paradiplospinus
                - Diplospinus
              - - Nealotus
                - Promethichthys

Gempylidae are believed to have first evolved at least 20 million years after the Late Cretaceus Extinction event, potentially due to tectonic plate movements.

=== Fossil genera ===
The following fossil genera are known:

- †Abadzekhia Bannikov, 1985 (Early Oligocene of North Caucasus, Russia and Germany)
- †Contemptor Calzoni, Giusberti & Carnevale, 2026 (Early Eocene of northern Italy)
- †Chelifichthys Carnevale, 2006 (Late Miocene (Messinian) of Algeria)
- †Eothyrsites Chapman, 1934 (mid-late Eocene of New Zealand)
- †Hemithyrsites Daniltshenko, 1960 (Oligocene of Poland & Romania)
- †Krampusichthys Calzoni, Giusberti & Carnevale, 2025 (Early Eocene of Italy)
- †Laurinichthys Calzoni, Giusberti & Carnevale, 2025 (Early Eocene of Italy)
- †Progempylus Casier, 1966 (Early Eocene of England)
- †Thyrsitocephalus vom Rath, 1859 (Early Oligocene of Switzerland)
- †Wudelenia Calzoni, Giusberti & Carnevale, 2025 (Early Eocene of Italy)

== See also ==
- Euzaphlegidae, an extinct group of relatives from Paleocene to Late Miocene-aged marine strata of Europe, the Caucasus Mountains, India, Iran, Turkmenistan, Italy, and Southern California.
