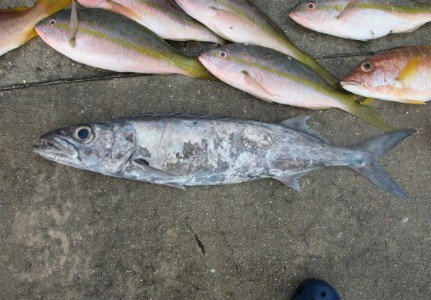

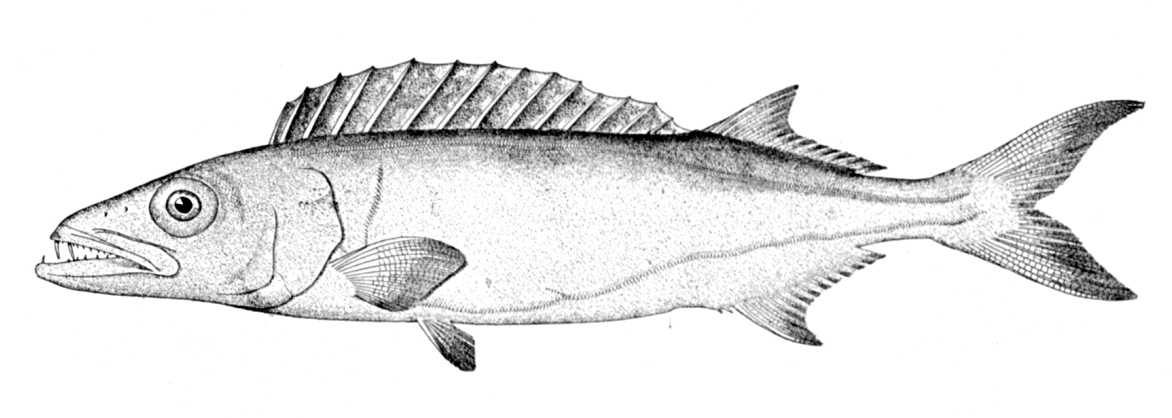

Conservation status
- Least Concern (IUCN 3.1)

Scientific classification
- Kingdom: Animalia
- Phylum: Chordata
- Class: Actinopterygii
- Order: Scombriformes
- Family: Gempylidae
- Genus: Epinnula
- Species: E. magistralis

Binomial name
- Epinnula magistralis Poey, 1854

= Domine (fish) =

Species of fish

The Domine (Epinnula magistralis) is a tropical species of snake mackerel found in all oceans at depths of from 176 to 488 metres (577 to 1,601 ft). The largest specimen collected reached a meter in length, though few exceed 45 centimetres (18 in).

== Description ==
The Domine is identified by its deep, yet slender and compressed body, distinguishing it from other elongate snake mackerels. Its genus name, Epinnula, refers to its lack of finlets, unlike the related Oilfish. Its jaws are fanged, some of which remain exposed even when the mouth is closed. It is a pale, grey-blue color, which becomes darker from the head to the tail.

== Habitat & Ecology ==
The Domine has only been found in the Caribbean off the coast of Cuba, the Bahamas, and the Virgin Islands. It is likely mesopelagic, having been found at depths between 176 to 488 metres (577 to 1,601 ft).

== See also ==
- Epinnula pacifica
