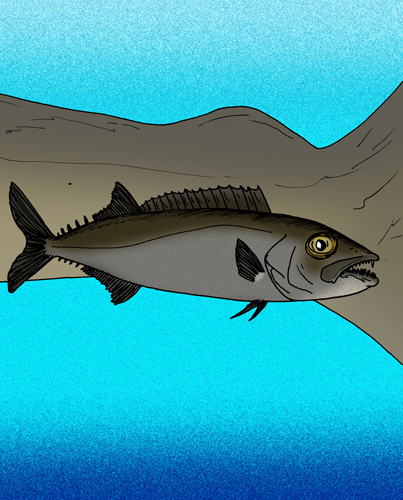
- Restoration of A. marinae

Scientific classification
- Kingdom: Animalia
- Phylum: Chordata
- Class: Actinopterygii
- Division: Teleostei
- Order: Scombriformes
- Family: Gempylidae
- Genus: †Abadzekhia; Bannikov, 1985

Type species
- Abadzekhia marinae Bannikov, 1985

Other species
- Abadzekhia tarletskovi Bannikov, 2005

= Abadzekhia =

Abadzekhia Temporal range: Early Oligocene

Extinct genus of fishes

Abadzekhia is an extinct genus of prehistoric snake mackerel that lived during the early Oligocene Epoch in what is now the North Caucasus of Southern Russia. Fossils of this genus have also been found in what is now Germany.

Abadzekhia contains two species: A. marinae is from an indeterminate locality in the North Caucasus of Russia as well as the Rauenberg fossil site of Germany, while A. tarletskovi has been found in the Pshekha Formation of the North Caucasus.

== See also ==
- Prehistoric fish
- List of prehistoric bony fish
