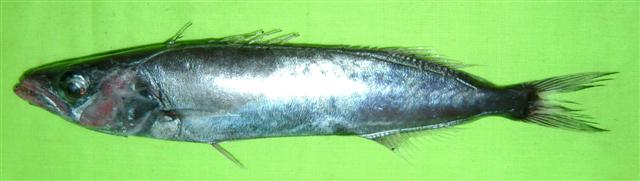

Scientific classification
- Kingdom: Animalia
- Phylum: Chordata
- Class: Actinopterygii
- Order: Scombriformes
- Family: Gempylidae
- Genus: Neoepinnula; Matsubara & Iwai, 1952

Type species
- Epinnula orientalis Gilchrist & von Bonde, 1924

= Neoepinnula =

Genus of fishes

Neoepinnula is a genus of snake mackerels, also known as sackfish.

== Species ==
There are currently 3 recognized species in this genus:

- Neoepinnula americana (M. G. Grey, 1953) (American sackfish)
- Neoepinnula minetomai Nakayama, Y. Kimura & Endo, 2014 (Large-eyed sackfish)
- Neoepinnula orientalis (Gilchrist & von Bonde, 1924) (Sackfish)
