= Progempylus =

Progempylus Temporal range: Lower Eocene

Scientific classification
- Kingdom: Animalia
- Phylum: Chordata
- Class: Actinopterygii
- Division: Teleostei
- Order: Scombriformes
- Family: Gempylidae
- Genus: †Progempylus; Casier, 1966

Progempylus is an extinct genus of prehistoric snake mackerel that lived during the lower Eocene.

== See also ==
- Prehistoric fish
- List of prehistoric bony fish
