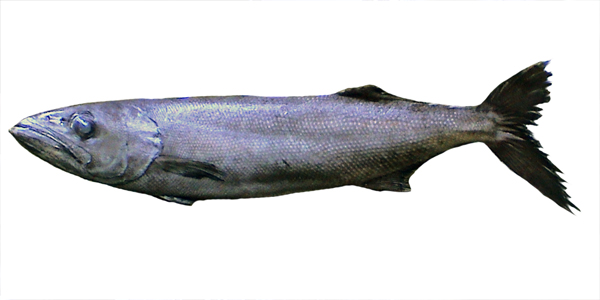

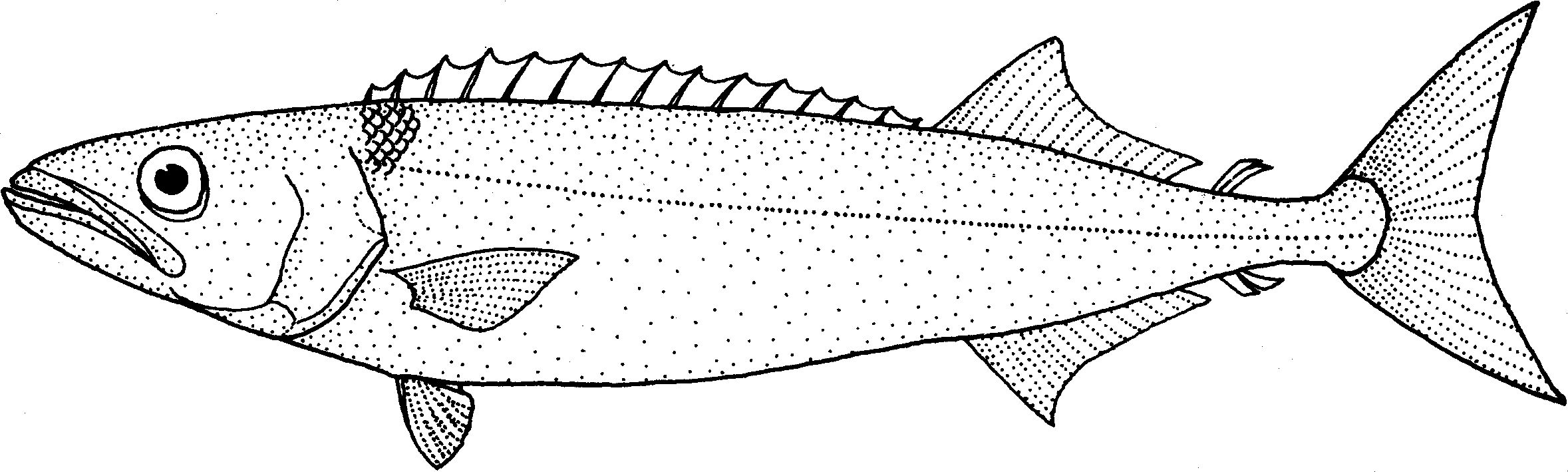

Conservation status
- Least Concern (IUCN 3.1)

Scientific classification
- Kingdom: Animalia
- Phylum: Chordata
- Class: Actinopterygii
- Division: Teleostei
- Order: Scombriformes
- Family: Gempylidae
- Genus: Ruvettus; Cocco, 1833
- Species: R. pretiosus

Binomial name
- Ruvettus pretiosus Cocco, 1833

Synonyms
- List: Rovetus temminckii Cantraine, 1833; Tetragonurus simplex R. T. Lowe, 1839; Thyrsites acanthoderma R. T. Lowe, 1839; Thyrsites scholaris Poey, 1854; Ruvettus tydemani M. C. W. Weber, 1913; Ruvettus pacificus D. S. Jordan & E. K. Jordan, 1922; Ruvettus delagoensis Gilchrist & von Bonde, 1924; Ruvettus whakari Griffin, 1927

= Oilfish =

Species of fish

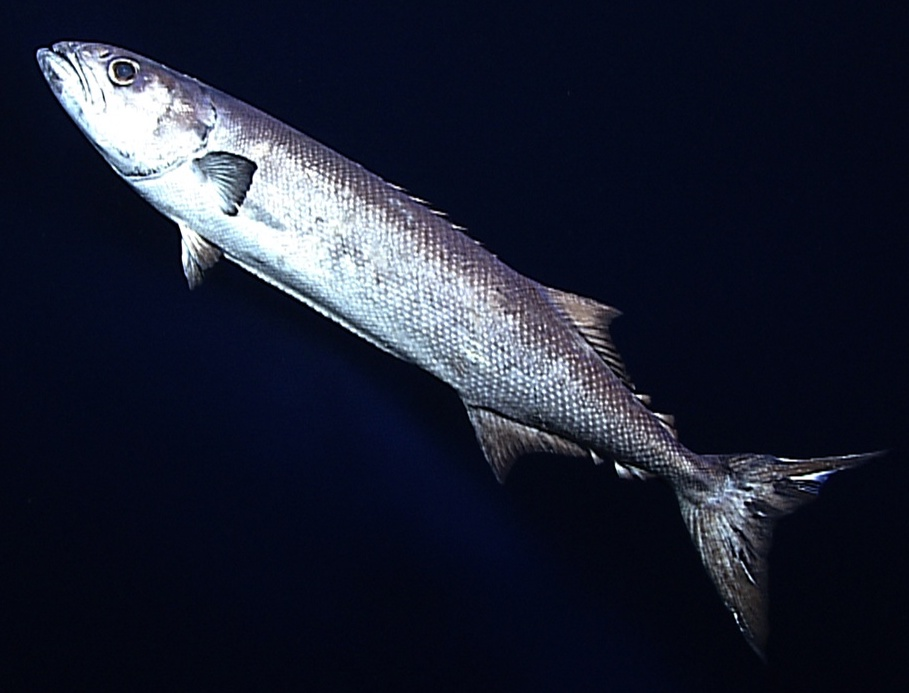
An oilfish 1000–3000 meters deep at Johnston Atoll

Oilfish (Ruvettus pretiosus) are a species of snake mackerel with a cosmopolitan distribution in tropical and temperate oceans. They can be found at depths from 100 to 800 metres (330 to 2,620 ft), but most often between 200 and 400 metres (660 and 1,310 ft). Oilfish can grow to a length of 3 metres (9.8 ft), though most do not exceed 1.5 metres (4.9 ft). It is the only known member of its genus.

== Description ==
Oilfish are large, fusiform fish which often grow to 1.5 metres (4.9 ft) and a maximum of 3 metres (9.8 ft). Other distinctive features of this fish include the large fangs, rough scales, two pairs of finlets, and a uniformly brown coloration. Oilfish meat is extremely oily, containing high lipid concentrations. Though edible, the oil mainly consists of wax esters, which makes the meat act as a laxative if consumed in large quantities.

== Habitat and ecology ==
Oilfish are distributed throughout tropical and temperate waters across the world, being recorded in the Atlantic, Indian, and Pacific oceans, including the Mediterranean Sea. They are found in the deep water benthic environments of continental slopes and seamounts, where they group in pairs or remain solitary. If food is scarce on the seafloor, at night oilfish will rise to the surface to prey on other fish, cephalopods, and crustaceans.

== Human use ==
Fisheries targeting oilfish are rare, occurring in small regions of the Atlantic and Pacific through the use of handlines. However, oilfish are common bycatch for fisheries targeting tuna and swordfish, which employ longlines. Despite their laxative flesh, restaurants sell oilfish meat under the name "white-fish" on account of its texture and flavor.

The flesh of oilfish is rich in taste and can be substantially cheaper than that of other fish species, leading to some vendors intentionally mislabelling it as butterfish or cod. The consumer may then eat larger servings than recommended, unaware of the laxative effect, and suffer from diarrhea.

In Cabo Verde, oilfish is occasionally caught and sold to fishmongers at port, who trade among each other or sell to consumers who request it. While rarely sold at market due to its laxative effects, oilfish is well known among fishmongers and fishermen, and goes by the name xoba in Praia and Cagazeite, which means "shit out oil" in São Vicente.

=== ParknShop oilfish incident ===
In January 2007, ParknShop, a supermarket chain in Hong Kong, admitted to selling mislabeled oilfish in their stores. Over 600 people became sick as a result, suffering from stomach pain and diarrhea. A total of 14 complaints were filed against the supermarket chain, leading to an investigation by the Centre for Food Safety. The fish were originally mislabeled in Indonesia, leading to an investigation and allegations of corruption. ParknShop stopped selling the fish, but argued in court that there was no law against the sale of oilfish. The supermarket would later plead guilty to nine charges of inappropriate labelling, and was fined HK$45,000.

As a result of the incident, the Centre for Food Safety in Hong Kong published new guidelines on the proper labelling of oilfish and escolar to consumers, preventing mislabeling.

The Canadian Broadcasting Corporation in 2007 reported several cases in Canada where mislabelled oilfish was sold at Chinese supermarkets.

== See also ==
- Escolar, an oilfish relative, also has high concentrations of wax esters and can be similarly mislabeled.
