= Tongaichthys =

Scientific classification
- Kingdom: Animalia
- Phylum: Chordata
- Class: Actinopterygii
- Division: Teleostei
- Order: Scombriformes
- Family: Gempylidae
- Genus: Tongaichthys; I. Nakamura & E. Fujii, 1983
- Species: T. robustus

Binomial name
- Tongaichthys robustus I. Nakamura & E. Fujii, 1983

Species of fish

Tongaichthys robustus, the Tonga escolar, is a species of snake mackerel known from the Tonga Ridge near Fiji and off of Queensland, Australia from Flinders Reef. It is known to occur at depths of from 288 to 312 metres (945 to 1,024 ft). This species grows to a length of 30 centimetres (12 in) SL. This species is the only known member of its genus.
