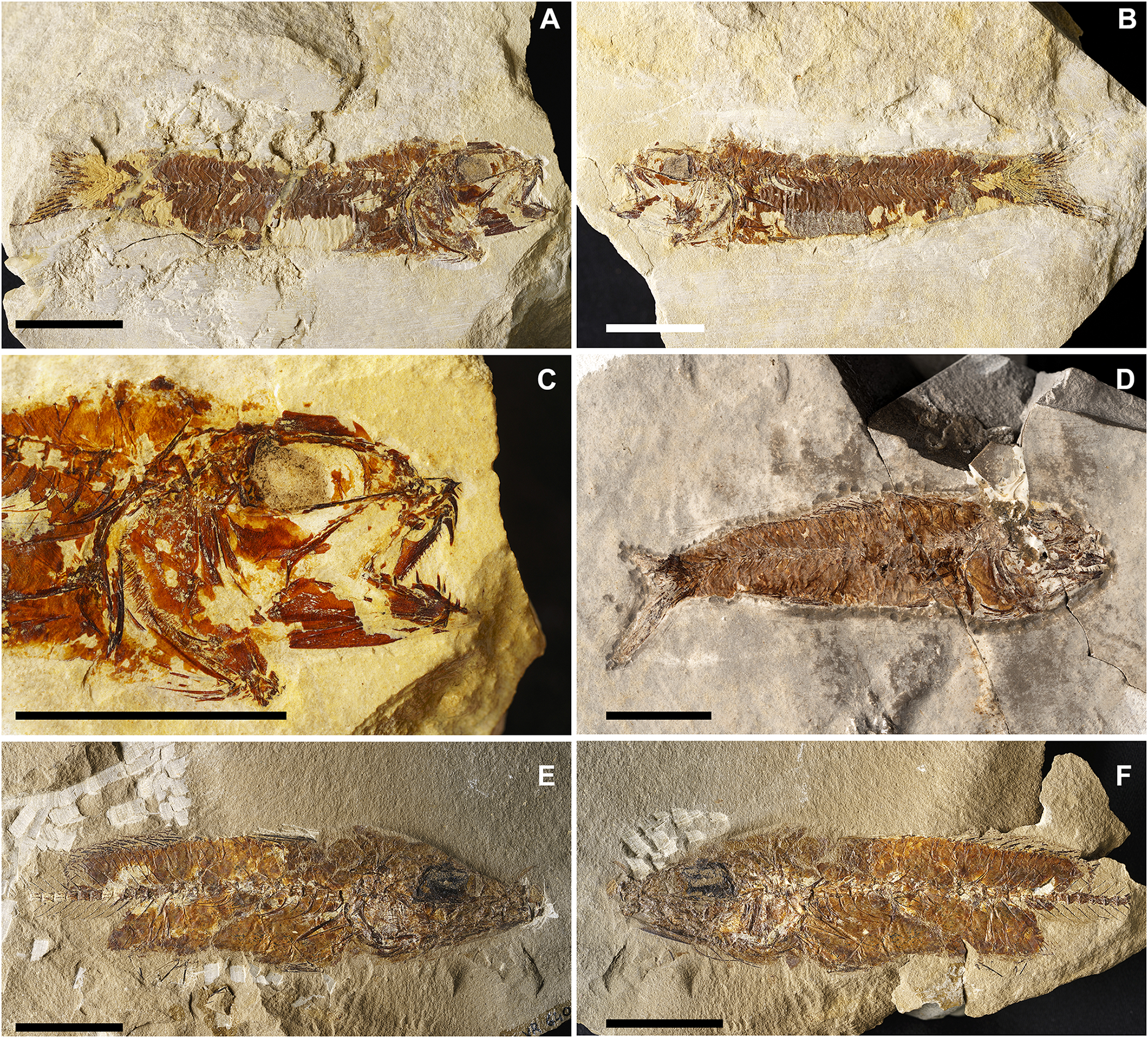
- Three fossil specimens of C. mastinoi

Scientific classification
- Kingdom: Animalia
- Phylum: Chordata
- Class: Actinopterygii
- Division: Teleostei
- Order: Scombriformes
- Family: Gempylidae
- Genus: †Contemptor; Calzoni, Giusberti & Carnevale, 2026
- Species: †C. mastinoi

Binomial name
- †Contemptor mastinoi Calzoni, Giusberti & Carnevale, 2026

= Contemptor =

Contemptor Temporal range: Eocene (Ypresian), 56–48.07 Ma

Extinct genus of scombrid fish

Contemptor is an extinct genus of scombrid fish that belongs to the family Gempylidae (snake mackerels). It is known from the Eocene (Ypresian age) of northern Italy. The genus contains one species, Contemptor mastinoi.

Like all gempylids, it has an elongated and slightly compressed fusiform body shape. It has small conical teeth. It had a length of around 81.5–84.4 mm.

== Discovery and naming ==
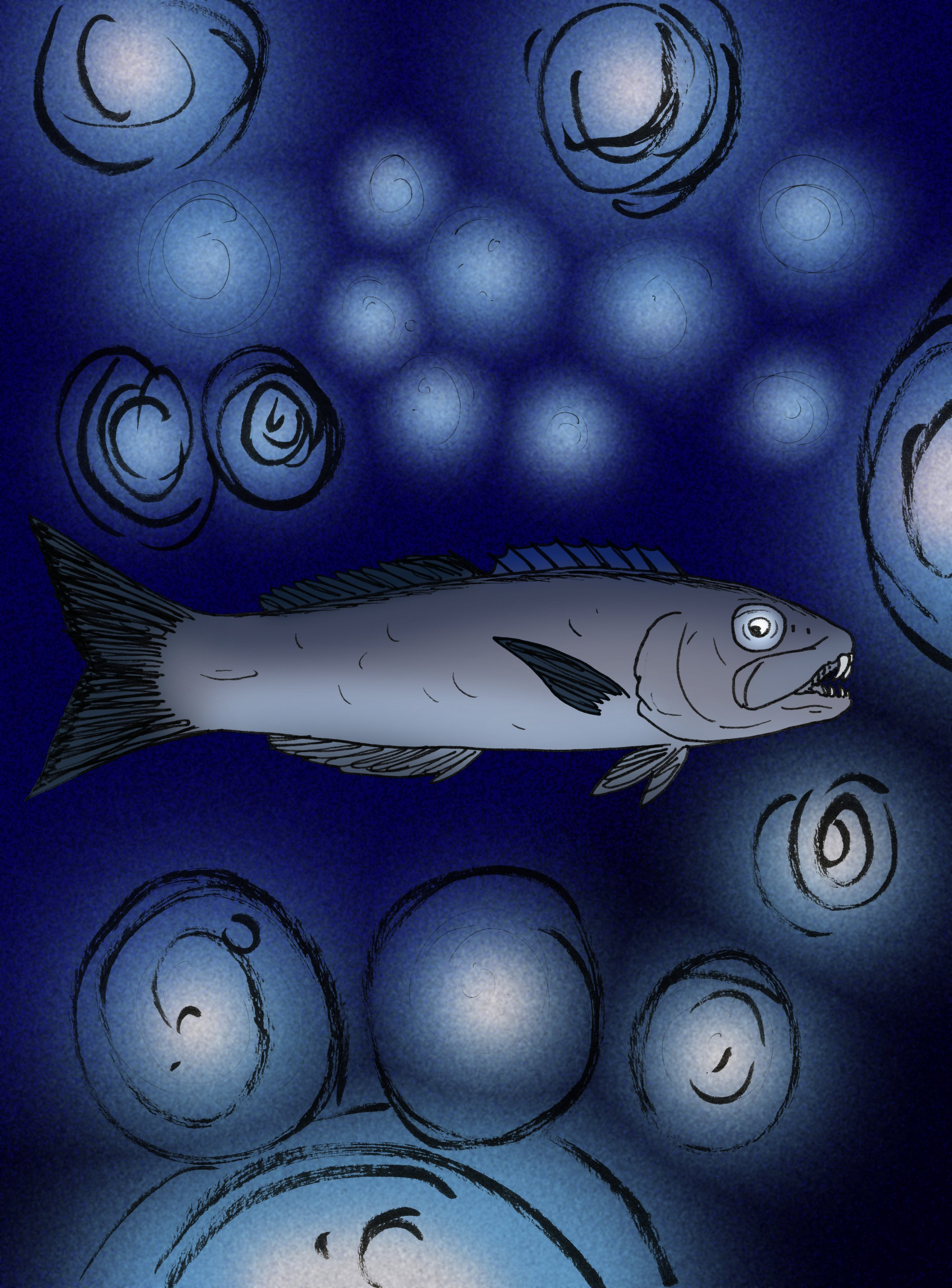
Life restoration

The holotype (IGVR 82435–82436) of this genus was discovered in the Marly limestones of the Chiusole Formation in the Monte Solane mountains, near Verona, Italy. A paratype (IGVR 67858), which is nearly complete, was also found. The holotype consists of a nearly complete articulated skeleton.

The generic name "Contemptor" is a Latin word meaning "contemptuous", in reference to the fierce appearance of this genus, according to the describers. The specific name honors Mastino della Scala, a Master of the city of Verona, Italy from 1262 to 1277. It is also in reference to the Italian word "mastino" which means "mastiff", due to the large fangs of this species.
