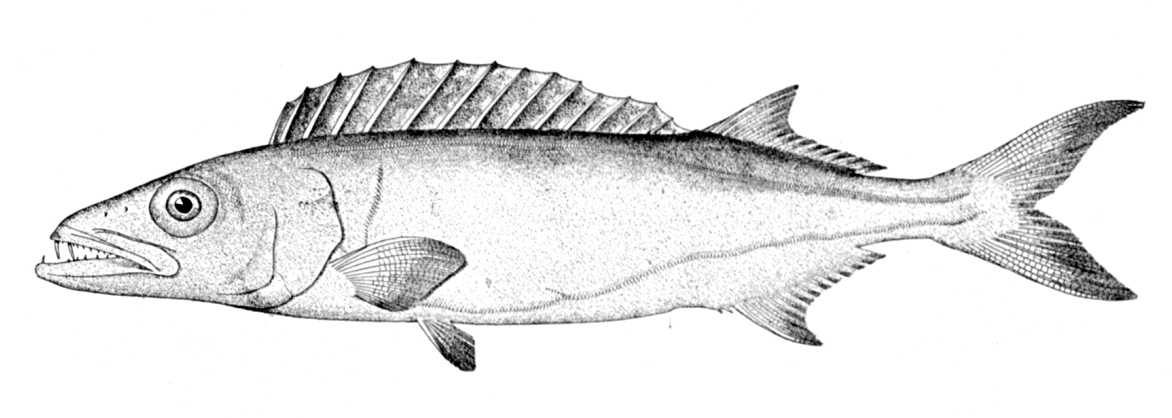
- Epinnula magistralis

Scientific classification
- Kingdom: Animalia
- Phylum: Chordata
- Class: Actinopterygii
- Order: Scombriformes
- Family: Gempylidae
- Genus: Epinnula; Poey, 1854

Species
- Epinnula magistralis Poey, 1854; Epinnula pacifica Ho, Motomura, Hata & Jiang, 2017

= Epinnula =

Genus of fish

Epinnula is a genus of fish in the family Gempylidae.

== Species ==
There are two recognized species in this genus. Epinnula magistralis is found in the Caribbean, while Epinnula pacifica is found in the West Pacific.

- Epinnula magistralis Poey, 1854 (Domine)
- Epinnula pacifica Ho, Motomura, Hata & Jiang, 2017
