= Rexichthys =

Scientific classification
- Kingdom: Animalia
- Phylum: Chordata
- Class: Actinopterygii
- Division: Teleostei
- Order: Scombriformes
- Family: Gempylidae
- Genus: Rexichthys; Parin & Astakhov, 1987
- Species: R. johnpaxtoni

Binomial name
- Rexichthys johnpaxtoni Parin & Astakhov, 1987

Species of fish

Rexichthys johnpaxtoni, the Paxton's escolar, is a species of snake mackerel found in the western Pacific Ocean from around Australia and New Caledonia where it is found at depths of from 270 to 470 metres (890 to 1,540 ft). This species grows to a length of 22 centimetres (8.7 in) SL. This species is the only known member of its genus, the specific name honours John R. Paxton, a curator of the collection of fishes of the Australian Museum in Sydney.
