= Diplospinus =

Conservation status
- Least Concern (IUCN 3.1)

Scientific classification
- Kingdom: Animalia
- Phylum: Chordata
- Class: Actinopterygii
- Order: Scombriformes
- Family: Gempylidae
- Genus: Diplospinus
- Species: D. multistriatus

Binomial name
- Diplospinus multistriatus Maul, 1948

Species of fish

Diplospinus multistriatus, the Striped escolar, is a species of snake mackerel of cosmopolitan distribution at depths of from 50 to 1,000 metres (160 to 3,280 ft). This species grows to a length of 33 centimetres (13 in) SL though most do not exceed 20 centimetres (7.9 in) SL. This species is important as a food fish to local populations. This species is the only known member of its genus.
