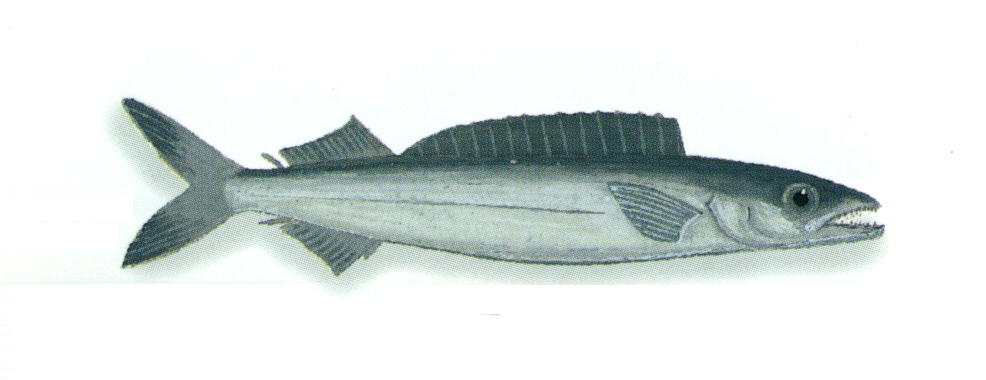

Conservation status
- Least Concern (IUCN 3.1)

Scientific classification
- Kingdom: Animalia
- Phylum: Chordata
- Class: Actinopterygii
- Order: Scombriformes
- Family: Gempylidae
- Genus: Promethichthys; T. N. Gill, 1893
- Species: P. prometheus

Binomial name
- Promethichthys prometheus (G. Cuvier, 1832)

Synonyms
- Gempylus prometheus G. Cuvier, 1832; Thyrsites prometheus (G. Cuvier, 1832); Prometheus atlanticus R. T. Lowe, 1838; Dicrotus armatus Günther, 1860; Thyrsites ballieui Sauvage, 1882; Dicrotus parvipinnis Goode & Bean, 1896; Promethichthys pacificus Seale, 1906; Promethichthys solandri Jordan, Evermann & S. Tanaka (I), 1927

= Promethichthys =

Species of fish

Promethichthys prometheus, the Roudi escolar, is a species of snake mackerel native to the warm temperate and tropical waters of all the oceans where it occurs at depths of from 80 to 800 metres (260 to 2,620 ft) (mostly between 300 and 400 metres (980 and 1,310 ft)). This species grows to a length of 100 centimetres (39 in) SL though most do not exceed 40 centimetres (16 in) SL. It is important to local peoples as a food fish and is popular as a game fish though it has been reported to carry the ciguatera toxin. It is also utilized as bait. This species is the only known member of its genus.

== See also ==
- Escolar
