= Paradiplospinus =

Scientific classification
- Domain: Eukaryota
- Kingdom: Animalia
- Phylum: Chordata
- Class: Actinopterygii
- Order: Scombriformes
- Family: Gempylidae
- Genus: Paradiplospinus; Andriashev, 1960

Type species
- Paradiplospinus antarcticus Andriashev, 1960

Genus of fishes

Paradiplospinus is a genus of snake mackerels native to the southern oceans.

== Species ==
There are currently two recognized species in this genus:

- Paradiplospinus antarcticus Andriashev, 1960 (Antarctic escolar)
- Paradiplospinus gracilis (A. B. Brauer, 1906) (Slender escolar)
