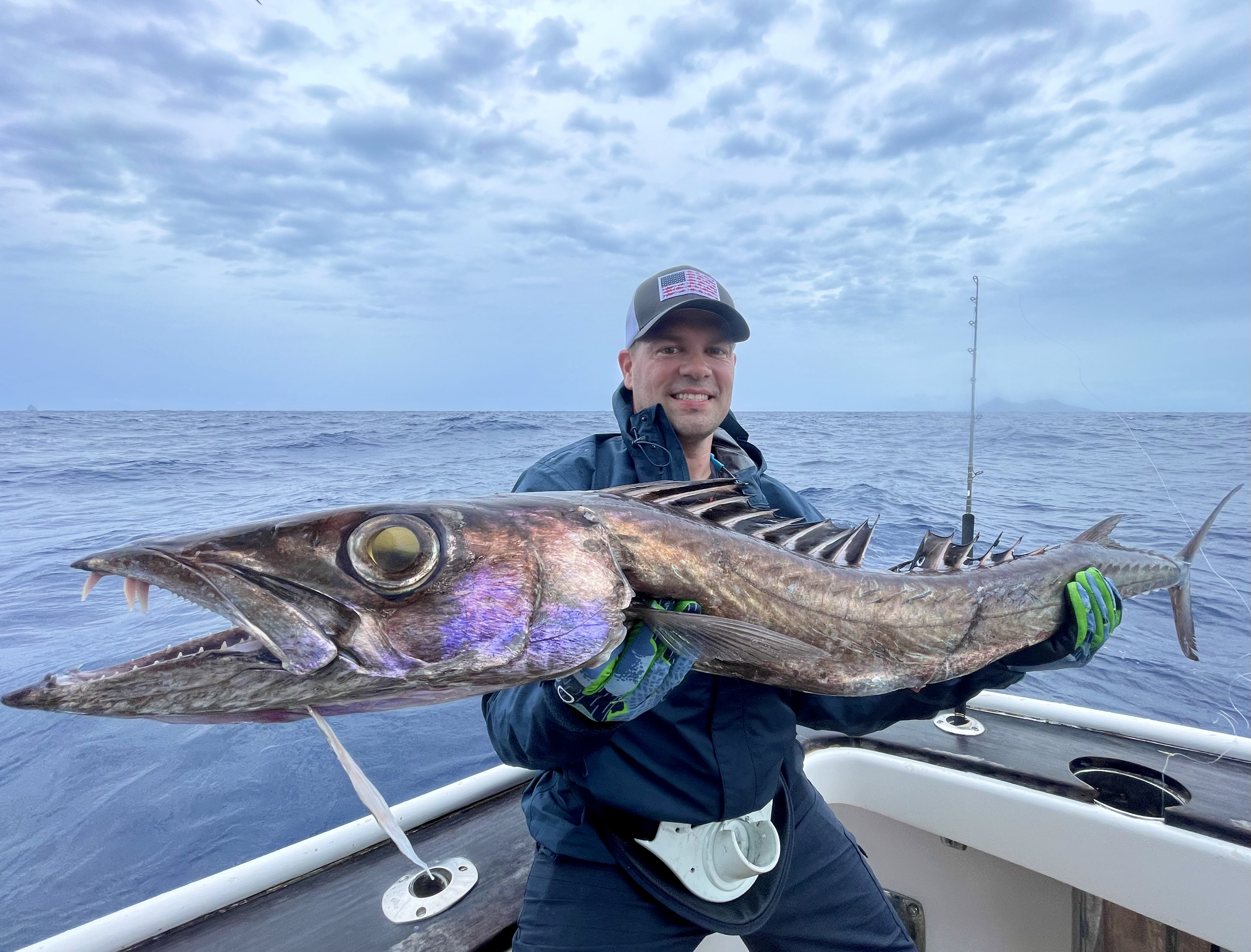
- Individual caught near Vanuatu

Scientific classification
- Kingdom: Animalia
- Phylum: Chordata
- Class: Actinopterygii
- Division: Teleostei
- Order: Scombriformes
- Family: Gempylidae
- Genus: Thyrsitoides
- Species: T. marleyi

Binomial name
- Thyrsitoides marleyi Fowler, 1929

Synonyms
- Mimasea taeniosoma Kamohara, 1936; Thyrsitoides jordanus Ajiad, Jafari & Mahasneh, 1987

= Blacksail snake mackerel =

Blacksail snake mackerel Temporal range: Early Eocene to present

Species of fish

The blacksail snake mackerel (Thyrsitoides marleyi), also known as the black snoek, is a species of snake mackerel found in the Indo-Pacific from shallow water to a depth of at least 400 m (1,300 ft) where they appear to prefer slopes on seamounts and ridges. They are known for making diel vertical migrations to near-surface waters at night, feeding on fish, squid and crustaceans. This species reaches a total length of 2 m (6.6 ft) though most are around 1 m (3.3 ft). This species is of minor importance to local commercial fisheries.

T. marleyi is the only extant (living) member of the genus Thyrsitoides. However, two extinct species are also known: T. zarahoustrae Arambourg, 1967 from the Late Eocene Pabdeh Formation of Iran and potentially the Early Oligocene of Romania, and T. cangrandei Calzoni, Giusberti & Carnevale, 2026 from the Early Eocene Chiusole Formation of Italy.

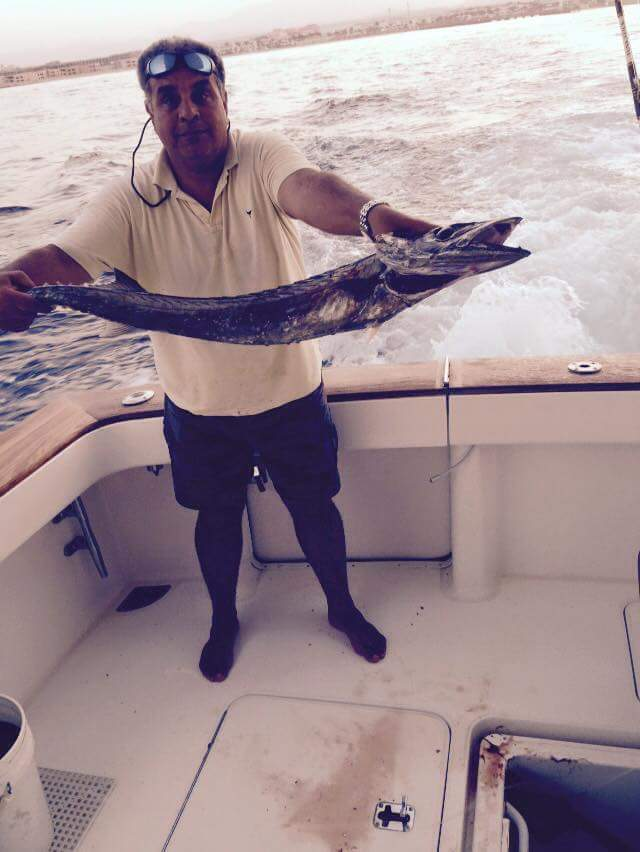
Individual caught near Hurghada, Egypt
