= Black snake mackerel =

Conservation status
- Least Concern (IUCN 3.1)

Scientific classification
- Kingdom: Animalia
- Phylum: Chordata
- Class: Actinopterygii
- Order: Scombriformes
- Family: Gempylidae
- Genus: Nealotus
- Species: N. tripes

Binomial name
- Nealotus tripes J. Y. Johnson, 1865

Synonyms
- Machaerope latispinis Ogilby, 1899; Machaerope latispinus Ogilby, 1899

Species of fish

The black snake mackerel (Nealotus tripes) is a species of snake mackerel found worldwide in both tropical and temperate waters where they are found at depths of from 914 to 1,646 metres (2,999 to 5,400 ft) making diel vertical migrations from mesopelagic depths to the surface at night. It can reach a length of 25 centimetres (9.8 in) SL though most do not exceed 15 centimetres (5.9 in) SL. It is important to local peoples as a food fish. This species is currently the only known member of its genus, Nealotus. That genus is therefore said to be monotypic.

== Parasites ==
As all fish, the black snake mackerel has a variety of parasites. A study performed on fish from the subtropical upwelling region off North-West-Africa indicated that they harbour Myxozoa, Digenea, Monogenea, Cestoda, Nematoda including two species of Anisakis, Acanthocephala, and Copepoda.
