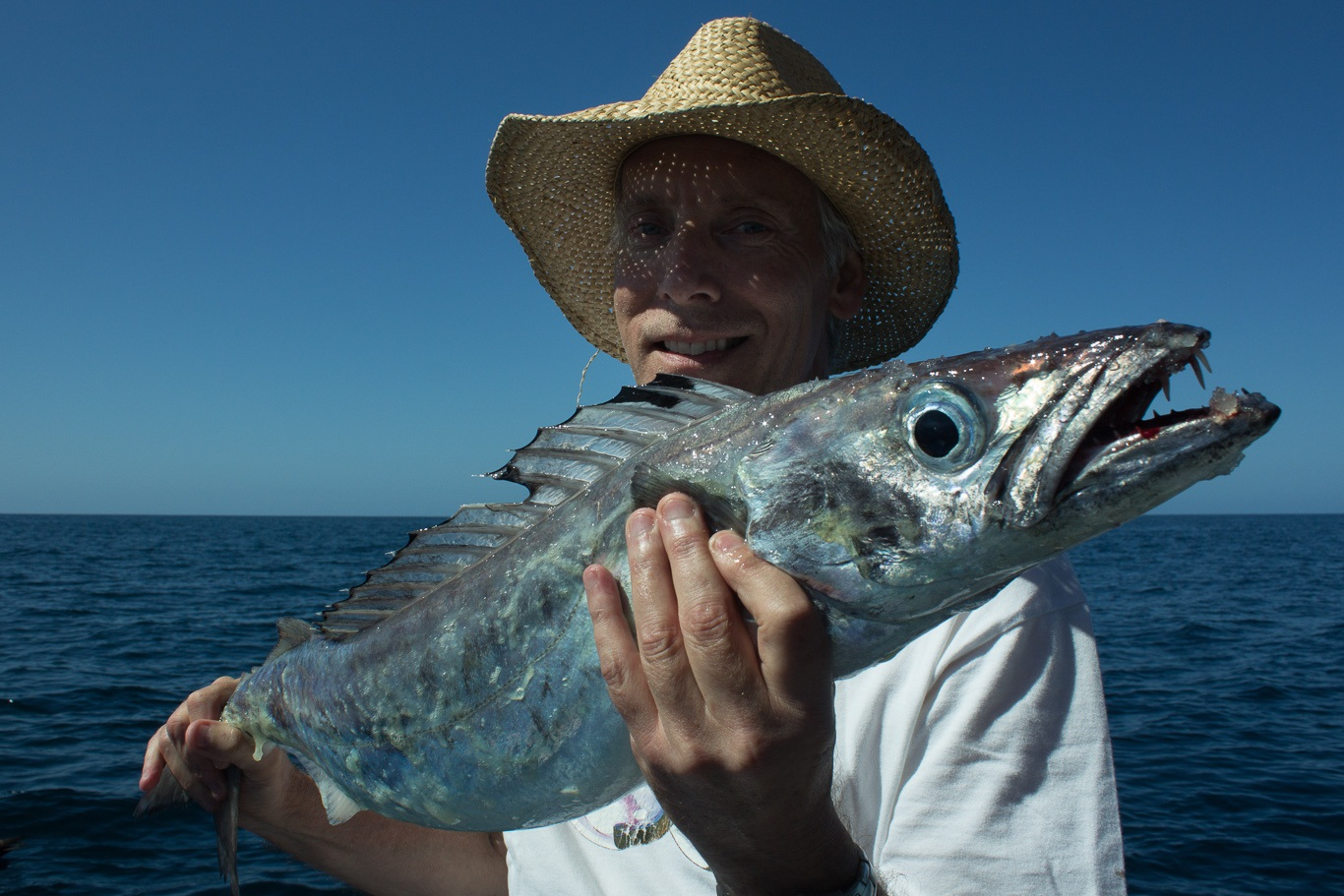

Scientific classification
- Kingdom: Animalia
- Phylum: Chordata
- Class: Actinopterygii
- Order: Scombriformes
- Family: Gempylidae
- Genus: Rexea
- Species: R. solandri

Binomial name
- Rexea solandri (G. Cuvier, 1832)

Synonyms
- Gempylus solandri G. Cuvier, 1832; Thyrsites micropus McCoy, 1873; Rexea furcifera Waite, 1911

= Silver gemfish =

Species of fish

Rexea solandri, the silver gemfish, is a species of snake mackerel found in the southwestern Pacific Ocean around Australia and New Zealand with reports of possible records from Madagascar and Japan. Gemfish appear as infrequent, but regular bycatch species in pelagic longline fisheries for tuna in the waters around the Hawaiian archipelago and American Samoa. This species occurs in schools at depths of between 100 and 800 metres (330 and 2,620 ft), though mostly between 300 and 450 metres (980 and 1,480 ft). This species can reach a length of up to 110 centimetres (43 in) SL and a maximum weight of 16 kilograms (35 lb) has been recorded. This species is important to local commercial fisheries.
