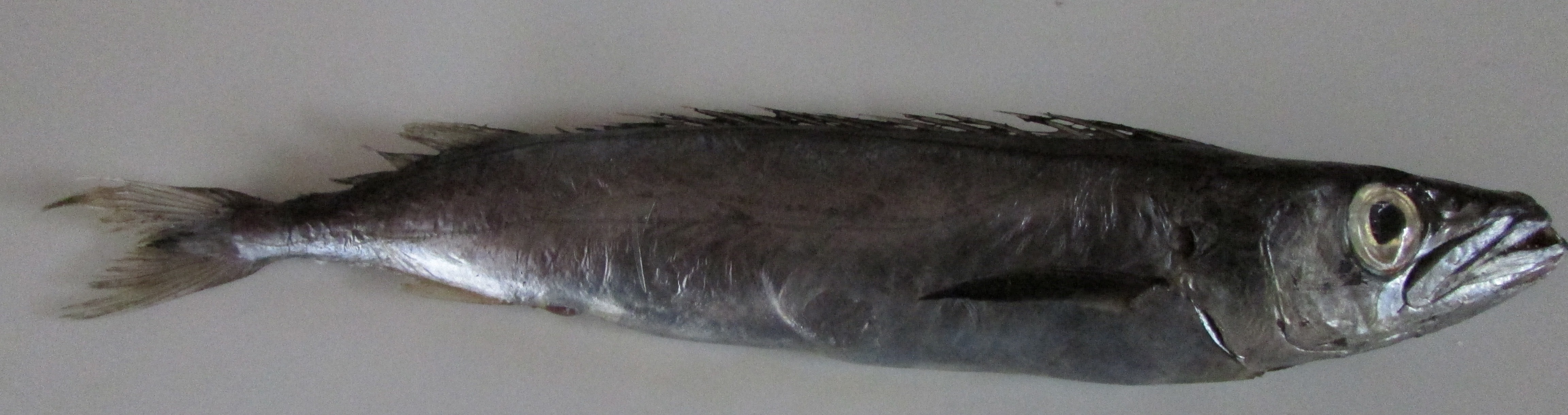
- Rexea bengalensis

Scientific classification
- Kingdom: Animalia
- Phylum: Chordata
- Class: Actinopterygii
- Order: Scombriformes
- Family: Gempylidae
- Genus: Rexea; Waite, 1911

Type species
- Rexea furcifera Waite, 1911

Synonyms
- Jordanidia Snyder, 1911

= Rexea =

Genus of fishes

Rexea is a genus of snake mackerels found in the Indian and Pacific oceans. It feeds on fishes, crustaceans and cephalopods.

== Species ==
There are currently seven recognized species in this genus:

- Rexea alisae C. D. Roberts & A. L. Stewart, 1997
- Rexea antefurcata Parin, 1989 (Long-finned escolar)
- Rexea bengalensis (Alcock, 1894) (Bengal escolar)
- Rexea brevilineata Parin, 1989 (Short-lined escolar)
- Rexea nakamurai Parin, 1989 (Nakamura's escolar)
- Rexea prometheoides (Bleeker, 1856) (Royal escolar)
- Rexea solandri (G. Cuvier, 1832) (Silver gemfish)
