= Anguilliformity =

Morphological pattern in fishes, named for and typified by the eels

Anguilliformity is a morphological pattern in fishes, named for and typified by the eels. Anguilliform fish have a long, slender body, and travel by anguilliform motion. The caudal fin is often emphasized, with the other fins reduced, absent, or fused with the caudal fin.

Anguilliformity has evolved independently in many groups, including Anguilliformes, the eels; Synbranchiformes, the swamp eels; Clariidae, the airbreathing catfishes; Dipnoi, the lungfishes; Cobitidae, the loaches; and Gymnotidae, the naked-back knifefishes, including the electric eel Electrophorus electricus.

Research into the locomotion of anguilliform fish has provided insights into the development of robotic models that mimic their movement. Understanding the muscle activation and body curvature in these fish aids in designing advanced robotic systems that replicate their efficient movement patterns. Such biomimetic applications have implications for underwater exploration and monitoring technologies.

The study of anguilliform body dynamics provides essential insights into understanding the interaction between muscle activation and body curvature, which defines the locomotion of these species. A continuum model has been developed to simulate this interaction, providing a framework for analysing how anguilliform fish achieve their distinctive movement.

The anguilliform body plan demonstrates convergent evolution, where distantly related lineages have independently evolved similar morphological and locomotory adaptations. Research on eel migration patterns has revealed that phylogenetically distant groups within Anguilliformes—including both anguillid eels (freshwater eels) and congrid eels (conger eels)—have independently evolved similar life history strategies despite diverging approximately 150 million years ago. This parallel evolution extends beyond behaviour to encompass the fundamental anguilliform characteristics: the elongated, snake-like body form and undulatory swimming motion that define this group. The independent development of anguilliform traits across multiple eel lineages indicates how natural selection has repeatedly favoured this particular body plan and locomotory strategy in marine environments.
