= Nesiarchus nasutus =

Conservation status
- Least Concern (IUCN 3.1)

Scientific classification
- Kingdom: Animalia
- Phylum: Chordata
- Class: Actinopterygii
- Order: Scombriformes
- Family: Gempylidae
- Genus: Nesiarchus
- Species: N. nasutus

Binomial name
- Nesiarchus nasutus J. Y. Johnson, 1862

Synonyms
- Prometheus paradoxus Capello, 1867; Thyrsitops violaceus Bean, 1887; Bipinnula violacea (Bean, 1887); Escolar violaceus (Bean, 1887)

Species of fish

Nesiarchus nasutus, the black gemfish or violet snake mackerel, is a species of snake mackerel found in tropical and subtropical waters in most parts of the world, though not in east Pacific and north Indian waters. It occurs at depths of from 200 to 1,200 metres (660 to 3,940 ft) though they make diel vertical migrations from benthopelagic to mesopelagic depths at night. This species can reach a length of 130 centimetres (51 in) SL though most do not exceed 80 centimetres (31 in) SL. It is of minor importance to local commercial fisheries. This species is currently the only known member of its genus, Nesiarchus.
