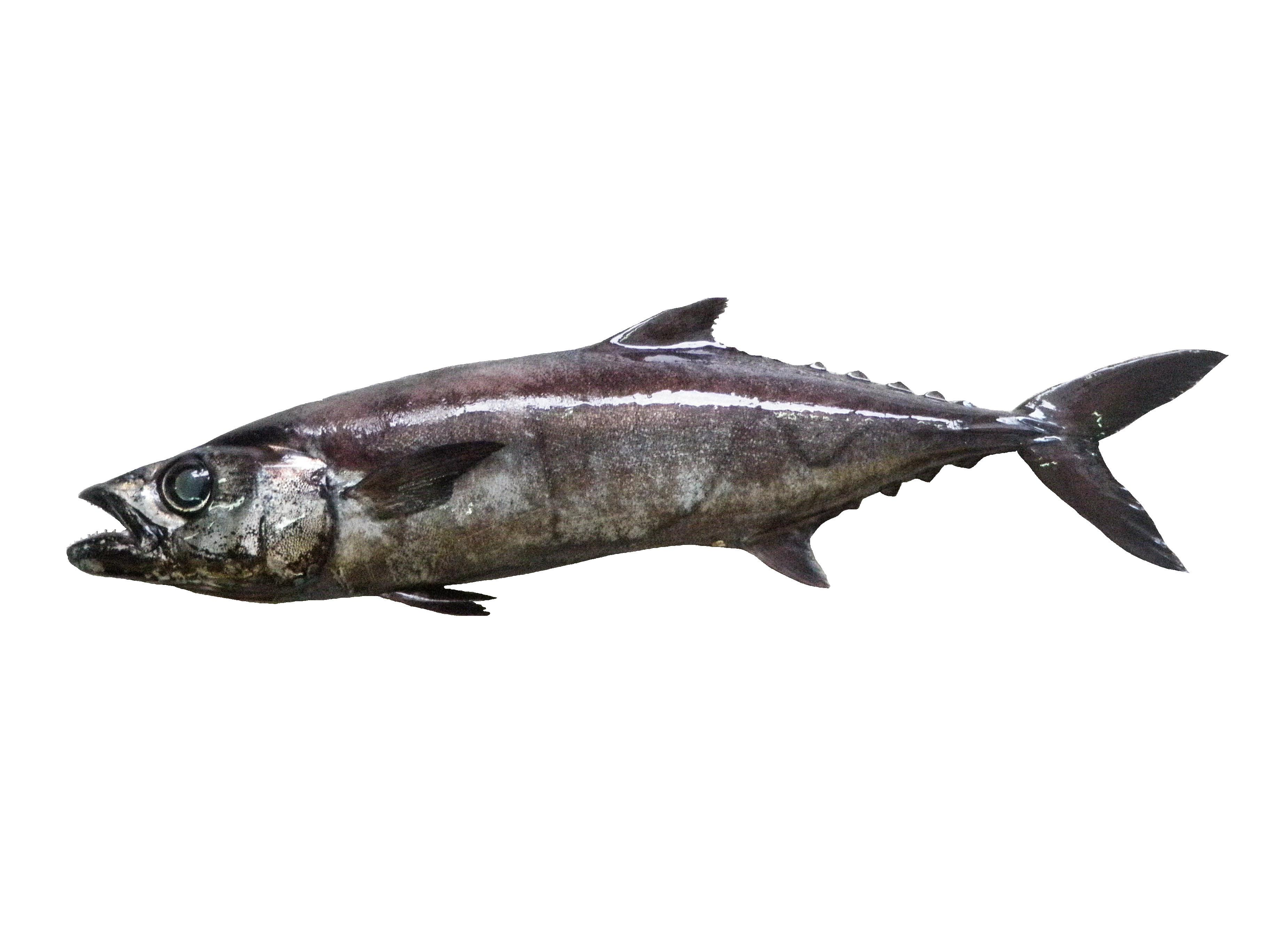

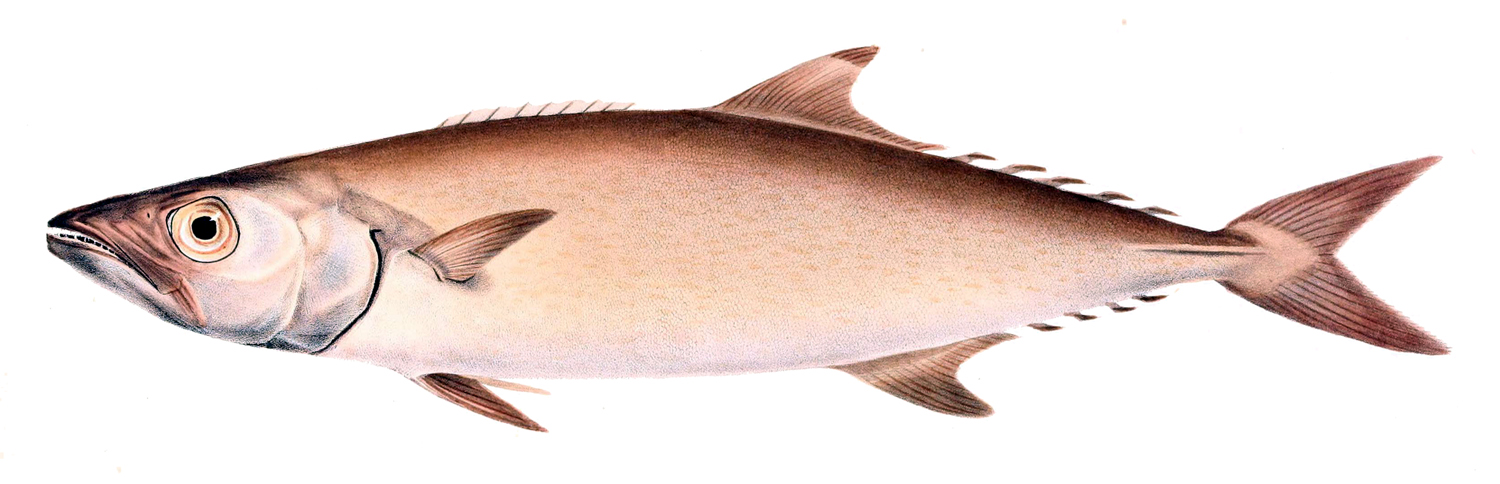

Conservation status
- Least Concern (IUCN 3.1)

Scientific classification
- Kingdom: Animalia
- Phylum: Chordata
- Class: Actinopterygii
- Division: Teleostei
- Order: Scombriformes
- Family: Lepidocybiidae; Johnson, 1986
- Genus: Lepidocybium; T. N. Gill, 1862
- Species: L. flavobrunneum

Binomial name
- Lepidocybium flavobrunneum (A. Smith, 1843)

Synonyms
- Cybium flavobrunneum A. Smith, 1843; Xenogramma carinatum Waite, 1904; Nesogrammus thompsoni Fowler, 1923; Lepidosarda retigramma Kishinouye, 1926; Diplogonurus maderensis Noronha, 1926

= Escolar =

Species of ray-finned fish

The escolar (Lepidocybium flavobrunneum) is a species of scombriform ray-finned fish with a cosmopolitan distribution in tropical and temperate oceans at depths of 200 to 1,100 metres (660 to 3,610 ft). Also known as snake mackerel or walu walu (Hawaiian, sometimes written waloo), it is the only member of the genus Lepidocybium and the family Lepidocybiidae.

== Description ==
The escolar is dark brown, growing darker with age until it is quite black. It is a fast-swimming fish with a prominent lateral keel and four to six finlets after the anal and second dorsal fins. Escolar can grow to over 2 metres (7 ft) in length, but are on average around 1.5 metres (4.9 ft). Like its relative the oilfish (Ruvettus pretiosus), escolar cannot metabolize the wax esters naturally found in its diet, instead distributing the undigestible oil throughout their bodies. As a result, around 20% of the escolar's body weight is oil.

== Habitat and ecology ==
Escolar are widely distributed throughout coastal and temperate waters. They are typically found on the edges of continental slopes below 200 meters and exhibit a benthopelagic lifestyle by floating in the water column over the sea floor. Migrating upwards at night, Escolar prey on a variety of squid, crustaceans, and other fish.

== Human use ==
Fisheries do not typically target escolar, but they are often caught as bycatch by longline fishers and sold for profit. Because of the escolar's oily flesh, consumption of these fish can cause keriorrhea, also called gempylotoxism or gempylid fish poisoning. Symptoms range from stomach cramps to rapid loose bowel movements, occurring 30 minutes to 36 hours following consumption.

=== Mislabeling ===
Escolar can be mislabeled in both restaurants and at fish markets. In 2009, tuna samples from sushi restaurants in New York City and Denver were DNA tested. Five of nine restaurants serving fish labeled "white tuna", "white tuna (albacore)" or "super white tuna" were actually serving escolar. From 2010 to 2013, a study by Oceana, an ocean preservation organization, tested over 114 samples of tuna, and found that 84% of the white tuna samples were actually escolar.

=== Regulation and banning ===
Italy and Japan have banned the sale of escolar due to its potential side effects. It has been banned for consumption in Japan since 1977, as the Japanese government considers it toxic. In 1999, the Swedish and Danish national food administrations informed fish trade associations and fish importing companies about the problems escolar and related fish could cause if not prepared properly and issued recommendations.

In early 2007, after a public outcry, receiving consumer complaints about mislabeled fish and conducting an investigation, the Hong Kong government's Centre for Food Safety recommended escolar not be used for catering purposes, advised clear labeling and identification of fish species before sale, and purchase of fish from reliable sources, and recommended consumers become aware of the possible health effects of consumption of escolar, oilfish, and related species. The Hong Kong government has established a working group composed of members of the academia, trade, and consumer groups to prepare guidelines for assisting the trade and consumers in identifying relevant species of fish.

In the United States, the FDA, after receiving complaints about diarrhea associated with escolar consumption, issued a bulletin recommending against import of the fish in the early 1990s. However, the FDA backed away from this recommendation and withdrew the bulletin several years later after deciding the fish was nontoxic and nonlethal. Currently, the FDA informally recommends, "Escolar should not be marketed in interstate commerce."

In mid-2007, the Canadian Food Inspection Agency, after investigating cases of diarrhea caused by mislabeled fish, decided not to ban escolar or oilfish, but instead issued a fact sheet noting the potential adverse effects of consumption and recommending consumers speak with their retailer, verify fish species and consume the fish in small portion sizes using preparation methods that reduce oil content.

Hawaiian State Representative James Tokioka introduced HB2669, a bill aimed at banning the catch, sale or possession of escolar. HB2669 was deferred on February 1, 2010.
