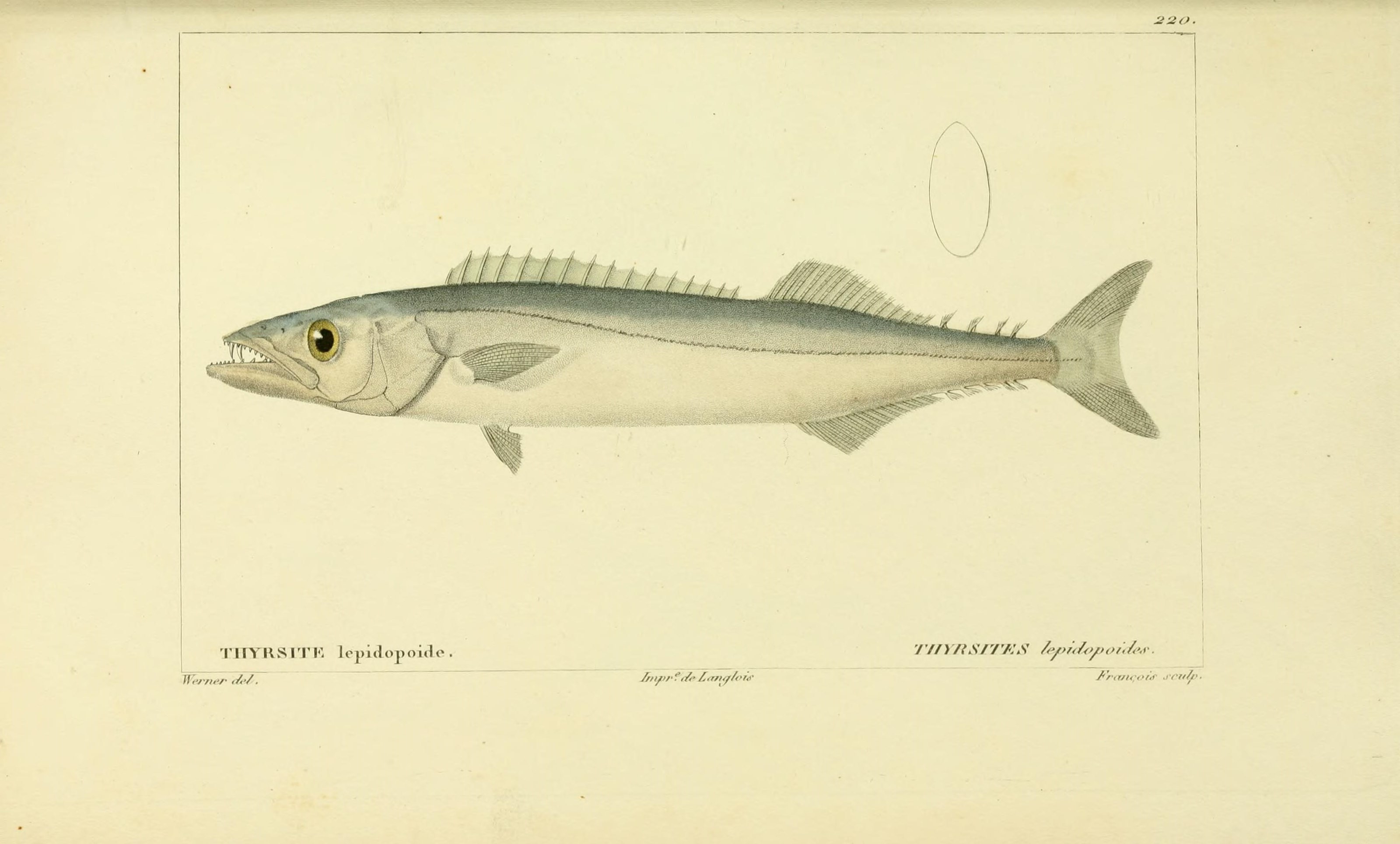
- Illustration

Scientific classification
- Kingdom: Animalia
- Phylum: Chordata
- Class: Actinopterygii
- Order: Scombriformes
- Family: Gempylidae
- Genus: Thyrsites; Cuvier, 1832
- Species: T. lepidopodea

Binomial name
- Thyrsites lepidopodea (R.P. Lesson, 1831)

Synonyms
- Thyrsites lepidopoides G. Cuvier, 1832; Thyrsitops lepidopoides (Cuvier, 1832)

= Thyrsites lepidopodea =

Species of fish

Thyrsites lepidopodea, the white snake mackerel, is a species of snake mackerel found off the coasts of South America from Brazil on the Atlantic side to Chile on the Pacific side. It can be found at depths of from 30 to 350 metres (100 to 1,150 ft). This species can reach a length of 40 centimetres (16 in) SL though most do not exceed 25 centimetres (9.8 in) SL. It is of minor importance to local commercial fisheries. It is currently the only known member of its genus. It eats small fish and euphausiids.
