= Cecil von Bonde =

South African marine biologist (1895–1983)

- Born: July 19, 1895; Cape Town
- Died: March 21, 1983 (aged 87)
- Known for: Zoologist, Fisheries Scientist and Oceanographer

Cecil von Bonde (born Cape Town 19 July 1895; died 21 March 1983) was a South African zoologist, fisheries scientist and oceanographer.

== Biography ==
Von Bonde was born in Cape Town and matriculated at the Normal College Boys' High School, Cape Town, in 1912 before going on to the University of Cape Town where he attained his Master of Arts degree and was appointed as a Senior Lecturer in Zoology in 1918. He gained his Doctor of Philosophy (PhD) in zoology from the University of Cape Town in 1923, his thesis was "The zoogeographical distribution of the Heterosomata [flat fishes]". Between 1924 and 1925 he studied oceanography at the University of Liverpool, also serving as a lecturer in Zoology there. He returned to Cape Town in 1926 where he was appointed as acting head of the Zoology Department following the death of Professor J.D.F. Gilchrist.

He was appointed as Director of Fisheries and Government Marine Biologist in South Africa in 1928 when he was also seconded to the Conference of East African Governors to conduct fisheries and marine biological surveys in Kenya and Zanzibar. The following year, he attended the International Conference on Oceanography and Continental Hydrography in Seville, Spain as a representative of the government of the Union of South Africa. In 1932 he travelled to the United States and Canada, following the award of a Carnegie Research Grant, where he visited the various marine biological and fisheries laboratories. In traveling to Europe in 1937 where he visited Germany, France and the United Kingdom as well as travelling to the United States and Canada again to broaden his experience of fisheries research and technology. He was a delegate of the Union Government to the second Conference of the F.A.O. in Copenhagen in 1946, becoming a member of the Fisheries Committee and being appointed to the Standing Advisory Committee of Fisheries of F.A.O. von Bonde was appointed as an International Whaling Commissioner in 1949 and later was appointed Chairman of the Whaling Technical Committee.

During von Bonde's tenure as Director of Fisheries, which ended in 1952, he had an important role in the development of the South African fishing industry, particularly the fishery of pelagic shoaling fishes, and in the research on Southern African marine resources. He was the author of numerous papers and articles on a number of marine biology and fisheries topics. He was also the author of textbooks, the last being 1956's "So Great Thy Sea". He was appointed as managing director of the Fisheries Development Corporation of South Africa in 1952 the position he remained in until his retirement in 1960. On retirement he went to live in Knysna, he remained an actively interested in all fisheries matters up until his death in 1983, following the developments and growth of the South African fishing industry and the resource research that he had helped to develop through its difficult early years. He married Marjorie Leibrandt in 1922.

He was a Fellow of the American Association for the Advancement of Science and the Royal Society of South Africa, as well as being a member of the South African Association for the Advancement of Science, for which organisation he served as president of Section D in 1931. His presidential address dealt with "The correlation between marine biology and the problems of the fishing industry". He was also a member of the South African Biological Society, the American Society of Ichthyologists and Herpetologists, and a Fellow of the International Biographical Association (London). He received many awards including the Purcell Memorial Prize for Zoology of the University of Cape Town in 1926, the King George V Jubilee Silver Medal in 1936 and the King George VI Coronation Silver Medal in 1937.

== Publications ==
Works published by von Bonde include:

- Report on a preliminary survey of the sea fisheries of Kenya Colony by Cecil von Bonde( Book )
- The natural history and utilization of the cape crawfish, kreef or spiny lobster, Jasus (Palinurus) lalandii (Milne Edwards) Ortmann by Cecil von Bonde( Book )
- The South African marine fishes of commercial and angling importance by J. M Marchand( Book )
- 'Comparative Zoology, etc. by Cecil VON BONDE( Book )
- Die Voorplanting, embriologie, en metamorfose van de Kaapse kreef-Jasus lalandii (Milne Edwards) Ortmann. [With plates.] by Cecil VON BONDE( Book )
- Report on a Preliminary Survey of the Marine Fisheries of the Zanzibar Protectorate. By Cecil von Bonde by Zanzibar( Book )
- So great thy sea; a study of the oceans by Cecil von Bonde( Book )
- The Heterosomata (flat fishes) by Cecil Von Bonde( Book )
- Shark Fishing as an industry, by Cecil von Bonde( Book )

== Taxon described by him ==
- See Category:Taxa named by Cecil von Bonde
