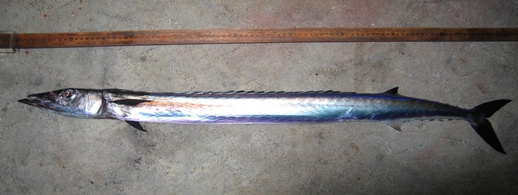

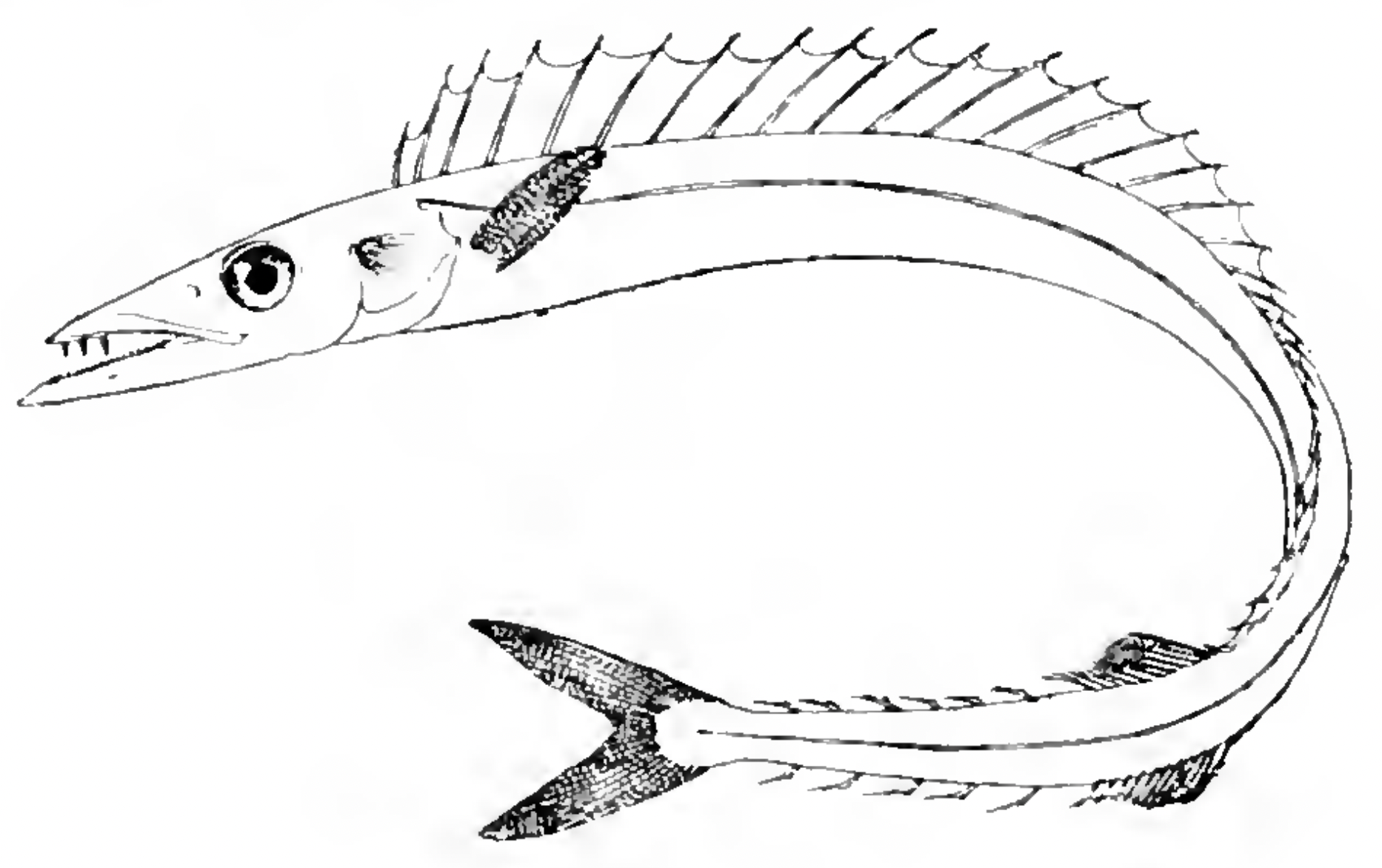

Conservation status
- Least Concern (IUCN 3.1)

Scientific classification
- Kingdom: Animalia
- Phylum: Chordata
- Class: Actinopterygii
- Order: Scombriformes
- Family: Gempylidae
- Genus: Gempylus
- Species: G. serpens

Binomial name
- Gempylus serpens G. Cuvier, 1829

Synonyms
- Gempylus notha (Bory de Saint-Vincent, 1804) (ambiguous name); Acinacea notha Bory de Saint-Vincent, 1804 (ambiguous name); Lemnisoma thyrsitoides Lesson, 1831; Gempylus coluber G. Cuvier, 1832; Gempylus ophidianus Poey, 1860

= Snake mackerel =

Species of fish

The snake mackerel (Gempylus serpens) is the sole species of fish in the monotypic genus Gempylus, belonging to the family Gempylidae (which is also referred to generally as "snake mackerels"). It is found worldwide in tropical and subtropical oceans between the latitudes of 42°N and 40°S; adults are known to stray into temperate waters. It is found to a depth of 600 meters (2,000 feet). Populations of the snake mackerel from the Atlantic and the Indo-Pacific differ in vertebral count (51–55 versus 48–50) and number of first dorsal fin spines (30–32 versus 26–30), and so may represent separate species.

== Description ==
The snake mackerel has a very long, slender, laterally compressed body. It has a long, pointed head, measuring 17–18% of the standard length, and a large mouth with the lower jaw protruding beyond the upper. Both jaws are densely packed with sharp teeth; the first few teeth in the upper jaw are enlarged into fangs. The pectoral fins contain 12–15 rays; the pelvic fins are tiny and located beneath the pectorals, containing 1 small spine and 3–4 rays. There are two dorsal fins; the first is long and spiny, and is followed immediately by the second, which contains 1 tiny spine and 11–14 soft rays. The anal fin originates opposite the second dorsal fin and consists of 2 free spines followed by 1 spine and 10–12 rays. The dorsal and anal fins are followed by 6–7 finlets. There are two lateral lines, with the upper running to the rear of the first dorsal fin and the lower running to the caudal peduncle. The scales are mostly absent. The coloration is metallic brown, with dark fins. This species grows to 1 meter (3.3 feet) in length.

== Behaviour ==
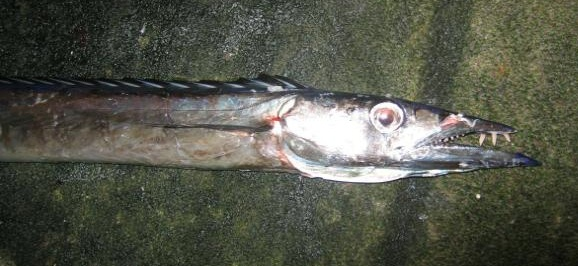
The head of a snake mackerel. Note the enlarged front teeth in the upper jaw.

Adult snake mackerels conduct a diel vertical migration, staying in deeper water during the day and rising to the surface at night to feed. The young and juveniles also migrate vertically but in the opposite direction, staying near the surface during the day and moving deeper at night. This species feeds on squid, pelagic crustaceans, and bony fishes such as lanternfishes, flying fishes, sauries, and mackerel. It is in turn preyed upon by tuna and marlin. There was an 80 cm long specimen found inside a dead black swallower which measured 25 cm. Reproduction is oviparous, with females producing 300,000 to 1,000,000 eggs. Spawning occurs year-round; spawning areas are known to exist in the Caribbean Sea and off the coast of Florida. Males reach sexual maturity at 43 cm (17 in) long and females at 50 cm (20 in) long. As the fish mature and move into deeper water where there is less available light, they lose the cone cells in their eyes in favor of rod cells.

== Human interaction ==
The snake mackerel is caught as bycatch in the tuna longline fishery and is of minor commercial importance. It is marketed frozen or in sausages and fish cakes. In Hawaii, this fish is known as hāuliuli and is considered good eating cooked or dried. King Kamehameha was apparently not fond of it, as he once remarked that it is a "delicious fish for the back country people", meaning fine for those who could not obtain anything better. A night-time encounter with Gempylus species in the open sea is described by Thor Heyerdahl in the accounts of the Kon-Tiki expedition. After a member of the raft expedition was awoken by a mysterious fish landing on his sleeping bag, the crew member caught a long thin fish that was "over three feet long, as slender as a snake, with dull black eyes and long snout with a greedy jaw full of long sharp teeth. The teeth were sharp as knives and could be folded back into the roof of the mouth to make way for what is swallowed." Later Thor Heyerdahl notes: "Only the skeleton of a fish like this one had been found a few times on the coast of South America and the Galapagos Islands; ichthyologists ... thought it lived at the bottom of the sea at a great depth, because no one had ever seen it alive. But if it lived at a great depth, this must at any rate be by day, when the sun blinded the big eyes. For on dark nights Gempylus was abroad high over the surface of the sea; we on the raft had experience of that".
