= Pabdeh Formation =

Geologic formation in Iran

- Stratigraphic range: middle Eocene to early Oligocene, 41–33.9 Ma
- Type: Formation
- Unit of: Zagros fold and thrust belt
- Underlies: Asmari Formation
- Overlies: Gurpi Formation

Lithology
- Primary: Marl, limestone
- Other: Oil shales

Location
- Country: Iran

The Pabdeh Formation is a Middle Eocene to Early Oligocene-aged geological formation in Iran. It outcrops along the Zagros Mountains. It was deposited in a deepwater environment in the upper bathyal zone of the Paratethys Sea, with these abyssal sediments being lifted high above sea level from the uplift of the Zagros fold and thrust belt as part of the Alpide orogeny.

A high number of fossil fishes are known from this formation, the majority of which appear to have pelagic and deepwater affinities. These are mostly known from two localities near Elam and Istehbanat. The age of these localities have been disputed, and have previously been considered to be Early Oligocene, but are now generally thought to be middle to late Eocene in age, most likely Priabonian. More recent studies have estimated the age of these fossil-bearing lcoalities as slightly older and dated the formation to the Bartonian stage, based on the presence of certain foraminifera not present during the Priabonian. Some fossils of migratory insects (a locust and ant alates), as well as fish and birds, are also known from near Babaheidar.

== Paleobiota ==
=== Cartilaginous fishes ===
Genus	Species	Notes	Images
Xiphodolamia	X. serrata	A xiphodolamiid shark	

=== Bony fishes ===
Based primarily on Arambourg (1967), with taxonomic changes made where necessary:

Genus	Species	Locality	Notes	Images
Aluvarus	A. praeimperialis	Elam	The larva of a percomorph of uncertain affinities, once thought to be a louvar relative	
Arambourgthurus	A. scombrurus	Istehbanat	A surgeonfish; inhabited a pelagic ecosystem, similar to species of Naso	
Argyropelecus	A. iranicus	Babaheidar	A marine hatchetfish	
Argyropelecus	A. zagrosensis	Babaheidar	A marine hatchetfish	
?Astronesthes	?A. simus	Elam	An apparent stareater, taxonomic affinity uncertain	
Babelichthys	B. olneyi	Elam	A bizarre crestfish	
Berycomorus	B. firdoussi	Elam	A beryciform	
Bregmaceros	B. filamentosus	Elam	A codlet	
Caucasiganus	C. sp.	Istehbanat	A relative of rabbitfish	
Cheilinus	C. longifillis	Istehbanat	A wrasse	
Cottopsis	C. gaudryi	Elam	An oceanic basslet	
Dussumieria	D. elami	Elam	A rainbow sardine	
Eosternoptyx	E. discoidalis	Elam	A deep-sea hatchetfish	
Epinnula	E. cancellata	Elam	A snake mackerel	
Etrumeus	E. hafizi	Istehbanat	A round herring	
Grammatorcynus	G. scomberoides	Istehbanat, Elam	A mackerel	
Iraniplectus	I. bakhtiari	Babaheidar	A pufferfish-like tetraodontiform	
Maurolicus	M. morgani	Elam	A pearlside	
?Myroconger	?M. rouslami	Elam	An apparent thin eel, taxonomic affinity uncertain	
Opisthonema	O. persicum	Elam	A thread herring	
Palaeorhynchus	P. altivelis	Istehbanat	A palaeorhynchid billfish	
Palimphyes (=Dipterichthys)	P. nematophorus	Elam	A euzaphlegid	
Palimphyes (=Dipterichthys)	P. leptosomus	Elam	A euzaphlegid	
Parastylephorus	P. anatoides	Babaheydar	A relative of the tube-eye	
Paucaichthys	P. elamensis	Elam	A pomfret	
Praewoodsia	P. mesogeae	Elam	A bristlemouth	
Priacanthopsis	P. crassispinus	Elam	A bigeye	
Proserrivomer	P. mecquenemi	Elam	A sawtooth eel	
Propteridium	P. douvillei	Elam	A viviparous brotula	
Pristigenys	P. macropus	Istehbanat	A bigeye	
Protolophotus	P. elami	Elam	A crestfish	
?Psenes	?P. macrolepis	Elam	A driftfish, taxonomic identity uncertain	
Pseudoholocentrum	P. cristatum	Elam	A holocentrid	
Rybapina	R. orientalis	Elam	A driftfish	
Scomber	S. saadii	Istehbanat	A mackerel	
Scomberomorus	S. speciosus	Istehbanat	A mackerel	
Scopeloides	S. glarisianus	Elam	A bristlemouth	
Sphyraena	S. longimana	Istehbanat	A barracuda	
Thyrsitoides	T. zarathoustrae	Elam	A relative of the blacksail snake mackerel	
?Urosphen	?U. iranensis	Elam	A urosphenid syngnathiform	

=== Birds ===
Genus	Species	Locality	Notes	Images
Diomedeoides (=Frigidafrons)	D. babaheydariensis	Babaheidar	A diomedeoidid seabird	

=== Arthropods ===
==== Crustaceans ====
Based on Garassino, Bahrami, Yazdi & Vega (2014):

Genus	Species	Locality	Notes	Images
Eogordonella	E. iranianiensis	Babaheidar	A solenocerid shrimp	
Eopabdehus	E. babaheydariensis	Babaheidar	A penaeid shrimp	
Parsacus	P. eocenicus	Babaheidar	A slipper lobster	

==== Insecta ====
Genus	Species	Locality	Notes	Images
Acrididae indet.		Babaheidar	A short-horned grasshopper of uncertain affinities, potentially in a migratory locust-like phase	
Formicidae indet.		Babaheidar	A potentially myrmicine ant of uncertain affinities, migratory alates	
