= Double line (disambiguation) =

Double line may refer to:

- Double-track railway, a type of railway with two tracks, usually involving running a track in each direction
  - Double line automatic signalling, a form of railway signalling used on the majority of double track sections in New Zealand
- Double-lined mackerel, Grammatorcynus bilineatus, a species of Spanish mackerel
- Double-lined spectroscopic binary, a type of binary star: see Binary star#Spectroscopic binaries
- Mythimna turca, common name the double line, a moth of the family Noctuidae
- In algebraic geometry, a certain family of conics
