= Thread herring =

Thread herring may refer to either of two herring-like fish in the family Clupeidae:

- Atlantic thread herring (Opisthonema oglinum)
- Pacific thread herring (Opisthonema libertate)
