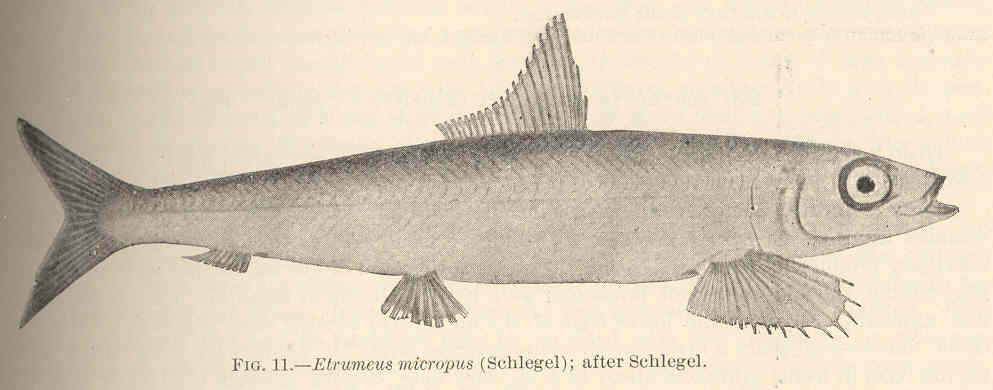

Scientific classification
- Kingdom: Animalia
- Phylum: Chordata
- Class: Actinopterygii
- Division: Teleostei
- Order: Clupeiformes
- Family: Dussumieriidae
- Genus: Etrumeus
- Species: E. micropus

Binomial name
- Etrumeus micropus (Temminck & Schlegel, 1846)

= Etrumeus micropus =

Species of fish

Etrumeus micropus is a species of round-herring that occurs in the western Pacific Ocean.

== Taxonomy ==
Etrumeus micropus was treated as a junior synonym of E. teres by Whitehead (1985), who nonetheless suggested that E. teres might be divisible into species or subspecies. Randall (2007) recognized Etrumeus micropus as a valid species from Japan, Korea, and the Hawaiian Islands, while noting that DNA testing might render the Hawaiian population distinct from the East Asian populations. Subsequent DNA analysis by Randall and DiBattista (2012) showed that the Hawaiian population of Etrumeus micropus is distinct species, which the authors named Etrumeus makiawa.
