= Etrumeus makiawa =

Scientific classification
- Kingdom: Animalia
- Phylum: Chordata
- Class: Actinopterygii
- Order: Clupeiformes
- Family: Dussumieriidae
- Genus: Etrumeus
- Species: E. makiawa

Binomial name
- Etrumeus makiawa Randall and DiBattista, 2012

Species of fish

Etrumeus makiawa, or the Hawaiian red-eye round herring, is a round-herring that occurs in the Hawaiian Islands.

== Taxonomy ==
E. makiawa was originally identified as Etrumeus micropus, but DNA analysis by Randall and DiBattista (2012) concluded that Hawaiian Etrumeus should be recognized as a distinct species, resulting in its being named after the Hawaiian name for round herrings, makiawa.
