= Masjed Soleyman oil field =

Oil field in Masjed Soleyman, Iran

- Location within Iran
- Country: Iran
- Region: Khuzestan Province
- Offshore/onshore: Onshore
- Coordinates: 31°56′11″N 49°18′14″E
- Operators: NISOC
- Partners: NIOC

Field history
- Discovery: 1908

Production
- Current production of oil: 5,000 barrels per day (~2.5×10^{5} t/a)
- Estimated oil in place: 6,000 million barrels (~8.2×10^{8} t)

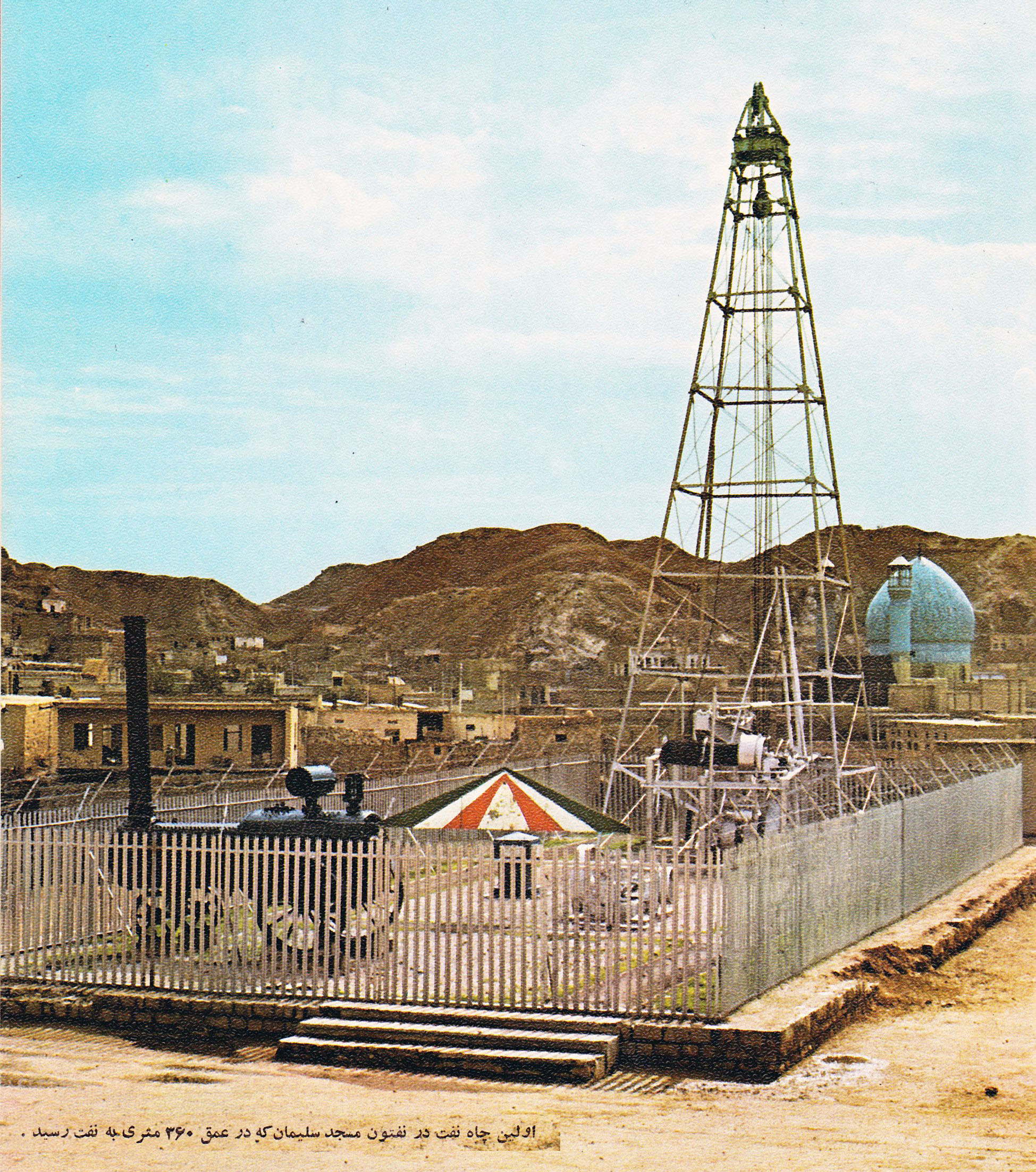
Masjed Soleyman oilfield's First oilwell

The Masjed Soleyman oil field is an oil field located in Masjed Soleyman, Khuzestan Province, Iran and to the northeast of Ahvaz City. It was the first oil field discovered in the Middle East. The field is a mature super-giant, which produces primarily from the prolific Oligocene Asmari horizons, a formation which underpins Iranian crude oil production. The National Iranian South Oil Company operates the field, as well as a number of other fields in the surrounding regions. Oil production of the MasjedSoleyman field is about 5,000 barrels per day (790 m^{3}/d). The field is estimated to contain 6.5 billion barrels of oil. So far 367 wells were drilled in the field, of which only 16 are currently operational. The field is owned by the National Iranian Oil Company (NIOC).

== See also ==
- List of oil fields
