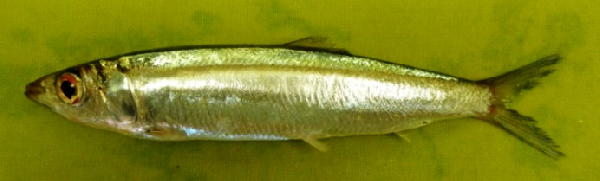

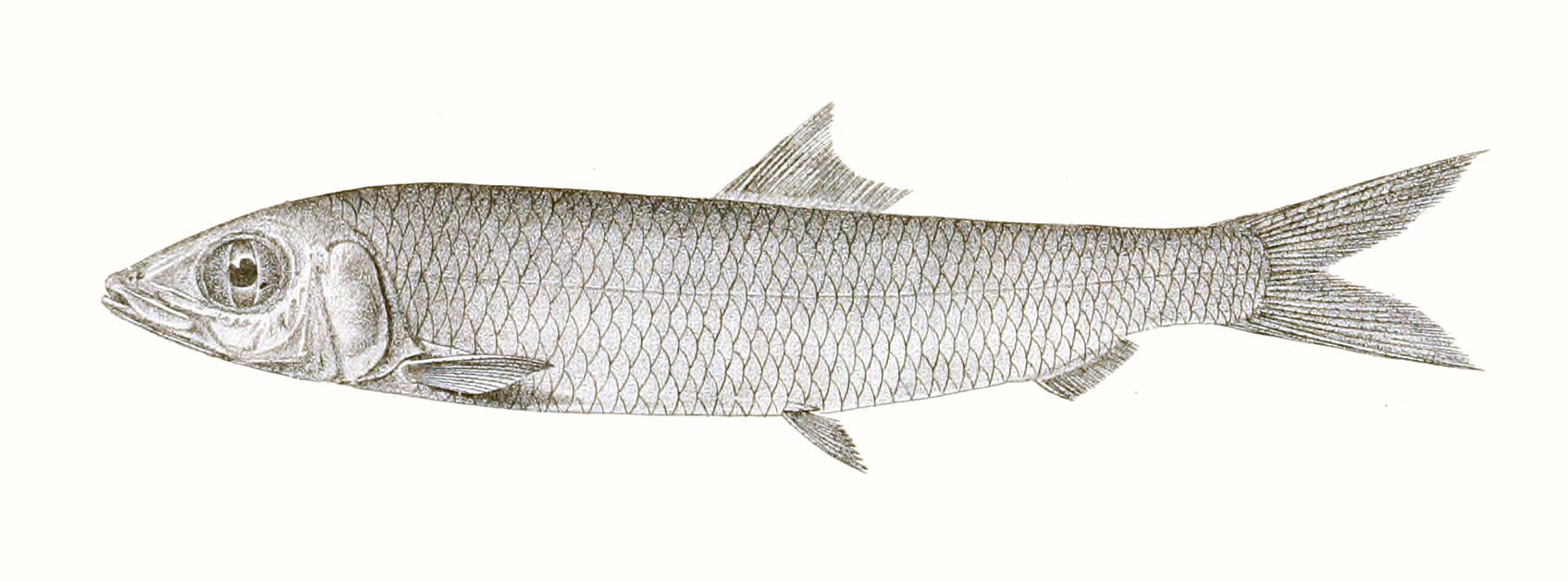

Scientific classification
- Kingdom: Animalia
- Phylum: Chordata
- Class: Actinopterygii
- Order: Clupeiformes
- Family: Dussumieriidae
- Genus: Dussumieria
- Species: D. elopsoides

Binomial name
- Dussumieria elopsoides (Bleeker, 1849)

= Slender rainbow sardine =

Species of fish

The slender rainbow sardine (Dussumieria elopsoides) is a small, subtropical, salt water fish of the Indian Ocean and the South China Sea which was first described by Bleeker in 1849. Dussumieria hasselti and Dussumieria productissima are synonyms for this same fish. It is a round herring of the family Clupeidae.

Until the 1980s in the eastern Mediterranean slender rainbow sardines were frequently confused with the rainbow sardine (Dussumieria acuta). Wangratana (1980) demonstrated the differences between Dussumieria acuta and Dussumieria elopsoides, while Whitehead (1985) and Randall (1996) showed that Dussumieria elopsoides does occur in the Mediterranean.

== Morphology ==
- Size: 8 cm. to 18 cm.
- Color: silvery on the sides darkening to bluish grey on the back, and lightening to almost white on the underside.
- Shape: The slender rainbow sardine has an elongated body, with round belly and a pointed nose. The single dorsal (back) fin is slightly behind midpoint. The tail fin is heavily forked. The scales are very delicate and are easily detached. Like other sardines it has no lateral line, and no scales on the head.

The slender rainbow sardine is primarily differentiated from the rainbow sardine, because the slender rainbow sardines do not have tiny radiating striae on the posterior part of their scales. There is some indication that the slender rainbow sardine may tend to have more vertebra than the rainbow sardine.

== Distribution ==
The native range of the slender rainbow sardine is in the tropical and subtropical portions of the Indian Ocean and the South China Sea. It is found from East Asia in the northeast, through Southeast Asia to northern Australia in the south, and through South Asia to eastern Africa, the Persian Gulf, and the Red Sea in the west. It is also found off the coasts of islands deep in the Pacific, such as Tonga and the Solomon Islands. Dussumieria elopsoides entered the Mediterranean Sea via the Suez Canal in the middle of the last century. Recorded first off Israel in 1949, it is now quite common in the south-eastern Mediterranean from Egypt to Turkey.

== Habits ==
The slender rainbow sardine swims in schools and while pelagic it is generally found near shores. It feeds on zooplankton, mainly crustacean and smaller fish. The slender rainbow sardine spawns mainly in spring. Its eggs, and when they hatch the larvae, drift passively until they metamorphose into free-swimming fish.

== Economics ==
Like other sardines the slender rainbow sardine is caught both as a bait fish and for human consumption. Frequently fishermen catch them in shore with a purse seine (an encircling net) and then release them in deeper water where they attract larger fish.

Some sardines are made into fish meal which is then used as an animal feed or plant supplement. Oil is also extracted for a variety of uses from varnish to cooking oil.

FAO code: CLUP Duss 2
