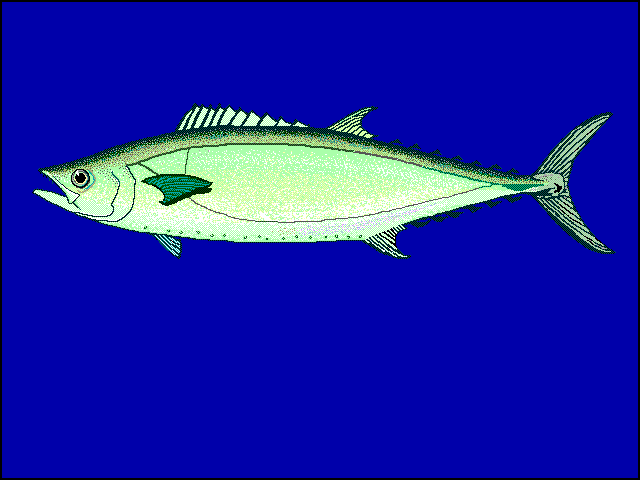

Conservation status
- Least Concern (IUCN 3.1)

Scientific classification
- Kingdom: Animalia
- Phylum: Chordata
- Class: Actinopterygii
- Division: Teleostei
- Order: Scombriformes
- Family: Scombridae
- Tribe: Scomberomorini
- Genus: Grammatorcynus
- Species: G. bicarinatus

Binomial name
- Grammatorcynus bicarinatus (Quoy & Gaimard, 1825)

Synonyms
- Thynnus bicarinatus Quoy and Gaimard, 1825

= Shark mackerel =

Species of fish

The shark mackerel (Grammatorcynus bicarinatus) is a species of Spanish mackerel (tribe Scomberomorini) in the scombrid family (Scombridae). Their maximum reported length is 112 cm (44 in), and the maximum reported weight is 13.5 kg (30 lb).

This species is sometimes also called the largescaled tunny, large-scaled tunny or salmon mackerel. Before 1983, this species was sometimes confused with Grammatorcynus bilineatus, the double-lined mackerel.

== See also ==
- Mackerel as food
