= Etrumeus whiteheadi =

Conservation status
- Least Concern (IUCN 3.1)

Scientific classification
- Kingdom: Animalia
- Phylum: Chordata
- Class: Actinopterygii
- Order: Clupeiformes
- Family: Dussumieriidae
- Genus: Etrumeus
- Species: E. whiteheadi

Binomial name
- Etrumeus whiteheadi Wongratana, 1983

Species of fish

Etrumeus whiteheadi, Whitehead's round herring, is a species of marine ray-finned fish belonging to the family Dussumieriidae, the round herrings. This species is found in the southeastern Atlantic Ocean and the southwestern Indian Ocean around the coasts of Namibia and South Africa. This species is an important target for fisheries in Namibia and South Africa.
