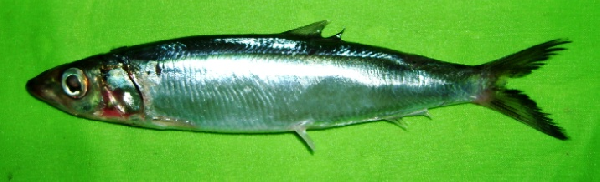

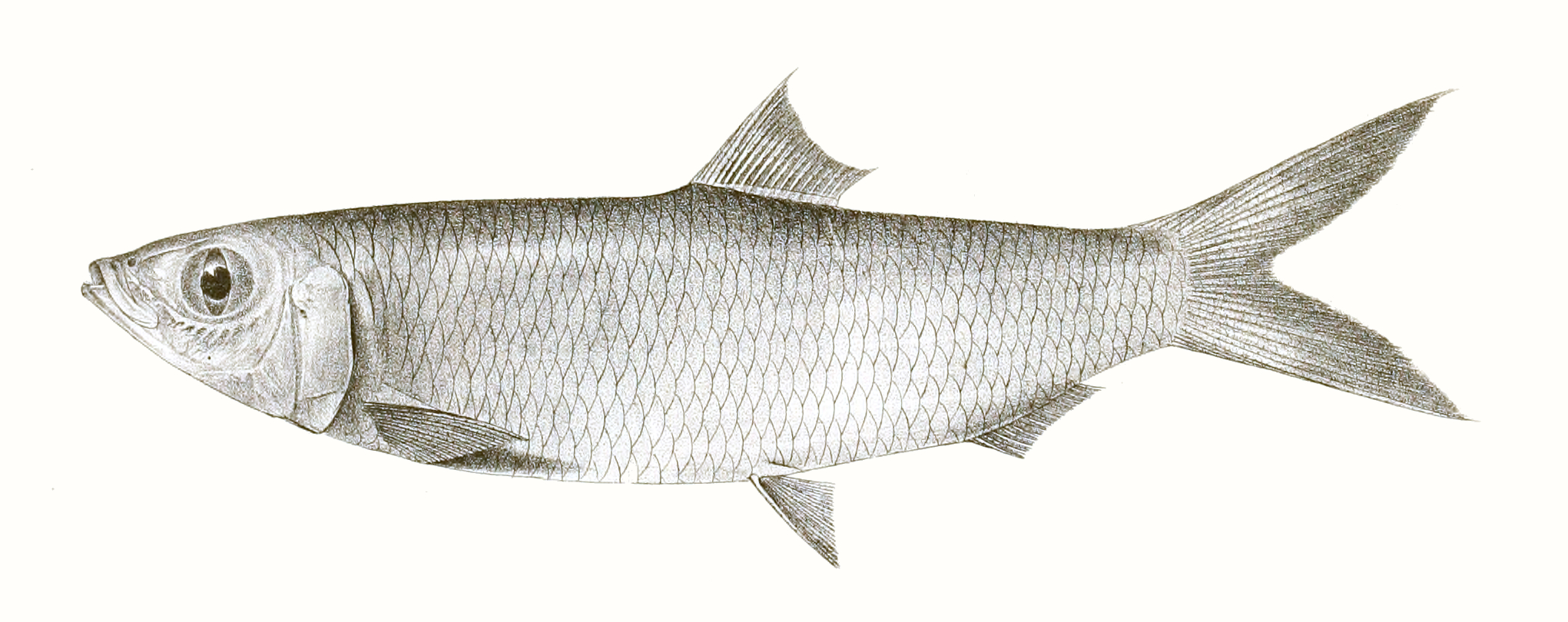

Scientific classification
- Kingdom: Animalia
- Phylum: Chordata
- Class: Actinopterygii
- Order: Clupeiformes
- Family: Dussumieriidae
- Genus: Dussumieria
- Species: D. acuta

Binomial name
- Dussumieria acuta Valenciennes, 1847

Synonyms
- Dussumiera acuta Valenciennes, 1847; Clupea flosmaris Richardson, 1846; Elops javanicus Valenciennes, 1847; Etrumeus albulina Fowler, 1934

= Rainbow sardine =

Species of fish

The rainbow sardine (Dussumieria acuta), also known as common sprat, dwarf round herring, rainbow herring, and sharpnosed sprat, is a bony fish important to aquaculture and commercial fisheries.

== Description ==
The color of the rainbow sardine is iridescent blue with a bit of shiny gold or brass line below, which quickly fades after death; the hind margin of the tail is broadly dark. The fish has a w-shaped pelvic scute; an isthmus tapering evenly forward; and more anal fin rays. There are 14 to 18 anal soft rays. The maximum length recorded is 22 cm.

== Distribution and habitat ==
Marine and estuarine species, the rainbow sardine can be found in Indo-Pacific regions such as the Persian Gulf (and perhaps south to Somalia), Bangladesh, Pakistan, India, Sri Lanka and Malaysia to Indonesia (Kalimantan) and the Philippines. The species now also occurs in the Mediterranean, having invaded as a Lessepsian migrant through the Suez Canal.

== See also ==
- Sardine
- Slender rainbow sardine Dussumieria elopsoides
- List of common commercial fish of Sri Lanka

== Bibliography ==
- Froese, Rainer; Pauly, Daniel (eds.). "Dussumieria acuta". FishBase. June 2006 version.
