= Berycomorus =

Berycomorus Temporal range: Late Eocene, Priabonian

Scientific classification
- Domain: Eukaryota
- Kingdom: Animalia
- Phylum: Chordata
- Class: Actinopterygii
- Order: Beryciformes
- Genus: †Berycomorus; Arambourg, 1967
- Species: †B. firdoussi

Binomial name
- †Berycomorus firdoussi (Arambourg, 1967)

Extinct genus of fishes

Berycomorus is an extinct genus of prehistoric marine ray-finned fish that lived during the late Eocene epoch. It contains a single species, B. firdoussi, from the Pabdeh Formation of Iran.

Its formation has been usually dated to the early Oligocene, though more recent studies have found it to date to the late Eocene. Some studies have found it to specifically be a berycid, although it is generally considered an indeterminate beryciform. It appears to have inhabited a deep-ocean habitat in the Tethys Ocean, based on the abundance of stomiiform fossils from the same formation.

== See also ==
- Prehistoric fish
- List of prehistoric bony fish
