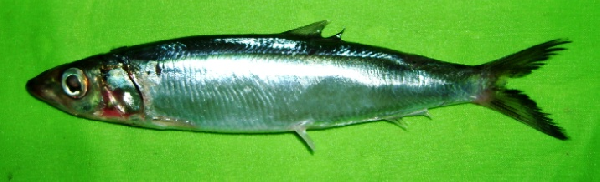
- D. acuta

Scientific classification
- Kingdom: Animalia
- Phylum: Chordata
- Class: Actinopterygii
- Order: Clupeiformes
- Family: Dussumieriidae
- Genus: Dussumieria; Valenciennes, 1847

Species
- See text

= Dussumieria =

Dussumieria Temporal range: Late Eocene to present

Genus of fishes

Dussumieria is the genus of rainbow sardines, a group within the round herring family Dussumieriidae. They are found in Indo-Pacific.

== Species ==
The following is a list of currently accepted living Dussumieria species:

- Dussumieria acuta Valenciennes, 1847 (Rainbow sardine)
- Dussumieria albulina Fowler, 1934 (Lancer rainbow sardine)
- Dussumieria apollo Hata, Lavoué, Appleyard & Pogonoski, 2025 (Australian rainbow sardine)
- Dussumieria elopsoides Bleeker, 1849 (Slender rainbow sardine)
- Dussumieria hasselti Bleeker, 1851 (Hasselt's rainbow sardine)
- Dussumieria modakandai Singh, Jayakumar, Kumar, Murali, Mishra, Singh & Lal, 2022 (Soft rainbow sardine)
- Dussumieria productissima Chabanaud, 1933 (Javelin rainbow sardine)
- Dussumieria torpedo Hata, Lavoué & Motomura, 2021 (African rainbow sardine)

The earliest known fossil species is D. elami Arambourg, 1967 from the ?Late Eocene of Iran (Pabdeh Formation) and potentially the Early Oligocene of Romania.
