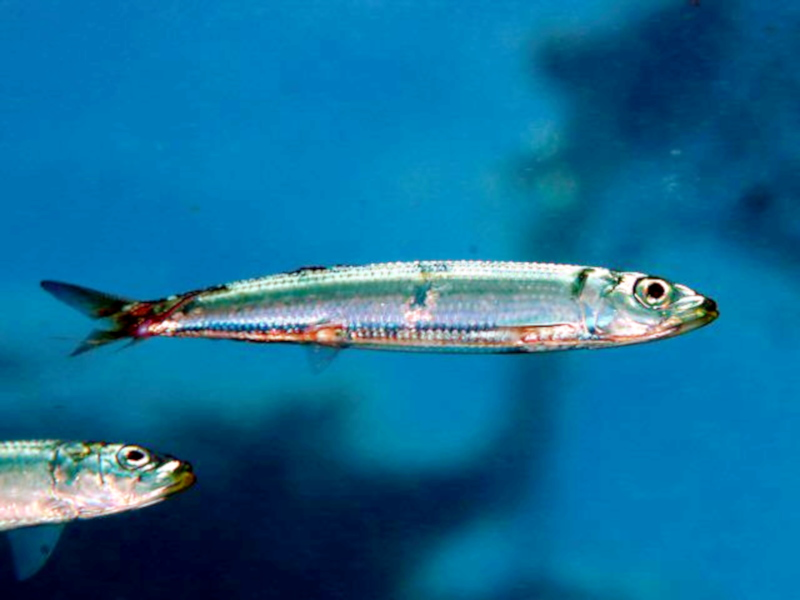

Conservation status
- Least Concern (IUCN 3.1)

Scientific classification
- Kingdom: Animalia
- Phylum: Chordata
- Class: Actinopterygii
- Division: Teleostei
- Order: Clupeiformes
- Family: Dussumieriidae
- Genus: Etrumeus
- Species: E. sadina

Binomial name
- Etrumeus sadina (Mitchill, 1814)

Synonyms
- Etrumeus teres (DeKay, 1842)

= Etrumeus sadina =

Species of fish

Etrumeus sadina, the red-eye round herring, is a species of fish belonging to the family Dussumieriidae, a family notable for their rounded bellies.

== Description ==
The red-eye round herring has a very slim rounded body. Its anal and pelvic fins are small, and its scales are large and thin. Because of this, they often become dislodged when being caught. Its side and underside are silvery in color, and its back is a murky green.

== Distribution and habitat ==
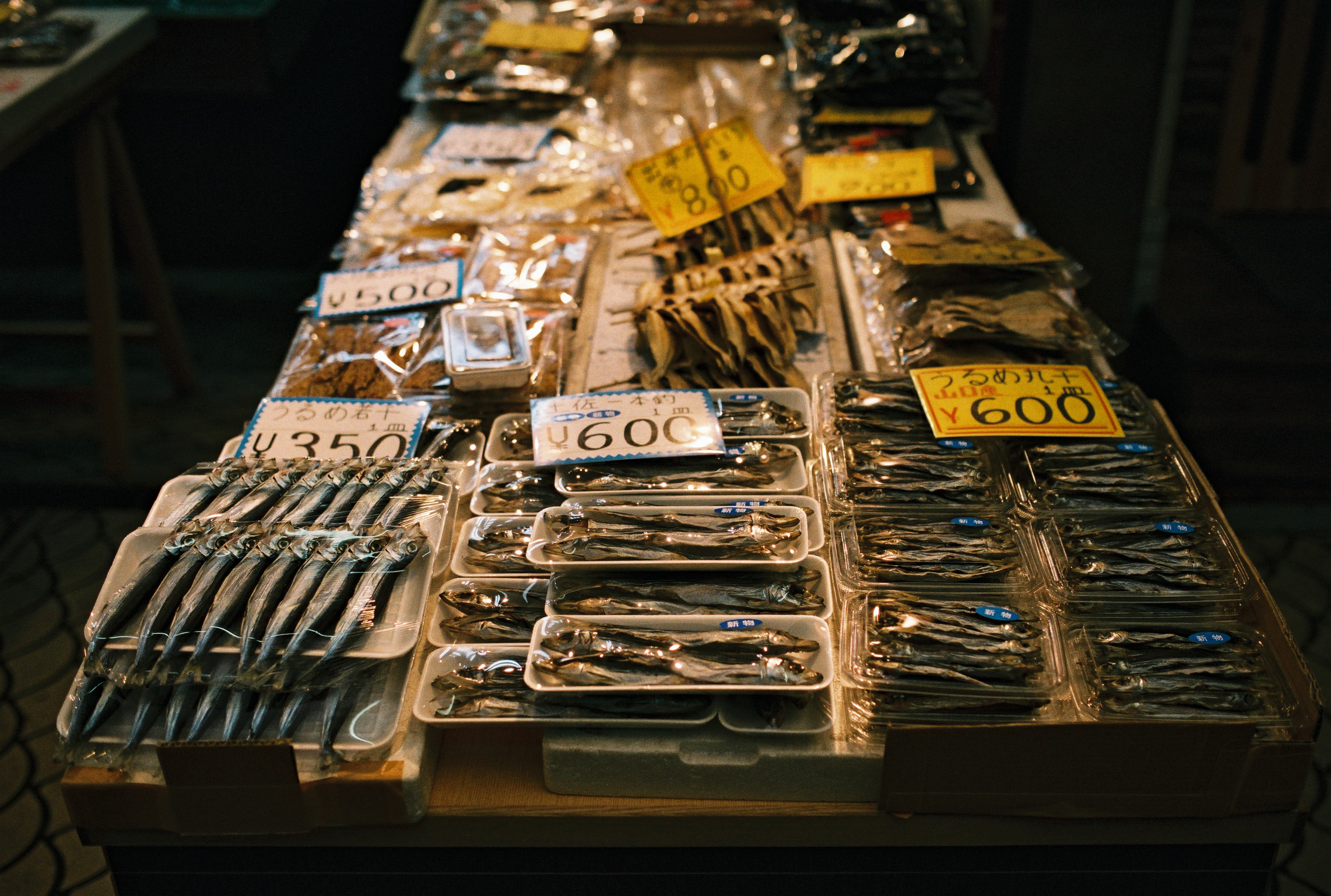
Sold in Hyōgo, Japan

Round herrings are found in the northwestern Atlantic Ocean, from the Bay of Fundy to Florida and the Gulf of Mexico. It can be found inshore during the summer in the northern sections of its occurring range, but in the southern half of its range, it is found further from the shore at around 50 to 150 m depth.
