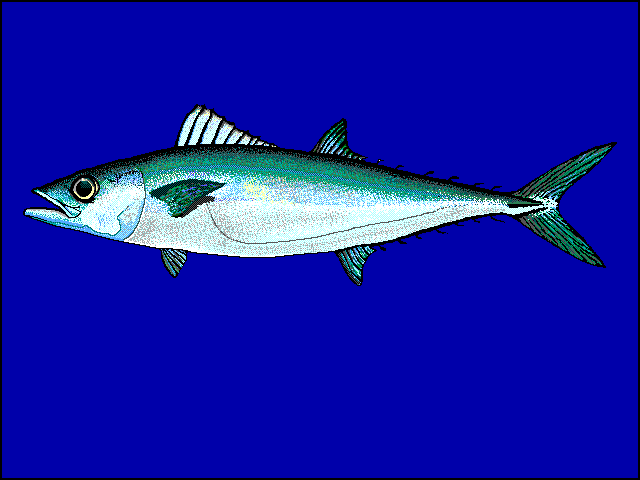
- Drawing of Grammatorcynus bilineatus

Conservation status
- Least Concern (IUCN 3.1)

Scientific classification
- Kingdom: Animalia
- Phylum: Chordata
- Class: Actinopterygii
- Order: Scombriformes
- Family: Scombridae
- Genus: Grammatorcynus
- Species: G. bilineatus

Binomial name
- Grammatorcynus bilineatus (Rüppell, 1836)

Synonyms
- Thynnus bilineatus Rüppell, 1836; Nesogrammus piersoni Evermann and Seale, 1907

= Double-lined mackerel =

Species of fish

The double-lined mackerel (Grammatorcynus bilineatus), is a species of Spanish mackerel (tribe Scomberomorini) in the family Scombridae. This species is sometimes also called the scad mackerel (not be confused with the mackerel scad in the Carangidae family).

== Description ==
The double-lined mackerel has an elongated and slightly compressed body covered with small scales, with a relatively small mouth and large eyes. Like other Scombridaes, it lacks a swim bladder. The body color is dark blue on the back, silvery on the sides, silvery white on the belly. They have 11-13 dorsal spines, 10-14 dorsal soft rays and 10-14 anal soft rays on their fins. The pectoral fins are rather short. There are two lateral lines, one on the dorsal profile, and the other at the height of the pectoral fins. This is unique among fish, as most only have one on each side of the body.

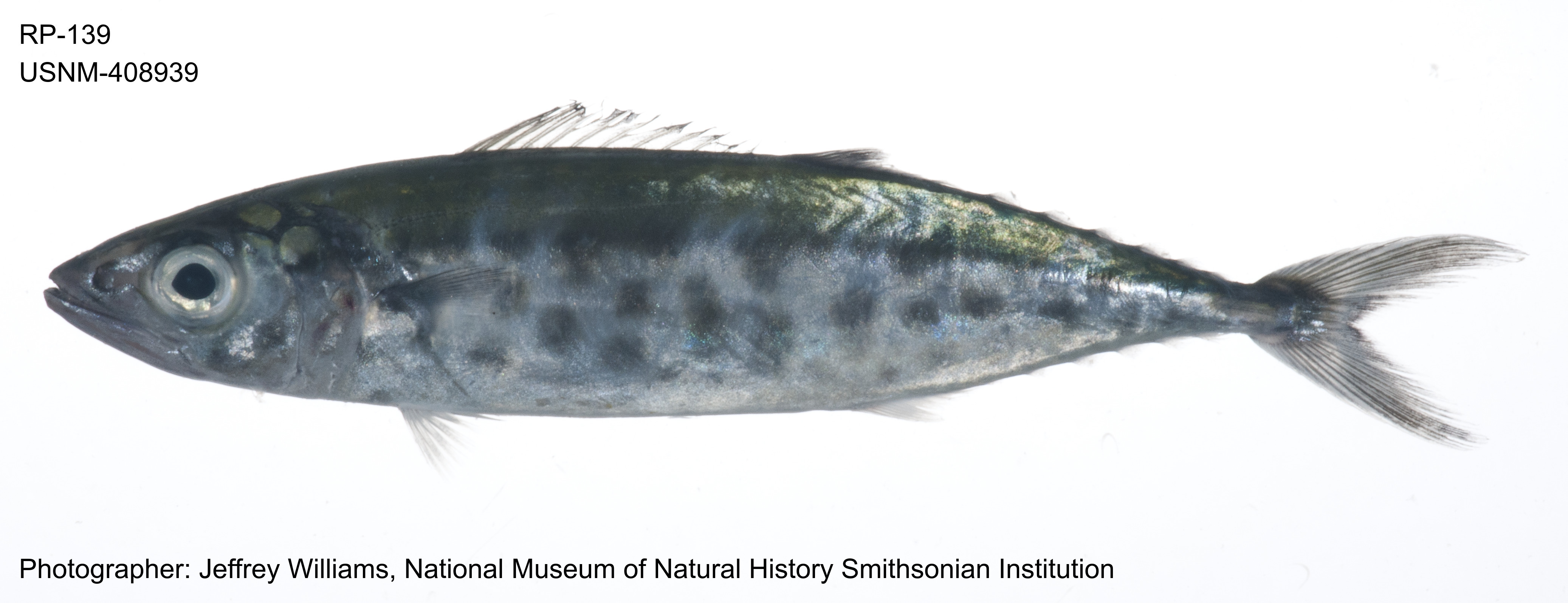
Juvenile with a spotted pattern

Grammatorcynus bilineatus can reach a maximum length of about 100 centimetres (39 in), with a common length of about 50 centimetres (20 in) and maximum weight of about 3.5 kilograms (7.7 lb).

This species is often confused with its sister species Grammatorcynus bicarinatus, the shark mackerel. They can be differentiated as the double-lined lacks spots on its belly, is generally smaller, and the eyes are larger.

== Range ==
Double-lined mackerel are present in the tropical and subtropical Indo-Pacific, from the Red Sea to the Andaman Sea, also from the northern coast of Australia to the Ryukyu Islands, as far as Fiji

== Biology and ecology ==
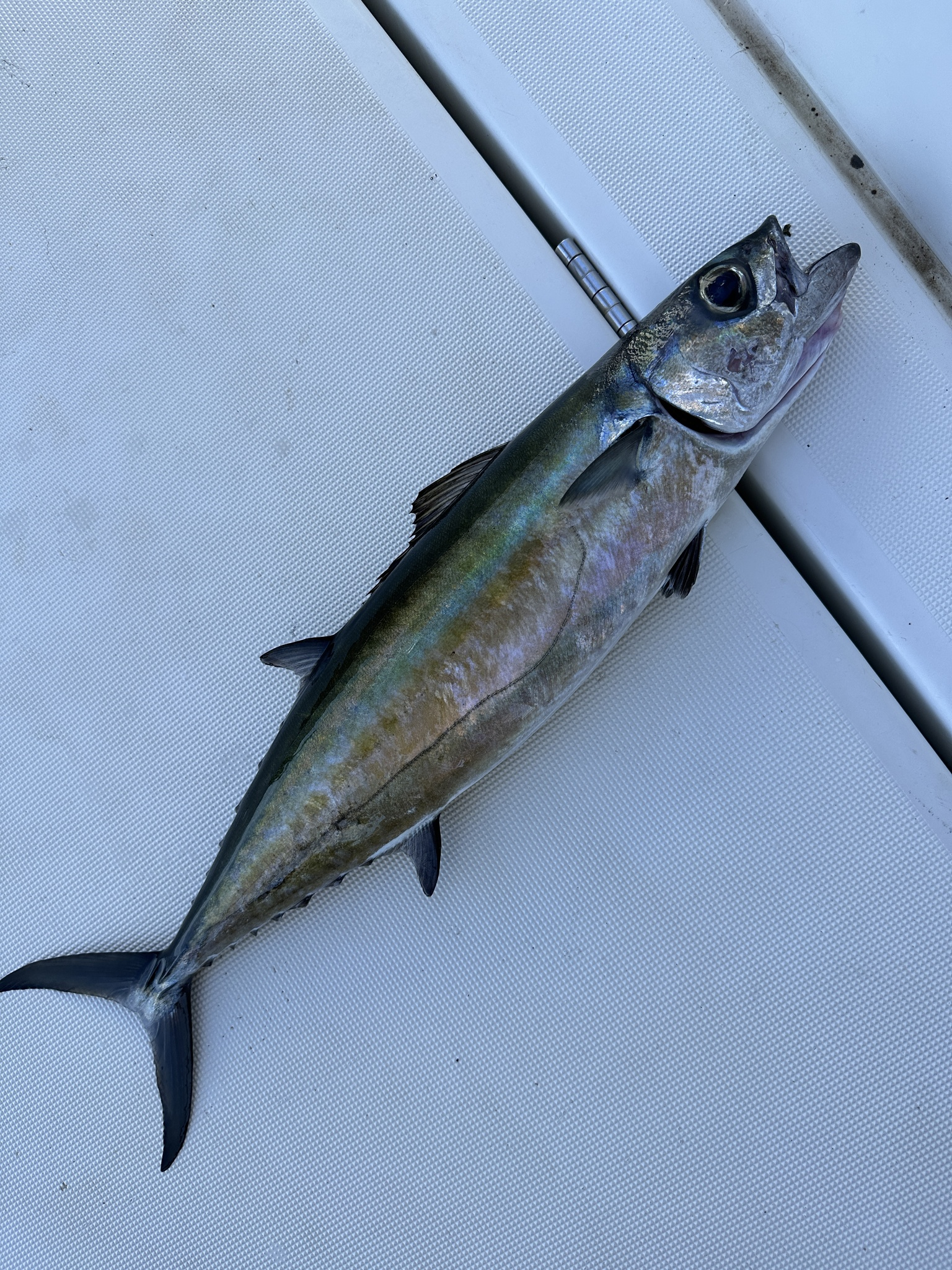
Recently caught specimen from Tuvalu

These subtropical reef-associated and pelagic fishes usually inhabit open water, but they are mostly found in shallow waters at depths of 15–50 m (49–164 ft).

Grammatorcynus bilineatus mainly feed on crustaceans and fishes, especially Clupeiformes (Sardinella and Thryssa species), but also other fishes such as triggerfishes (Balistes) and small barracudas (Sphyraena). It usually forms large schools.

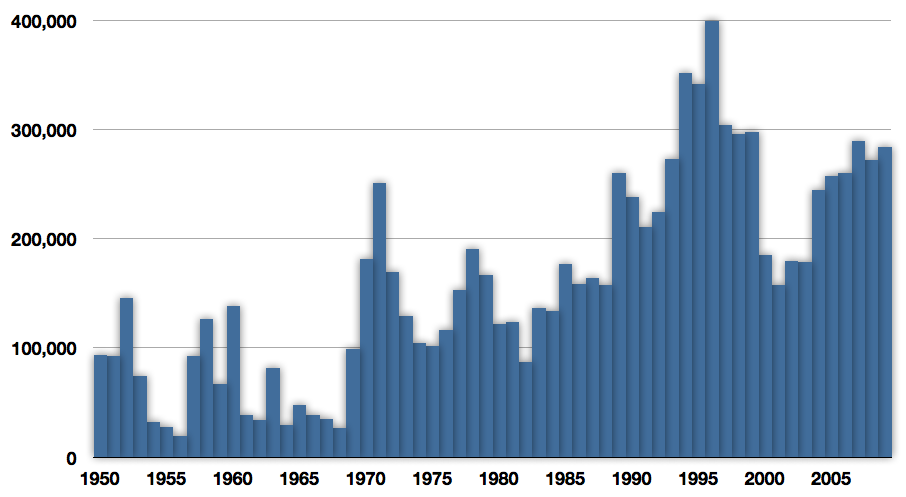
Catch statistics by year

== Fisheries ==
The double-lined mackerel is a commercial fish, usually marketed canned and frozen.

It is of minor importance to commercial fisheries.

== See also ==
- Mackerel as food

== Bibliography ==
- Fenner, Robert M.: The Conscientious Marine Aquarist. Neptune City, USA: T.F.H. Publications, 2001.
- Helfman, G., B. Collette y D. Facey: The diversity of fishes. Blackwell Science, Malden, Massachusetts, USA, 1997
- Hoese, D.F. 1986: . A M.M. Smith y P.C. Heemstra (eds.) Smiths' sea fishes. Springer-Verlag, Berlín.
- Maugé, L.A. 1986. A J. Daget, J.-P. Gosse y D.F.E. Thys van den Audenaerde (eds.) Check-list of the freshwater fishes of África. Vol. 2.
- Moyle, P. y J. Cech.: Fishes: An Introduction to Ichthyology, 4th. ed, Upper Saddle River, USA - Prentice-Hall. 2000.
- Nelson, J.: Fishes of the World, 3rd ed.USA: John Wiley and Sons. 1994.
- Wheeler, A.: The World Encyclopedia of Fishes, 2nd. Ed. London: Macdonald. 1985.
