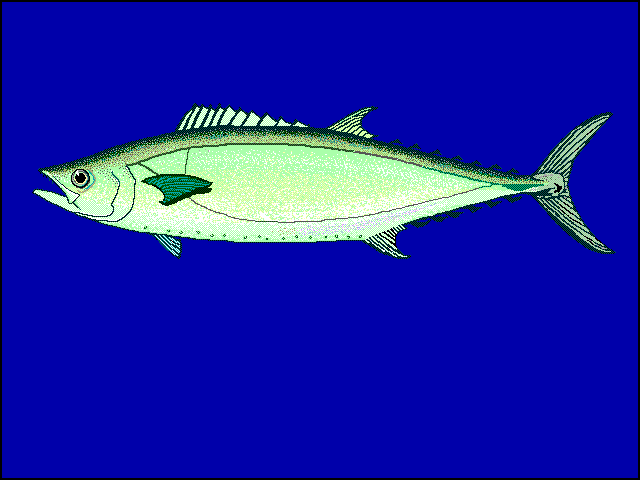
- Shark mackerel (Grammatorcynus bicarinatus)

Scientific classification
- Domain: Eukaryota
- Kingdom: Animalia
- Phylum: Chordata
- Class: Actinopterygii
- Order: Scombriformes
- Family: Scombridae
- Subfamily: Scombrinae
- Tribe: Scomberomorini
- Genus: Grammatorcynus; Gill, 1862

Type species
- Thynnus bilineatus Rüppell 1836

Species
- Grammatorcynus bicarinatus (Quoy & Gaimard, 1825); Grammatorcynus bilineatus (Rüppell, 1836)

= Grammatorcynus =

Genus of fishes

Grammatorcynus is a genus of ray-finned bony fish in the family Scombridae. This genus together with Acanthocybium and Scomberomorus are comprised by the tribe Scomberomorini, commonly known as the Spanish mackerels or seerfishes.

== Species ==
Grammatorcynus comprises two species:

- Grammatorcynus bicarinatus (Quoy & Gaimard, 1825), shark mackerel
- Grammatorcynus bilineatus (Rüppell, 1836), double-lined mackerel

== See also ==
- List of prehistoric bony fish
- Mackerel as food
