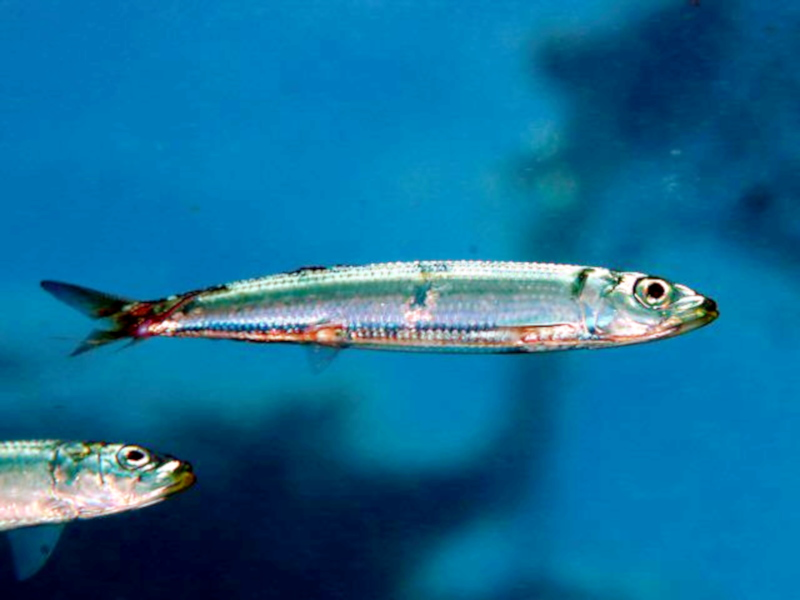
- Etrumeus sadina

Scientific classification
- Domain: Eukaryota
- Kingdom: Animalia
- Phylum: Chordata
- Class: Actinopterygii
- Order: Clupeiformes
- Family: Dussumieriidae
- Genus: Etrumeus; Bleeker, 1853

= Etrumeus =

Genus of fishes

Etrumeus is a genus of round herrings in the family, Dussumieriidae. They are found in Indo-Pacific and Atlantic.

== Species ==
There are currently seven recognized species in this genus:

- Etrumeus acuminatus Gilbert, 1890 (Eastern Pacific red-eye round herring)
- Etrumeus golanii DiBattista, J. E. Randall & Bowen, 2012
- Etrumeus makiawa J. E. Randall & DiBattista, 2012
- Etrumeus micropus (Temminck & Schlegel, 1846)
- Etrumeus sadina (Mitchill, 1814) (Atlantic red-eye round herring)
- Etrumeus whiteheadi Wongratana, 1983 (Whitehead's round herring)
- Etrumeus wongratanai DiBattista, J. E. Randall & Bowen, 2012
