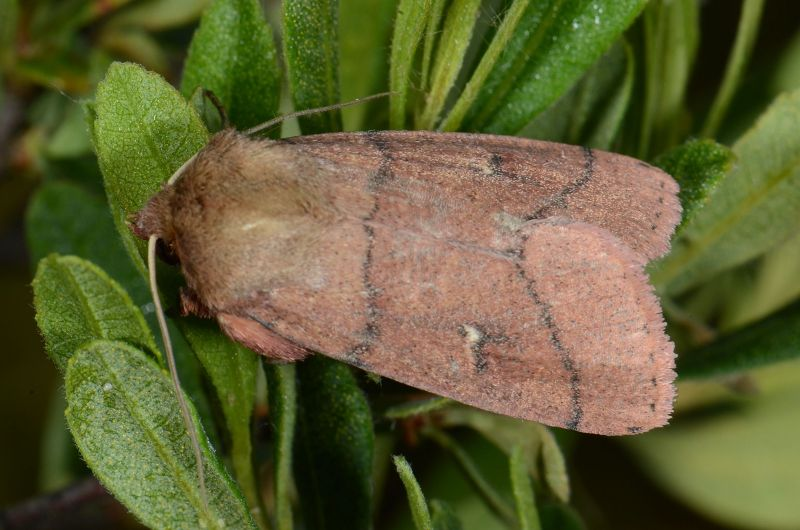

Scientific classification
- Kingdom: Animalia
- Phylum: Arthropoda
- Class: Insecta
- Order: Lepidoptera
- Superfamily: Noctuoidea
- Family: Noctuidae
- Genus: Mythimna
- Species: M. turca

Binomial name
- Mythimna turca (Linnaeus, 1761)

= Mythimna turca =

Double line

Species of moth

Mythimna turca, the double line, is a moth of the family Noctuidae. The species was first described by Carl Linnaeus in 1761. It is found in Europe. The eastern expansion extends through northern Asia and central Asia to northern China, Korea and Japan. It rises to a height of about 700 metres in the Alps.

== Technical description and variation ==
The wingspan is 37–45 mm. Forewing pale rufous ochreous, dappled throughout with rufous fuscous, and very finely dusted with small black dots; inner and outer lines dark, conversely oblique; reniform stigma alone represented, forming a pale streak on the discocellular, the lower end whiter, followed by a slight dark cloud; hindwing rufous, suffused in varying degrees with fuscous; - the form limbata Btlr. from Japan generally has the inner line of forewing more strongly angled beneath costa, while the legs are more heavily tufted; — ab. turcella Stgr. from Transbaikal is smaller and paler. See also Hacker et al.

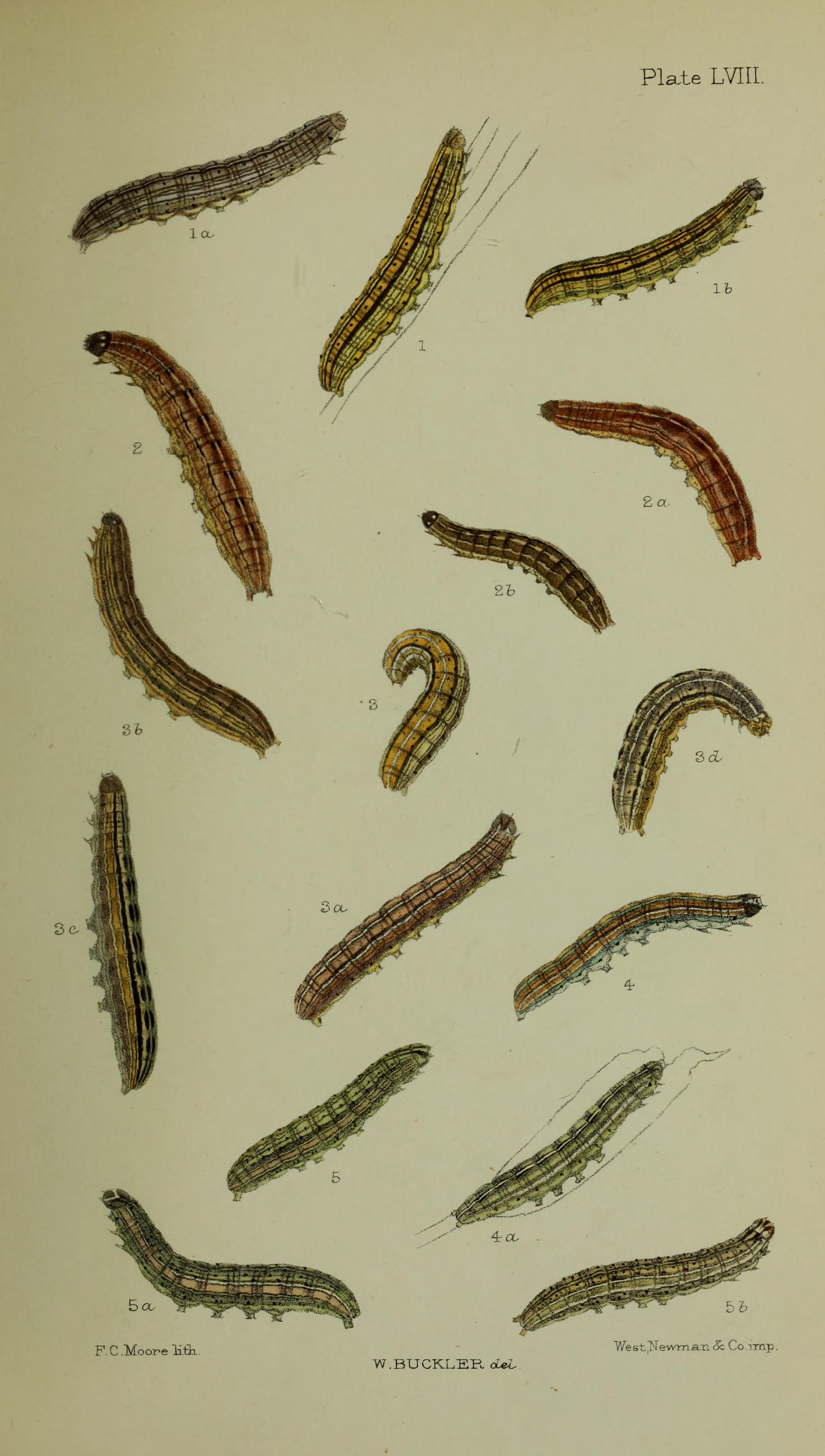
Figs 2, 2a, 2b larvae after final moult

== Biology ==
The species mainly colonizes moorland and carr, moist meadows and forest clearings as well as raised bog areas.

The moth flies from June to July depending on the location.

Larva yellowish grey, mottled with darker, especially in front; dorsal and subdorsal lines pale ochreous; a dorsal series of dark streaks; spiracles with black rings. The larvae feed on various grasses, including Dactylis glomerata, Poa nemoralis and Luzula species.
