= Propteridium =

Propteridium Temporal range: Early Oligocene

Scientific classification
- Domain: Eukaryota
- Kingdom: Animalia
- Phylum: Chordata
- Class: Actinopterygii
- Order: Ophidiiformes
- Genus: †Propteridium; Arambourg, 1967

Extinct genus of fishes

Propteridium is an extinct genus of prehistoric bony fish that lived during the early Oligocene epoch.
