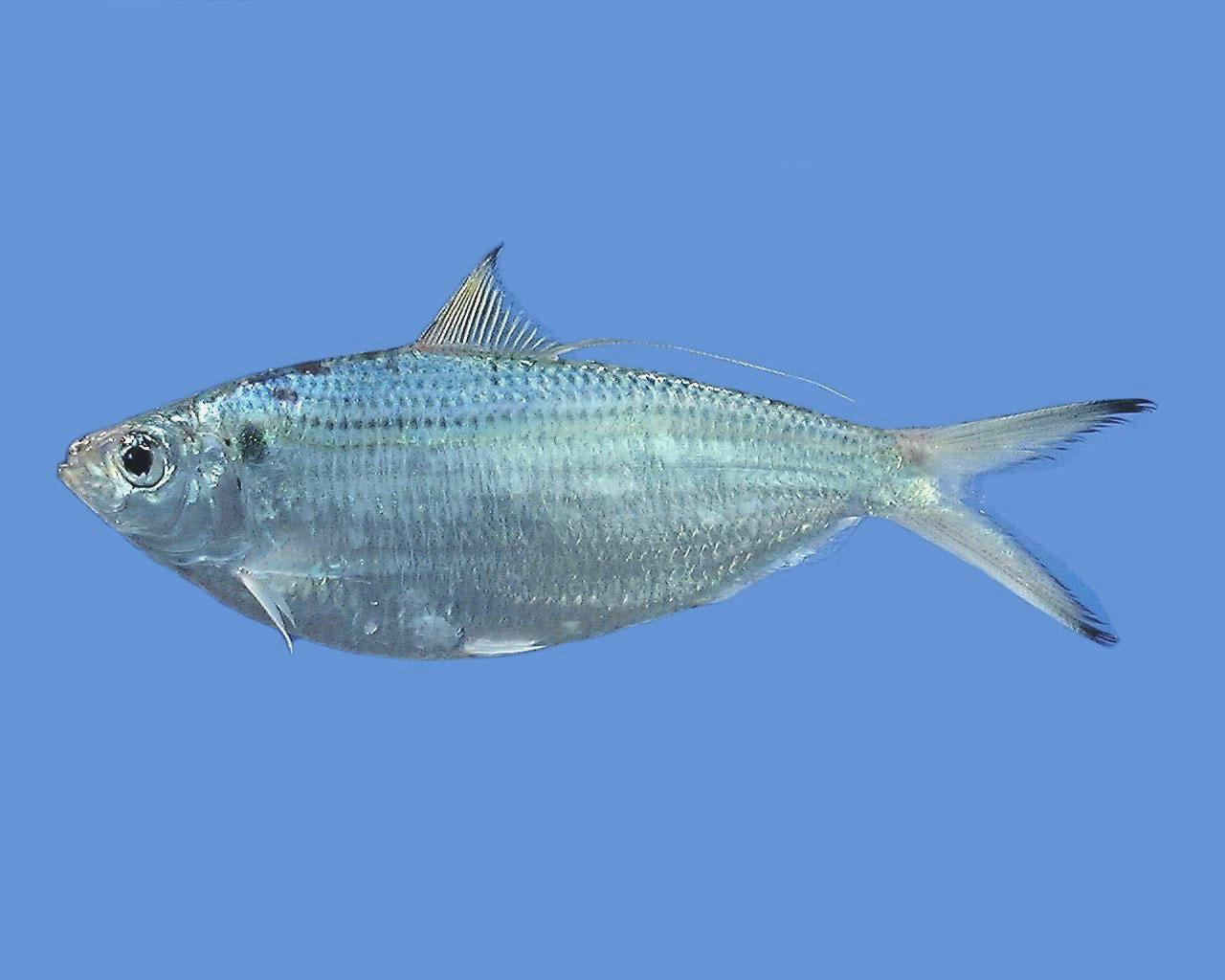
- Opisthonema oglinum (Atlantic thread herring)

Scientific classification
- Domain: Eukaryota
- Kingdom: Animalia
- Phylum: Chordata
- Class: Actinopterygii
- Order: Clupeiformes
- Suborder: Clupeoidei
- Family: Dorosomatidae
- Genus: Opisthonema; T. N. Gill, 1861

Type species
- Opisthonema thrissa Gill, 1861

Synonyms
- Filialosa Fowler, 1944

= Opisthonema =

Genus of herrings from the tropical waters of the Western Hemisphere

Opisthonema is a genus of herrings, the thread herrings, found in tropical waters of the Western Hemisphere. They get their name from a filamentous nature of the last ray of the dorsal fin. Currently, five species are in this genus.

== Species ==
- Opisthonema berlangai Berry & Barrett, 1963 (Galapagos thread herring)
- Opisthonema bulleri (Regan, 1904) (slender thread herring)
- Opisthonema libertate (Günther, 1867) (Pacific thread herring)
- Opisthonema medirastre Berry & Barrett, 1963 (middling thread herring)
- Opisthonema oglinum (Lesueur, 1818) (Atlantic thread herring)
