= Asmari Formation =

Geological formation in western Iran

The Asmari Formation is a geological formation in western Iran. Located in the western Zagros Mountains, it is a carbonate formation that largely consists of limestone, dolomitic limestone, dolomite, and marly limestone. There are also smaller amounts of anhydrite, lithic sandstone, and limey sandstone. The formation dates to the Oligocene and Miocene periods and is a major hydrocarbon reserve. It has been producing oil since the 1930s. It also forms a major aquifer, which discharges at various springs in the Zagros region.

The Asmari Formation's basic biostratigraphy was established in the 1950s and it was formally described in 1965. It consists of carbonate platforms that were formed in 6 distinct stages. The formation is named after the Asmari Mountains southeast of Masjed Soleyman, and its type sample was taken from the Tang-e Gel Torsh in these mountains.

The Asmari Formation was deposited at a time when the Tethys Ocean was finally closing and the Zagros Mountains were first rising. During this period, the region was a shallow ocean gradually getting less deep. By the time of the succeeding Gachsaran Formation, this process had culminated in the sea shrinking to lagoons.

In the southwestern Zagros, the Asmari Formation sits on top of the Pabdeh Formation. In the Fars and Luristan regions, the Asmari Formation sits on top of the Jahrum and Shahbazan Formations. The Asmari Formation is thickest in the northeastern part of the Dezful Embayment.

The formation has various microfossils including planktonic foraminifera, echinoids, red algae, ostracoda, and oncoids. Individual species include Globigerina, Turborotalia cerroazulensis, Hantkenina, Nummulites, Lepidocyclina, Miogypsina, Elphidium, Peneroplis farsenensis, and Borelis melo curdica and Borelis melo melo.

== See also ==
- Geology of Iran
- Zagros fold and thrust belt
