= Pacific thread herring =

Conservation status
- Least Concern (IUCN 3.1)

Scientific classification
- Kingdom: Animalia
- Phylum: Chordata
- Class: Actinopterygii
- Order: Clupeiformes
- Family: Dorosomatidae
- Genus: Opisthonema
- Species: O. libertate

Binomial name
- Opisthonema libertate (Günther, 1867)

Species of fish

The Pacific thread herring or deep-bodied Pacific thread herring (Opisthonema libertate) is a herring-like fish in the family Clupeidae. It is found in the Eastern Pacific. It can grow to 30 cm (12 in) total length.
