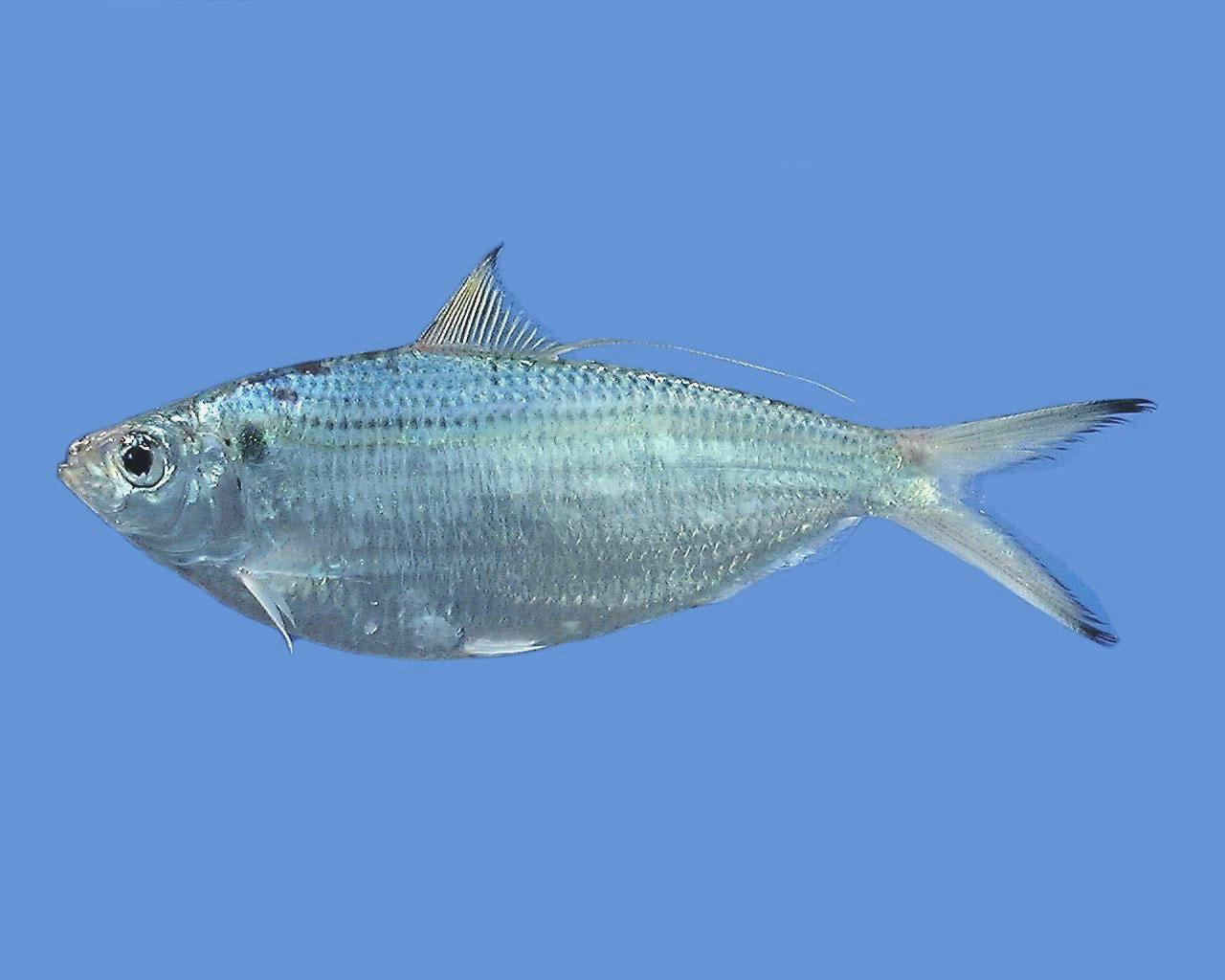

Conservation status
- Least Concern (IUCN 3.1)

Scientific classification
- Kingdom: Animalia
- Phylum: Chordata
- Class: Actinopterygii
- Division: Teleostei
- Order: Clupeiformes
- Family: Dorosomatidae
- Genus: Opisthonema
- Species: O. oglinum

Binomial name
- Opisthonema oglinum (Lesueur, 1818)

= Atlantic thread herring =

Species of fish

The Atlantic thread herring (Opisthonema oglinum) is a herring-like fish in the family Clupeidae.

It has a dark blue-gray back, silvery sides, a white belly, and a small head. It grows up to 38 cm in length. It can be found in shallow waters and harbors along the coasts of the western Atlantic Ocean, from Cape Cod south to Brazil, including the Gulf of Mexico. It feeds mainly on plankton, but also takes small fish and crustaceans.

It is confused with the scaled sardine, Harengula jaguana, by anglers.

== Relationship with humans ==
=== Cuisine ===
Atlantic thread herring has a slightly milder taste than most species of herring; it can be served raw, pickled, or cooked.

=== Recreational fishery ===
They are taken by anglers for use as bait or for personal consumption.
