= Mackerel as food =

Raw Atlantic mackerel
Nutritional value per 100 g (3.5 oz)
- Energy: 858 kJ (205 kcal)
- Fat: 13.89 g
- Protein: 18.60 g
Vitamins and minerals
| Vitamins | Quantity %DV^{†} |
| Vitamin A | 167 IU |
| Vitamin D | 80% 643 IU |
| Minerals | Quantity %DV^{†} |
| Calcium | 1% 12 mg |
| Iron | 9% 1.63 mg |
| Magnesium | 18% 76 mg |
| Phosphorus | 17% 217 mg |
| Potassium | 10% 314 mg |
| Sodium | 4% 90 mg |
| Zinc | 6% 0.63 mg |
- Other constituents: Quantity
- Water: 63.55 g
- Link to USDA database entry
- ^{†}Percentages estimated using US recommendations for adults, except for potassium, which is estimated based on expert recommendation from the National Academies.

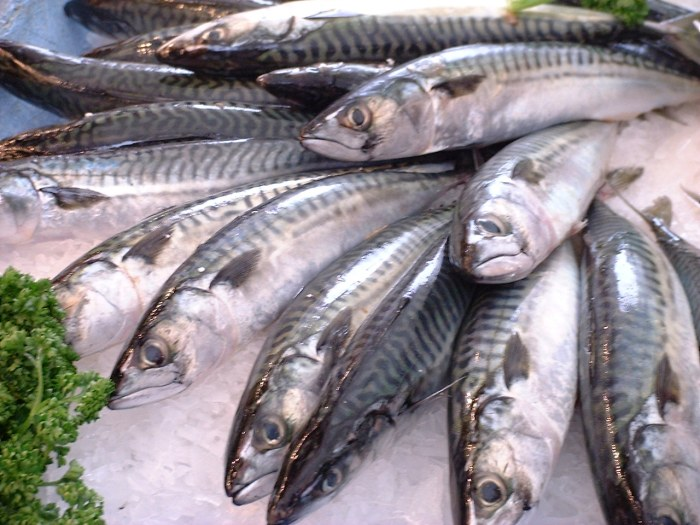
Atlantic mackerel on ice in a fish shop.

Mackerel is an important food fish that is consumed worldwide. As an oily fish, it is a rich source of omega-3 fatty acids. The flesh of mackerel spoils quickly, especially in the tropics, and can cause scombroid food poisoning. Accordingly, it should be eaten on the day of capture, unless properly refrigerated or cured.

== Preservation ==
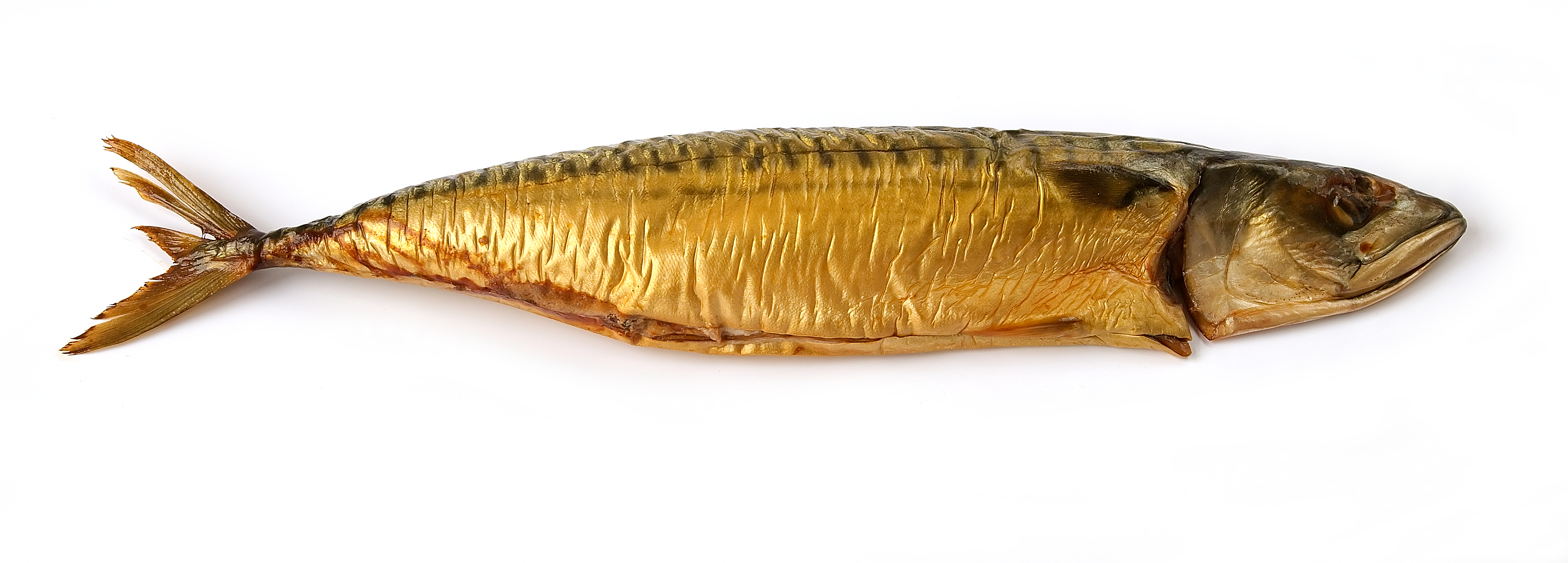
Smoked mackerel

Mackerel is highly perishable and was historically difficult to preserve. Before the 19th-century development of canning and the widespread availability of refrigeration, salting and smoking were the principal preservation methods available. Historically in England, this fish was not preserved, but was consumed only in its fresh form. Spoilage was common, leading the authors of The Cambridge Economic History of Europe to remark: "There are more references to stinking mackerel in English literature than to any other fish!" In France, mackerel was traditionally pickled with large amounts of salt, which allowed it to be sold widely in the country.

In Japan, mackerel is called saba, and is commonly cured with salt and vinegar to make a type of sushi known as saba-zushi. Historically, saba-zushi originated in Kyoto as a solution for transporting mackerel to the inland city, which otherwise would not have made the journey from the coast still fresh. The road linking Obama bay and Kyoto is now also called "mackerel road" (saba-kaido).

Modern canning allowed mackerel, like many other fish, to be safely stored for long periods without refrigeration, and packed in a variety of sauces. This is due to high temperature processing, where fresh cleaned mackerel is first immersed in a liquid such as a brine, water or vinegar solution, and sauces can be added before sealing off the mixture in an airtight container. The fish then undergoes heat sterilisation at high temperatures to eliminate micro-organisms and bacteria that causes spoilage and the container is later cooled, which creates a vacuum seal that prevents air from entering and spoiling the fish. As a result, canned mackerel can be stored safely at room temperature for months or years. The bones in canned mackerel fillets are generally safe to consume as they soften significantly during the curing and are a good source of calcium. It is also high in omega-3, in which tends to be better preserved when the mackerel is packed in oil, rather than spring water.

== Appeal ==
For many years, mackerel was regarded as unclean in the UK and elsewhere due to folklore which suggested that the fish fed on the corpses of dead sailors. A 1976 survey of housewives in Britain undertaken by the White Fish Authority indicated a reluctance to departing from buying the traditional staples of cod, haddock or salmon. Less than 10% of the survey's 1,931 respondents had ever bought mackerel and only 3% did so regularly. As a result of this trend many UK fishmongers during the 1970s did not display or even stock mackerel.

According to a survey conducted in April 2024 by the Korea Maritime Institute (KMI), mackerel was ranked the "most popular seafood product" among South Koreans (14%), surpassing squid (12.9%). The institute also found in earlier surveys, mackerel was the nation's most preferred seafood species in 2017, 2018 and 2019.

== Mercury ==
There is a large variation in the mercury levels found in mackerel. These levels differ markedly for different species, and even for the same species in different locations; however, the strongest positive correlation seems to be connected to the species' size (the larger species being higher on the food chain). According to the United States Food and Drug Administration, king mackerel is one of four fishes, along with swordfish, shark, and tilefish, that children and pregnant women should avoid due to high levels of methylmercury found in these fish and the consequent risk of mercury poisoning. Atlantic mackerel however is categorized as "Best Choice" for consumption by the FDA, as it is low in mercury and high in Omega-3.

== Gallery ==
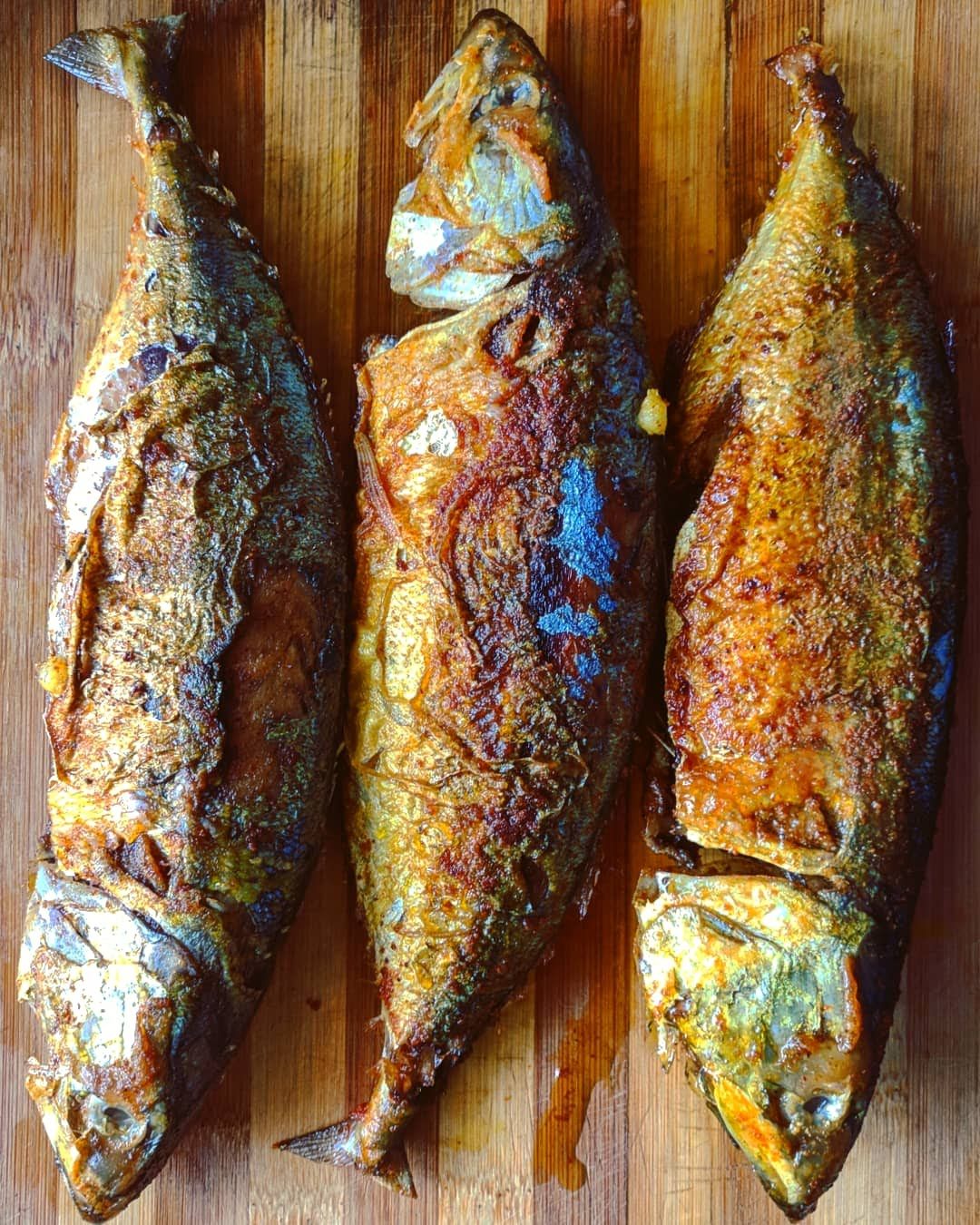
Indian mackerel deep-fried with salt and turmeric in mustard oil

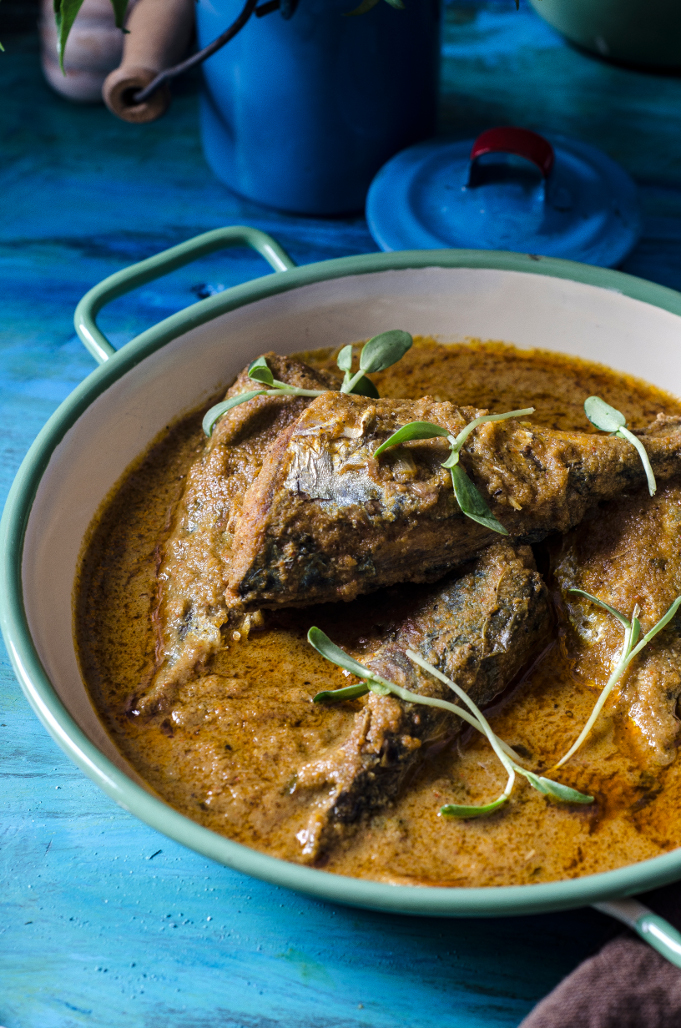
Indian mackerel curry

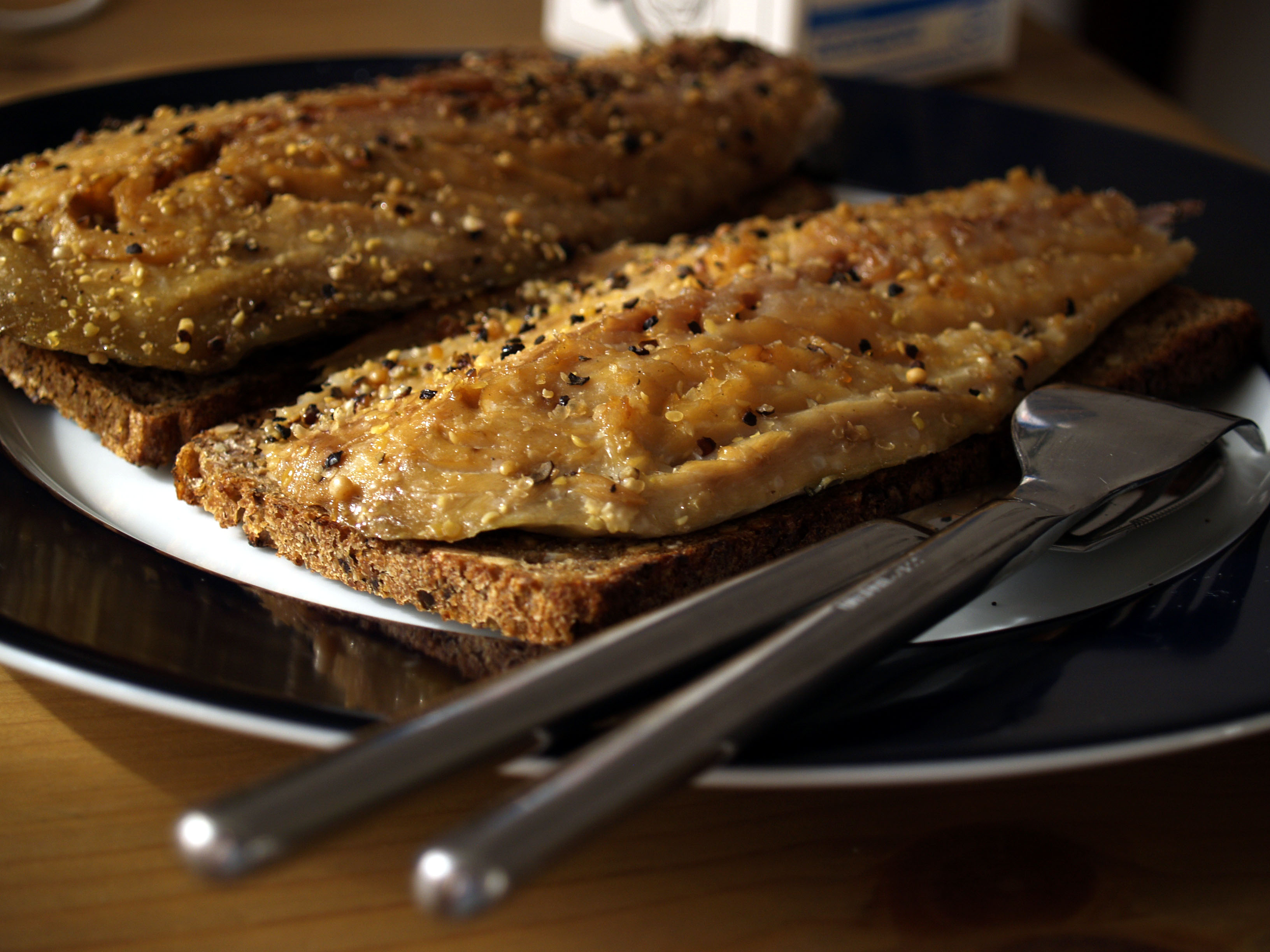
Danish mackerel on rye bread

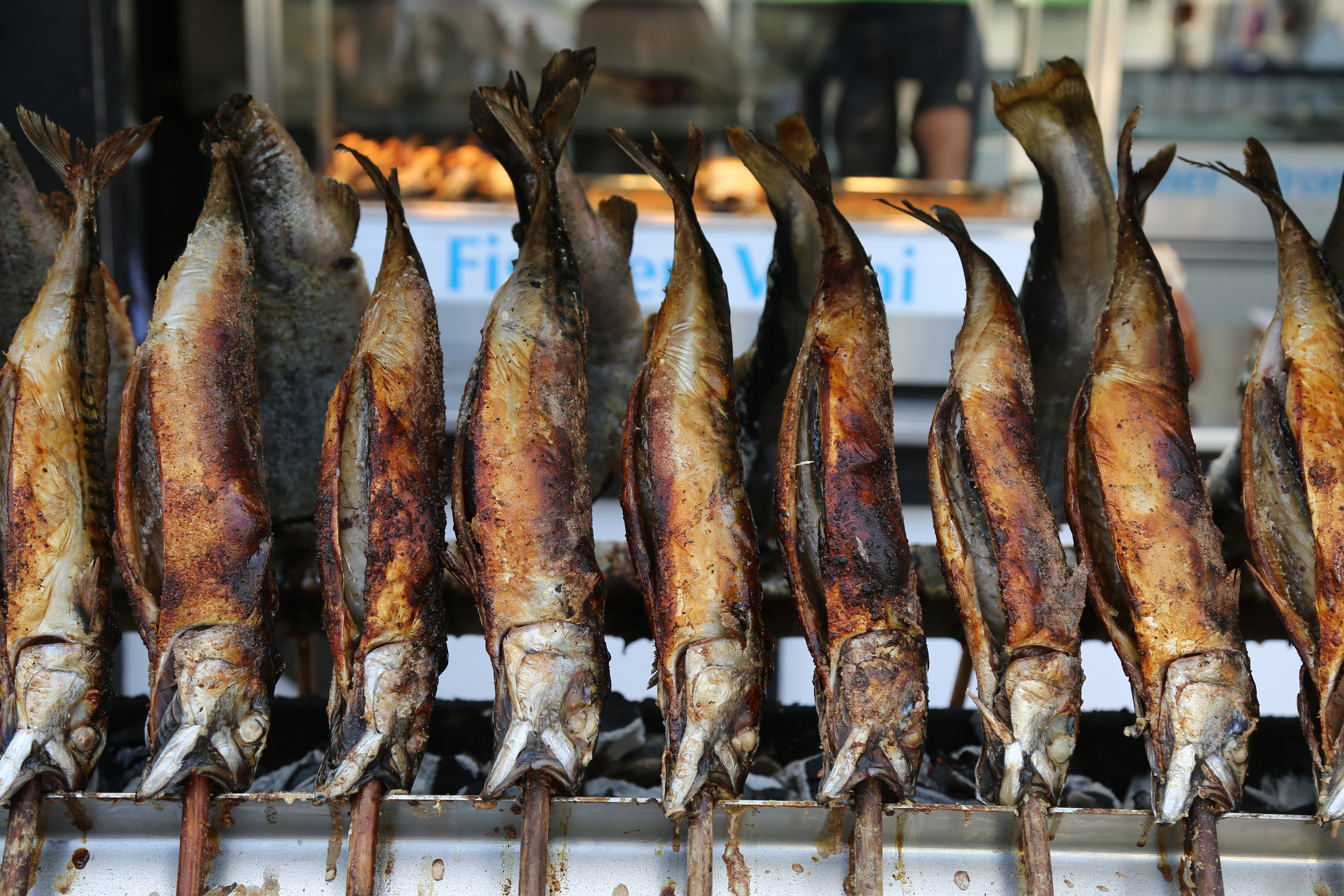
German grilled mackerel at Auer Dult

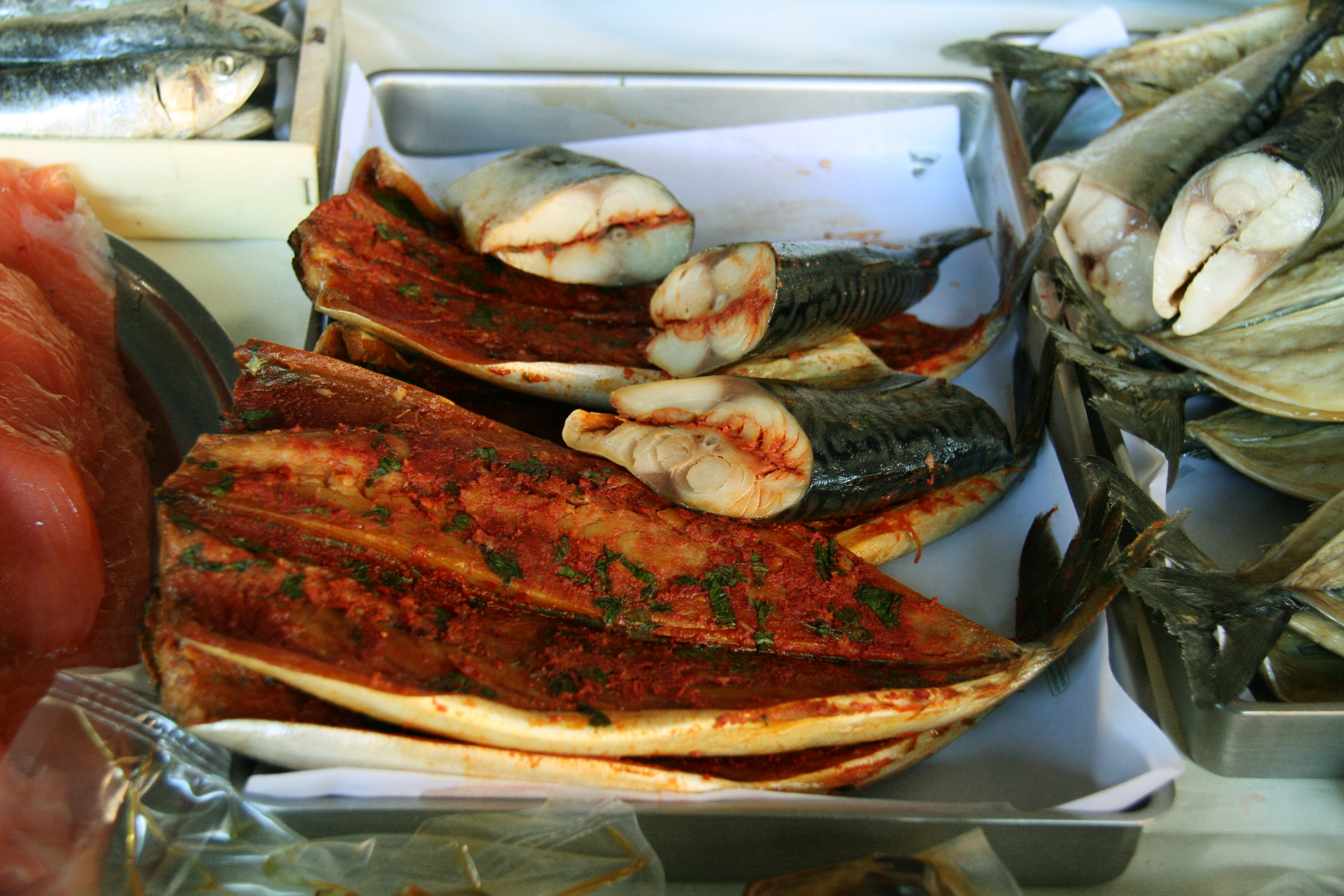
Spanish mackerel escabeche

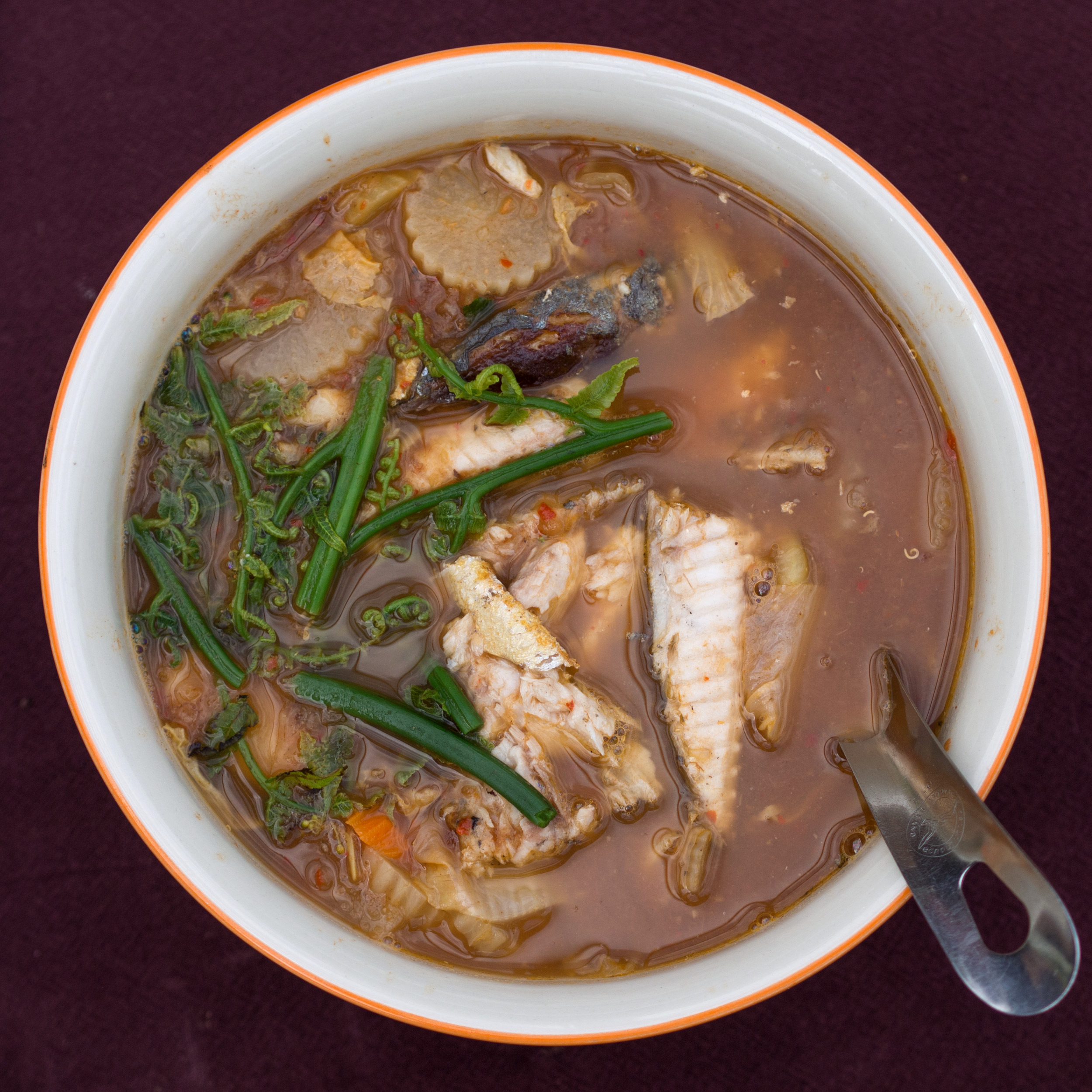
Thai mackerel kaeng som

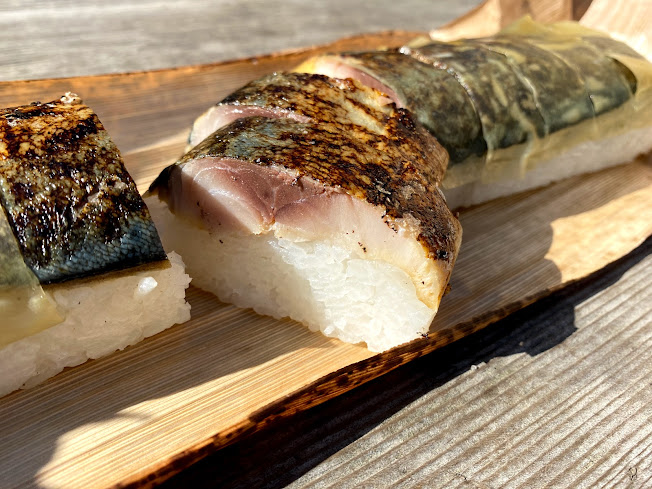
Japanese mackerel sushi

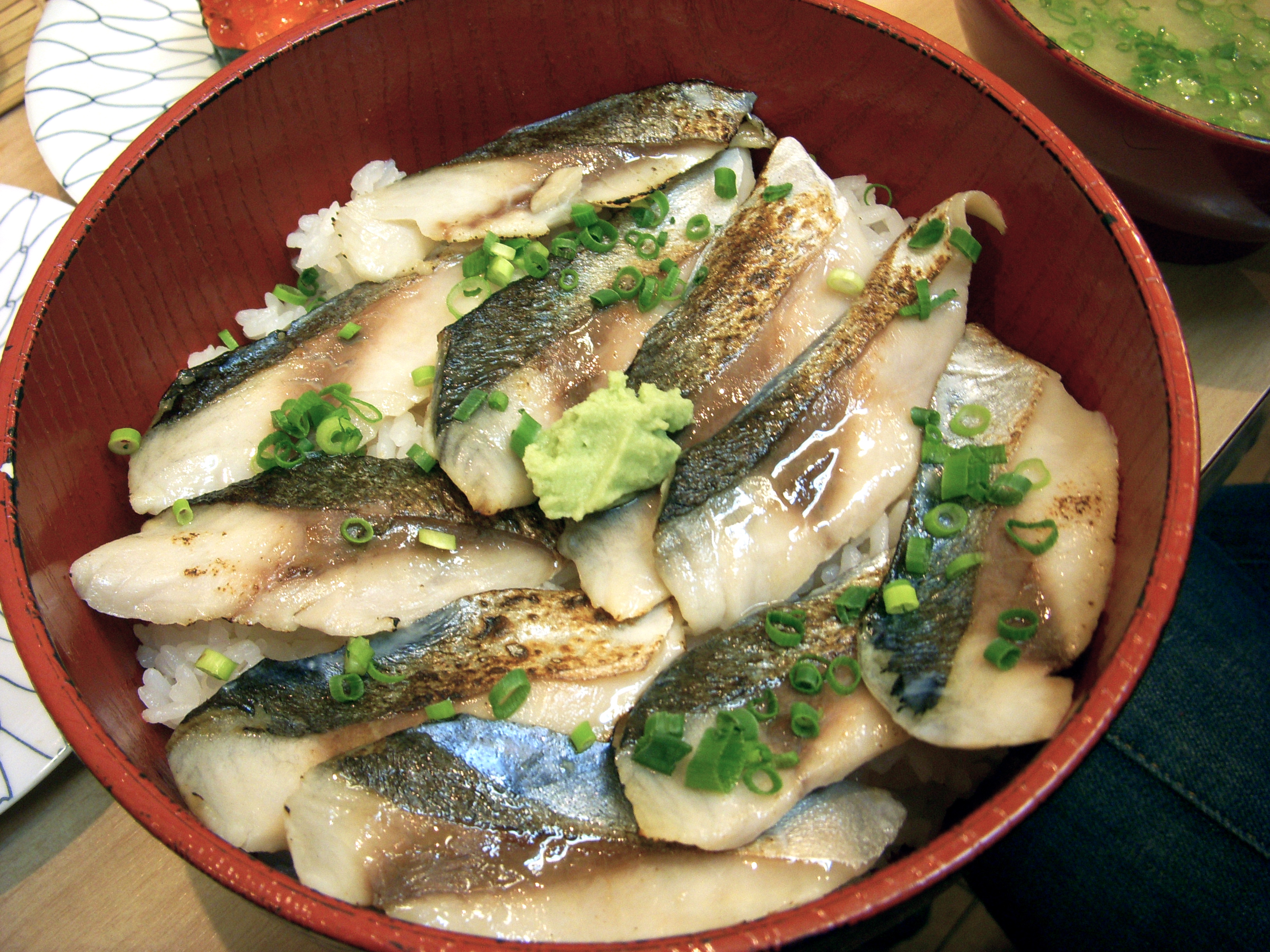
Japanese mackerel donburi

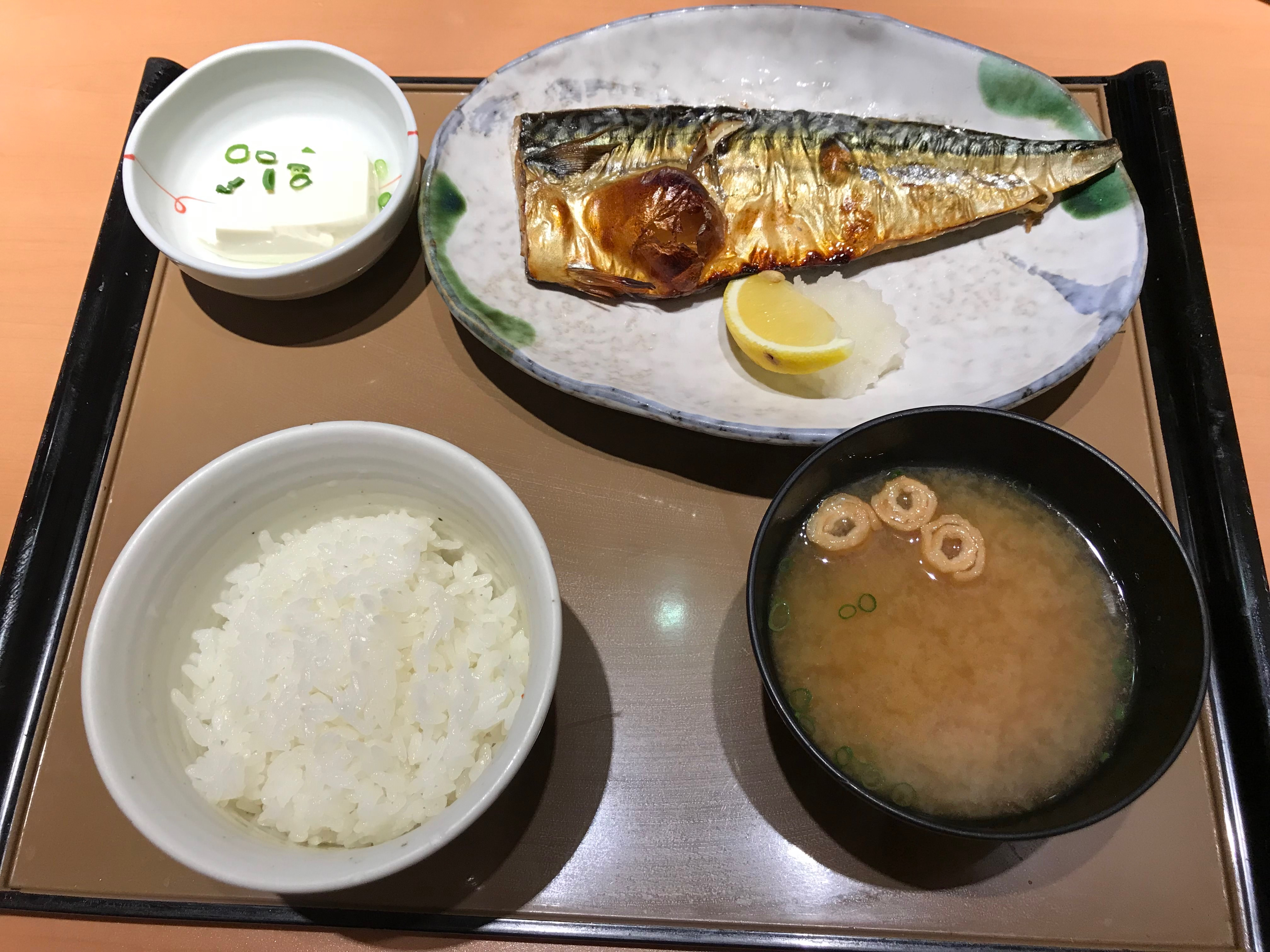
Japanese teishoku meal with grilled mackerel and miso soup
