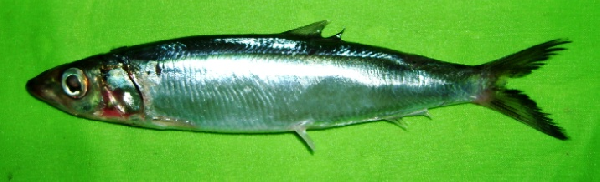
- D. acuta

Scientific classification
- Kingdom: Animalia
- Phylum: Chordata
- Class: Actinopterygii
- Division: Teleostei
- Order: Clupeiformes
- Suborder: Clupeoidei
- Family: Dussumieriidae; Gill, 1861

Genera
- See text

= Dussumieriidae =

Round herrings Temporal range: Ypresian to present Possibly Campanian records

Family of fishes

Dussumieriidae is a family of clupeiform fishes popularly called the "round herrings". It is now recognized by FishBase as a family in its own right; it had been considered to be a subfamily of Clupeidae. It contains two extant genera, and some potential fossil genera. Possibly the earliest record of the group is Nardoclupea from the Campanian of Italy.

The following genera are known:

- Dussumieria Valenciennes, 1847
- Etrumeus Bleeker, 1853
- †Lepidoclupea Calzoni, Giusberti & Carnevale, 2026 (Early Eocene of Italy)
- †Paretrumeus Daniltshenko, 1980 (Oligocene of North Caucasus, Russia)

Putative fossil genera include:

- †?Portoselvaggioclupea Taverne, 2007 (Late Cretaceous of Italy)
- †?Pseudoetringus David, 1946 (Late Eocene of California)

The Eocene genus †Trollichthys, originally described in this family, has since been found to be a spratelloidid, while the Late Cretaceous Nardoclupea, also initially described in this family, has been found to be an early-diverging crown group-clupeoid.
