= List of Lessepsian migrant species =

Lessepsian migrants, named after Ferdinand de Lesseps, the French engineer in charge of the Suez Canal's construction, are marine species that are native to the waters on one side of the Suez Canal, and which have been introduced by passage through the canal to the waters on its other side, giving rise to new colonies there and often becoming invasive.

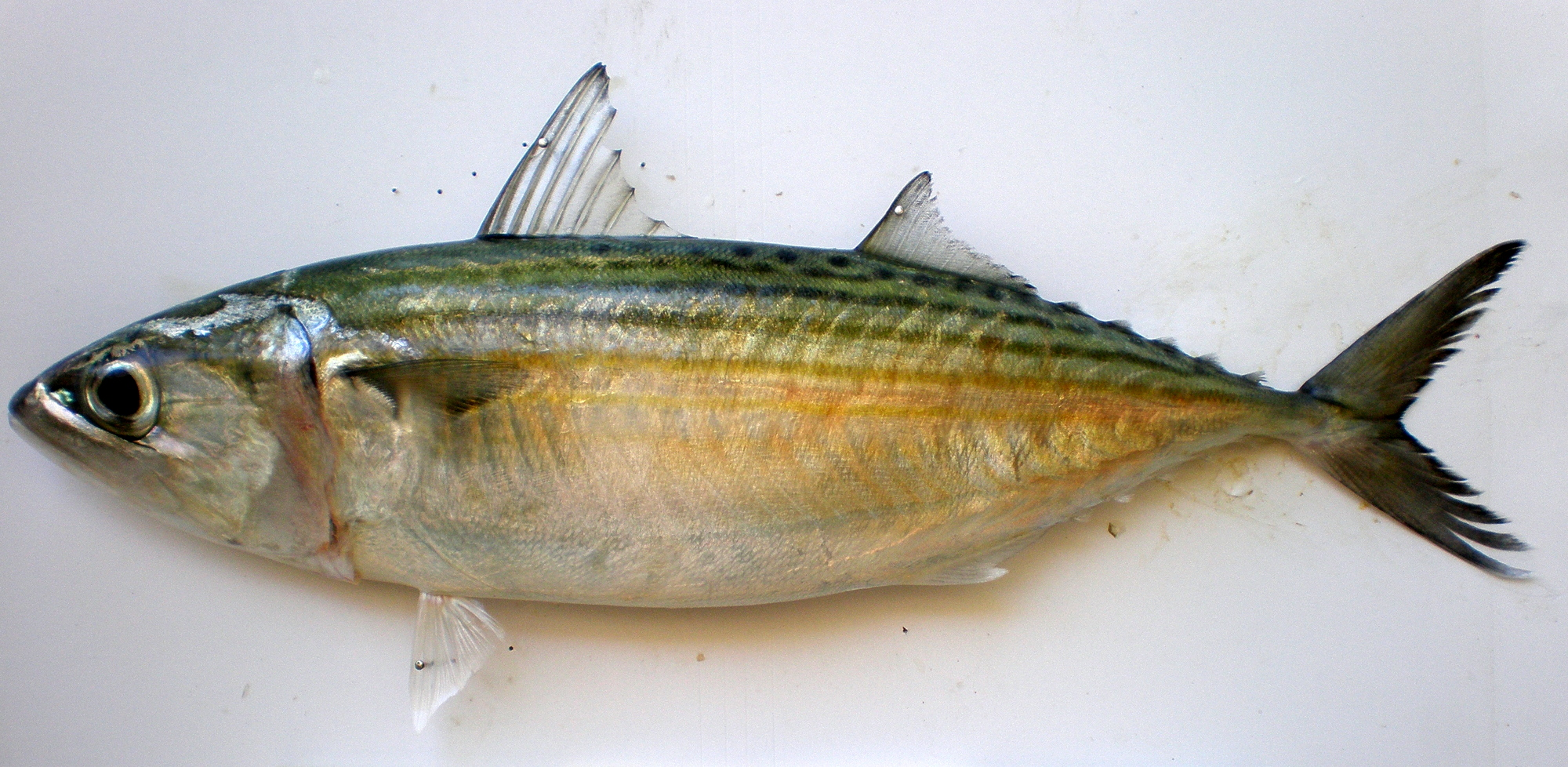
The Indian mackerel, Rastrelliger kanagurta, an example of Lessepsian migrant

Most Lessepsian migrations are of Red Sea species invading the Mediterranean Sea; few occur in the opposite direction.

== Red Sea species to Mediterranean Sea ==
The year given denotes the first record in the Mediterranean (often distinct from the year of publication).

Species	Group	Year	Ref.
Acanthurus sohal	Actinopterygii: Acanthuridae	2022	
Acanthurus xanthopterus	Actinopterygii: Acanthuridae	2022	
Actaea savignii	Crustacea: Xanthidae	2010	
Alepes djedaba	Actinopterygii: Carangidae	1927	
Alepes kleinii	Actinopterygii: Carangidae	1966	
Alpheus edwardsii	Crustacea: Alpheidae	1924	
Alpheus inopinatus	Crustacea: Alpheidae	1936	
Alpheus rapacida	Crustacea: Alpheidae	1964	
Apogonichthyoides pharaonis	Actinopterygii: Apogonidae	1947	
Aquilonastra burtoni	Echinodermata: Asterinidae	1966	
Arcuatula arcuatula	Mollusca: Mytilidae		
Arcuatula perfragilis	Mollusca: Mytilidae	1960	
Arcuatula senhousia	Mollusca: Mytilidae	2004	
Ashtoret lunaris	Crustacea: Matutidae	1987	
Aspidosiphon elegans	Phascolosomatidea: Aspidosiphonidae	1957	
Atergatis roseus	Crustacea: Xanthidae	1961	
Atherinomorus lacunosus	Actinopterygii: Atherinidae	1902	
Belzebub hanseni	Crustacea: Luciferidae	1924	
Brachidontes pharaonis	Mollusca: Mytilidae	1876	
Caesio varilineata	Actinopterygii: Caesionidae	2018	
Callionymus filamentosus	Actinopterygii: Callionymidae	1953	
Caloria indica	Mollusca: Facelinidae	1986	
Carcharhinus melanopterus	Chondrichthyes: Carcharhinidae	2005	
Carupa tenuipes	Crustacea: Portunidae	1996	
Champsodon capensis	Actinopterygii: Champsodontidae	2012	
Champsodon nudivittis	Actinopterygii: Champsodontidae	2008	
Champsodon vorax	Actinopterygii: Champsodontidae	2010	
Chaetodon austriacus	Actinopterygii: Chaetodontidae	2011	
Chaetodon larvatus	Actinopterygii: Chaetodontidae	2011	
Charybdis hellerii	Crustacea: Portunidae	1924	
Charybdis longicollis	Crustacea: Portunidae	1959	
Cheilodipterus novemstriatus	Actinopterygii: Apogonidae	2010	
Conus arenatus	Mollusca: Conidae		
Crenidens crenidens	Actinopterygii: Sparidae	1970	
Cryptocentrus caeruleopunctatus	Actinopterygii: Gobiidae	2015	
Cymothoa indica	Crustacea: Cymothoidae	2009	
Cucurbitula cymbium	Mollusca: Gastrochaenidae		
Decapterus russelli	Actinopterygii: Carangidae	2005	
Diodora ruppellii	Mollusca: Fissurellidae		
Dussumieria acuta	Actinopterygii: Clupeidae	1953	
Encrasicholina gloria	Actinopterygii: Engraulidae	2014	
Epinephelus areolatus	Actinopterygii: Serranidae	2016	
Epinephelus coioides	Actinopterygii: Serranidae	1969	
Epinephelus fasciatus	Actinopterygii: Serranidae	2012	
Epinephelus geoffroyi	Actinopterygii: Serranidae	2015	
Equulites popei	Actinopterygii: Leiognathidae	2011	
Equulites klunzingeri	Actinopterygii: Leiognathidae	1931	
Eucrate crenata	Crustacea: Goneplacidae	1924	
Fenneropenaeus indica	Crustacea: Penaeidae	1981	
Ferosagitta galerita	Chaetognatha: Sagittidae	2003	
Fistularia commersonii	Actinopterygii: Fistulariidae	2000	
Fulvia fragilis	Mollusca: Cardiidae	2005	
Gafrarium pectinatum	Mollusca: Veneridae		
Goniobranchus annulatus	Mollusca: Chromodorididae	2004	
Hemiramphus far	Actinopterygii: Hemiramphidae	1927	
Heniochus intermedius	Actinopterygii: Chaetodontidae	2003	
Herklotsichthys punctatus	Actinopterygii: Clupeidae	1943	
Heterosaccus dollfusi	Crustacea: Sacculinidae	1992	
Himantura uarnak	Chondrichthyes: Dasyatidae	1955	
Hippocampus fuscus	Actinopterygii: Syngnathidae	2001	
Hyastenus hilgendorfi	Crustacea: Epialtidae	1960	
Hyporhamphus affinis	Actinopterygii: Hemiramphidae	1964	
Ixa monodi	Crustacea: Leucosiidae	1955	
Jaydia queketti	Actinopterygii: Apogonidae	2006	
Jaydia smithi	Actinopterygii: Apogonidae	2013	
Lagocephalus guentheri	Actinopterygii: Tetraodontidae	2005	
Lagocephalus sceleratus	Actinopterygii: Tetraodontidae	2016	
Lagocephalus spadiceus	Actinopterygii: Tetraodontidae	1953	
Lagocephalus suezensis	Actinopterygii: Tetraodontidae	1977	
Leonnates persicus	Annelida: Nereididae	2001	
Leptochela aculeocaudata	Crustacea: Pasiphaeidae	1933	
Leucosia signata	Crustacea: Leucosiidae	1953	
Lophioturris indica	Mollusca: Turridae		
Marsupenaeus japonicus	Crustacea: Penaeidae	1924	
Metapenaeus monoceros	Crustacea: Penaeidae	1924	
Metapenaeus stebbingi	Crustacea: Penaeidae	1924	
Metapenaeopsis aegypti	Crustacea: Penaeidae	1990	
Metapenaeopsis mogiensis	Crustacea: Penaeidae	1997	
Modiolus auriculatus	Mollusca: Mytilidae	1960	
Myrax fugax	Crustacea: Leucosiidae	1930	
Nemipterus japonicus	Actinopterygii: Nemipteridae	2006	
Nemipterus randalli	Actinopterygii: Nemipteridae	2006	
Notopus dorsipes	Crustacea: Raninidae	1962	
Ogyrides mjoebergi	Crustacea: Ogyrididae	1947	
Ostorhinchus fasciatus	Actinopterygii: Apogonidae	2008	
Ostracion cubicus	Actinopterygii: Ostraciidae	2011	
Oxyurichthys petersii	Actinopterygii: Oxudercidae	1983	
Palaemonella rotumana	Crustacea: Palaemonidae	1948	
Pampus argenteus	Actinopterygii: Stromateidae	1896	
Panulirus ornatus	Crustacea: Palinuridae	1988	
Papilloculiceps longiceps	Actinopterygii: Platycephalidae	1986	
Parexocoetus mento	Actinopterygii: Exocoetidae	1935	
Parupeneus forsskali	Actinopterygii: Mullidae	2000	
Pelates quadrilineatus	Actinopterygii: Terapontidae	1970	
Penaeus hathor	Crustacea: Penaeidae	1997	
Penaeus semisulcatus	Crustacea: Penaeidae	1928	
Periclimenes calmani	Crustacea: Palaemonidae	1924	
Petroscirtes ancylodon	Actinopterygii: Blenniidae	1989	
Phidiana militaris	Mollusca: Facelinidae	2016	
Pilumnopeus vauquelini	Crustacea: Xanthidae	1924	
Plagusia tuberculata	Crustacea: Grapsidae	1981	
Planiliza carinata	Actinopterygii: Mugilidae	1971	
Platax teira	Actinopterygii: Ephippidae	2010	
Platycephalus indicus	Actinopterygii: Platycephalidae	1953	
Plectorhinchus gaterinus	Actinopterygii: Haemulidae	2016	
Plotosus lineatus	Actinopterygii: Plotosidae	2001	
Pomacanthus imperator	Actinopterygii: Pomacanthidae	2010	
Pomacanthus maculosus	Actinopterygii: Pomacanthidae	2009	
Pomadasys stridens	Actinopterygii: Haemulidae	1969	
Portunus segnis	Crustacea: Portunidae	1898	
Priacanthus sagittarius	Actinopterygii: Priacanthidae	2009	
Processa aequimana	Crustacea: Processidae	1946	
Pteragogus trispilus	Actinopterygii: Labridae	1992	
Pterois miles	Actinopterygii: Scorpaenidae	1992	
Rachycentron canadum	Actinopterygii: Rachycentridae	1986	
Rastrelliger kanagurta	Actinopterygii: Scombridae	1971	
Ratabulus prionotus	Actinopterygii: Platycephalidae	1947	
Rhabdosargus haffara	Actinopterygii: Sparidae	1991	
Rhabdosargus sarba	Actinopterygii: Sparidae	1991	
Rhopilema nomadica	Cnidaria: Rhizostomatidae	1970s	
Sardinella gibbosa	Actinopterygii: Clupeidae	2008	
Sargocentron rubrum	Actinopterygii: Holocentridae	1947	
Saron marmoratus	Crustacea: Hippolytidae	2013	
Saurida lessepsianus	Actinopterygii: Synodontidae	1953	
Scarus ghobban	Actinopterygii: Scaridae	1999	
Scomberomorus commerson	Actinopterygii: Scombridae	1935	
Sepia dollfusi	Mollusca: Sepiidae	2015	
Sepia pharaonis	Mollusca: Sepiidae	2003	
Sepioteuthis lessoniana	Mollusca: Loliginidae	2002	
Siganus luridus	Actinopterygii: Siganidae	1964	
Siganus rivulatus	Actinopterygii: Siganidae	1927	
Sillago suezensis	Actinopterygii: Sillaginidae	1977	
Sphaerozius nitidus	Crustacea: Xanthidae	1976	
Sphyraena chrysotaenia	Actinopterygii: Sphyraenidae	1930	
Sphyraena flavicauda	Actinopterygii: Sphyraenidae	1991	
Spratelloides delicatulus	Actinopterygii: Clupeidae	1978	
Stephanolepis diaspros	Actinopterygii: Monacanthidae	1927	
Synanceia verrucosa	Actinopterygii: Scorpaenidae	2010	
Synchiropus sechellensis	Actinopterygii: Callionymidae	2014	
Terapon jarbua	Actinopterygii: Terapontidae	2010	
Terapon puta	Actinopterygii: Terapontidae	1976	
Tetrosomus gibbosus	Actinopterygii: Ostraciidae	1988	
Thalamita poissonii	Crustacea: Portunidae	1952	
Trachurus indicus	Actinopterygii: Carangidae	2009	
Trachysalambria palaestinensis	Crustacea: Penaeidae	1924	
Trochus erithreus	Mollusca: Trochidae		
Torquigener flavimaculosus	Actinopterygii: Tetraodontidae	1987	
Trypauchen vagina	Actinopterygii: Oxudercidae	2011	
Tylerius spinosissimus	Actinopterygii: Tetraodontidae	2005	
Tylosurus choram	Actinopterygii: Belonidae	1963	
Upeneus moluccensis	Actinopterygii: Mullidae	1947	
Upeneus pori	Actinopterygii: Mullidae	1950	
Urocaridella pulchella	Crustacea: Palaemonidae	2008	
Vanderhorstia mertensi	Actinopterygii: Gobiidae	2008	

== Mediterranean species to Red Sea ==
- Argyrosomus regius
- Biuve fulvipunctata
- Gobius cobitis
- Gobius paganellus
- Serranus cabrilla
- Solea aegyptiaca
- Umbrina cirrosa
- Dicentrarchus labrax
