= Aspidosiphon elegans =

Scientific classification
- Kingdom: Animalia
- Phylum: Annelida
- Class: Sipuncula
- Order: Aspidosiphonida
- Family: Aspidosiphonidae
- Genus: Aspidosiphon
- Species: A. elegans

Binomial name
- Aspidosiphon elegans (Chamisso & Eysenhardt, 1821)

Synonyms
- Aspidosiphon brocki Augener, 1903; Aspidosiphon carolinus Satô, 1935; Aspidosiphon elegans (Chamisso & Eysenhardt, 1821); Aspidosiphon exilis Sluiter, 1886; Aspidosiphon homomyarium Johnson, 1965; Aspidosiphon ravus Sluiter, 1886; Aspidosiphon spinalis Ikeda, 1904; Aspidosiphon spinosus Sluiter, 1902; Loxosiphon elegans (Chamisso & Eysenhardt, 1821); Phascolosoma elegans (Chamisso & Eysenhardt, 1821); Sipunculus elegans (Chamisso & Eysenhardt, 1821)

Species of marine worm

Aspidosiphon elegans is a species of unsegmented benthic marine worm in the class Sipuncula, the peanut worms. It is a bioeroding species and burrows into limestone rocks, stones and corals. It occurs in the western Indo-Pacific region, the Red Sea, and the tropical western Atlantic Ocean, and is invasive in the eastern Mediterranean Sea.

== Description ==
Aspidosiphon elegans can grow up to 80 mm (3 in) in length, but 25 mm (1.0 in) is a more usual size. The introvert is at least as long as the trunk and both are smooth and white. The tip of the introvert bears the oral disc with the mouth and six to twelve short tentacles. The distal part of the introvert bears rings of two-pronged hooks while the proximal part bears scattered, dark-coloured conical hooks. The anal shield is ungrooved while the caudal shield is poorly developed and paler in colour than the anal shield. There are a pair of light-sensitive eye spots and a pair of nephridia.

== Distribution and habitat ==
This peanut worm is found in shallow waters in the northwestern Indian Ocean and the Red Sea, and the Levantine Sea, having arrived there at the latest by 1957 after the opening of the Suez Canal. It also occurs on the Atlantic coast of Central America, but not on the Pacific coast. It is a bioeroding organism and burrows into limestone rocks and stones, as well as coral heads, coralline algae and the shells of bivalve molluscs.

== Ecology ==
In the Mediterranean Sea, this species was found burrowing in calcareous rocks, in coralline algae (Corallina mediterranea) and in the mussel (Brachidontes pharaonis), another organism that has invaded the Mediterranean via the Suez Canal. In this locality, there were said to be 25 individuals per square metre.

Reproduction in this species is by transverse fission; a constriction appears at the posterior end of the trunk, gradually deepening until the part becomes detached, with regeneration of the main body components then following.
