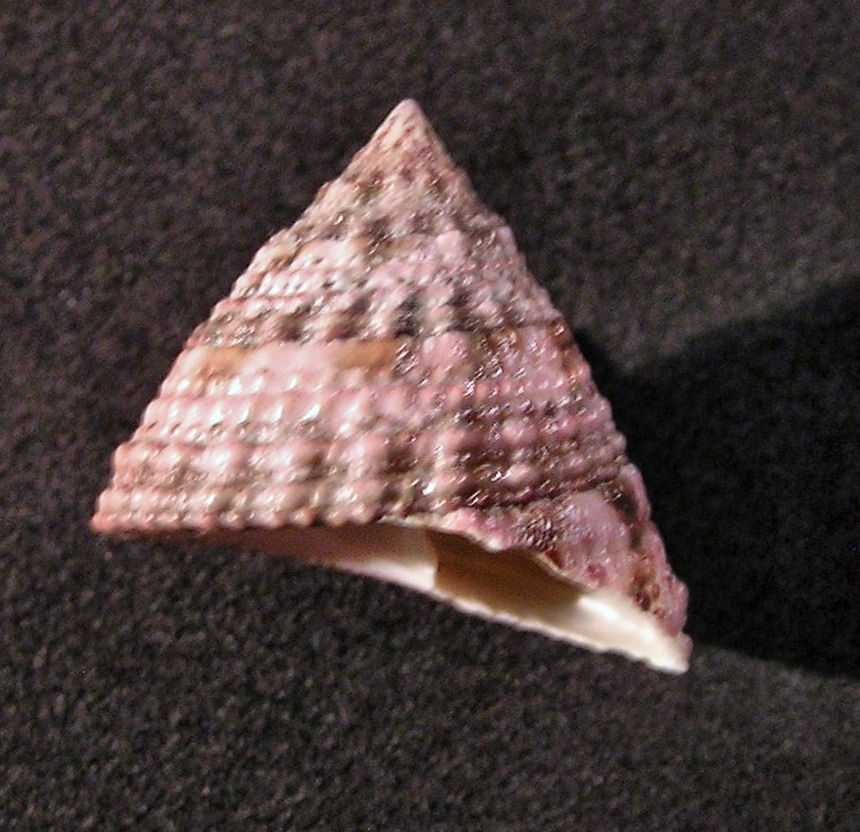
- Infundibulum aemulans

Scientific classification
- Kingdom: Animalia
- Phylum: Mollusca
- Class: Gastropoda
- Subclass: Vetigastropoda
- Order: Trochida
- Family: Trochidae
- Genus: Infundibulum; Montfort, 1810

Type species
- Infundibulum concavum (Gmelin, 1791)

Synonyms
- Carinidea Swainson, 1840; Polydonta (Infundibulum) Montfort, 1810; Trochus (Infundibulum)

= Infundibulum (gastropod) =

Genus of gastropods

Infundibulum is a genus of sea snails, marine gastropod mollusks in the family Trochidae, the top snails.

== Description ==
The conical shell is false-umbilicate. The periphery is angular. The base of the shell is nearly flat, or concave. The outer surface is smooth, costate or granular. The outer lip is not lirate within. The columella is inserted in the center of the axis. It is more or less folded above, its edge straight, oblique, not toothed, and without a notch at its base.

== Species ==
Species within the genus Infundibulum include:

- Infundibulum concavum (Gmelin, 1791)
- Infundibulum tomlini (Fulton, 1930)

The Indo-Pacific Molluscan Database also includes the following species:

- Infundibulum aemulans A. Adams, 1854

Synonyms

- Infundibulum (Lamprostoma) Swainson, 1840: synonym of Trochus Linnaeus, 1758
- Infundibulum baccatus Sowerby, G.B. III, 1889: synonym of Trochus cariniferus Reeve, L.A., 1842
- Infundibulum calcaratum (Souverbie in Souverbie & Montrouzier, 1874): synonym of Trochus calcaratus Souverbie in Souverbie & Montrouzier, 1875
- Infundibulum cariniferum (Reeve, 1842): synonym of Infundibulops cariniferus (Reeve, 1842)
- Infundibulum chloromphalus A. Adams, 1851: synonym of Trochus chloromphalus (A. Adams, 1851)
- Infundibulum erythraeum (Brocchi, 1821): synonym of Infundibulops erythraeus Brocchi, G.B., 1821
- Infundibulum typus Montfort, 1810: synonym of Infundibulum concavum (Gmelin, 1791)

Nomen dubium

- Infundibulum depressum Say, T., 1826
