= Meristics =

Area of zoology and botany

Meristics is an area of zoology and botany which relates to counting quantitative features of animals and plants, such as the number of fins or scales in fish. A meristic (countable trait) can be used to describe a particular species, or used to identify an unknown species. Meristic traits are often described in a shorthand notation called a meristic formula.

Meristic characters are the countable structures occurring in series (e.g. myomeres, vertebrae, fin rays). These characters are among the characters most commonly used for differentiation of species and populations. In the salmonids, scale counts have been most widely used for the differentiation of populations within species. In rainbow and steelhead trout the most notable differences among populations occur in counts of scales. Meristic comparison is used in phenetic and cladistic analyses.

== Meristic analysis ==
A meristic study is often a difficult task. For example, counting the features of a fish is not as easy as it may appear. Many meristic analyses are performed on dead fish that have been preserved in alcohol. Meristic traits are less easily observed on living fish, though it is possible. On very small fish, a microscope may be required.

Ichthyologists follow a basic set of rules when performing a meristic analysis, to remove as much ambiguity as possible. The specific practice, however, may vary depending on the type of fish. The methodology for counting meristic traits should be described by the specialist who performs the analysis.

== Meristic formula ==
A meristic formula is a shorthand method of describing the way the bones (rays) of a bony fish's fins are arranged. It is comparable to the floral formula for flowers.

Spine counts are given in Roman numerals, e.g. XI-XIV. Ray counts are given in Arabic numerals, e.g. 11–14.

The meristic formula of the dusky spinefoot (Siganus luridus) is: D, XIV+10; A, VII+8-9; P, 16–17; V, I+3+I; GR, 18-22

This means the fish has 14 spiny rays (bones) in the first part of its dorsal fin (D), followed by 10 soft rays. A is the anal fin, P represents the pectoral fins (near the gills and eyes), V represents the ventral or pelvic fins, and C is the caudal fin or tail (not indicated in this example). GR means gill raker count (see below).

== Vertebral counts ==
The number of bones in the backbone is a feature which can also be used to classify fish species. Usually all the vertebrae are counted. Vertebral counts may be split into abdominal (those associated with the body cavity) and caudal (tail) vertebrae. If there are sutures in the urostyle, components are counted, otherwise the urostyle is usually counted as one vertebra.

== Gill raker counts ==
The number of gill rakers on the first gill arch can also be used to identify a fish species. Rakers are counted for the upper and lower limbs of the gill arch, and a raker at the joint of the upper and lower limbs is counted as of the lower. Counts for the upper and lower limbs are separated by a + sign and ranges are bracketed, e.g., GR: 3 + (4-5).

== See also ==
- Morphometrics
