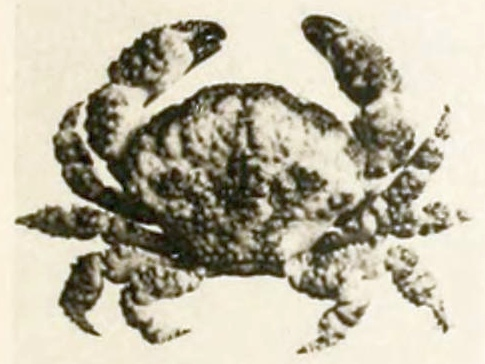

Scientific classification
- Domain: Eukaryota
- Kingdom: Animalia
- Phylum: Arthropoda
- Class: Malacostraca
- Order: Decapoda
- Suborder: Pleocyemata
- Infraorder: Brachyura
- Family: Xanthidae
- Genus: Actaea
- Species: A. savignii

Binomial name
- Actaea savignii (H. Milne Edwards), 1834)

Synonyms
- Actaea savignyi (Milne Edwards, 1834); Cancer granulatus Audouin, 1826; Cancer savignii H. Milne Edwards, 1834

= Actaea savignii =

Species of crab

Actea savignii is a species of Indo-Pacific crab from the family Xanthidae which is one of the spiny-legged rock crabs. It has colonised the Levantine Sea by Lessepsian migration through the Suez Canal from the Red Sea since the mid 2000s.

== Description ==
Actea savignii has an oval carapace which is slightly convex on the dorsal surface with a flat median region and a width which is about 1.3 times its length; the dorsal regions of the carapace have a covering of large, smooth, rounded, petal-shaped, dense tubercles. The anterolateral margin is slightly curved and is divided into four vaguely defined, tuberculate, rounded lobes while the anteriormost is barely marked. The posterolateral margin is shorter and slightly concave. The posterior margin is straight and bears a prominent row of tubercles. The front margin is strongly curved, and is equivalent to about 0.35 times the width of the carapace, it has two lobes along the sinuous frontal margin; the two lobes being divided by a wide V-shaped cleft. Almost the entire under surface is densely tuberculate; with the tubercles flattened and densely packed but varying in size, partly simple and partly petal-like in shape. The claws are subequal, heavy and also covered in dense tubercles. The fingers are distinctly shorter than the palm; with the proximal portion of the movable finger densely covered with flattened tubercles, and bearing two to three larger tubercles which form teeth. The walking legs are also densely covered on tubercules, with larger conical tubercles on the upper surface of the carpus and propodus. The dorsal surface of the carapace is yellowish with obvious purple-brown blotches on the orbital and cardiac regions. The claws and walking legs show a similar pattern although the fingers of the claws are dark brown to black in the males but are paler in the female. It can grow to 19.7 mm in carapace breadth.

== Distribution ==
Actea savignii has an Indo-Pacific distribution occurring from the Red Sea and eastern Coast of Africa east to Japan the east coast of Australia as far east as New Caledonia. It has been reported from the Suez Canal and its associated salt lakes from 1924. It was first recorded in the Mediterranean Sea off Lebanon in 2006 with subsequent records from Israel and Turkey.

== Biology ==
Actea savignii's biology is little known but most related species are largely plant eaters and most species of Xanthid crabs are toxic if consumed.
