= List of fishes of the Isle of Man =

The following is a list of the freshwater fish species of the Isle of Man. There are ten recorded species. The list has been generated from FishBase.

== Anguilliformes ==
=== Anguillidae ===
- Anguilla anguilla

European eel (Manx: astan) (native)

== Salmoniformes ==
=== Salmonidae ===
- Coregonus lavaretus

Common whitefish (questionable)

- Salmo salar

Atlantic salmon (Manx: braddan) (native)

- Salmo trutta trutta

Sea trout (native)

== Gasterosteiformes ==
=== Gasterosteidae ===
- Gasterosteus aculeatus aculeatus

Three spined stickleback (Manx: jacksharp) (native)

== Perciformes ==
=== Gobiidae ===
- Gobius paganellus

Rock goby (native)

== Petromyzontiformes ==
=== Petromyzontidae ===
- Lampetra fluviatilis

European river lamprey (native)

== Syngnathiformes ==
=== Syngnathidae ===
- Nerophis ophidion

Straight nosed pipefish (native)

== Osmeriformes ==
=== Osmeridae ===
- Osmerus eperlanus

European smelt (native)

== Petromyzontiformes ==
=== Petromyzontidae ===
- Petromyzon marinus

Sea lamprey (native)
