= Ras al-Helal =

Ras al-Helal رأس الهلال
- Village
- Location in Libya
- Coordinates: 32°52′58.97″N 22°10′49.01″E
- Country: Libya
- Region: Cyrenaica
- District: Derna
- Time zone: UTC+2 (EET)
- License Plate Code: 60

Ras al-Helal (Arabic: رأس الهلال, Raʾs al-Helal, "Crescent Cape") is a village on the southern shore of the Mediterranean Sea in Derna District, Cyrenaica, Libya. It takes its name from its cape, which appears to have a crescent shape when viewed from the surrounding Jebel Akhdar (English: The Green Mountain) mountainous plateau's foothills. It had a population totaling 2,235 in 2006. Ras al-Helal is known for its green, forested beach and its nearby waterfalls.

== Geography ==
Ras al-Helal is the southwest endpoint of the Levantine Sea in the eastern Mediterranean. It is located in Cyrenaica 55 km (34 mi) to the north-east of Bayda.

=== Beach ===
The Mediterranean coast of Libya is almost 1,900 km (1,200 mi) long, and nearly all its beaches are far from forests or significant vegetation. Being one of the few exceptions, Ras al-Helal attracts many vacationers. The area is isolated because of the lack of a direct coastal road connecting the nearby western town of Susa with Benghazi, the country's second largest city and the largest on the Cyrenaica coast.

=== Waterfalls ===
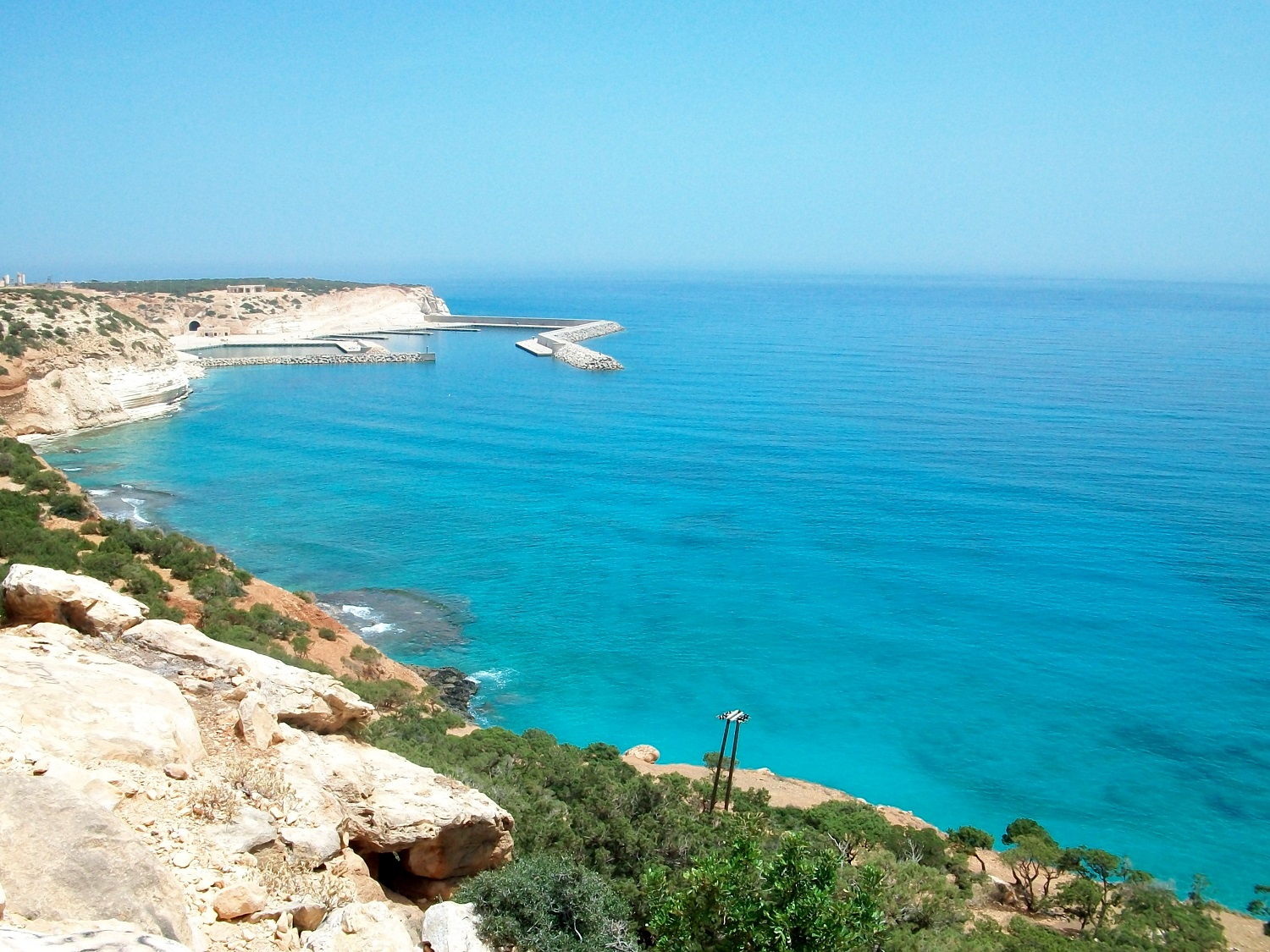
Ras al-Helal and the Mediterranean coast, eastern Libya.

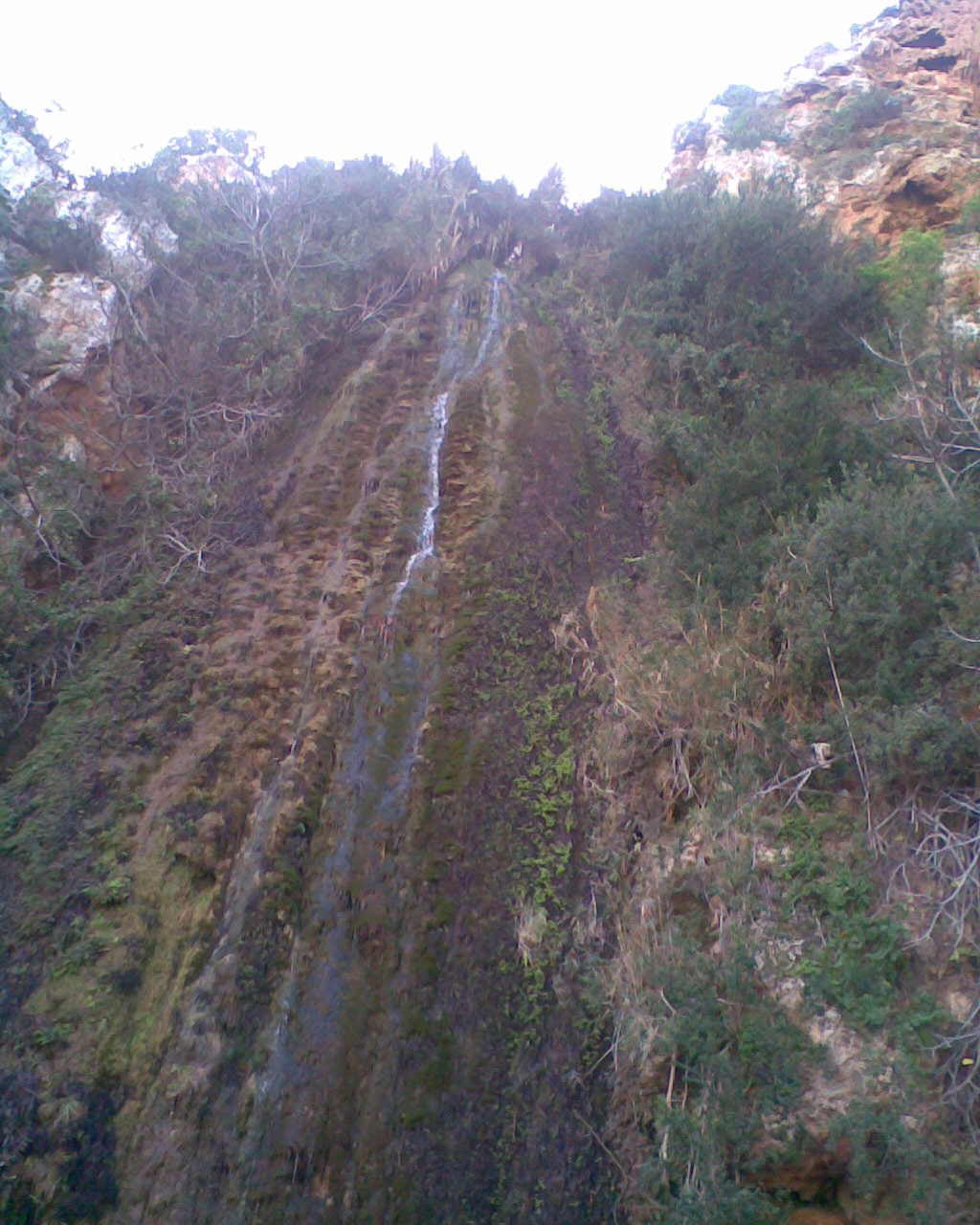
Upper waterfalls

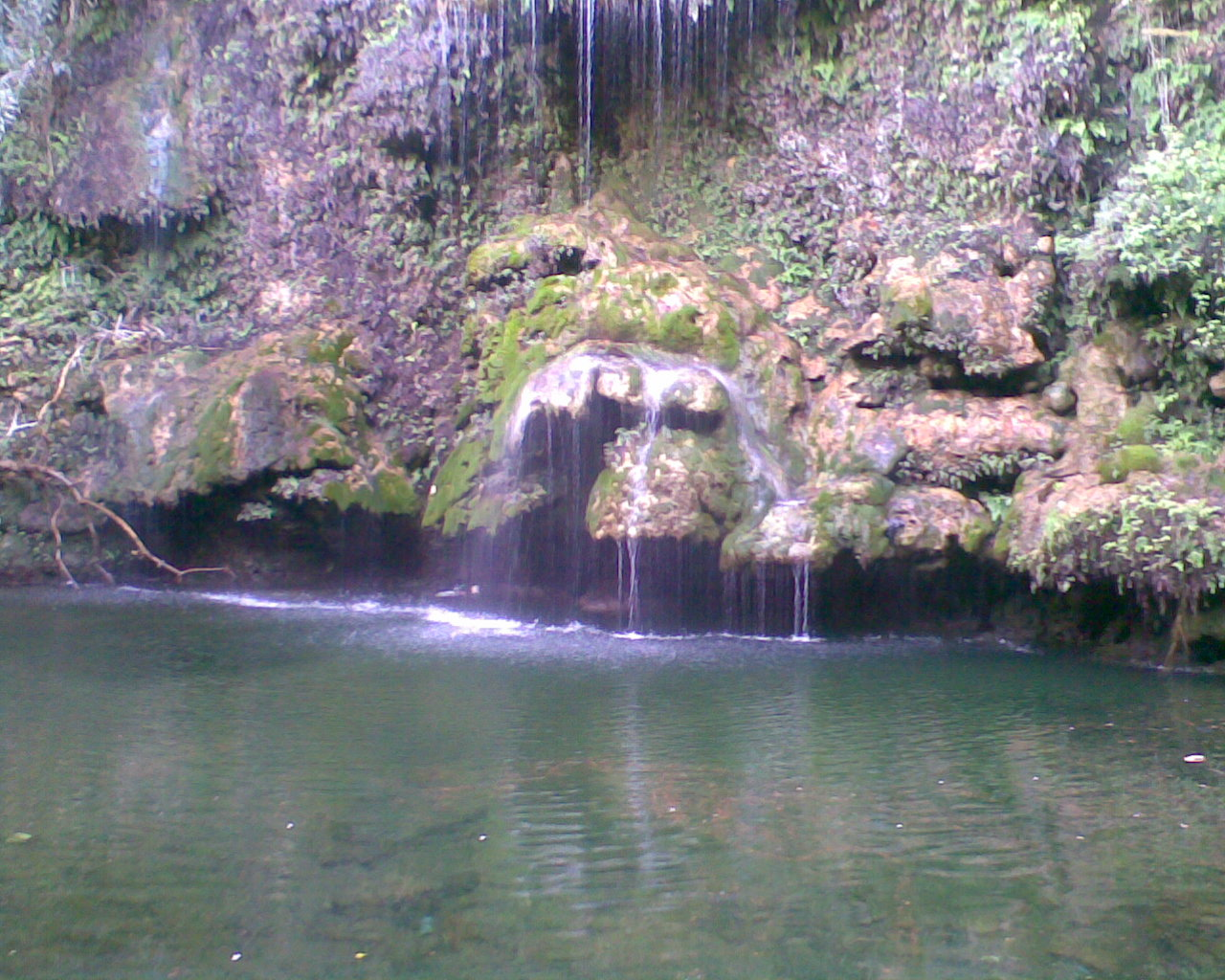
Lower waterfalls

The Ras al-Helal waterfalls are located up in the Jebel Akhdar, some 3.5 km (2.2 mi) from the coastal road. They are considered one of the most beautiful natural places in the country and attract many Libyan visitors and vacationers. The access road to the waterfalls, constructed during the Italian occupation, is old, narrow, and in poor condition. Some viewing locations for the waterfalls are along dangerous cliffs, so visiting alone is not safe.

== See also ==
- Geography of the Levantine Sea
