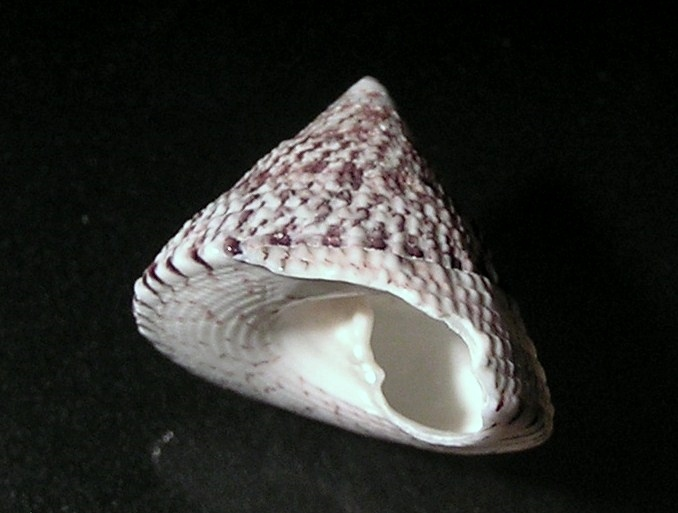
- Basal view of a shell of Infundibulum tomlini

Scientific classification
- Kingdom: Animalia
- Phylum: Mollusca
- Class: Gastropoda
- Subclass: Vetigastropoda
- Order: Trochida
- Superfamily: Trochoidea
- Family: Trochidae
- Genus: Infundibulum
- Species: I. tomlini

Binomial name
- Infundibulum tomlini (Fulton, 1930)

Synonyms
- Polydonta (Infundibulum) concava Melvill & Standen 1895; Trochus (Infundibulum) tomlini Fulton, 1930 (original description); Trochus maculatus Marshall, 1979; Trochus tomlini Kaicher, 1979

= Infundibulum tomlini =

Species of gastropod

Infundibulum tomlini is a species of sea snail, a marine gastropod mollusk in the family Trochidae, the top snails.

== Description ==
The width of the shell attains 36 mm.

== Distribution ==
This marine species occurs off Western Samoa, the Loyalty Islands, and Vanuatu.
