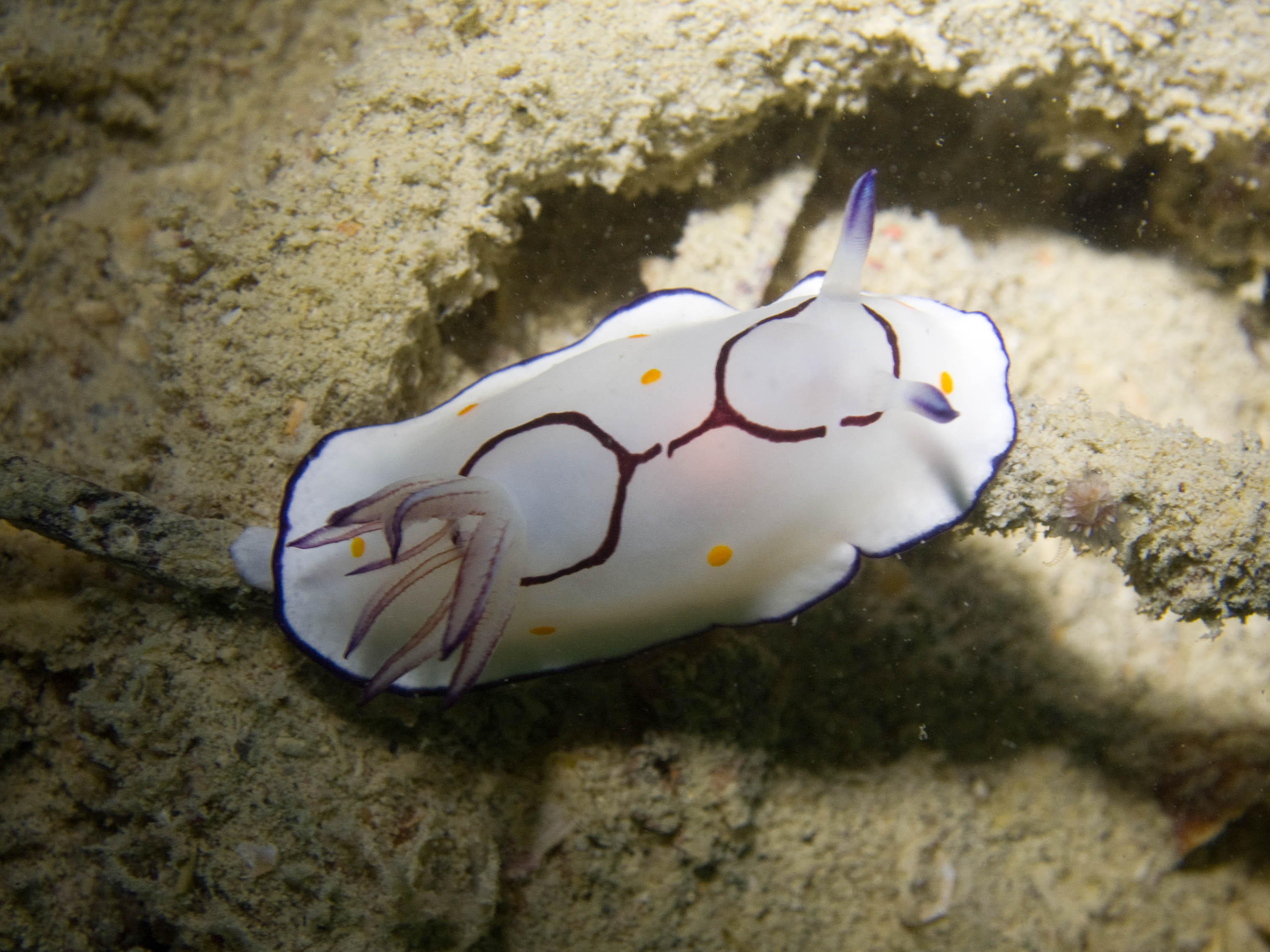
- Goniobranchus annulatus off the coast of Dubai, UAE

Scientific classification
- Kingdom: Animalia
- Phylum: Mollusca
- Class: Gastropoda
- Order: Nudibranchia
- Family: Chromodorididae
- Genus: Goniobranchus
- Species: G. annulatus

Binomial name
- Goniobranchus annulatus (Eliot, 1904

Synonyms
- Chromodoris annulata Eliot, 1904 (basionym); Glossodoris annulata (Eliot, 1904)

= Goniobranchus annulatus =

Species of gastropod

Goniobranchus annulatus is a species of sea slug, a very colourful dorid nudibranch, a shell-less marine gastropod mollusc in the family Chromodorididae.

== Description ==
Goniobranchus annulatus is a large smooth pale-bodied nudibranch with many vivid yellow spots, though these may be absent in some individuals. It has one purple ring around the gills and another ring around the rhinophores. The mantle usually has a purple border. It may grow to 100mm in total length. The gills are triangular in cross-section.

== Distribution ==
This nudibranch was described from Zanzibar. It occurs in the Red Sea, the Indian Ocean, from the East Coast of South Africa to Thailand. It is a Lessepsian migrant and has recently invaded the Mediterranean Sea, presumably through the Suez Canal.

== Watch ==
- Goniobranchus annulatus in the Persian Gulf, Abu-Dhabi, 2008.
