= Levantine Sea =

Easternmost part of the Mediterranean Sea

- Interactive map of Levantine Sea
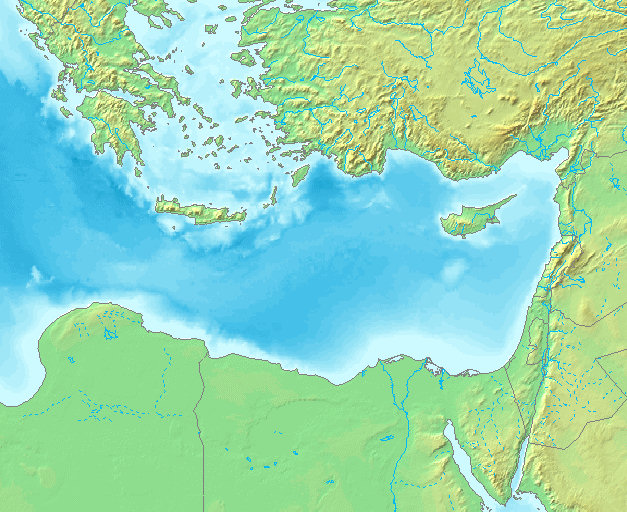
- The location of the Levantine Sea
- Location: Mediterranean
- Coordinates: 34°N 34°E
- Type: Sea
- Basin countries: Turkey, Greece, Cyprus, Egypt, Syria, Lebanon, Israel, Palestine
- Surface area: 320,000 km^{2} (120,000 sq mi)

The Levantine Sea is the easternmost part of the Mediterranean Sea.

== Geography ==
The Levantine Sea is bordered by Turkey in the north and north-east corner, Syria, Lebanon, and Israel, Egypt in the south, and the Aegean Sea in the northwest. Where it is used as a term its western border is amorphous, hence Mediterranean is more commonly used. The open western border to the next part of the Mediterranean (the Libyan Sea) is defined as a line from the headland Ras al-Helal in Libya to the Greek island of Gavdos, to the south of Crete.

The largest island in its subset of water is Cyprus. The greatest depth of 4,384 m (14,383 ft) is found in the Pliny Trench, about 80 km (50 mi) south of Crete. The Levantine Sea covers 320,000 km^{2} (120,000 sq mi).

The northern part of the Levantine Sea between Cyprus and Turkey can be further specified as the Cilician Sea, a term more arcane. Also in the north are two large bays, the Gulf of İskenderun (to the northeast) and the Gulf of Antalya (to the northwest).

== Basins ==
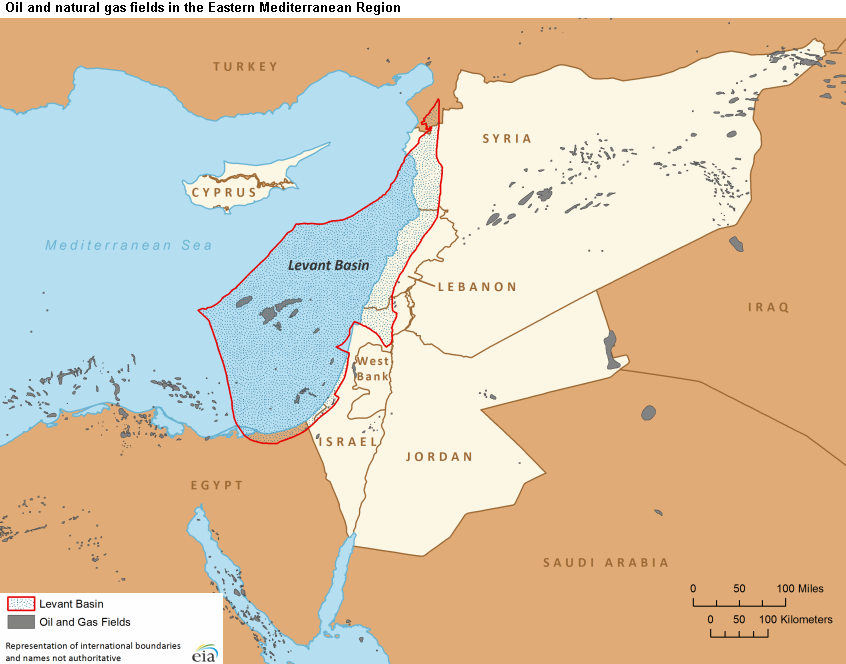
Boundaries of the Levant Basin, or Levantine Basin (US EIA)

The Leviathan gas field is quite central in the south-eastern corner, the Levantine Basin.

To the west of the Levantine Deep Marine Basin is the Nile Delta Basin, followed by the Herodotus Basin, 130,000 km^{2} (50,000 sq mi) large and up to 3,200 m (10,500 ft) deep, which – at a possible age of 340 million years – is believed to be the oldest known ocean crust worldwide.

== Ecology ==
The Suez Canal was completed in 1869, linking the Levantine Sea to the Red Sea – and mainly for large vessels. The Red Sea sits a little higher than the Eastern Mediterranean, so the canal is an intermittent tidal strait discharging water into the Mediterranean. The Bitter Lakes – hypersaline natural lakes, interacting with the canal – were a bar to migration of Red Sea species northward for many decades, but as their salinity has virtually equalized with that of the Red Sea, the barrier to migration was removed, and plants and animals from the Red Sea have begun to colonize the eastern Mediterranean. This is the Lessepsian migration, after Ferdinand de Lesseps, the chief engineer of the canal.

Most of the river discharge is from the Nile. Since the Aswan High Dam sits across the river in the 1960s it has facilitated the multiplication of Egyptian agriculture and population. It has reduced, to the sea, the flow of freshwater, mountainous minerals in the silt, and the distance traveled by silt (before this, borne by floodwater). This makes the sea slightly saltier and nutrient-poorer than before. This has decimated the morning sardine litorine haul in nets but favored many Red Sea species.

== See also ==
- Eastern Mediterranean
- Levant
