= Solea senegalensis =

Conservation status
- Data Deficient (IUCN 3.1)

Scientific classification
- Kingdom: Animalia
- Phylum: Chordata
- Class: Actinopterygii
- Order: Carangiformes
- Suborder: Pleuronectoidei
- Family: Soleidae
- Genus: Solea
- Species: S. senegalensis

Binomial name
- Solea senegalensis Kaup, 1858

Synonyms
- Solea melanochira Moreau, 1874; Solea cleverleyi Gilchrist, 1906

Species of fish

The Senegalese sole (Solea senegalensis) is a species of flatfish in the family Soleidae. It is found in the eastern Atlantic and the Mediterranean Sea.

== Description ==
The Senegalese sole is very similar to the common sole and like it, it has a flattened, oval body with the dorsal fin starting on the upper profile of the head to the front of the upper eye. The dorsal fin has 73–86 rays, the anal fin has 61–74 rays, and there is a well-developed pectoral fin on each side of its body which has 7–10 rays. The caudal fin is attached to the last rays of the dorsal and anal fins by a narrow membrane. There are numerous small and hair-like fringes on the blind side of the head, and the distance between the upper eye and the dorsal profile of the head is greater than the diameter of the eye. The anterior nostril on the blind side is surrounded by a small ridge, but is not enlarged. The lateral line is made up of 120–138 pored scales.

The Senegalese sole is greyish brown in colour on the eyed side, marked with numerous blue spots (which tend to disappear in dead specimens); the blind side is whitish. The pectoral fin on the eyed side has a nearly black membrane, which contrasts with the cream-coloured fin rays. This feature also allows one to distinguish between this species and the common sole; the latter has a neat black spot close to the margin of the pectoral fin instead. The Senegalese sole grows to a standard length of 60 cm, but is more commonly about 45 cm.

== Taxonomy ==
Over much of its range, the Senegalese sole is sympatric with the common sole, and it has been considered a subspecies by some authors in the past (as Solea vulgaris melanochira). It is, however, more closely related to the east Mediterranean Egyptian sole (Solea aegyptiaca) than it is to the common sole, and where these two species' ranges meet there is a hybrid zone, with hybrids being detected from the Gulf of Lions and the coasts of Tunisia.

== Distribution ==
The Selegalese sole originally occurred only in the eastern Atlantic, from southern Great Britain and Ireland (where it is rare) to Angola, including the Canary Islands. It is thought to have invaded the Mediterranean Sea via Gibraltar in the early 20th century. It expanded quickly in the western basin; and now is now found in places as far east as the Aegean Sea and the Sea of Marmara. It is, of course, also found off the southern coast of the Mediterranean, including Tunisia, where it is an important resource.

== Habitat and biology ==
The Selegalese sole is a demersal flatfish which occurs on sandy or muddy bottoms of varied habitats, from brackish lagoons and shallow waters to coastal regions where the water can be 100 m in depth. The adults feed mainly on small benthic invertebrates like polychaetes and bivalves, as well as small crustaceans. Females attain sexual maturity at around 3 years of age and may reach a total length of 30 cm. Spawning takes place during the summer, peaking in June around the Iberian Peninsula, when the water temperature is between 15 °C and 20 °C.

== Human interaction ==
In Europe, both the common and the Senegalese sole are landed and marketed, and there is little distinction made between them in official statistics. There are, however, geographical preferences: the common sole is preferred in northern Europe, and the Senegalese sole is preferred in more southernly areas. These preferences are reflected in the market price, which is higher for the common sole in northern and Western Europe, and higher for the Senegalese sole in southern Europe. The flesh is sold fresh, normally as fillets; the smaller fillets go to domestic consumers directly, while the larger ones are sold to commercial establishments such as hotels and restaurants.

The Senegalese sole is widely produced in aquaculture in Portugal and Spain.
