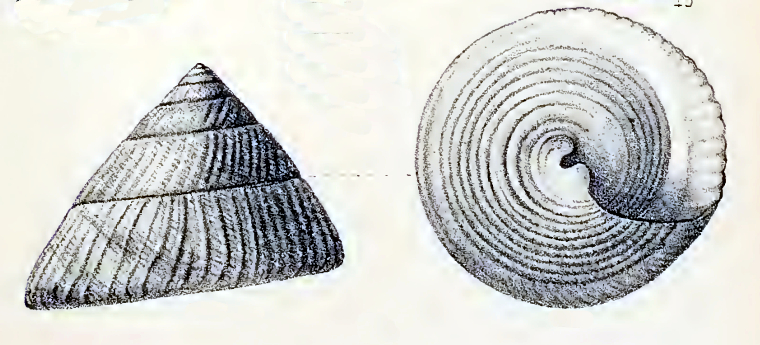
- Drawing showing two views of a shell of Infundibulum concavum

Scientific classification
- Kingdom: Animalia
- Phylum: Mollusca
- Class: Gastropoda
- Subclass: Vetigastropoda
- Order: Trochida
- Superfamily: Trochoidea
- Family: Trochidae
- Genus: Infundibulum
- Species: I. concavum

Binomial name
- Infundibulum concavum (Gmelin, 1791)

Synonyms
- Carinidea concavus Swainson, 1840; Clanculus concavus (Gmelin); Infundibulum concavum Cossmann, 1918; Infundibulum typus Montfort, 1810; Polydonta (Carinidea) concavus Chenu, 1859; Tectus concavus (Gmelin, 1791); Trochus concavus Gmelin, 1791 (original description); Trochus (Infundibulum) concavus Pilsbry, 1889; Trochus (Polydonta) concavus Martens, 1880

= Infundibulum concavum =

Species of gastropod

Infundibulum concavum is a species of sea snail, a marine gastropod mollusk in the family Trochidae, the top snails.

== Description ==
The height of the shell varies between 35 mm and 40 mm, and its diameter ranges from 45 mm to 47 mm. The shell is false-umbilicate and has a regularly conic shape, being concave on the underside. Its color is greenish and roseate under a dull grayish-green cuticle. The outlines of the spire are nearly rectilinear. The 7 to 8 whorls are planulate, very obliquely striate, radiately corrugated, and covered with a very minute secondary sculpture of fine, close, radiating wrinkles. The body whorl is acutely carinated at the periphery. The base of the shell is concave and concentrically lirate, with about 6 to 8 lirae that are granose in the young and nearly smooth in the adult. The aperture is very oblique, covering half the base. The outer lip is very prosocline and crenulated by the folds on the outside. The basal margin is straight, thin, and simple. The columella is oblique, with a strong fold above, projecting into the aperture with a very deep insertion. The parietal wall is lirate. The umbilical tract is white or yellowish, spirally costate in young and smooth in fully adult specimens.

This is a very distinct form, with an aperture so oblique that it resembles a Calyptraea Lamarck, 1799

== Distribution ==
This species occurs in the Indian Ocean off Madagascar and the Mascarene Basin.
