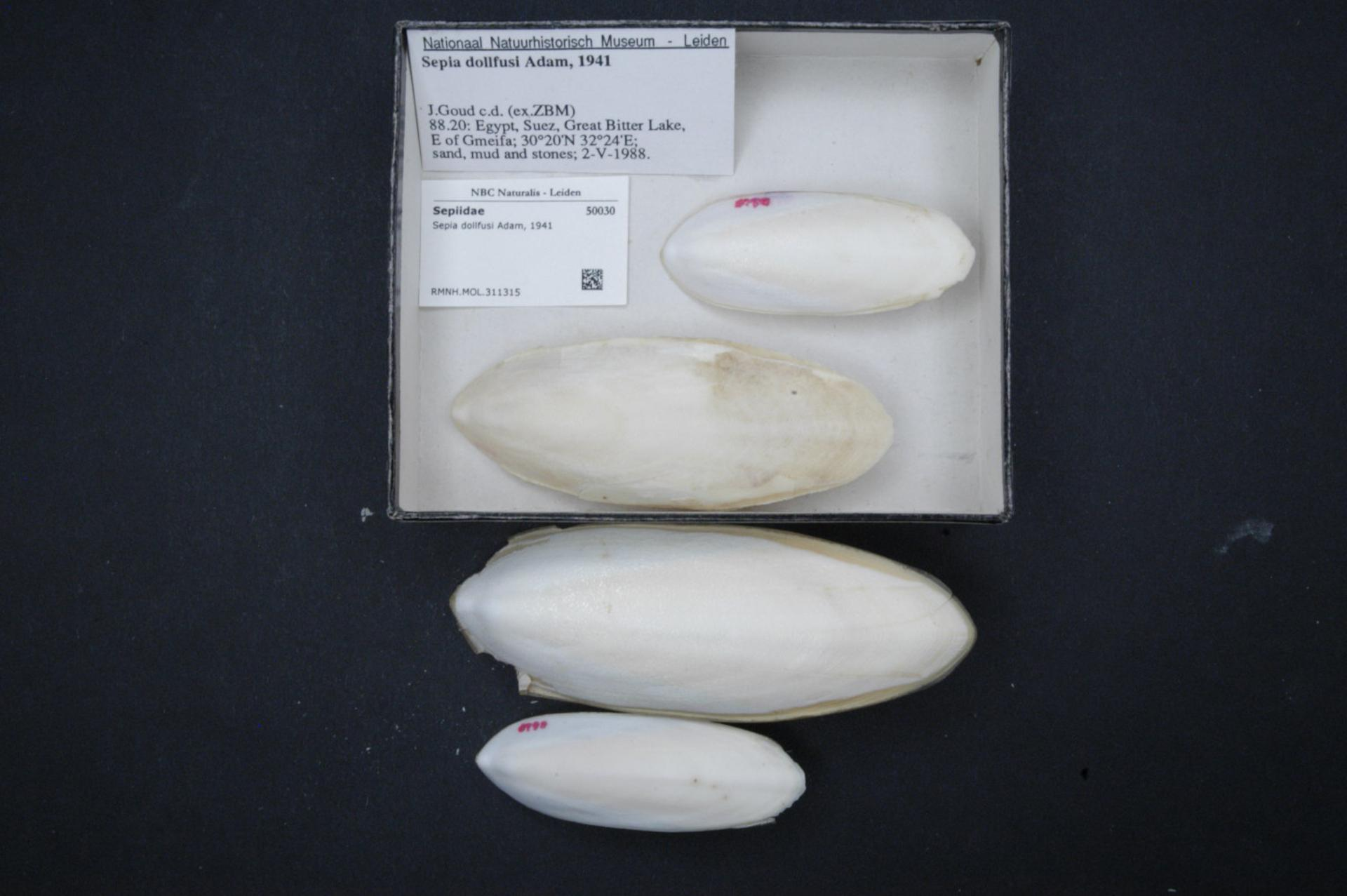
- Cuttlebones of Sepia dollfusi in the Rijksmuseum van Natuurlijke Historie, Leiden

Conservation status
- Data Deficient (IUCN 3.1)

Scientific classification
- Kingdom: Animalia
- Phylum: Mollusca
- Class: Cephalopoda
- Order: Sepiida
- Family: Sepiidae
- Genus: Sepia
- Subgenus: Sepia
- Species: S. dollfusi

Binomial name
- Sepia dollfusi Adam, 1941

= Sepia dollfusi =

Species of cuttlefish

Sepia dollfusi is a species of cuttlefish in the Phylum Mollusca, under the Class Cephalopoda, and under the Order Sepiida. It was discovered in the early 1940s by William Adam.

A known type specimen was collected near Périm Island in the southern Red Sea and is deposited at the Muséum National d'Histoire Naturelle in Paris. The only other known related specimen is a bone with “no locality”, obtained from Adam himself, mentioned in a catalogue for the Collections of the Royal Scottish museum in Edinburgh.

== Appearance ==
Sepia dollfusi grows to an average mantle length of ~110 mm. Notable physiological features include an oval shell (cuttlebone) about the same size of their mantle’s length, little distance between head and mantle, and short arms compared to other cuttlefish such as Acanthosepion pharaonis. They have a white underside with unique ventral bulging and a beige overside. S. dollfusi has tentacular club suckers the get smaller towards the end of the club. Younger S. dollfusi grow faster than older members of their species. Both sexes are quite similar in appearance.

== Species distribution ==
They are typically found in the West Indian Ocean with a depth range of 31°N - 30°N, and a distribution range of 32°E - 33°E. They are considered native to the Red Sea and southern part of the Suez Canal in Egypt, however, some suggest that they are not originally from the area. It has been recorded once in the Egyptian sector of the Mediterranean Sea, so it is potentially a Lessepsian migrant into the Mediterranean via the Suez Canal., along with various other invertebrate species that have also joined the area in recent decades. It is noted that they are also “widely distributed in the Indo Pacific”, with 2014 being the first documentation of their existence in the Mediterranean. This documentation notes “a small-sized cuttlefish”, with a mantle length of about “15 cm” and said to be present “in benthic habitats of the neritic zone”.

== Reproduction ==
In regards to reproductive behavior, they are generally quite similar to other cuttlefish in the Sepiida Order. Typical fecundity (“by counting the number of maturing and mature ova”) is 30-273 and there is a typical breeding window of January to April. They are more difficult to find during the summer months after their regular spawning season, likely migrating elsewhere to deposit their eggs. Where their eggs are lay their eggs is currently mostly unknown.

Both males and females in the species follow a timeline for sexual maturation, with males beginning as early as November and females as early as December. However, sexual maturation affects the sexes’ physiology differently. In contrast to males, females typically show a decline in total body mass with sexual maturity. Males only show decline in the viscera. As they progress through the cycle of sexual maturity, feeding lessens. Being unable to receive the nutrition and energy needed, this eventually leads to death shortly after breeding season.

== Other info ==
Although, an important commercial species in the Suez Canal (used for human consumption), not a lot of in depth information is difficult to track. Most scientific journals utilize the exact same photographs and information from the same sources or specimen studies. Various platforms used by the public, such as iNaturalist and Animalia describe the species as “DD” or “data deficient”, a status placed by the IUCN Red List. The last known assessment took place on the 23rd of March, 2009.
