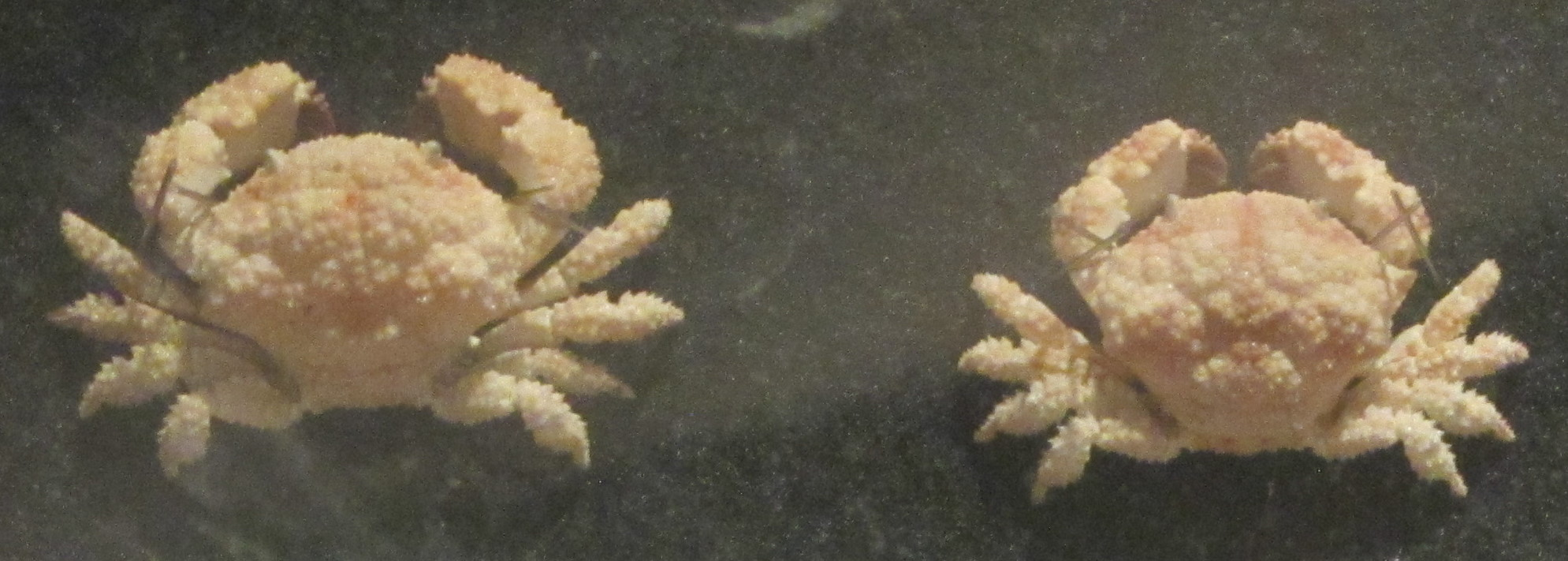

Scientific classification
- Domain: Eukaryota
- Kingdom: Animalia
- Phylum: Arthropoda
- Class: Malacostraca
- Order: Decapoda
- Suborder: Pleocyemata
- Infraorder: Brachyura
- Family: Xanthidae
- Subfamily: Actaeinae
- Genus: Actaea; De Haan, 1833

= Actaea (crab) =

Genus of crabs

Actaea is a genus of crabs in the family Xanthidae, containing the following species:

- Actaea acantha (H. Milne-Edwards, 1834)
- Actaea allisoni Garth, 1985
- Actaea angusta Rathbun, 1898
- Actaea areolata (Dana, 1852)
- Actaea bifrons Rathbun, 1898
- Actaea bocki Odhner, 1925
- Actaea calculosa (H. Milne-Edwards, 1834)
- Actaea capricornensis Ward, 1933
- Actaea carcharias White, 1848
- Actaea catalai Guinot, 1976
- †Actaea cretacea Rathbun, 1935
- Actaea flosculata Alcock, 1898
- †Actaea formosana Hu & Tao, 2000
- Actaea fragifera (White, 1848)
- Actaea glandifera Rathbun, 1914
- Actaea grimaldii Ng & Bouchet, 2015
- Actaea hieroglyphica Odhner, 1925
- Actaea hystrix Miers, 1886
- Actaea jacquelinae Guinot, 1976
- Actaea levidorsalis Montgomery, 1931
- Actaea occidentalis Odhner, 1925
- Actaea peronii (H. Milne-Edwards, 1834)
- †Actaea persica A. Milne-Edwards, 1865
- Actaea perspinosa Borradaile, 1902
- Actaea petalifera Odhner, 1925
- Actaea polyacantha (Heller, 1861)
- Actaea polydora (Herbst, 1801)
- Actaea pura Stimpson, 1858
- Actaea savignii (H. Milne-Edwards, 1834)
- Actaea semblatae Guinot, 1976
- Actaea spinosissima Borradaile, 1902
- Actaea spongiosa (Dana, 1852)
- Actaea squamosa Henderson, 1893
- Actaea squamulosa Odhner, 1925
- †Actaea tropicana Hu & Tao, 1996
- †Actaea turcocampestris Müller, 1984
