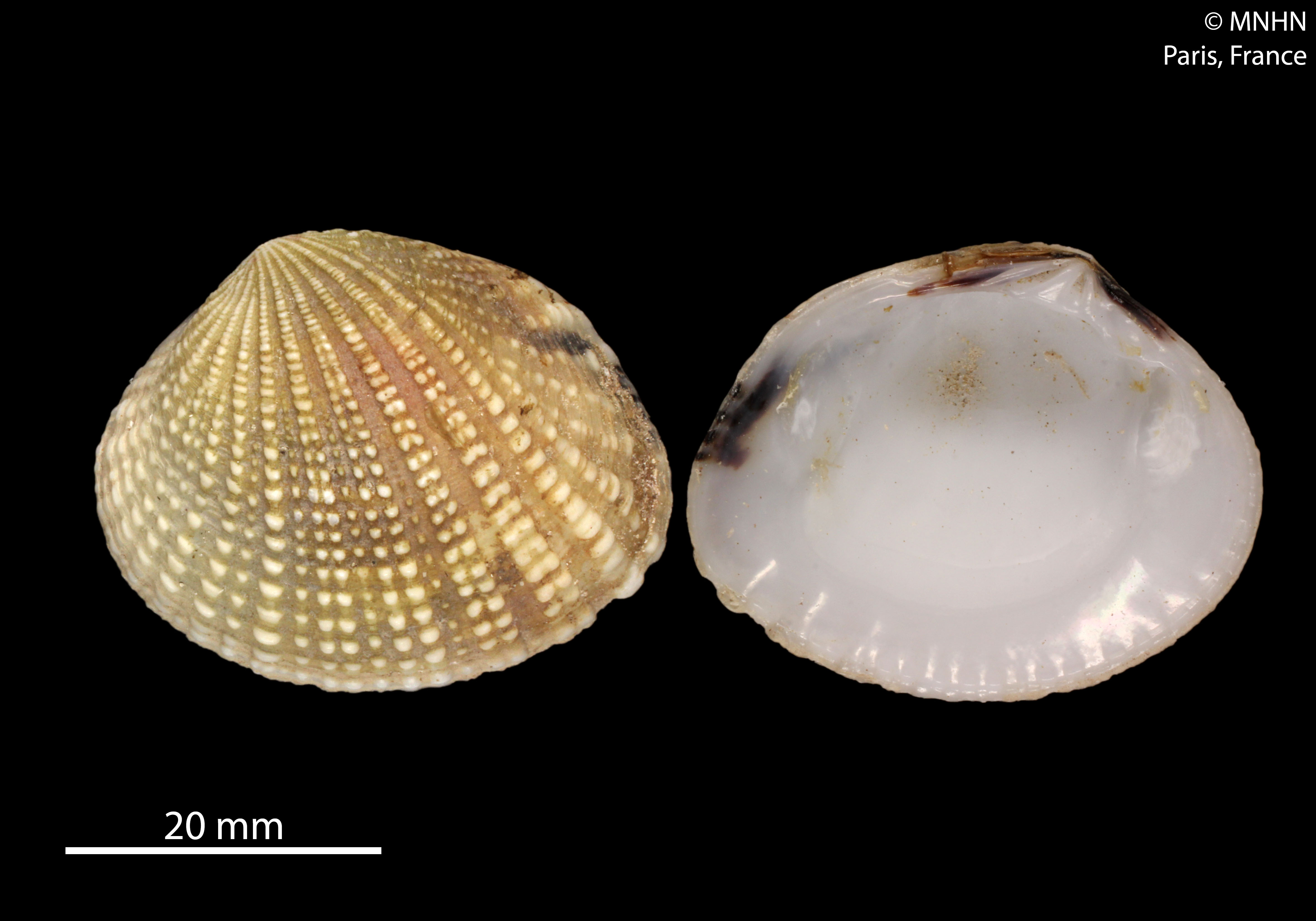

Scientific classification
- Kingdom: Animalia
- Phylum: Mollusca
- Class: Bivalvia
- Order: Venerida
- Family: Veneridae
- Genus: Gafrarium
- Species: G. pectinatum

Binomial name
- Gafrarium pectinatum (Linnaeus, 1758)

Synonyms
- See text

= Gafrarium pectinatum =

Species of mollusc

Gafrarium pectinatum, also known as Gafrarium tumidum, is a species of the genus Gafrarium in the family of Veneridae, order Veneroida in the bivalve class. They are edible clams. WoRMS believe the latter is the synonyms of the other one, but malocologist from Taiwan distinguish the two from the patterns of their shells

Right and left valve of the same specimen:

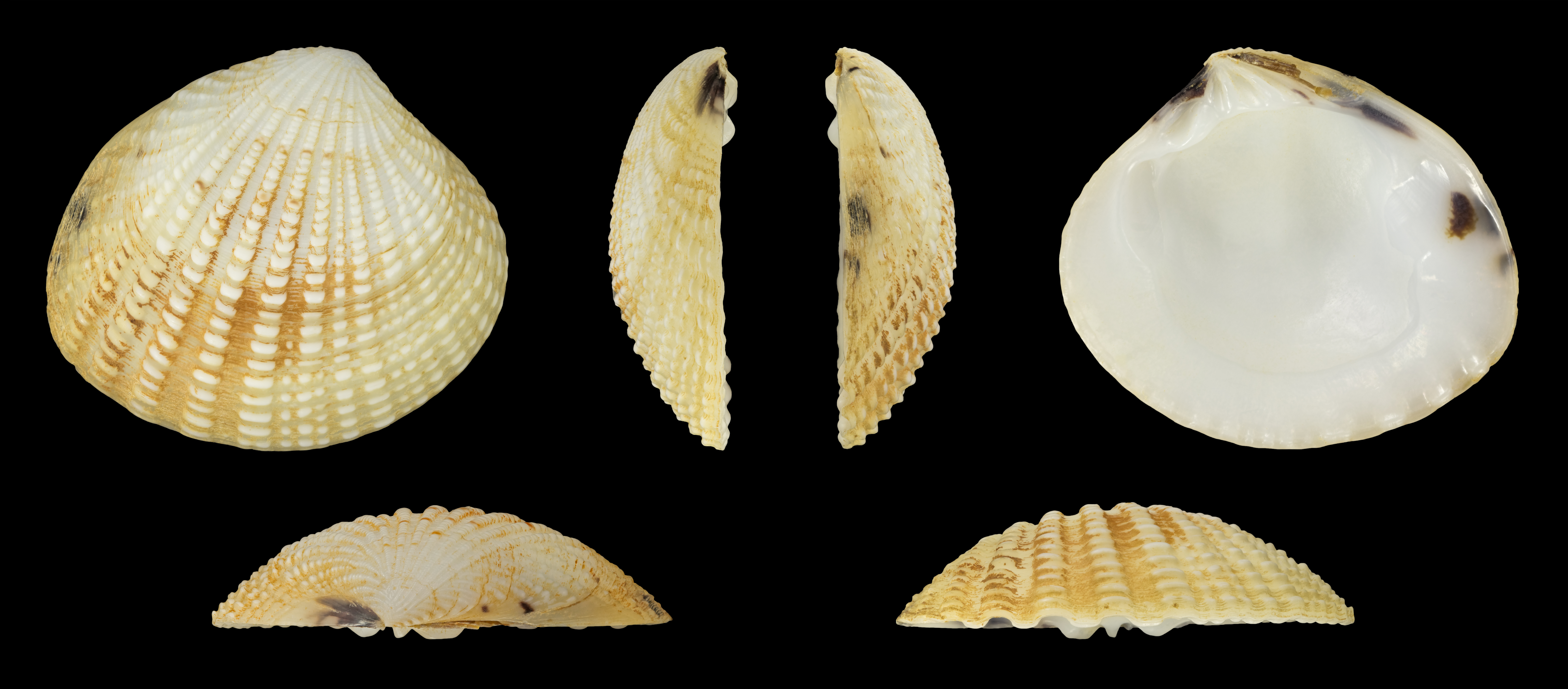
Right valve

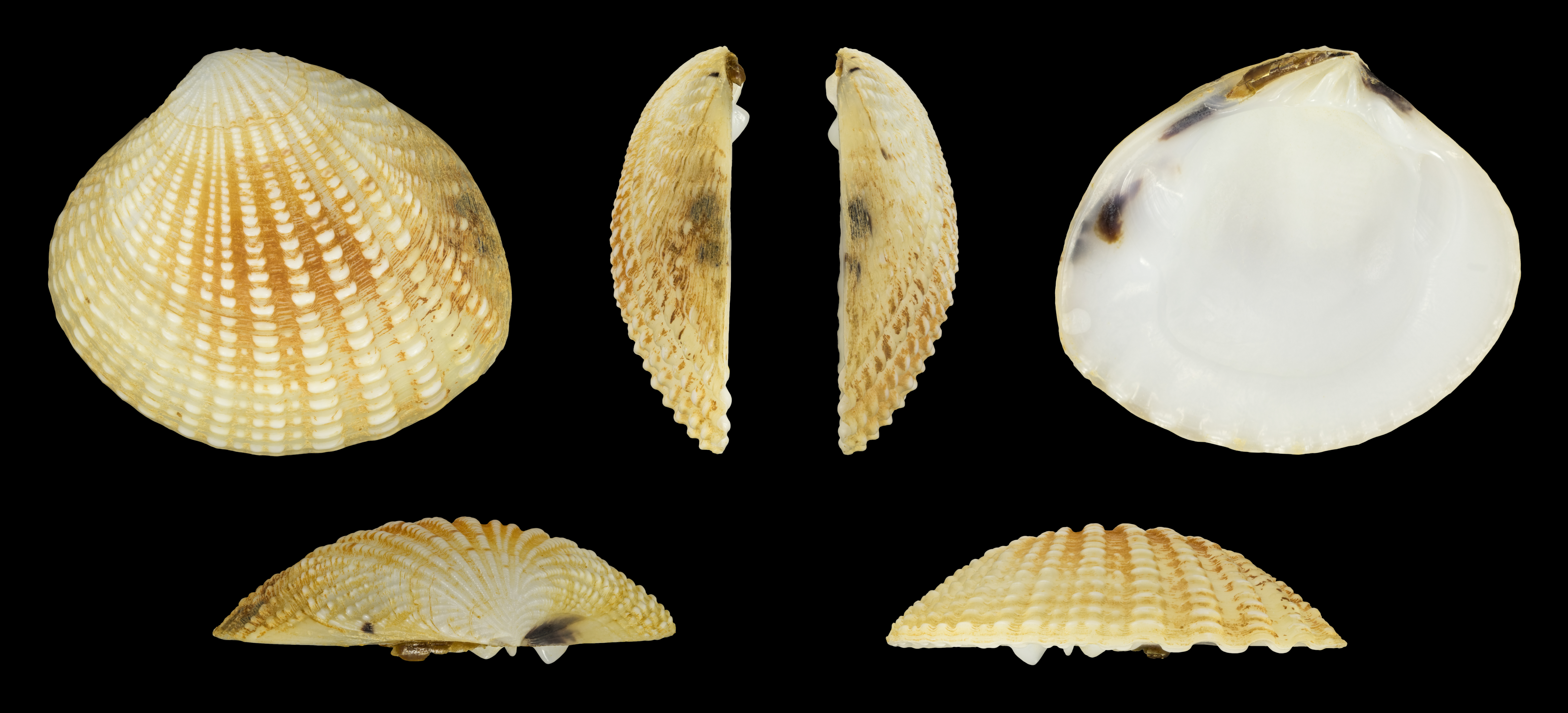
Left valve

== Distribution ==
Mainly distributed in Japan, Taiwan (mainly at east shore of the Taiwan Strait, but also scattered along the Pacific shore), South China Sea (Hainan Island and Daya Bay, Singapore, Malaysia), Thailand (both Gulf of Thailand and Andaman Sea). Also seen in Chagos Archipelago and Seychelles of Indian Ocean. After the opening of the Suez Canal, this species was brought from the Indo-Pacific Oceans to the Red Sea as well as the Mediterranean Sea.

== Consumption ==
This clam is usually fried or cooked into soup.

== Synonyms ==
- Circe pectinata (Linnaeus, 1758)
- Circe pythinoides Tenison-Woods, 1878
- Crista pectinata (Linnaeus, 1758)
- Cytherea gibbia Lamarck, 1818
- Cytherea pectinata Lamarck, 1818
- Cytherea ranella Lamarck, 1818
- Gafrarium angulatum Röding, 1798
- Gafrarium cardiodeum Röding, 1798
- Gafrarium costatum Röding, 1798
- Gafrarium depressum Röding, 1798
- Gafrarium pectinatum pectinatum (Linnaeus, 1758)
- Gafrarium tumidum Röding, 1798
- Venus pectinata Linnaeus, 1758 (Original combination)
