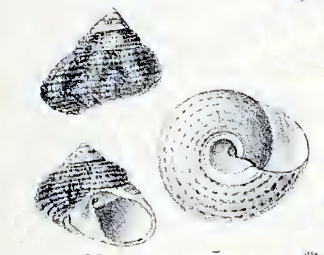
- Drawing with three views of a shell of Trochus cariniferus

Scientific classification
- Kingdom: Animalia
- Phylum: Mollusca
- Class: Gastropoda
- Subclass: Vetigastropoda
- Order: Trochida
- Superfamily: Trochoidea
- Family: Trochidae
- Genus: Trochus
- Species: T. cariniferus

Binomial name
- Trochus cariniferus Reeve, 1842

Synonyms
- Infundibulops cariniferus (Reeve, 1842); Infundibulum baccatus Sowerby, G.B. III, 1889; Infundibulum cariniferum (Reeve, 1842); Polydonta (Infundibulum) concinnum A. Adams, 1855; Polydonta concinnum A. Adams, 1855; Trochus (Infundibulops) cariniferus Reeve, 1842; Trochus (Infundibulum) baccatus G. B. Sowerby III, 1889; Trochus (Polydonta) cariniferus Reeve, 1842; Trochus (Trochus) radiatus Moura, 1976; Trochus baccatus G. B. Sowerby III, 1889; Trochus wilsi Pickery, 1989

= Trochus cariniferus =

Species of gastropod

Trochus cariniferus is a species of small sea snail, a marine gastropod mollusc in the family Trochidae, the top snails.

== Description ==
The size of the adult shell of this species varies between 10 mm and 30 mm. The rather thin, false-umbilicate shell has a wide-conical shape. It is, dark green, the upper surface irregularly broadly maculate with crimson or purplish red. The ribs of the base are articulated with the same. The about six whorls are somewhat convex. The upper surface of each whorl shows usually four or five spiral closely granose lirae, in the interstices between which sharp microscopic oblique and spiral striae are visible under a lens. The body whorl is carinated at the periphery, usually with six lirae on the upper surface, convex beneath, concentrically lirate, the lime very narrow, feebly granose or nearly smooth, separated by wide lightly obliquely striate interspaces, the inner lirae closer. The aperture is rhomboidal. The columella is not folded above, but straight from the insertion to the base, its edge simple. The umbilical area is deep, rather narrow, white, smooth, with a spiral rib just inside the margin, and with its outer border tinged with red.

== Distribution ==
This marine species occurs in the Indian Ocean off Tanzania, Madagascar and South Africa.

== Notes ==
- Kilburn, R. N. 1972. Taxonomic notes on South African marine Mollusca (2), with the description of new species and subspecies of Conus, Nassarius, Vexillum and Demoulia. Annals of the Natal Museum 21(2):391-437, 15 figs.
