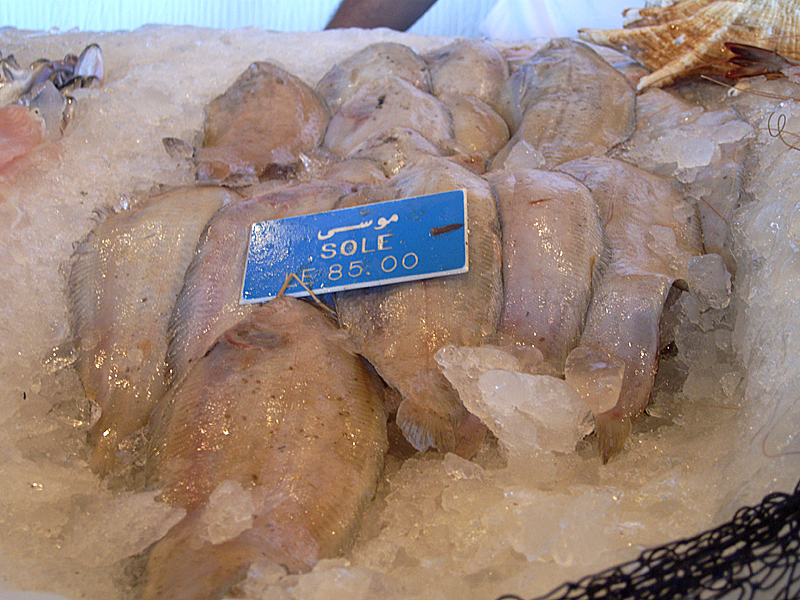

Conservation status
- Least Concern (IUCN 3.1)

Scientific classification
- Kingdom: Animalia
- Phylum: Chordata
- Class: Actinopterygii
- Order: Carangiformes
- Suborder: Pleuronectoidei
- Family: Soleidae
- Genus: Solea
- Species: S. aegyptiaca

Binomial name
- Solea aegyptiaca Chabanaud, 1927

= Egyptian sole =

Species of fish

The Egyptian sole (Solea aegyptiaca) is a species of flatfish in the true sole family, Soleidae. It lives on the sandy or muddy seabed of the Mediterranean Sea, and is now colonising the Red Sea. It often semi-immerses itself in the substrate. The upper side is greyish-brown while the underside is white. It grows to a maximum length of about 70 cm (28 in). This fish is used for human consumption and is prized as a food fish. It is caught mostly by trawling on the seabed.

== Taxonomy ==
In the past Solea aegyptiaca was considered a junior synonym of Solea vulgaris, itself a junior synonym of Solea solea, the common sole. However recent molecular studies have demonstrated that it is a separate species with diagnostic molecular and morphological differences between the species.

== Taxonomy ==
Over much of its range Solea aegyptiaca is sympatric with the rather similar common sole and has been considered a subspecies by some authors in the past. It is however more closely related to the east Mediterranean Senegalese sole (Solea senegalensis) than it is to the common sole, and where these two species' ranges meet there is a hybrid zone, with hybrids being detected from the Gulf of Lions and the coats of Tunisia as demonstrated in the research of Dr. Khaled Ouanes. S. senegalensis is thought to have invaded the Mediterranean from the eastern Atlantic through the Straits of Gibraltar, a phenomenon knows as Herculean migration after the Pillars of Hercules.

== Description ==
Solea aegyptiaca is a dextral flatfish with on oval body shape which is brownish grey on the eyed side, with the eyed side pectoral fin being largely coloured black. The left, uneyed, side is white. It is very similar to the common sole, with which it is sympatric, but the vertebrate count and fin ray count differ. S. aegyptiaca has 39-44 vertebrae to the common sole's 46-52, while the dorsal fin of S. aegyptiaca has 62-87 finrays to the common sole's 69-97 finrays, other finray counts are pectoral fin on eyed side with 7-9 to 9-10, anal finrays 51-72 compared to 53-79. The lateral line of S. aegyptiaca has 106-150 pored scales while that of the common sole has 116-165 pored scales. The eyed side pectoral fin of S.aegyptiaca also has a more extensive black blotch than that of the common sole. It tends to be slightly smaller than the common sole with a maximum length of 65 cm and an average length of 25 cm.

== Distribution and habitat ==
Solea aegyptiaca is a benthic demersal species that lives on soft mud and sand substrates in coastal and littoral waters and in brackish lagoons, down to 100m in depth. It is found in the Mediterranean Sea as far west as the Gulf of Gabes and north to the Gulf of Lion and into the southern Adriatic Sea. It has been recorded in the Suez Canal and, more recently, the Gulf of Suez, in the Red Sea, making S. aegytiaca an anti-Lessepsian migrant.

== Biology ==
Solea aegyptiaca feeds on benthic invertebrates, mainly Cnidaria, polychaete worms and bivalves. It is a relatively fast growing species which has a maximum age of four years. Spawing takes place on the southern Mediterranean coasts in the late Autumn and Winter. The female fish tend to be larger than the males and reach sexual maturity at around 15 cm, in Egyptian Mediterranean waters spawning was recorded between January and June, females producing up to 38,000 eggs, with the most eggs being produced by the longest females. S.aegytiaca is a host for the trematode parasite Allopodocotyle tunisiensis.

== Fisheries ==
Solea aegyptiaca is a commercially important flatfish species in the Mediterranean waters of Egypt where it is fished by bottom trawls . The exploitation rate of S. aegyptiaca was 0.71, which is greater than the optimum fisheries exploitation rate of 0.66. A close season has been suggested so that fisheries cease when this species is spawning in January to June with a minimum catch size of 18 cm also being suggested so that all fish have the opportunity to reproduce. The species has also been grown in aquaculture in Egypt. The FAO does not register catches of S.aegyptiaca separately from those of other Mediterranean sole species.
