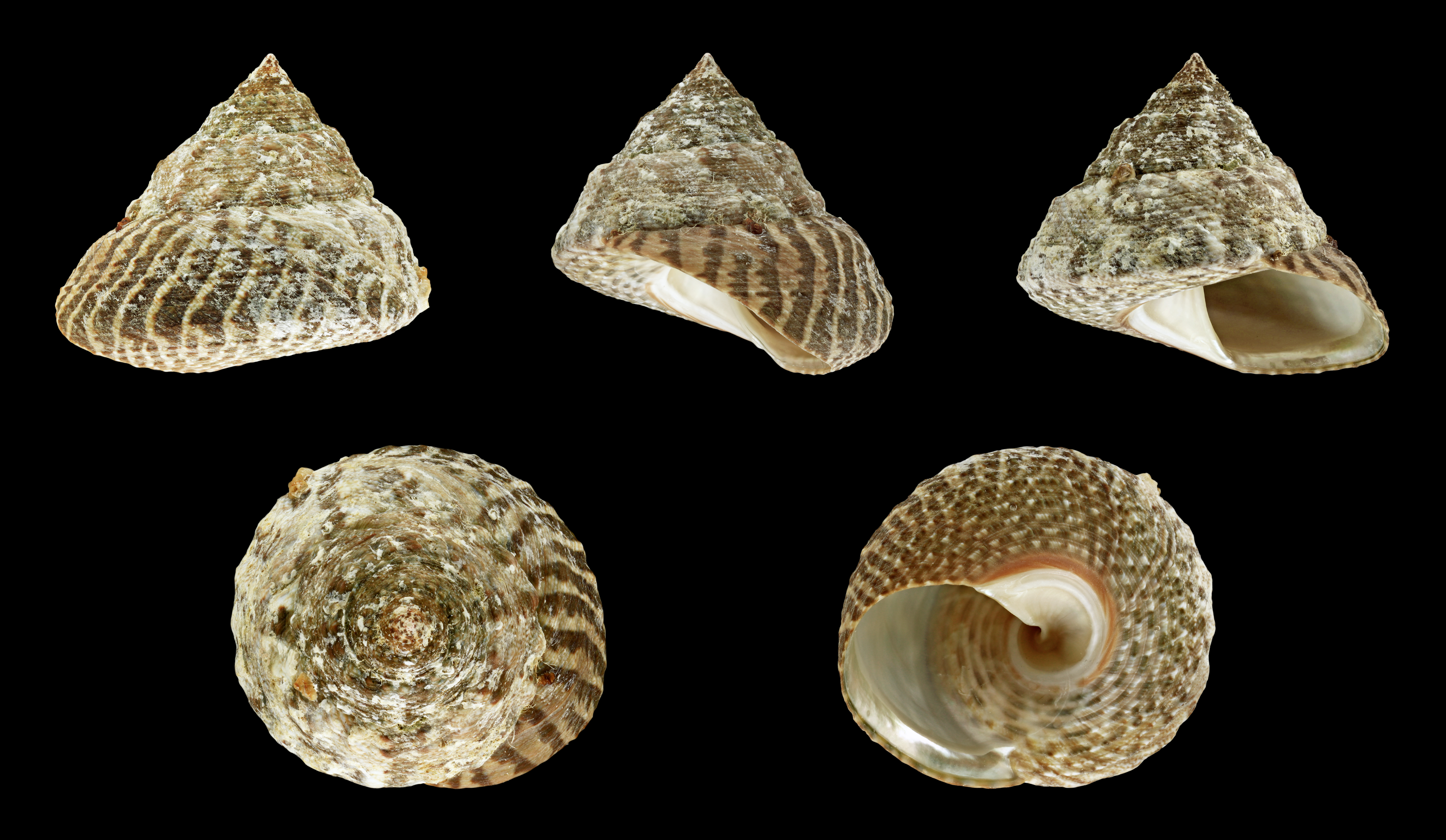
- Several views of a shell of Trochus erithreus

Scientific classification
- Kingdom: Animalia
- Phylum: Mollusca
- Class: Gastropoda
- Subclass: Vetigastropoda
- Order: Trochida
- Superfamily: Trochoidea
- Family: Trochidae
- Genus: Trochus
- Species: T. erithreus

Binomial name
- Trochus erithreus Brocchi, 1821

Synonyms
- Infundibulops erithreus (Brocchi, 1821); Infundibulum erythraeum (Brocchi, 1821); Trochus (Infundibulops) erithreus (Brocchi, 1821); Trochus erythraeus Brocchi, 1821 (incorrect subsequent spelling); Trochus erythreus [sic] (misspelling); Trochus fictilis Jonas, 1846; Trochus kochii Kiener

= Trochus erithreus =

Species of gastropod

Trochus erithreus is a species of small sea snail, a marine gastropod mollusc in the family Trochidae, the top snails.

== Description ==
The height of the shell varies between 33 mm and 35 mm, its diameter between 37 mm and 40 mm. The rather thin and inflated shell has a conical shape and is false-umbilicate. The apex is acute. The about 7 whorls are somewhat concave and generally traversed by several conspicuously granose lirae in the middle. They are a little gibbous above and below, obliquely undulate below the sutures, and frequently on the periphery also. The whole surface is more or less finely spirally lirate with subgranulose lirae. The convex base of the shell is concentrically lirate with about 7 granose narrow lirae. Their interstices are generally occupied by concentric striae. The color of the shell is cinereous grayish or pinkish, striped and maculated above with reddish; unicolored pinkish or radiately marked below. The large aperture is smooth and pearly within. The basal lip is simple. The oblique columella is very deeply inserted, its entire edge nearly straight, not dentate. The deep umbilical tract is narrow, pearly. bearing a single strong spiral white rib near its base, which does not attain the edge of the columella.

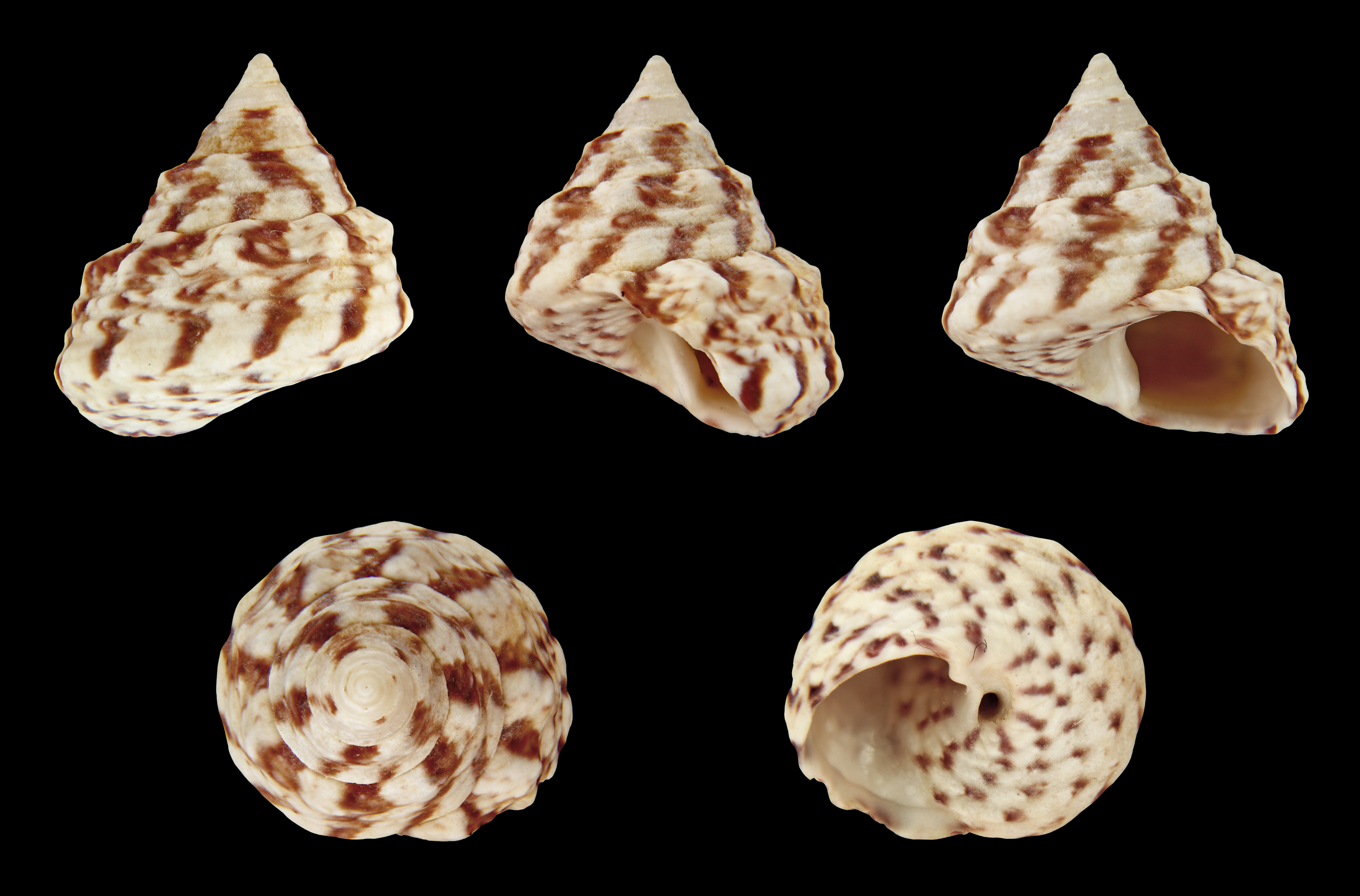
Juvenile shell

It feeds on algae and is often seen by divers.

== Distribution ==
This species occurs in the Indian Ocean (Aldabra Region), the Red Sea, the Persian Gulf (off Kuwait), the Mediterranean Sea (as a Lessepsian migrant) and in the Northern Atlantic Ocean.
