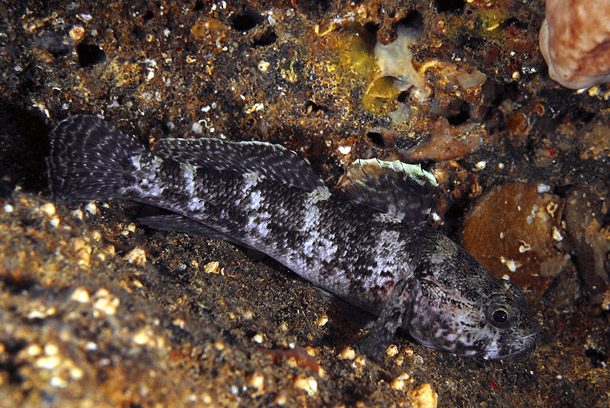
- In Tuscany, Italy

Conservation status
- Least Concern (IUCN 3.1)

Scientific classification
- Kingdom: Animalia
- Phylum: Chordata
- Class: Actinopterygii
- Division: Teleostei
- Order: Gobiiformes
- Family: Gobiidae
- Genus: Gobius
- Species: G. paganellus

Binomial name
- Gobius paganellus Linnaeus, 1758

Synonyms
- Bathygobius paganellus (Linnaeus, 1758); Gobius bicolor J. F. Gmelin, 1789; Gobius capito Valenciennes, 1837; Gobius punctipinnis Canestrini, 1862; Gobius capitonellus Kessler, 1874; Gobius albosignatus Kessler, 1874

= Rock goby =

Species of fish

The rock goby (Gobius paganellus) is a small coastal goby of eastern Atlantic waters, from Scotland to Senegal. It is also reported from the Mediterranean and Black Seas, and is an anti-Lessepsian migrant in the Gulf of Aqaba and the Red Sea. There are unconfirmed records from the area around Pointe Noire in Congo-Brazzaville.

== Description ==
The rock goby is usually black with white blotches, but they can change color, and males are much more black when guarding the eggs. The neck area lacks scales and there is a pale band on the top of the first dorsal fin. Both dorsal fins lack black spots on their leading edges. This species can reach a length of 12 centimetres (4.7 in) TL and has been known to live for ten years.

== Distribution and habitat ==
The rock goby is found in the temperate East Atlantic and the Mediterranean Sea. Its range extends from western Scotland southwards to the Azores and Senegal, most of the Mediterranean Sea and the Black Sea. It sometimes migrates through the Suez Canal to the Red Sea and the Gulf of Aqaba. It prefers rocky sea floors below the low tidemark, although it can be found in larger rock pools in Summer. It may also live in fresh or brackish water. It can be found at depths of from 0 to 15 metres (0 to 49 ft).

== Behaviour ==
The rock goby eats small crabs and amphipods, polychaetes, larva, small fish, Calanus, copepod, and mites.

== Reproduction ==
The rock goby reproduces in spring. It nests in rocky areas near the kelp forest. Up to 7000 eggs are laid under rocks and shells in a single layer (2.5 mm in height), and guarded aggressively by the male. The eggs hatch in about 19 days.
