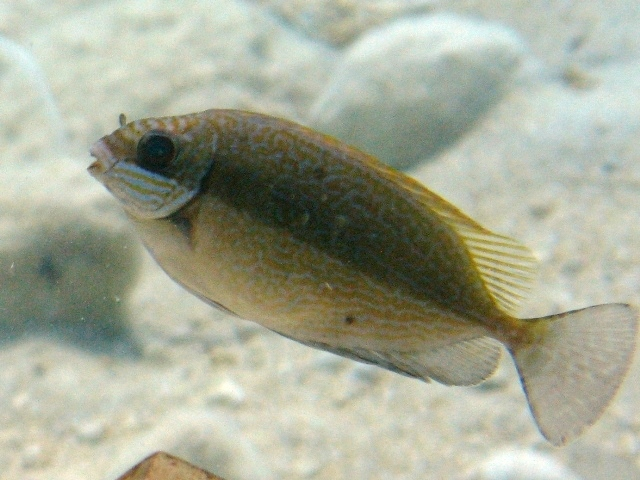
- A dusky spinefoot in Greece

Conservation status
- Least Concern (IUCN 3.1)

Scientific classification
- Kingdom: Animalia
- Phylum: Chordata
- Class: Actinopterygii
- Order: Acanthuriformes
- Family: Siganidae
- Genus: Siganus
- Species: S. luridus

Binomial name
- Siganus luridus (Rüppell, 1829)

Synonyms
- Amphacanthus luridus Rüppell, 1829; Teuthis lurida (Rüppell, 1829); Amphacanthus abhortani Valenciennes, 1835

= Dusky spinefoot =

Species of fish

The dusky spinefoot (Siganus luridus), also known as the squaretail rabbitfish, is a species of marine ray-finned fish, a rabbitfish belonging to the family Siganidae. It is native to the western Indian Ocean which has spread to the Mediterranean Sea through the Suez Canal (Lessepsian migration). Its fin spines contain venom. It is regarded as a food fish.

== Taxonomy ==
The dusky spinefoot was first formally described in 1829 as Amphacanthus luridus by the German naturalist and explorer Eduard Rüppell with the type locality given as the Red Sea. The specific name luridus means "pale yellow", this name was given to it by the collector of the type specimen, Christian Gottfried Ehrenberg, According to Achille Valenciennes in 1835, Ehrenberg described the colour of the body as yellowish-brown, with numerous very thin pale yellow lines. However, Rüppell said that the colour was bluish black with some irregular, paler spots and a yellowish ring around pupil in his description.

== Description ==
The dusky spinefoot has a compressed body which Has a depth which fits into its standard length 2.1 to 2.8 times. There is a single row of incisor-like teeth in the jaws, each with 1 or 2 lateral cusps. The dorsal fin contains 13-14 spines and 10 soft rays while the anal fin has 7 spines and 9 soft rays. The caudal fin is truncate. This species attains a maximum total length of 30 cm (12 in), although 20 cm (7.9 in) is more typical. The colour is variable, it is normally olive green to dark brown with a mottled pattern. The pectoral fins are hyaline-yellow and there are dark bars on the caudal fin

== Distribution and habitat ==
The dusky spinefoot is found on the coast of eastern Africa from Mozambique northwards into the Red Sea, and also the Comoros, Madagascar, and the Mascarene Islands. Its presence in the Persian Gulf needs to be confirmed. Recorded first in the Mediterranean Sea in 1955 off Israel, following entry via the Suez Canal, it fast expanded across the eastern Basin and now reaches westwards as far as the French Mediterranean coast and the Adriatic Sea.

It is found at depths between 2 and 40 m (6 ft 7 in and 131 ft 3 in) in waters over hard substrates, such as coral and rocky reefs.

== Biology ==
The dusky spinefoot spawns in April and from June to August when the seawater temperature is between 24 and 29 °C (75 and 84 °F), the eggs and larvae are planktonic. The larvae stay close to the surface where they feed on phytoplankton and zooplankton from 3 days old. The adults are herbivores which are active during the day, hiding in cavities during the hours of darkness. They are frequently encountered in schools but solitary individuals can also be seen, grazing on algae from the substrate. It feeds on larger brown algae species, as well as other macrophytes.

=== Venom ===
This species produces venom in the spines of its fins. In a study of the venom of a congener it was found that rabbitfish venom was similar to the venom of stonefishes. This species has been observed stopping suddenly. erecting the dorsal, anal and pelvic to present a potential threat with an array of venomous spines around its body.

=== Predators and parasites ===
The venomous spines are used for defence against predators so the highest predation pressure is on the planktonic and larval stages. Known parasites of the dusky spinefoot included the monogenean Glyphidohaptor plectocirra and Tetrancistrum polymorphum as well as the digeneans Hexangium brayi, Hexangium sigani and Progyliauchen magnacetabulum.

== Utilisation ==
The dusky spinefoot is caught using set fish traps, gillnets and beach seines, the catch is sold as fresh fish. This species has become an important species for fisheries in the Mediterranean while in other areas, such as Kenya, it is a bycatch. This species has been implicated in cases of mild ciguatera like poisoning when consumed.
