= Lessepsian migration =

Unintended migration of marine species across the Suez Canal

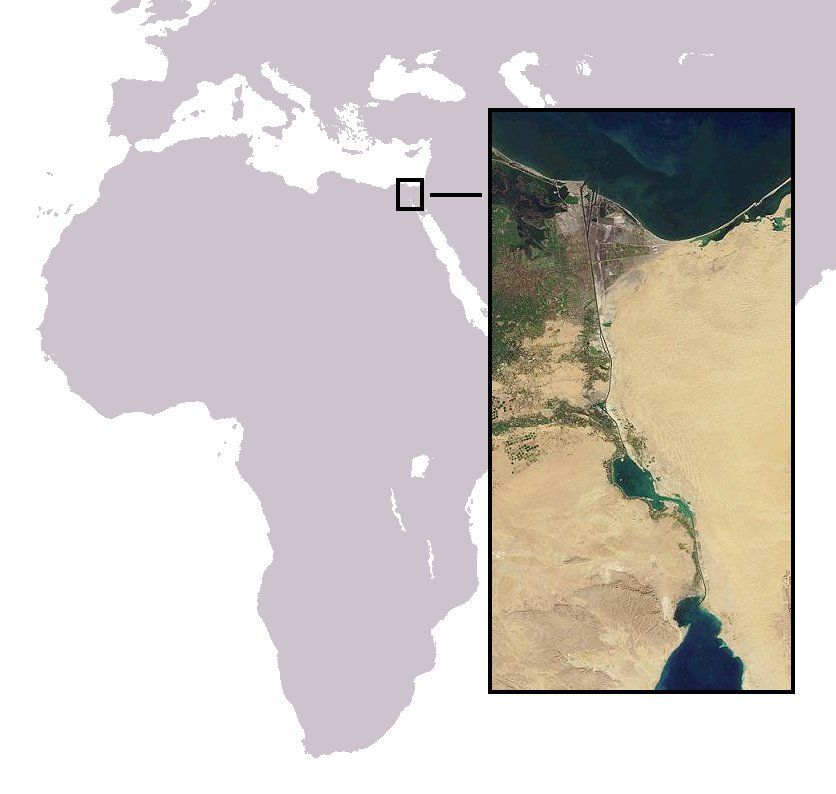
The Suez Canal, along which marine species migrate from the Red Sea to the Mediterranean Sea, in the original Lessepsian migration.

The Lessepsian migration (or Erythrean invasion) is the migration of marine species along the Suez Canal, usually from the Red Sea to the Mediterranean Sea, and more rarely in the opposite direction. When the canal was completed in 1869, fish, crustaceans, mollusks, and other marine animals and plants were exposed to an artificial passage between the two naturally separate bodies of water, and cross-contamination was made possible between formerly isolated ecosystems. The phenomenon is still occurring today. It is named after Ferdinand de Lesseps, the French diplomat in charge of the canal's construction. The term was coined by Francis Dov Por in his 1978 book.

The migration of invasive species through the Suez Canal from the Indo-Pacific region has been facilitated by many factors, both abiotic and anthropogenic, and presents significant implications for the ecological health and economic stability of the contaminated areas; of particular concern is the fisheries industry in the Eastern Mediterranean. Despite these threats, the phenomenon has allowed scientists to study an invasive event on a large scale in a short period of time, which usually takes hundreds of years in natural conditions.

== Background ==
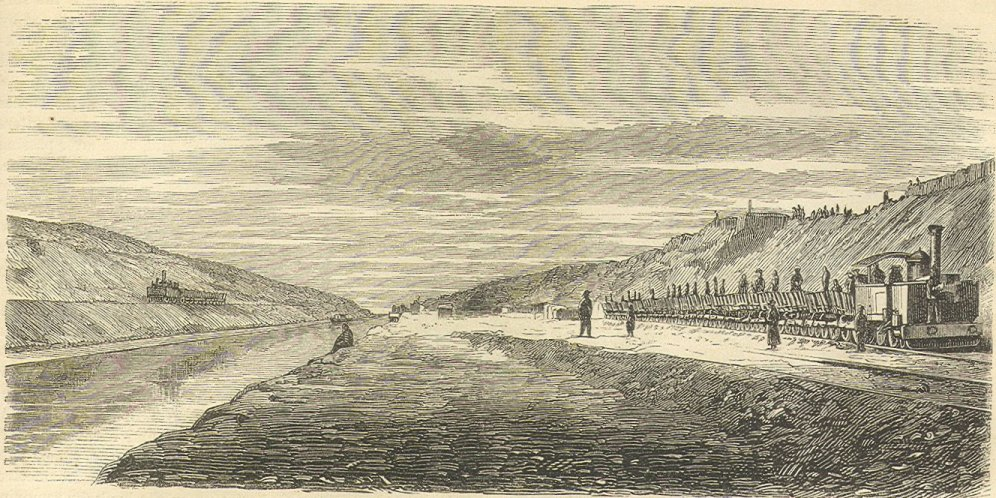
Construction of the Suez canal

The opening of the Suez Canal created the first saltwater passage between the Mediterranean Sea and the Red Sea. Constructed in 1869 to provide a more direct trade route from Europe to India and the Far East, the canal is 162.5 km (101.0 mi) long, with a depth of 10–15 m (33–49 ft) and a width varying between 200 and 300 m (660 and 980 ft).

Because the surface of the Red Sea is slightly higher in elevation than the eastern Mediterranean, the canal serves as a tidal strait by which Red Sea water pours into the Mediterranean. The Bitter Lakes, which are natural hypersaline lakes that form part of the canal, blocked the migration of Red Sea species into the Mediterranean for many decades, but as the salinity of the lakes gradually equalized with that of the Red Sea, the barrier to migration was removed, and plants and animals from the Red Sea began to colonize the eastern Mediterranean. The Red Sea, an extension of the Indian Ocean, is generally saltier and less nutrient-rich than the Mediterranean, an extension of the Atlantic Ocean, so Red Sea species, able to tolerate harsh environments, have advantages over Atlantic species in the conditions of the Eastern Mediterranean. Accordingly, most migrations between the two bodies of water are invasions of Red Sea species into the Mediterranean, and relatively few migrations occur in the opposite direction. The construction of the Aswan High Dam across the Nile River in the 1960s reduced the inflow of fresh water and nutrient-rich silt from the Nile into the eastern Mediterranean, making conditions in the eastern Mediterranean even more like those of the Red Sea, thereby increasing the impact of the invasions and facilitating the occurrence of new ones.

The Red Sea is a profusely abundant tropical marine environment sharing species in common with the eastern Indo-Pacific region, while the Mediterranean is a temperate sea with much lower productivity; the two ecosystems are extremely different in terms of structure and ecology. The Suez Canal quickly became the main pathway for the introduction of invasive species into the Eastern Mediterranean, having zoogeographic and ecological consequences far beyond what the designers foresaw. The Lessepsian migration includes hundreds of Red Sea and Indo-Pacific species that have colonized and established themselves in the Eastern Mediterranean system, causing biogeographic changes without precedent in human memory. The trend is accelerating: to take just the fish, a long-term cross-basin survey engaged by the Mediterranean Science Commission documented that in the first twenty years of the 21st century more fish species from the Indo-Pacific Ocean had reached the Mediterranean than during the entire 20th century.

As of about 2010, over 1,000 species — both vertebrates and invertebrates — native to the Red Sea had been identified in the Mediterranean Sea. It was thought that many others were as yet unidentified. From there they have spread even further afield, supplying 95% of Indo-Pacific species that have reached the Ponto-Caspian seas and increasingly rapidly. In the late 20th and early 21st centuries, the Egyptian government announced its intentions to deepen and widen the canal, which raised concerns from marine biologists, fearing this would facilitate the crossing of the canal for additional species, accelerating the invasion of Red Sea species into the Mediterranean.

== Ecological impacts ==
=== Outcompetition of natives ===
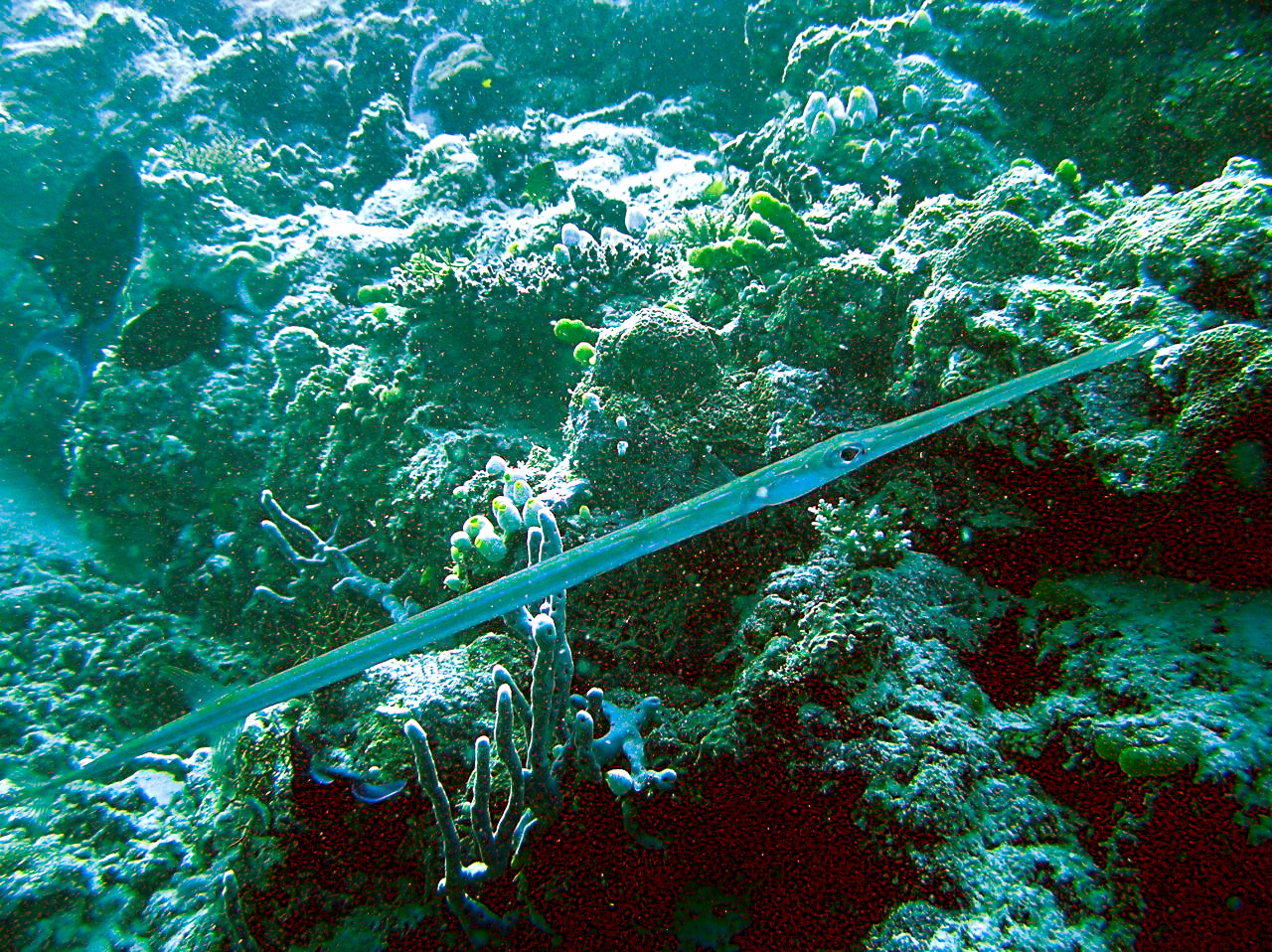
Fistularia commersonii, a Lessepsian migrant

==== Native Argyrosomus regius vs. invasive Scomberomorus commerson ====
A wide-ranging species in the eastern Atlantic and Mediterranean, the meagre Argyrosomus regius is a species indigenous to the Eastern Mediterranean and was one of the most common commercial fish in the Levant. It has since disappeared from local catches, while the narrow-barred Spanish mackerel Scomberomorus commerson, a known Lessepsian migrant, has dramatically increased in population. Studies performed on this occurrence conclude that, due to similar life histories and diets, this may be an example of an invasive migrant outcompeting a native species and occupying its niche.

==== Native Melicertus kerathurus vs. invasive prawns ====
Eight species of invasive prawns from the Erythraean Sea have been recorded in the Eastern Mediterranean. These prawns are considered highly prized in Levantine fisheries, and compose most of the prawn catch off the Mediterranean coast of Egypt, being 6% of total Egyptian landings. This high abundance of invasive prawns has led to the decline of a native penaeid prawn, Melicertus kerathurus, which supported a commercial Israeli fishery throughout the 1950s. Due to outcompetition and its habitat being overrun by these migrants, this native species has since disappeared, with resultant detrimental impacts on the commercial fishery.

=== Parasitic invaders ===
The invasion of new Red Sea species into the Mediterranean has facilitated the invasion of their associated parasites, for example the copepod Eudactylera aspera, which was found on a spinner shark, Carcharhinus brevipinna, taken off the coast of Tunisia. The copepod had originally been described from specimens taken from C. brevipinna off Madagascar and its finding in the Mediterranean has arguably confirmed the previously disputed status of C. brevipinna as a Lessepsian migrant. In addition, parasites originating in the Red Sea have shown an ability to use related native Mediterranean fish species as alternative hosts; e.g. the copepod Nipergasilus bora was known to parasitise the grey mullets Mugil cephalus and Liza carinata in the Red Sea, both taxa having been recorded as Lessepsian migrants, and was subsequently found parasitising the native Mediterranean mullets Chelon aurata and Chelon labrosus.

Sometimes, the invasion of parasites may reduce the competitive advantages that Red Sea invaders have in the Mediterranean. For example, the Indo-Pacific swimming crab Charybdis longicollis was first recorded in the Mediterranean in the mid-1950s and became dominant in silty and sandy substrates off the coast of Israel, making up to 70% of the total biomass in these habitats. Until 1992, none of the specimens collected was infected with the parasite Heterosaccus dollfusi, but in that year, a few infected crabs were collected. The parasite is a barnacle which desexes its host. Within three years, 77% of the crabs collected in Haifa Bay were infected, and the parasite had spread to southern Turkey. This rapid increase and high infection rate is attributed to the extremely high population density of the host and the year-round reproduction of the parasite. One effect of this was that the population of the Mediterranean native swimming crab Liocarcinus vernalis recovered somewhat.

=== Species displacements ===
Fisheries have been heavily affected. The goldband goatfish, Upeneus moluccensis, was first recorded in the Eastern Mediterranean in the 1930s and has since established an abundant population. Following the warm winter of 1954–1955, it increased to 83% of the Israeli catch, replacing the native red mullet, which affected the Egyptian fishery, being 3% of their total landings. The high water temperatures of this unusually warm winter may have resulted in the poor survival of red mullet juveniles, which may have allowed the goatfish population to expand into the opened niche. Native mullet have since been displaced into deeper, cooler waters, where Lessepsian migrants consist of only 20% of the catch, whereas in shallower, warmer waters, this invasive species takes up 87% of the catch. From these data, the Lessepsian migrants apparently have not adapted to the more temperate environment of the deeper areas of the basin, but have established dominant populations in the habitats most similar to the tropical sea habitats from which they came. The population of Caesio varilineata (a fusilier fish, Caesionidae), recently reported from the eastern Mediterranean Sea, may develop in a similar fashion. As of 2006 along the Mediterranean coast of Israel, over half of trawl catches are Lessepsians. Full substitution has not occurred yet, but total fishery productivity has been reduced by the invaders.

=== Food web phase shift ===
The marbled spinefoot (Siganus rivulatus) and dusky spinefoot (Siganus luridus), both indigenous Red Sea rabbitfish, were first recorded off the coast of Mandatory Palestine in 1924. In only a few decades, these schooling, herbivorous fish were able to settle in a range of habitats forming abundant populations, to the extent that George and Athanassiou, in a paper published in 1967, reported: "The millions of young abound over rocky outcropping grazing on the relatively abundant early summer algal cover". By 2004, a study on these species found that they comprise 80% of the abundance of herbivorous fish in the shallow coastal sites of Lebanon. They have been able to create marked phase shifts within the food web on multiple levels. Prior to the arrival of these Lessepsian migrants, the herbivores filled a small ecological role within the Eastern Mediterranean system. Therefore, with such a high influx of herbivorous species in a small period of time, this phenomenon has normalised the food web, increasing the rate at which algae are consumed and serving as a major prey item for large predators. Further, these Red Sea migrants are affecting fisheries by outcompeting native fish of high commercial value, such as the seabream Boops boops. A nonindigenous species of mussel – Brachidontes pharaonis – from the Indo-Pacific has also proliferated. This mussel, which has a thicker shell than that of the native mussel, has created a change in predation patterns, since they are more difficult for predators to handle.

=== Secondary invasions via biotic vectors ===
Holobenthic foraminifera have been recorded in the Mediterranean Sea since the opening of the Suez Canal, and several species have successfully established persistent and sustainable populations.

A 2017 study demonstrated that foraminifera can survive passage through the digestive system of the invasive herbivorous rabbitfishes Siganus rivulatus and S. luridus. These fish from the Red Sea ingest foraminifera while grazing and have expanded westwards throughout the Mediterranean. This suggests that rabbitfishes function as vectors. Incomplete digestion followed by defecation of viable individuals appears to facilitate the long-distance dispersal and colonization of foraminifera in the Mediterranean.

== Anti-Lessepsian migration ==
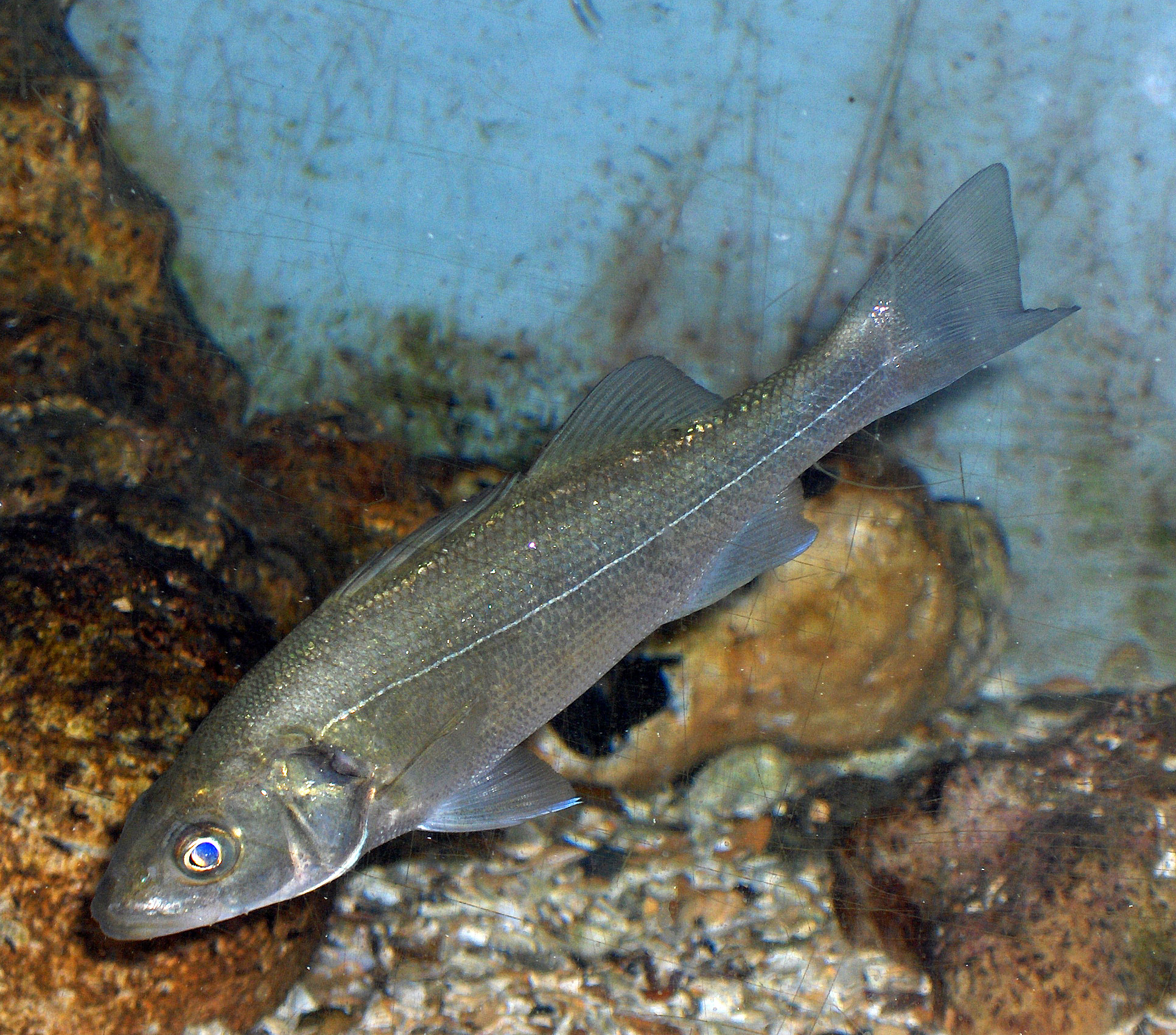
European seabass: one of the few anti-Lessepsian migrants

Only a comparatively few species have colonised the Red Sea from the Mediterranean; these are called anti-Lessepsian migrants. As the predominant flow of the canal is from south to north, this acts against the southward movement of Mediterranean species, and as stated above, the Red Sea has higher salinity, fewer nutrients, and a much more diverse biota than the Eastern Mediterranean. Some of the anti-Lessepsian migrants such as the sea star Sphaerodiscus placenta are found only in specialised habitats such as the lagoon of El Bilaiyim, which lies 180 km (110 mi) south of the southern entrance to the Suez Canal, but is much more saline than the surrounding waters of the Gulf of Suez.

The sea slug Biuve fulvipunctata was described from waters around Japan and is widespread in the eastern Indian Ocean and western Pacific. It was first identified in the Mediterranean in 1961, and was seen in the Red Sea in 2005, most likely as a result of anti-Lessepsian migration. Among the fish species that have been confirmed as anti-Lessepsian migrants are peacock blenny (Salaria pavo), Solea aegyptiaca, Mediterranean moray (Muraena helena), the rock goby (Gobius paganellus), the meagre (Argyrosomus regius), the comber (Serranus cabrilla), European seabass (Dicentrarchus labrax), and spotted seabass (Dicentrarchus punctatus).

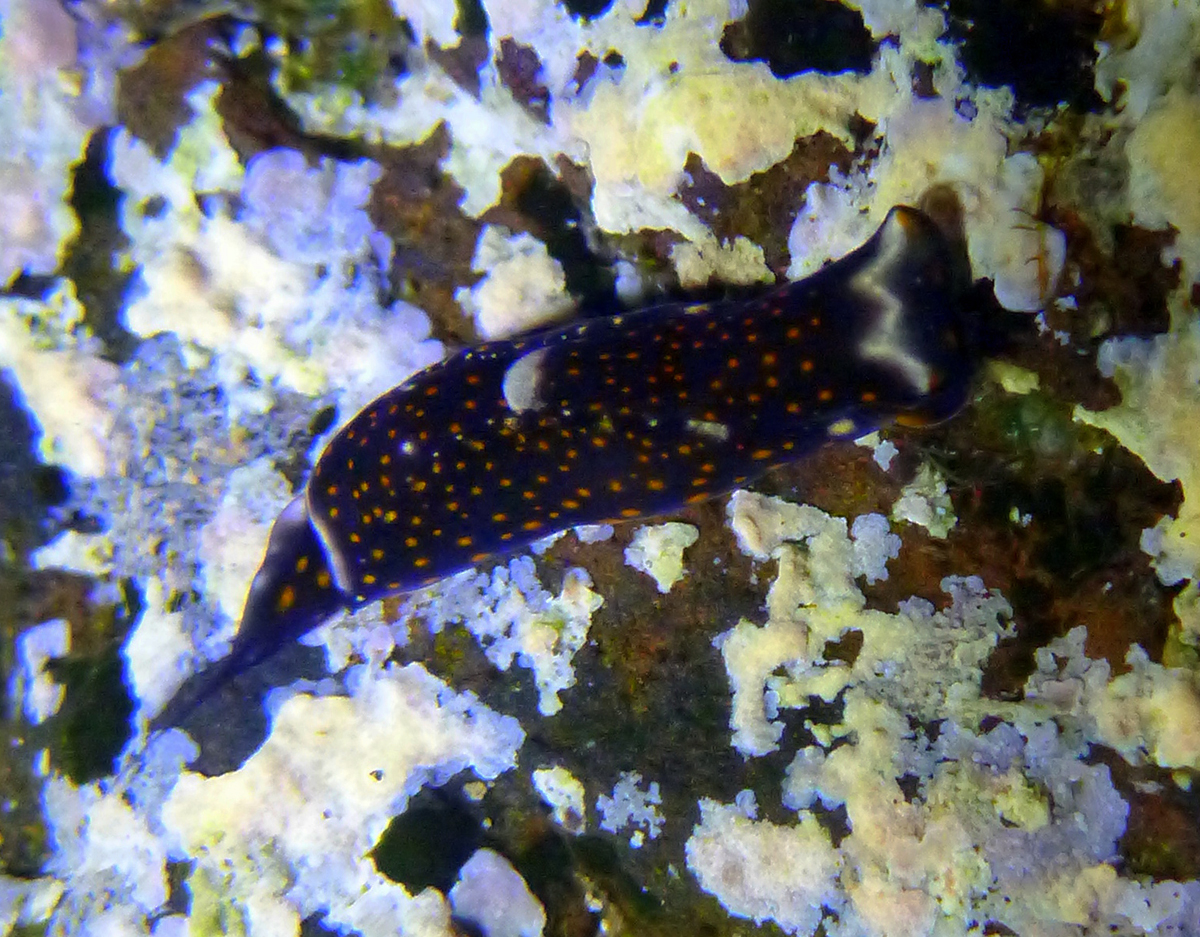
Biuve fulvipunctata

== Other examples ==
=== North America ===
The sea lamprey reached Lake Ontario from the Atlantic Ocean through shipping canals and was recorded for the first time in Lake Ontario in the 1830s, but Niagara Falls was a barrier to their further spread. The deepening of the Welland Canal in 1919 allowed the sea lamprey to bypass the barrier created by the falls, and by 1938, sea lampreys had been recorded in all of the Great Lakes.

The alewife (Alosa pseudoharengus), a species of shad from the Western Atlantic, invaded the Great Lakes by using the Welland Canal to bypass Niagara Falls. They colonised the Great Lakes and became abundant mostly in Lake Huron and Lake Michigan, reaching their peak abundance by the 1950s and 1980s.

=== Europe ===
The white-eye bream (Ballerus sapa) has invaded the Vistula River basin by migrating along the Dnieper–Bug Canal in Belarus, which connects the Vistula drainage basin with that of the Dnieper River.

=== Panama ===
A small number of species have used the Panama Canal to move from the Atlantic Ocean to the Pacific Ocean, and vice versa. Six species of Atlantic fish were recorded on the Pacific side of the canal, and three species of Pacific fish were found on the Atlantic side of the canal. The Atlantic fish included Lupinoblennius dispar, Hypleurochilus aequipinnis, Barbulifer ceuthoecus, Oostethus lineatus and Lophogobius cyprinoides, while the Pacific species moving to the Atlantic included Gnathanodon speciosus. The Gatun Lake's freshwater environment forms a barrier to the interchange of marine species.

== See also ==
- List of Lessepsian migrants
