= Themiste cymodoceae =

Scientific classification
- Kingdom: Animalia
- Phylum: Annelida
- Class: Sipuncula
- Order: Golfingiida
- Family: Themistidae
- Genus: Themiste
- Species: T. cymodoceae

Binomial name
- Themiste cymodoceae (Edmonds, 1956)

Synonyms
- Dendrostomum cymodoceae Edmonds, 1956

Species of worm

Themiste cymodoceae is a species of unsegmented benthic marine worm in the phylum Sipuncula, the peanut worms. It is native to shallow waters around Australia and in the South China Sea where it lives in a cavity it creates among seagrass roots and in empty oyster shells.

== Description ==
The body of this peanut worm is divided into an unsegmented, bulbous trunk and a narrower, anterior section, called the "introvert". The tip of the introvert bears an elaborate "crown" of tentacles. The body wall is smooth and pale grey. When the worm is contracted, the body wall is slippery, possibly lubricated by secretions from glandular cells in the dermis and epidermis.

== Distribution ==
Themiste cymodoceae is native to Australia where it inhabits the subtidal zone as well as the South China Sea.

== Ecology ==
Themiste cymodoceae is unusual among peanut worms in that it lives among the tangled root masses of Amphibolis, a seagrass found in the shallow subtidal zone, and sometimes among the roots of Zostera. The worm gradually excavates a chamber with compacted walls in which it lives permanently, protruding its introvert to feed. It also lives in empty oyster shells.

Unlike most peanut worms, which are deposit feeders, T. cymodoceae is a filter feeder, expanding its elaborate tentacular-crown to feed on floating particles such as detritus, faecal material, bacteria, algae and small invertebrates.

T. cymodoceae is a tough and hardy species and has been used in research. The large surface area of the tentacles is probably used as a respiratory surface as it is in the related Themiste hennahi. T. cymodoceae seems capable of living for prolonged periods without oxygen, remaining alive for several days in boiled distilled water from which oxygen was excluded, although after this time, the oxygen stored in its blood cells was becoming depleted; it even survived in paraffin oil.
