= Nephasoma rimicola =

Scientific classification
- Kingdom: Animalia
- Phylum: Annelida
- Class: Sipuncula
- Order: Golfingiida
- Family: Golfingiidae
- Genus: Nephasoma
- Species: N. rimicola

Binomial name
- Nephasoma rimicola (Gibbs, 1973)

Synonyms
- Golfingia rimicola Gibbs, 1973; Nephasoma rimicola (Gibbs, 1973)

Species of peanut worm

Nephasoma rimicola is a marine invertebrate belonging to the phylum Sipuncula, the peanut worms. This worm occurs in the northeastern Atlantic Ocean.

== Description ==
Nephasoma rimicola grows to a maximum length of about 6 cm (2.4 in). Like all peanut worms it has a cylindrical trunk and a narrower, retractable anterior section known as the introvert. The mouth is at the end of the introvert which can be extended to feed or retracted into the body at other times. In this species the trunk is about three times as long as it is wide with the introvert being a similar length. The introvert is retracted by a single, ventral pair of retractor muscles. Near its tip, the introvert has many hook-like spines arranged in six to ten rings, and the mouth is surrounded by well-formed tentacles; there are eight of these in juveniles but more develop as the worm grows, with sixteen being present in most adults and twenty in the largest individuals. The rings of hooked spines and the well-developed tentacles help to distinguish this species from the usually much smaller Nephasoma minutum which occupies similar habitats.

== Distribution ==
Nephasoma rimicola occurs in the northeastern Atlantic Ocean. It has been found in northern Spain and in several shallow water locations around the British Isles, including west of the Isle of Wight, the estuary of the River Exe in north Devon and Milford Haven in south Pembrokeshire where it inhabits crevices in the rock. It also occurs off the coast of southern Spain in deeper water, between 350 and 720 m (1,150 and 2,360 ft).

== Ecology ==
Peanut worms are detritivores. The introvert is extended along the surface of the substrate and organic particles are gathered by the oral tentacles and moved to the mouth when the introvert is drawn in. The gut is long and J-shaped, with the anus on the dorsal surface of the front end of the trunk. The introvert is normally kept retracted except when the worm is feeding.
