= Phascolosoma granulatum =

Scientific classification
- Kingdom: Animalia
- Phylum: Annelida
- Class: Sipuncula
- Order: Phascolosomatida
- Family: Phascolosomatidae
- Genus: Phascolosoma
- Species: P. granulatum

Binomial name
- Phascolosoma granulatum Leuckart, 1828

Synonyms
- List: Dendrostomum huxleyii M'Intosh, 1866; Phascolosoma fasciatum Baird, 1868; Phascolosoma granulata Leuckart, 1828; Phascolosoma jeffreysii Baird, 1868; Phascolosoma laeve (Cuvier, 1817); Phascolosoma lovénii Koren & Danielssen, 1876; Phascolosoma multitorquatum (Quatrefages, 1865); Phascolosoma papillosum (Thompson, 1840); Phascolosoma verrucosum (Cuvier, 1817); Phascolosomum granulatum Leuckart, 1828; Phascolosomum laeve (Cuvier, 1817); Phascolosomum papillosum (Thompson, 1840); Phymosoma granulatum (Leuckart, 1828); Phymosoma herouardi Hérubel, 1903; Phymosoma loveni (Koren & Danielssen, 1876); Phymosoma lovenii (Koren & Danielssen, 1876); Physcosoma granulatum (Leuckart, 1828); Physcosoma loveni (Koren & Danielssen, 1876); Physcosoma lovenii (Koren & Danielssen, 1876); Siponculus levis Cuvier, 1817; Siponculus verrucosus Cuvier, 1817; Sipunculus (Phascolosoma) verrucosus Cuvier, 1817; Sipunculus (Phymosomum) multitorquatus Quatrefages, 1865; Sipunculus (Phymosomum) papillosus Thompson, 1840; Sipunculus flavus Risso, 1826; Sipunculus genuensis de Blainville, 1827; Sipunculus laevis Cuvier, 1817; Sipunculus papillosus Thompson, 1840; Sipunculus tigrinus Risso, 1826; Sipunculus tuberculatus de Blainville, 1827; Sipunculus verrucosus Cuvier, 1817; Syrinx papillosus (Thompson, 1840)

Species of peanut worm

Phascolosoma granulatum is a species of peanut worm in the family Phascolosomatidae. It is found in shallow water in the northeastern Atlantic Ocean and the Mediterranean Sea.

== Description ==
Phascolosoma granulatum is a moderately large peanut worm growing to a length of 100 mm (4 in). The trunk is robust and tapers towards the posterior. The eversible introvert has a crescent-shaped bundle of 12 to 60 tentacles near its tip; these tentacles are located above the mouth and surround the large nuchal organ. Below the oral disc is a swollen collar with up to 60 rings of curved hooks with broad triangular bases. The posterior rings are often partially worn away. The surface of the trunk is covered with dome-shaped papillae (fleshy projections from the body wall) of various sizes, each tipped with a dark coloured ring. The largest papillae are at the base of the introvert and at the foot of the trunk and are often a darker colour than the remainder. Small individual worms tend to have dark banding on the introvert. In general the colouring and appearance of this species is quite variable which probably explains why it has so many synonyms.

== Distribution and habitat ==
Phascolosoma granulatum is native to the northeastern Atlantic Ocean and the Mediterranean Sea. It has been recorded in Norway but its main range extends from the British Isles southwards to the Cape Verde Islands and the Mediterranean Sea. In the British Isles, it is mainly found on the western coast of Ireland as well as in Shetland, Orkney and the Hebrides, and sporadically elsewhere. It burrows in soft sediments, such as muddy sand and gravel, intertidally and to a depth of about 90 m (300 ft); it conceals itself under rocks and in crevices and is often associated with the red crustose algae Lithothamnion. Reports that it occurs in the Indian Ocean are now thought to refer to Phascolosoma stephensoni.
