= Onchnesoma =

Scientific classification
- Kingdom: Animalia
- Phylum: Annelida
- Class: Sipuncula
- Order: Golfingiida
- Family: Phascolionidae
- Genus: Onchnesoma; Koren & Danielssen, 1875

Species
- 4 (see text)

Genus of worms

Onchnesoma is one of the two genera that constitute the family Phascolionidae of Phylum Sipuncula, described by Koren and Danielssen established in 1873 as the type species to Onchnesoma steenstrupii.

== Description ==
The species of this genus are usually small in size (with a trunk of less than 1 cm in length). The introverted is much longer than the trunk. The body wall muscle layers presents continuous. The disc may present oral tentacles (usually less than 10 and about 8 mm. in length) arranged around the mouth, but those tentacles can be reduced in size or completely absent. The retractor muscle system is a highly modified introverted form fused to form a muscle retractor. The anus is located in the distal half of introverted. Gallbladder contractile is rarely observed and if present is without villi. They have a single nephridium.

== Species ==
- Onchnesoma intermedium Murina, 1976
- Onchnesoma magnibathum Cutler, 1969
- Onchnesoma squamatum (Koren y Danielssen, 1875)
- Onchnesoma steenstrupii Koren y Danielssen, 1875
