= Thysanocardia procera =

Scientific classification
- Kingdom: Animalia
- Phylum: Annelida
- Class: Sipuncula
- Order: Golfingiida
- Family: Golfingiidae
- Genus: Thysanocardia
- Species: T. procera

Binomial name
- Thysanocardia procera (Möbius, 1875)

Synonyms
- Golfingia procera Möbius, 1875; Phascolosoma catharinae Grube, 1868; Phascolosoma procerum Möbius, 1875

Species of peanut worm

Thysanocardia procera is a marine invertebrate belonging to the phylum Sipuncula, the peanut worms. It is a cylindrical, unsegmented worm with a crown of tentacles around the mouth. It is native to shallow seas in the northeastern Atlantic Ocean.

== Taxonomy ==
This peanut worm was first described in 1875 by the German zoologist Karl Möbius, who placed it in the genus Golfingia, naming it Golfingia procera. Subsequently, it was moved to Thysanocardia, which was considered to be a subgenus of Golfingia. In a revision of Thysanocardia in 1983, the subgenus was elevated to full genus rank, with only three species being retained, T procera, a North Atlantic species, the widely distributed T. catherinae, and T. nigra with a north Pacific distribution.

== Description ==
Like other sipunculans, the body of Thysanocardia procera is divided into a wide posterior end known as the trunk and a narrower, extendable anterior end known as the introvert. The introvert is several times as long as the trunk when extended, and the whole animal may reach a length of 50 or 60 mm (2.0 or 2.4 in). The surface of trunk and introvert is finely wrinkled, with a dusting of tiny papillae. The nephridiopores and the anus are at the anterior end of the trunk. The oral disc surrounds the mouth at the tip of the introvert. It consists of eight bundles each containing six to ten tentacles, arranged in radial or longitudinal rows. A further six to ten short tentacles surrounding the nuchal organ, which has two lobes separated by a groove. There are no hooks on the introvert in this species.

== Distribution ==
This peanut worm occurs in the northeastern Atlantic Ocean. Its range includes the Skagerrak and the northern part of the North Sea, but not the southern part, nor the English Channel. It also occurs in the northwestern Atlantic between about 34°N and 40°N, and has been reported from California, but its precise distribution is unclear. It is found in sandy or silty sediments at depths of from around 2 to 200 m (10 to 660 ft).
