= P. gouldii =

P. gouldii may refer to:

- Pectinaria gouldii, a worm species in the genus Pectinaria
- Phascolopsis gouldii, a sipunculid worm species in the genus Phascolopsis
- Pseudomys gouldii, the Gould's mouse, a mouse found in eastern inland Australia

== See also ==
- Gouldii (disambiguation)
