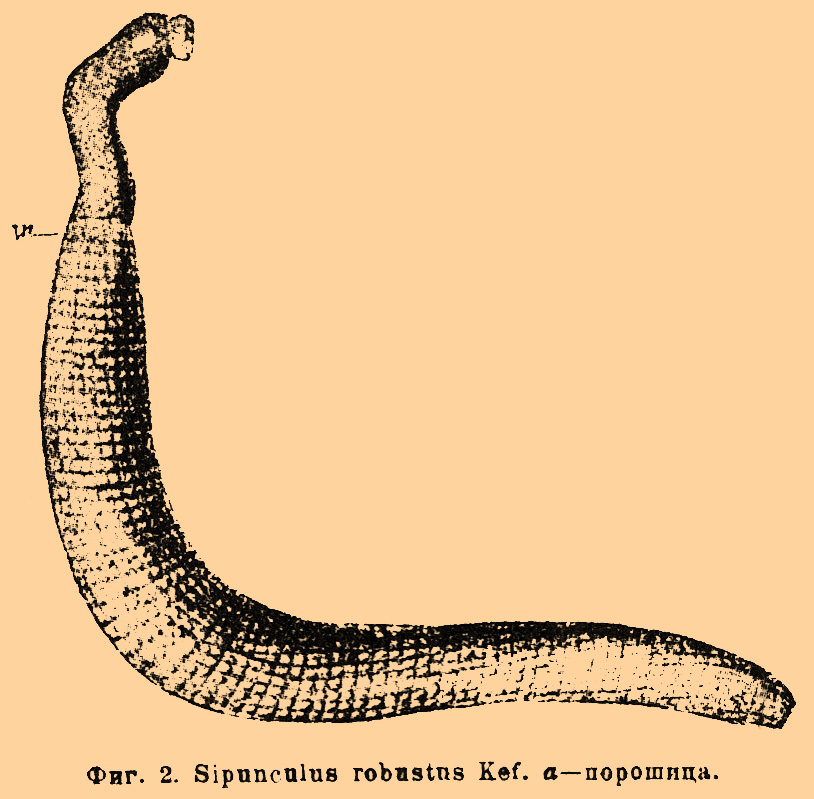

Scientific classification
- Kingdom: Animalia
- Phylum: Annelida
- Class: Sipuncula
- Order: Golfingiida
- Family: Sipunculidae
- Genus: Sipunculus
- Species: S. robustus

Binomial name
- Sipunculus robustus Keferstein, 1865

Synonyms
- Sipunculus angasi Edmonds, 1955; Sipunculus angasii Baird, 1868; Sipunculus gravieri Hérubel, 1904; Sipunculus robustus Keferstein, 1865

= Sipunculus robustus =

Species of peanut worm

Sipunculus robustus is a species of unsegmented benthic marine worm in the phylum Sipuncula, the peanut worms.

== Distribution ==
This peanut worm is found in the northwestern Indian Ocean and the Red Sea, but not the Mediterranean Sea, and also it is found on the Atlantic side of Central America, but not on the Pacific side.
