= Cloeosiphon =

Scientific classification
- Kingdom: Animalia
- Phylum: Annelida
- Class: Sipuncula
- Order: Aspidosiphonida
- Family: Aspidosiphonidae
- Genus: Cloeosiphon; Grübe, 1868

Genus of annelid worms

Cloeosiphon is a genus of worms belonging to the family Aspidosiphonidae.

The species of this genus are found in Indian and Pacific Ocean.

Species:

- Cloeosiphon aspergillus (Quatrefages, 1865)
