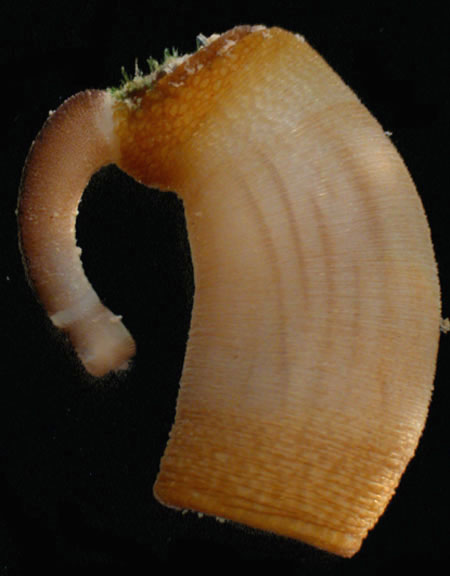
- Aspidosiphon steenstrupii

Scientific classification
- Kingdom: Animalia
- Phylum: Annelida
- Class: Sipuncula
- Order: Aspidosiphonida
- Family: Aspidosiphonidae; Quatrefages, 1865

Genera
- Aspidosiphon Diesing, 1851; Cloeosiphon Grube, 1868; Lithacrosiphon Shipley, 1902

= Aspidosiphonidae =

Family of peanut worms

Aspidosiphonidae is a family of peanut worms. It is the only family in the monotypic order Aspidosiphonida, which is in the class Phascolosomatidea.

== Description ==
The family Aspidosiphonidae is characterized by an oval disk with short tentacles, arranged in a crescent-shape made of an enclosed nuchal organ. It has a canal of sacs in the coelom, lying in a continuous band. The anal and caudal shield (at the anterior end) are both made up, not of chitin, but of a horny protein. It is of note that most, but not all, of the Aspidosiphonidae family has a caudal shield. The family also has two nephridia.

== Species ==
=== Aspidosiphon ===
- Aspidosiphon albus Murina, 1967
- Aspidosiphon coyi de Quatrefages, 1865
- Aspidosiphon elegans (Chamisso and Eysenhardt, 1821)
- Aspidosiphon exiguus Edmonds 1974
- Aspidosiphon fischeri Broeke, A. ten, 1925
- Aspidosiphon gosnoldi Cutler, E., 1981
- Aspidosiphon gracilis (Baird, 1868)
- Aspidosiphon laevis de Quatrefages, 1865
- Aspidosiphon mexicanus Murina, 1967
- Aspidosiphon misakiensis Ikeda 1904
- Aspidosiphon muelleri Diesing 1851
- Aspidosiphon parvulus Gerould, 1913
- Aspidosiphon planoscutatus Murina, 1968
- Aspidosiphon spiralis Sluiter, 1902
- Aspidosiphon steenstrupii Diesing, 1859
- Aspidosiphon tenuis Sluiter, 1886
- Aspidosiphon thomassini Cutler and Cutler, 1979
- Aspidosiphon venabulum Selenka & Bulow, 1883
- Aspidosiphon zinni Cutler, 1969

=== Cloeosiphon ===
- Cloeosiphon aspergillus (de Quatrefages, 1865)

=== Lithacrosiphon ===
- Lithacrosiphon cristatus (Sluiter, 1902)
- Lithacrosiphon maldivensis Shipley 1902
