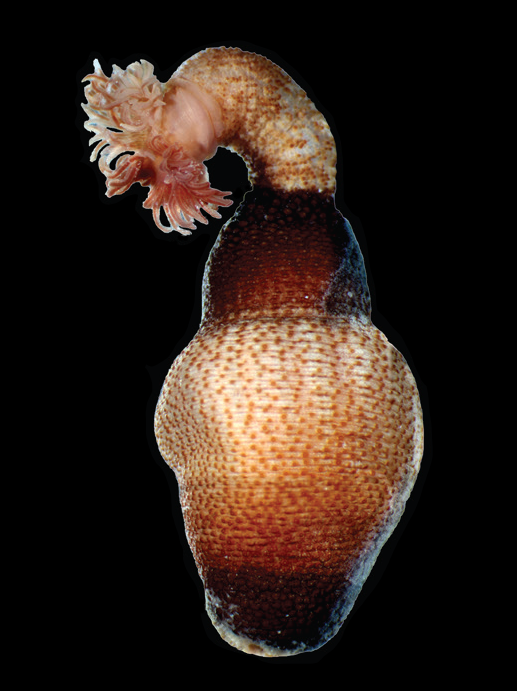

Scientific classification
- Kingdom: Animalia
- Phylum: Annelida
- Class: Sipuncula
- Order: Phascolosomatida
- Family: Phascolosomatidae
- Genus: Antillesoma
- Species: A. antillarum

Binomial name
- Antillesoma antillarum (Grube, 1858)

= Antillesoma antillarum =

Species of Peanut Worm

Antillesoma antillarum is the type species of the peanut worm genus Antillesoma. The genus belongs to the family Phascolosomatidae.

== Synonymy ==
- Aspidosiphon mokyevskii (Murina, 1964)
- Golfingia (Thysanocardia) mokyevskii Murina, 1964
- Golfingia mokyevskii Murina, 1964
- Phascolion antillarum
- Phascolosoma (Aedematosomum) antillarum Grube, 1858
- Phascolosoma (Antillesoma) antillarum Grube, 1858
- Phascolosoma (Antillesoma) asser (Selenka & De Man, 1883)
- Phascolosoma (Antillesoma) pelmum (Selenka & De Man, 1883)
- Phascolosoma (Antillesoma) schmidti Murina, 1975
- Phascolosoma (Rueppellisoma) gaudens (Lanchester, 1905)
- Phascolosoma (Rueppellisoma) onomichianum (Ikeda, 1904)
- Phascolosoma (Rueppellisoma) simile (Chen & Yeh, 1958)
- Phascolosoma (Rueppellisoma) weldonii (Shipley, 1892)
- Phascolosoma aethiops Baird, 1868
- Phascolosoma antillarum Grube, 1858
- Phascolosoma asser (Selenka & De Man, 1883)
- Phascolosoma fuscum Keferstein, 1862
- Phascolosoma glans (De Quatrefages, 1865)
- Phascolosoma immodestum (De Quatrefages, 1865)
- Phascolosoma nigriceps Baird, 1868
- Phascolosoma onomichianum (Ikeda, 1904)
- Phascolosoma pelma (Selenka & De Man, 1883)
- Phascolosoma pelmum (Selenka & De Man, 1883)
- Phascolosoma similis (Chen & Yeh, 1958)
- Phymosoma antillarum (Grube, 1858)
- Phymosoma asser Selenka & De Man, in Selenka, de Man & Bülow, 1883
- Phymosoma onomichianum Ikeda, 1904
- Phymosoma pelma Selenka & De Man, in Selenka, de Man & Bülow, 1883
- Physcosoma antillarum (Grube, 1858)
- Physcosoma asser (Selenka & De Man, 1883)
- Physcosoma gaudens Lanchester, 1905
- Physcosoma onomichianum (Ikeda, 1904)
- Physcosoma pelma (Selenka & De Man, 1883)
- Physcosoma similis Chen & Yeh, 1958
- Physcosoma weldonii Shipley, 1892
- Sipunculus (Aedematosomum) glans De Quatrefages, 1865
- Sipunculus (Aedematosomum) immodestus De Quatrefages, 1865

== Distribution ==
This species is considered a cosmopolitan species. They are widespread in tropical and subtropical waters. It has been reported in the western Atlantic and the Caribbean from Florida to Brazil, in the eastern Atlantic in Sierra Leone.

=== Habitat ===
Antillesoma antillarum has been found inhabiting mollusc shell middens. They accompany and associate with the following species of sipunculids: Aspidosiphon albus, A. Parvulus, A. fischeri, Temistes lageniformis, y Nephasoma pellucidum.
