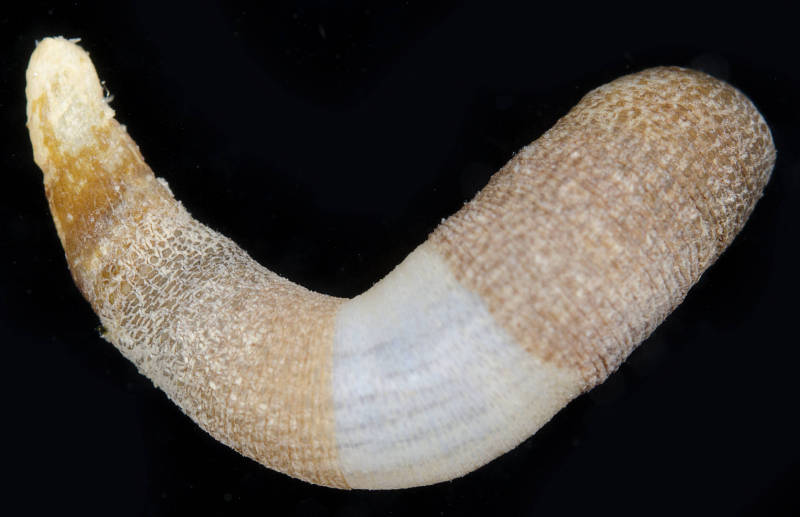
- Lithacrosiphon cristatus

Scientific classification
- Kingdom: Animalia
- Phylum: Annelida
- Class: Sipuncula
- Order: Aspidosiphonida
- Family: Aspidosiphonidae
- Genus: Lithacrosiphon; Shipley, 1902

Species
- Lithacrosiphon cristatus; Lithacrosiphon maldivensis; Lithacrosiphon uniscutatus

= Lithacrosiphon =

Genus of worms

Lithacrosiphon is a genus of worms belonging to the family Aspidosiphonidae.

The species of this genus are found in all world oceans.

Species:

- Lithacrosiphon cristatus (Sluiter, 1902)
  - Subsp. L. c. cristatus (Sluiter, 1902)
  - Subsp. L. c. lakshadweepensis Halder, 1991
- Lithacrosiphon maldivensis Shipley, 1902
- Lithacrosiphon uniscutatus Fischer, 1902

== History ==
L. cristatus was redescribed and included the formerly distinct species L. altriconus, L. gurjanovae, L. indicus, and L. odhneri.

L. uniscutatus was redescribed and included L. kukenthali and L. poritidis.
