= G. vulgaris =

G. vulgaris may refer to:

- Gaidropsarus vulgaris, the three-bearded rockling, a fish species found in European waters
- Galaxias vulgaris, a galaxiid fish found on the South Island of New Zealand
- Golfingia vulgaris, the peanut worm, a marine invertebrate species

== Synonyms ==
- Globularia vulgaris, a synonym for Globularia trichosantha, an ornamental plant species

== See also ==
- Vulgaris (disambiguation)
