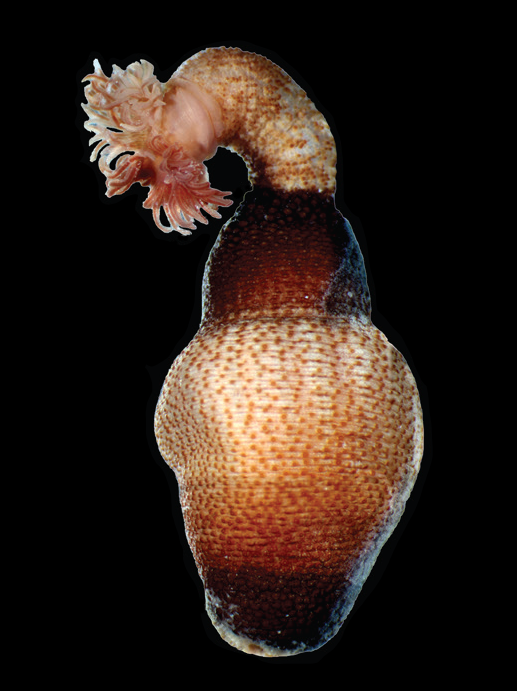
- Antillesoma antillarum

Scientific classification
- Kingdom: Animalia
- Phylum: Annelida
- Class: Sipuncula
- Order: Phascolosomatida
- Family: Phascolosomatidae
- Genus: Antillesoma (Stephen & Edmonds, 1972)

Type species
- Antillesoma antillarum (Grube, 1858)

Species
- Antillesoma antillarum; Antillesoma mexicanum

Synonyms
- Phascolosoma (Aedematosomum) (Quatrefages, 1865); Phascolosoma (Antillesoma) Stephen & Edmonds, 1972; Sipunculus (Aedematosomum) Quatrefages, 1865

= Antillesoma =

Genus of peanut worms

Antillesoma is a genus of peanut worms (Phylum Sipuncula). The genus belongs to the family Phascolosomatidae. Antillesoma was described in 1973 by Stephen and Edmonds.

== Species ==
The following species are recognised:

- Antillesoma antillarum (Grube, 1858)
- Antillesoma mexicanum Silva-Morales, López-Aquino, Islas-Villanueva, Ruiz-Escobar & Bastida-Zavala, 2019
