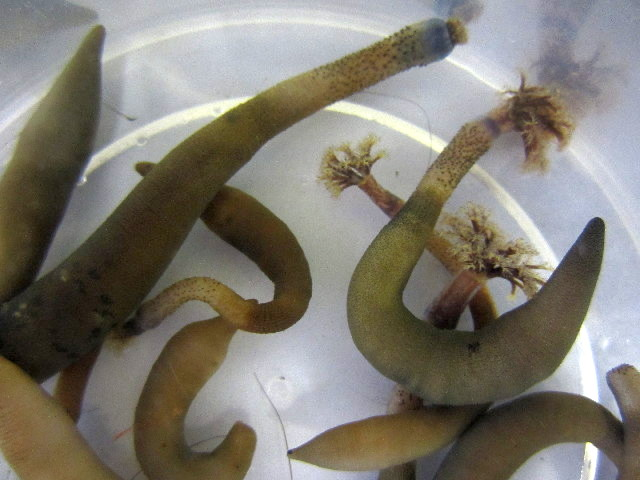

Scientific classification
- Kingdom: Animalia
- Phylum: Annelida
- Class: Sipuncula
- Order: Golfingiida
- Family: Themistidae
- Genus: Themiste
- Species: T. pyroides

Binomial name
- Themiste pyroides (Chamberlin, 1919)

Synonyms
- Dendrostoma hexadactylum Satô, 1930; Dendrostoma petraeum Fisher, 1928; Dendrostoma pyroides Chamberlin, 1919; Dendrostomum hexadactylum Satô, 1930; Themiste (Themiste) hexadactyla (Satô, 1930); Themiste (Themiste) maculosum Popkov, 1993; Themiste hexadactyla (Satô, 1930); Themiste maculosa Popkov, 1993

= Themiste pyroides =

Species of worm

Themiste pyroides is a species of unsegmented benthic marine worm in the class Sipuncula, the peanut worms. It occurs in the intertidal zone and shallow water in the western Atlantic Ocean and the northeastern Pacific Ocean. It lives in crevices and under rocks, extending its "crown" of branching tentacles into the surrounding water to feed.

== Description ==
Themiste pyroides is a large peanut worm. It has a cylindrical or spindle-shaped body and an extensible introvert at the tip of which is an elaborate "crown" of branching tentacles. The cuticle is covered by tiny papillae but seems smooth. The introvert is longer than the body and is fully retractable into the body. The crown consists of six dichotomously branching tentacles surrounding the mouth, the branches bearing pinnules, used by the worm for filter feeding (most sipunculids are deposit feeders). The body is yellowish-brown to dark brown, the collar (region of the introvert just below the crown) is smooth and blotched with violet, the tentacles are similarly coloured and the pinnules contain specks of purple pigment. In its fully retracted state, this sipunculid resembles the shape of a peanut kernel, giving the peanut worms their common name.

== Distribution and habitat ==
Themiste pyroides is found in the northeastern Pacific Ocean, in the waters around Japan, Alaska, the United States and Mexico, and in the western Atlantic Ocean. It conceals itself, living in cracks in the rock, under stones and boulders, in clusters of bivalve molluscs and among the rhizomes of Phyllospadix iwatensis. It occurs from the intertidal zone down to about 36 m (120 ft).

== Ecology ==
The breeding behaviour in this species is unusual in that swarming occurs; adult males and females congregate among the rocks forming dense masses before releasing their gametes into the water. After fertilisation, the embryos develop into trochophore larvae. These drift in the plankton, before settling on the seabed and undergoing metamorphosis into juvenile worms.
