= Nephasoma minutum =

Scientific classification
- Kingdom: Animalia
- Phylum: Annelida
- Class: Sipuncula
- Order: Golfingiida
- Family: Golfingiidae
- Genus: Nephasoma
- Species: N. minutum

Binomial name
- Nephasoma minutum (Keferstein, 1862)

Synonyms
- Golfingia minuta (Keferstein, 1862)

Species of worm

Nephasoma minutum is a marine invertebrate of the phylum Sipuncula, commonly known as peanut worms because of their shape when contracted. It is a cylindrical, unsegmented worm with a crown of tentacles around the mouth. These worms live in crevices in the rocks or in burrows in shallow water in Western Europe, and the eastern United States.

== Description ==
Reaching a maximum length of about 1.5 cm (0.6 in), Nephasoma minutum, like all peanut worms, has a cylindrical trunk and a narrower, retractable anterior section known as the introvert. The mouth is at the end of the introvert which can be extended to feed or retracted into the body at other times. In this species the trunk is in excess of three times as long as its width and the introvert is a similar length to the trunk, which is cylindrical and smooth. There are two tentacles and up to six irregular lobular projections near the mouth and there are a few irregularly-arranged, spine-like hooks near the tip of the introvert, but these may be absent in adults. This peanut worm varies in colour, and may be white, yellowish-grey or orange. This description applies to populations in the northeastern Atlantic that are hermaphrodites; other populations with slightly differing characteristics, and some which are gonochoristic (having separate sexes), are often additionally referred to as Nephasoma minutum, which is likely to be a "taxonomic wastebasket".

== Distribution and habitat ==
The range of N. minutum in the northeastern Atlantic Ocean extends from Sweden to the British Isles and the coast of France. It is also reported from the eastern and western coasts of the United States. Present from the lower intertidal zone down to about 50 m (160 ft), it burrows into sand, gravel and mud or hides in crevices in the rock.

== Ecology ==
A detritivore, N. minutum unselectively collects organic particles with its tentacles and ingests them when the introvert is drawn in. It is a hermaphrodite; most eggs laid by this class are spherical, but N. minutum produces large, elongate eggs with yolks on which the larvae can feed for two months during their direct development.
