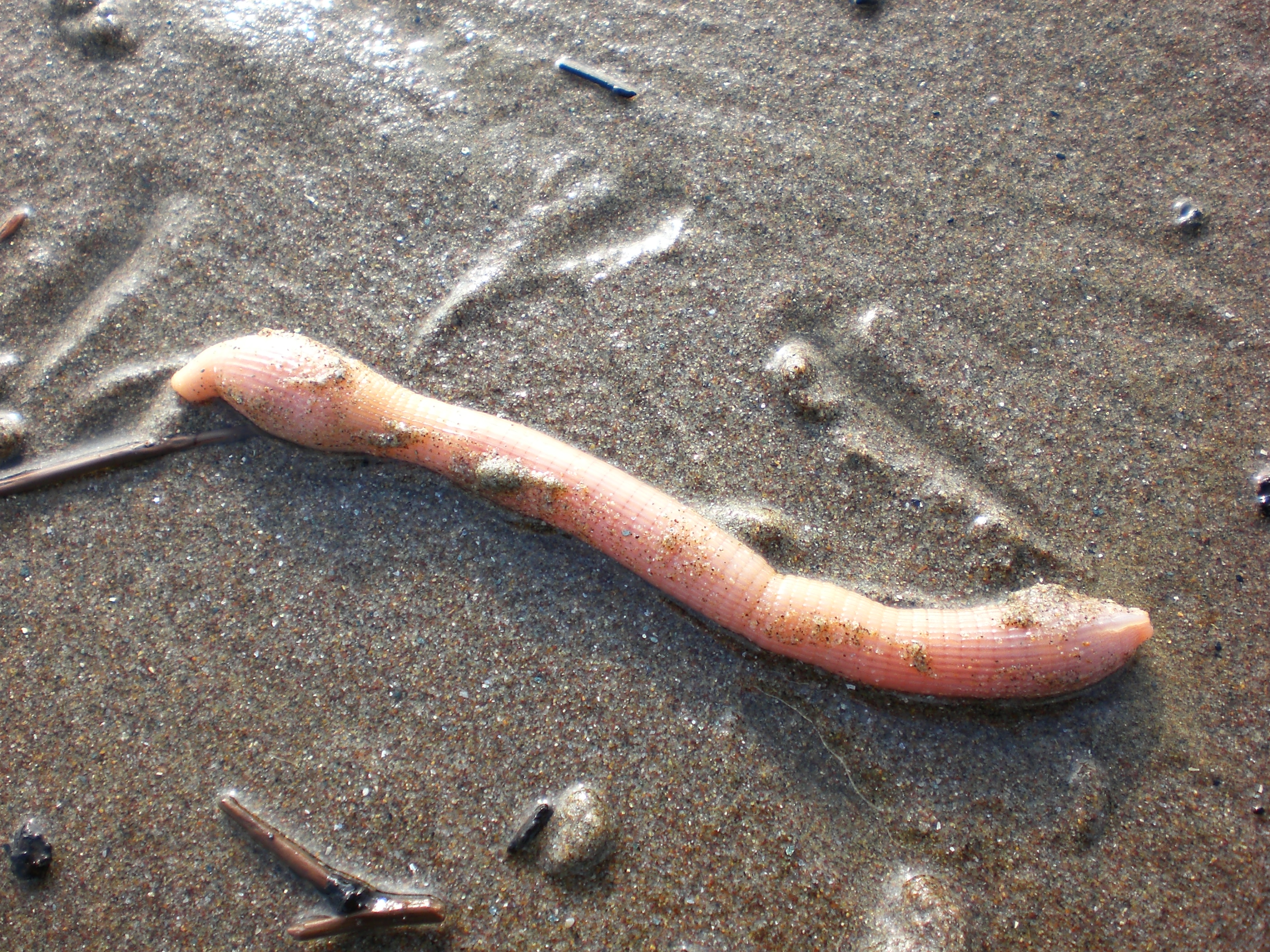

Scientific classification
- Kingdom: Animalia
- Phylum: Annelida
- Class: Sipuncula
- Order: Golfingiida
- Family: Sipunculidae
- Genus: Sipunculus
- Species: S. nudus

Binomial name
- Sipunculus nudus Linnaeus, 1766

= Sipunculus nudus =

Species of worm

Sipunculus nudus is a cosmopolitan species of unsegmented marine worm of the class Sipuncula, also known as peanut worms.

== Description ==
As in all peanut worms, the body of S. nudus consists of a sac-like portion called the trunk and an eversible proboscis called the introvert. The mouth is located at the anterior end of the introvert and is surrounded by a group of tentacles. The body of the adult worm is around 15 centimetres (5.9 in) in length but can reach up to 25 cm (9.8 in) in some cases, of which about 3.5 centimetres (1.4 in) to 6 centimetres (2.4 in) correspond to the introvert.

The epidermis contains a series of longitudinal coelomic canals that are connected to the main coelomic cavity by pores. Below the epidermis there are circular muscles surrounding the body which, as the coelomic canals, are marked on the surface, making the animal's surface be marked by rectangular ridges.

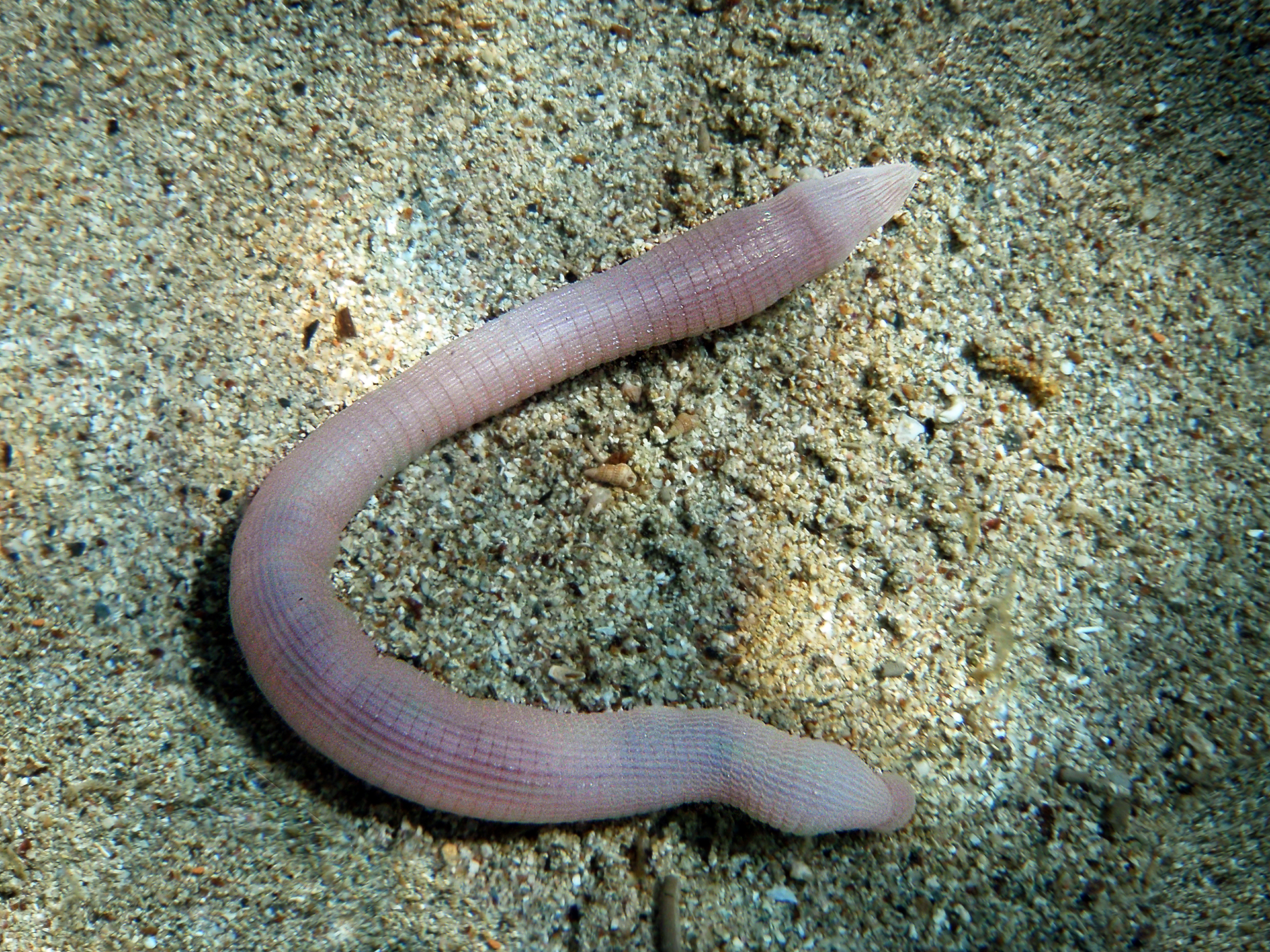
Sipunculus nudus in Pula, Croatia

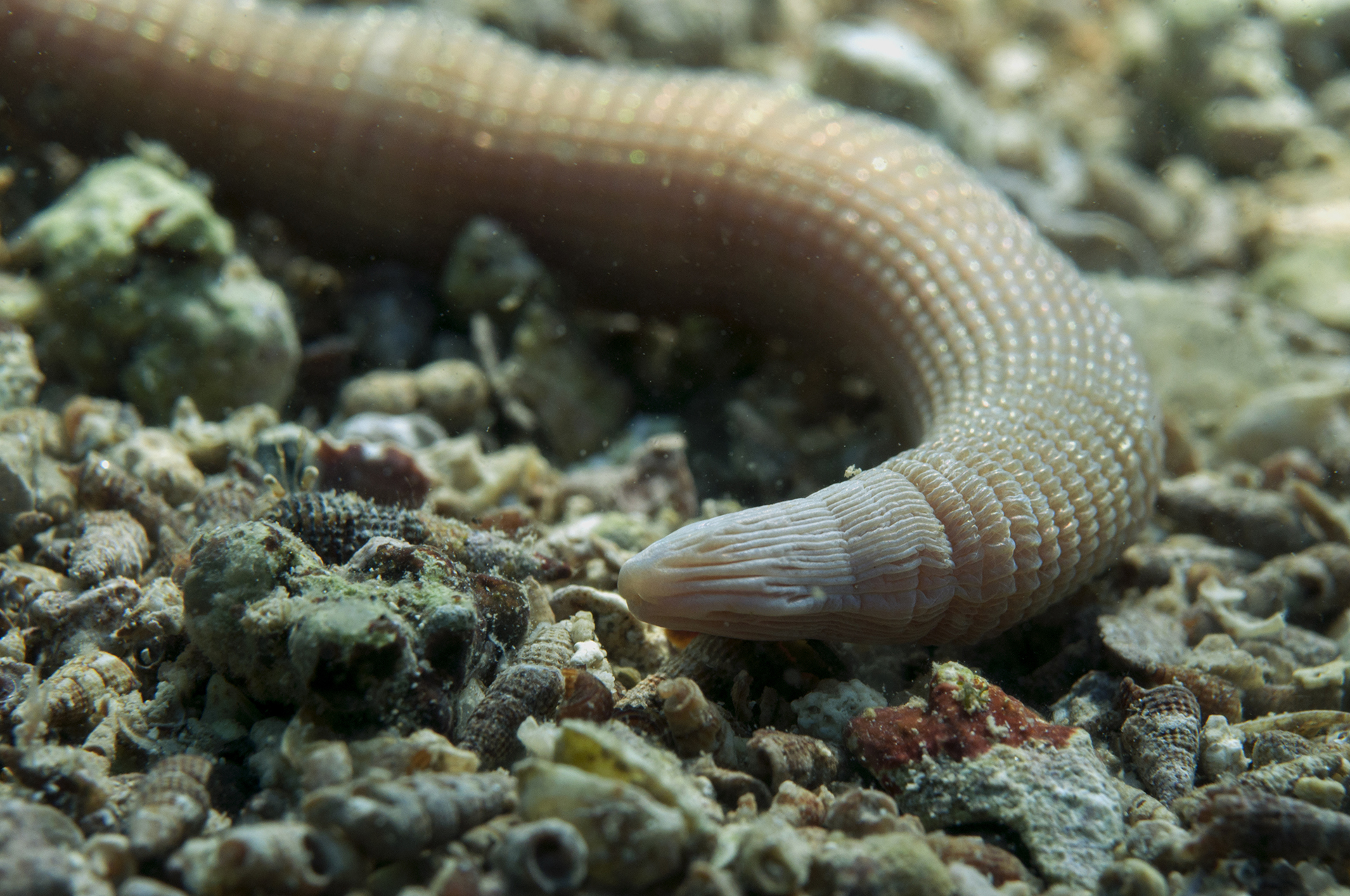
Sipunculus nudus (front end) in Pula, Croatia

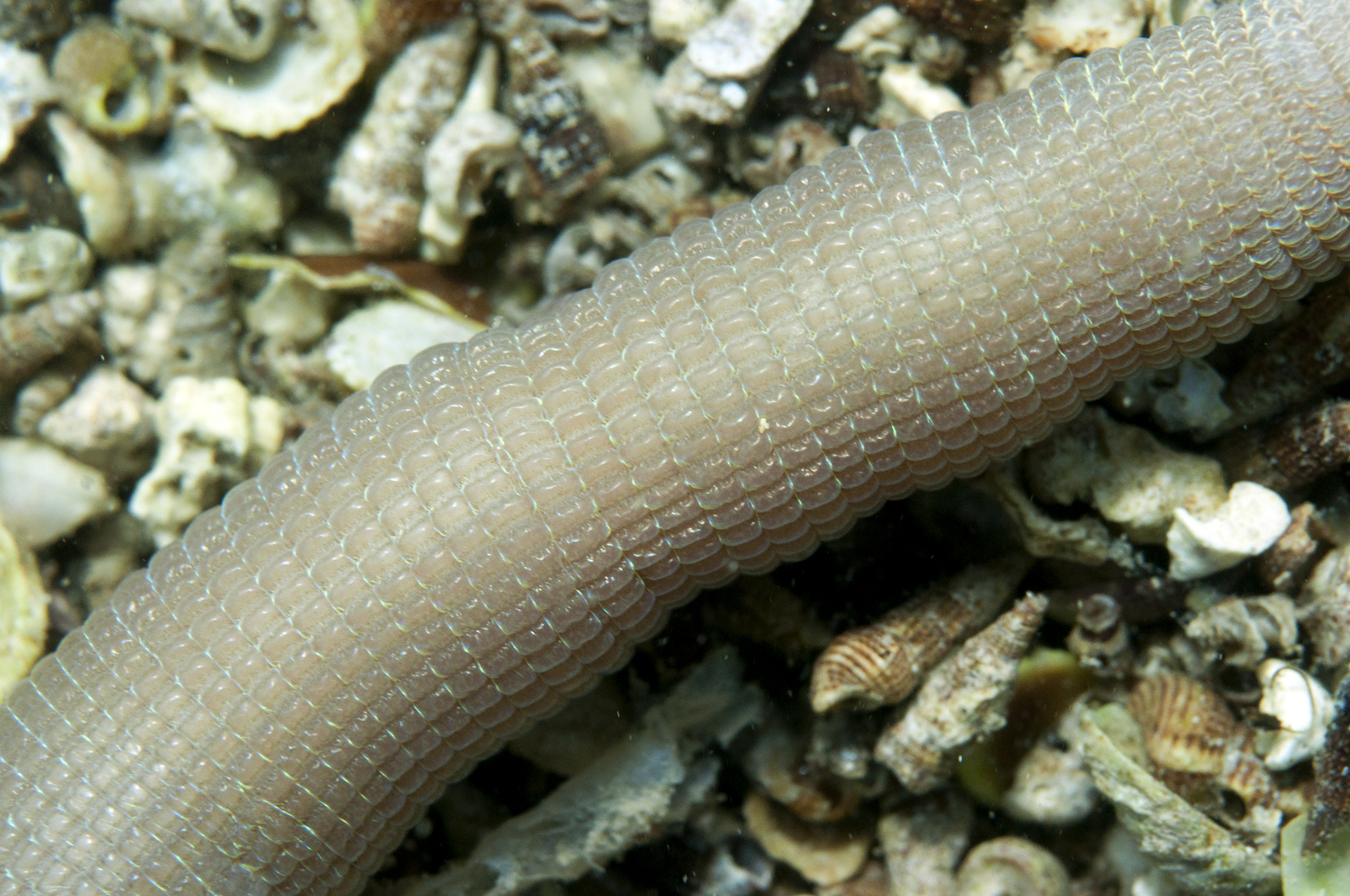
Sipunculus nudus (body texture) in Pula, Croatia

== Distribution ==
Sipunculus nudus is commonly found on subtidal zones of sandy shores to seabeds 900 metres (3,000 ft) deep in temperate or tropical waters worldwide. The worm hides in sand burrows which it makes by itself during the day and may extend its tentacles out of the burrow to feed at night. Its diet consists of plant or animal tissue fragments and any surrounding sand it may ingest with it.

Recent research indicates that it is a complex of similar species around the world rather than one species, with at least "five distinct lineages identified by phylogenetic analyses".

== Uses ==
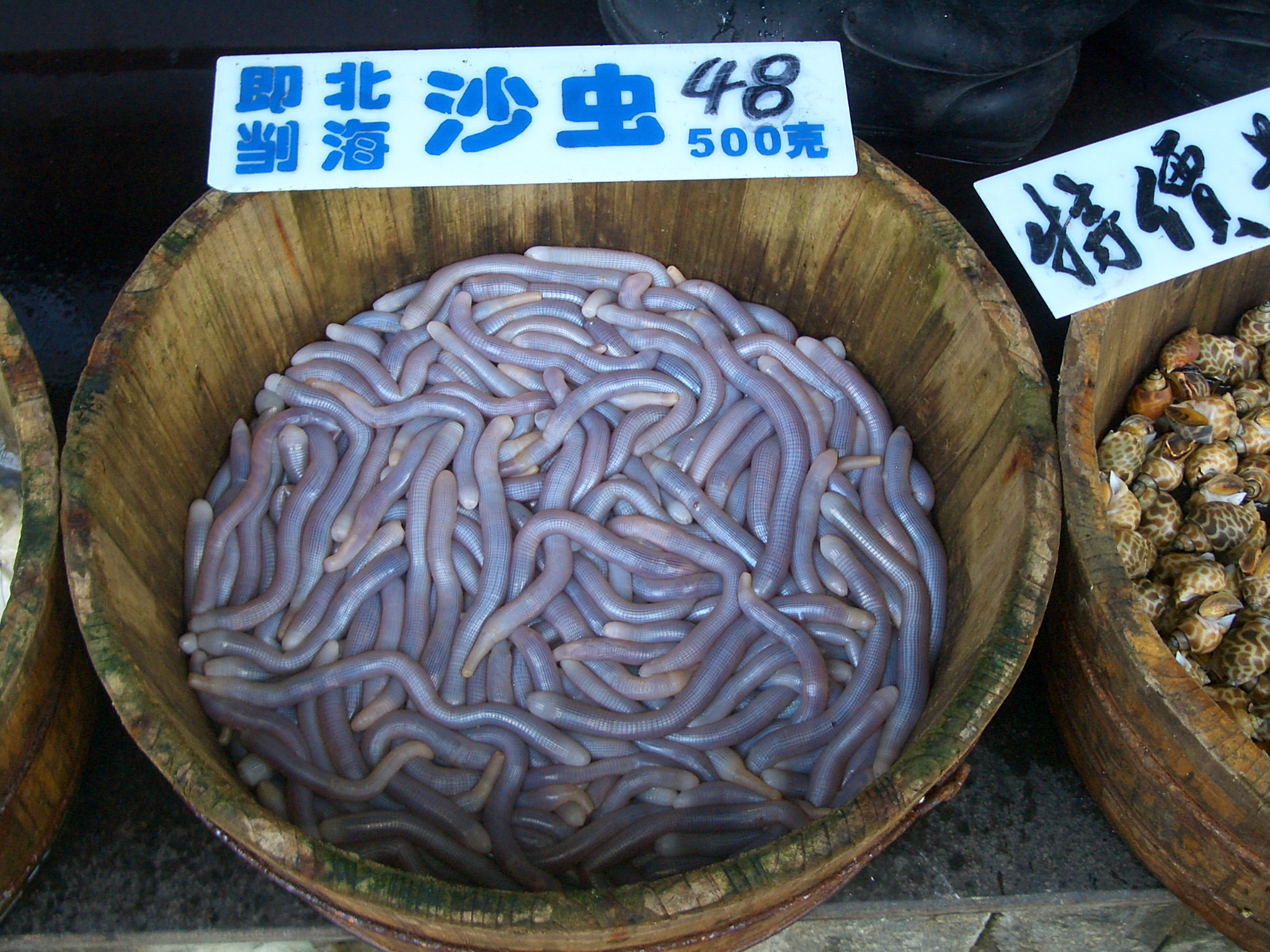
On sale in Guangzhou

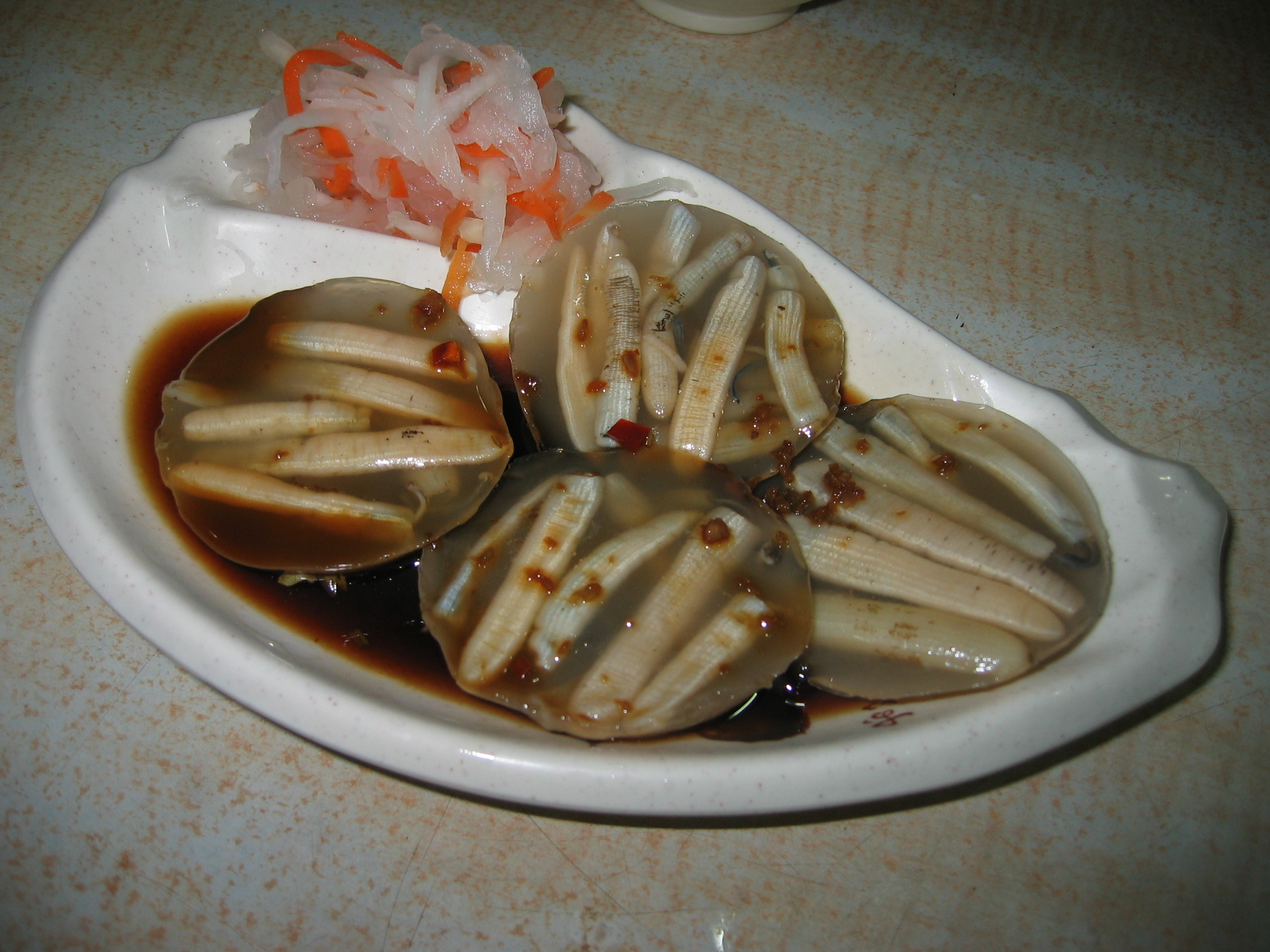
Worm aspic (土笋凍 tǔsǔndòng), a specialty of Xiamen

The species is collected and sold as a model organism for various fields of science, as fish bait, or for human consumption. It is also sold and exported as a dried seafood product.

In particular, S. nudus is collected, cleaned of its innards, and eaten as a delicacy in the South Chinese provinces of Guangdong, Hainan, Guangxi, and Fujian. The worms are local delicacies in Beihai, Guangxi, where Běihǎi shāchóng (北海沙虫, lit. "Beihai sandworm") and sold in dried form to be fried as a snack or braised as an ingredient for a soup stock. In Xiamen, Fujian, the species is called tǔsǔn (土笋, lit. "earth bamboo shoot") and is braised and allow to gel in the liquid and eaten as aspic (t 土笋凍, s 土笋冻, tǔsǔndòng) in local restaurants.

Sipunculus nudus is also collected on islands in the northern Vietnamese province of Quang Ninh where sá sùng (local pronunciation of 沙虫) is used as an ingredient for pho stock.
