= Themiste hennahi =

Scientific classification
- Kingdom: Animalia
- Phylum: Annelida
- Class: Sipuncula
- Order: Golfingiida
- Family: Themistidae
- Genus: Themiste
- Species: T. hennahi

Binomial name
- Themiste hennahi Gray, 1828

Synonyms
- Dendrostoma mytheca Chamberlin, 1919; Dendrostoma perimeces Fisher, 1928; Dendrostoma peruvianum Collin, 1892; Dendrostoma ramosum (Quatrefages, 1865); Dendrostoma zostericolum Chamberlin, 1919; Dendrostomum lissum Fisher, 1952; Dendrostomum peruvianum Collin, 1892; Dendrostomum ramosum Quatrefages, 1865; Dendrostomum schmitti Fisher, 1952; Dendrostomum zostericolum Chamberlin, 1919; Phascolosoma rapa (Quatrefages, 1865); Sipunculus rapus Quatrefages, 1865; Themiste lissa (Fisher, 1952); Themiste perimeces (Fisher, 1928); Themiste ramosa (Quatrefages, 1865); Themiste schmitti (Fisher, 1952); Themiste zostericola (Chamberlin, 1919)

Species of peanut worm

Themiste hennahi is a species of unsegmented benthic marine worm in the phylum Sipuncula, the peanut worms. It is native to shallow waters on the Pacific coast of North and South America. This worm was first described in 1828 by the British zoologist John Edward Gray as Themiste hennahi, the type specimen having been collected by the Rev. W. Hennah, with the type locality being Peru.

== Description ==
The body of this worm is cylindrical. The introvert (the retractable anterior part of the worm) is tipped by a crown-like structure of six branching tentacles which surround the mouth. The collar (immediately behind the tentacles) is not reddish-purple as it is in Themiste dyscrita, and the introvert is devoid of spines.

== Distribution and habitat ==
Themiste hennahi is native to the tropical and subtropical eastern Pacific Ocean, its range including the western coast of the United States, and the coasts of Peru and Chile. It burrows into sandy, gravelly, silty and muddy substrates in the intertidal zone, including eelgrass beds, and conceals itself under loose rocks.

== Ecology ==
This worm often lives in a burrow or other low-oxygen environment, extending its introvert into the water column to feed. The skin of the trunk is thick and unsuitable as a respiratory surface. Research has shown that the tentacular crown is the main respiratory surface, leading to this worm being described as a "tentacle breather". Oxygen diffuses into the fluid inside the tentacular system where it is taken up by the pigment hemerythrin in the blood cells. The oxygen further diffuses through an elaborate septum into the coelomic cavity where it is retained because there is a greater capacity for oxygen in the coelom than in the tentacular cavity. This respiratory system makes the worm resistant to a lack of oxygen as it can call on the oxygen already bound to the hemerythrin when the oxygen in its environment is insufficient.
