= Phascolopsis =

Scientific classification
- Kingdom: Animalia
- Phylum: Annelida
- Class: Sipuncula
- Order: Golfingiida
- Family: Golfingiidae
- Genus: Phascolopsis (Fisher, 1950)
- Species: P. gouldii

Binomial name
- Phascolopsis gouldii (de Pourtalés, 1851)

Synonyms
- Golfingia gouldii; Phascolopsis gouldi; Phascolosoma gouldii; Phascolosomum gouldii; Sipunculus gouldii

Genus of annelid worms

Phascolopsis gouldii is a species of unsegmented benthic marine worm, also known as a peanut worm or star worm. It is the only species in the genus Phascolopsis. It lives in burrows in muddy sand in shallow waters off North America.

== Description ==
Phascolopsis gouldii can reach thirty centimetres long and is a smooth slender cylindrical shape. The body is pinkish and divided into an anterior introvert and a posterior trunk. The introvert is about one quarter of the length of the body and can be retracted inside it by turning outside in. This is done by the contraction of two pairs of large introvert retractor muscles which extend from the body wall of the trunk to near the mouth which is at the tip of the introvert in the centre of the oral disc. This is surrounded by a ring of short tentacles that are used for feeding and in gas exchange. They are pink inside due to the presence of the pigment hemerythrin used in oxygen transport. The anus is on a small mound where the trunk and introvert join. The trunk is covered by a thick integument and is largely composed of bands of longitudinal muscles which can be seen through the cuticle. The anterior part of the trunk, into which the introvert retracts, is broader than the posterior part.

== Distribution ==
This peanut worm is found in shallow coastal waters on the eastern seaboard of the United States from Connecticut to Florida, and Canada. Particular locations where it has been found include Cobscook Bay, the Gulf of Maine, Minister's Island, Indian Point, Newfoundland and the St Lawrence estuary.

== Biology ==
Phascolopsis gouldii burrows in muddy sand. It can pull itself under the surface by pushing its introvert down and then retracting it. It is a deposit and filter feeder, collecting detritus with its tentacles for insertion into its mouth or for consumption after retraction of the introvert. It is able to feed with its introvert while its soft trunk remains in the safety of the burrow. It is dioecious but the sexes are similar. They release eggs and sperm simultaneously into the water and external fertilisation takes place.
