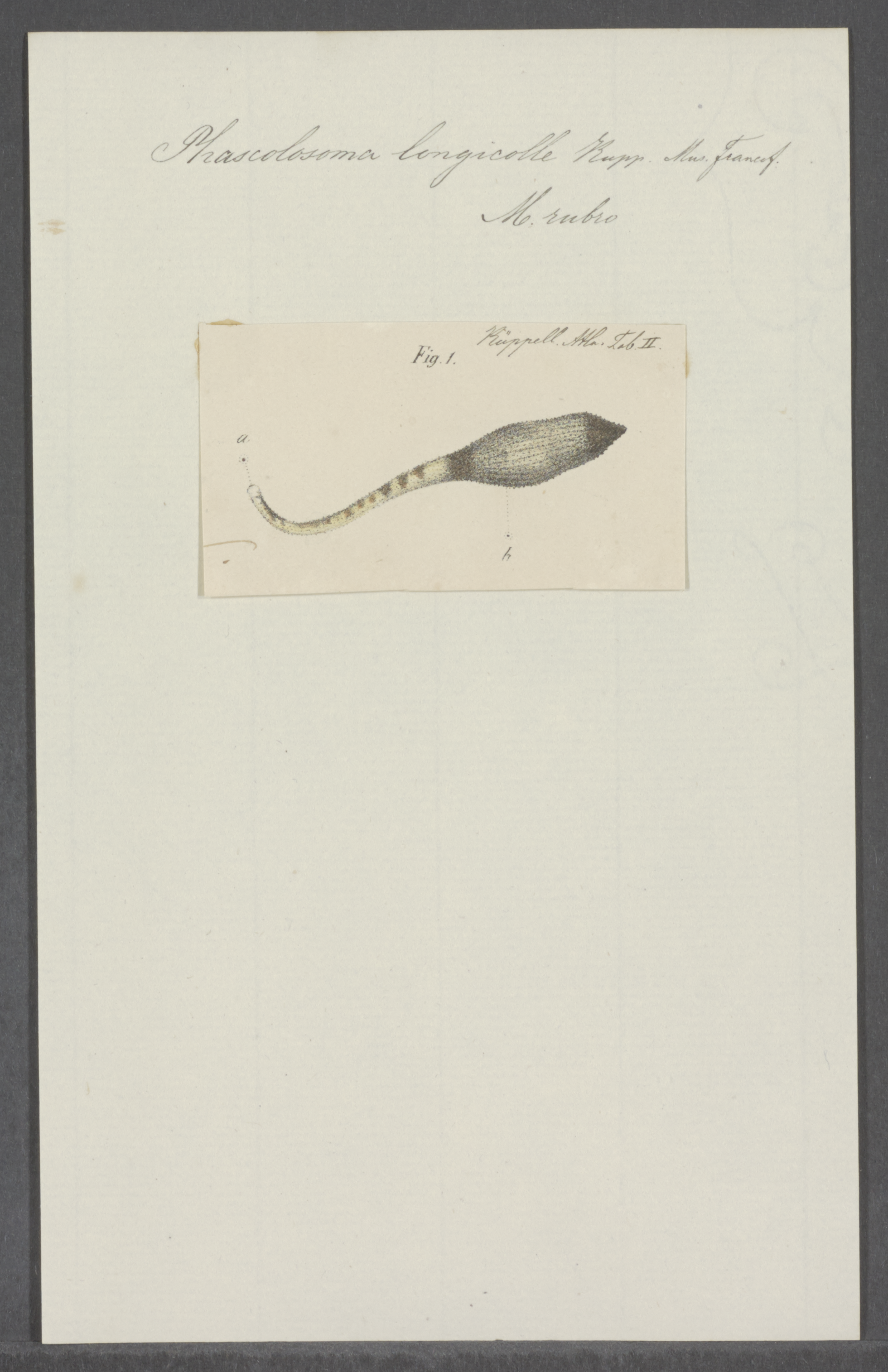
- Golfingia vulgaris

Scientific classification
- Kingdom: Animalia
- Phylum: Annelida
- Class: Sipuncula
- Order: Golfingiida
- Family: Golfingiidae
- Genus: Golfingia
- Species: G. vulgaris

Binomial name
- Golfingia vulgaris (Blainville, 1827)

Synonyms
- Sipunculus vulgaris Phascolosoma vulgare

= Golfingia vulgaris =

Species of peanut worm

Golfingia vulgaris is a marine invertebrate belonging to the phylum Sipuncula, the peanut worms. It is a cylindrical, unsegmented worm with a crown of tentacles around the mouth. It lives in burrows in shallow seas in various parts of the world.

== Description ==
Like other sipunculans, the body is divided into a larger rear end known as the trunk and a narrower front end known as the introvert. The trunk is cylindrical and can reach 200 mm in length but is more commonly 20–50 mm. It varies in colour from grey to white to yellow-brown. The two ends of the trunk are often pigmented dark brown or black. The introvert can be retracted into the trunk by the retractor muscles of which there are usually four but occasionally three. The introvert bears many dark brown, slightly bent hooks. These are arranged irregularly unlike the similar species Golfingia elongata where the hooks are arranged in rings. Young specimens have a crown of around 20 small, finger-like tentacles arranged in a circle around the mouth. As the worm grows the number of tentacles can increase to over 150 and they are arranged in three or more circles. The entoproct Loxosomella phascolosomata often attaches itself to the worm.

== Taxonomy ==
It was first described in 1827 by the French zoologist Henri Marie Ducrotay de Blainville who gave it the name Sipunculus vulgaris. It is now placed in the genus Golfingia which was created by the British zoologist E. Ray Lankester in 1885 and named to celebrate a golfing holiday in St Andrews, Scotland. The species is variable in appearance and has several synonyms. A varying number of subspecies are recognized.

== Distribution and habitat ==
It has a widespread but patchy distribution around the world. It occurs in the eastern Atlantic Ocean from Greenland and Scandinavia south to West Africa and also occurs in the Mediterranean Sea, Adriatic Sea and Red Sea. It is found locally in the western Pacific Ocean and there is a record from the eastern Pacific off British Columbia. The subspecies G. v. herdmani is found in parts of the Indian Ocean and around Australia.

It is found in mud, sand and gravel at depths of 5–2000 m, mainly occurring in waters less than 500 m deep. There is also one record from 5,540 m down in the Kuril–Kamchatka Trench. G. v. herdmani occurs in warm, shallow water.
