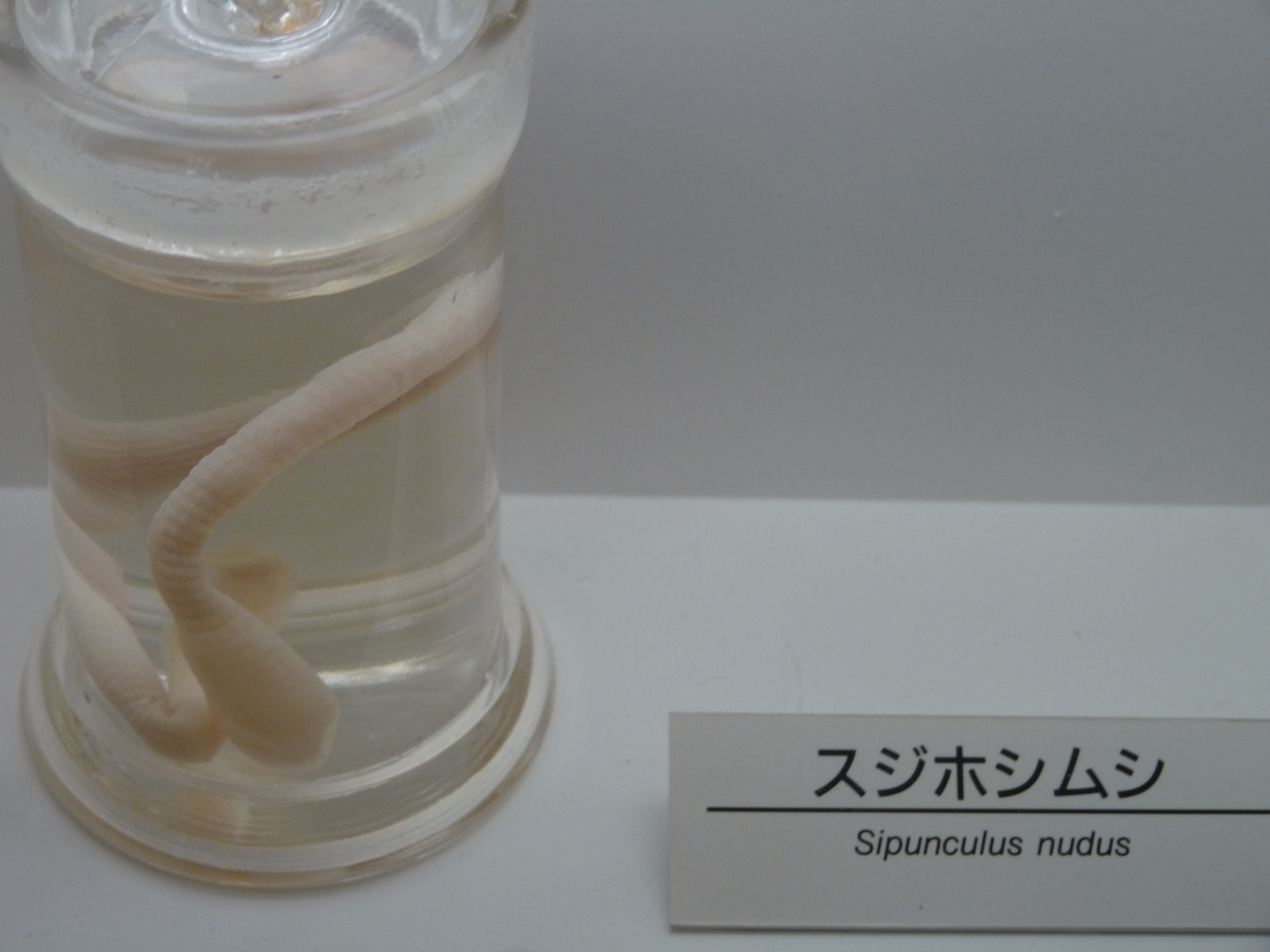
- Sipunculus nudus

Scientific classification
- Kingdom: Animalia
- Phylum: Annelida
- Class: Sipuncula
- Order: Golfingiida
- Family: Sipunculidae
- Genus: Sipunculus; Linnaeus, 1766

Synonyms
- List: Austrosiphon Fisher, 1954; Contraporus Cutler & Cutler, 1985; Liphunculus Chiaje, 1824; Oedematosomum Baird, 1868; Phallosoma Levinsen, 1883; Siphoncolus Scopoli, 1777; Siphonculus Vérany, 1846; Siphunculus Scopoli, 1777; Sipinculus; Siponculus Cuvier, 1817; Siponculus Linnaeus, 1766; Sipunculis Linnaeus, 1766; Sipunculis Quatrefages, 1850; Syphunculus Scopoli, 1777; Syrinx Bohadsch, 1761; Xenopsis Johnson, 1969

= Sipunculus =

Genus of worms

Sipunculus is a genus of worms belonging to the family Sipunculidae.

== Taxonomy ==
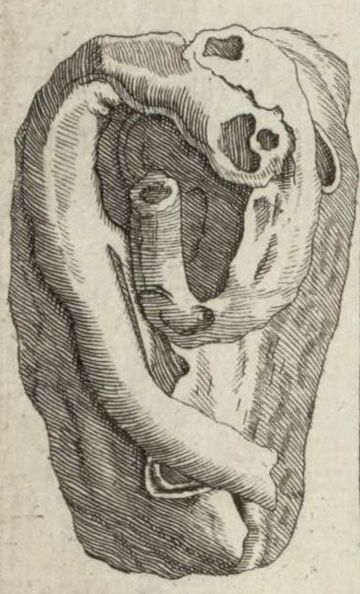
Fossilized Siphunculus scaber in Morton (1712)

Sipunculus is a variant spelling of the Latin siphunculus ("little tube"), a diminutive of sipho from Greek σίφων (síphōn, "tube, pipe").

Siphunculus was used for fossilized worm-shaped organisms like Siphunculus scaber by the Welsh naturalist Edward Lhuyd in 1699. In the next century, the Swedish naturalist Carl Linnaeus used the scientific name Sipunculus nudus for a species of worms in his 1766 Systema Naturae. In 1814, the French zoologist Constantine Samuel Rafinesque used the feminine form Sipuncula to distinguish the family including S. nudus; this was later elevated to the Sipuncula class, the family being renamed Sipunculidae and the species reorganized into different genera.

== Distribution ==
The genus has cosmopolitan distribution.

== Species ==
Species included in Sipunculus are:

- Sipunculus angasoides Chen, 1963
- Sipunculus clavatus de Blainville, 1827
- Sipunculus corallicolus Pourtalès, 1851
- Sipunculus echinorhynchus Chiaje, 1823
- Sipunculus gulfus Hylleberg, 2014
- Sipunculus indicus Peters, 1850
- Sipunculus lomonossovi Murina, 1968
- Sipunculus longipapillosus Murina, 1968
- Sipunculus macrorhynchus de Blainville, 1827
- Sipunculus marcusi Ditadi, 1976
- Sipunculus microrhynchus de Blainville, 1827
- Sipunculus mundanus Selenka & Bülow, 1883
- Sipunculus norvegicus Danielssen, 1869
- Sipunculus nudus Linnaeus, 1766
- Sipunculus phalloides (Pallas, 1774)
- Sipunculus polymyotus Fisher, 1947
- Sipunculus robustus Keferstein, 1865
- Sipunculus rubens Costa, 1860
- Sipunculus rufofimbriatus Blanchard, 1849
- Sipunculus saccatus Linnaeus, 1767
- Sipunculus thailandicus Hylleberg, 2014
- Sipunculus zenkevitchi Murina, 1969
