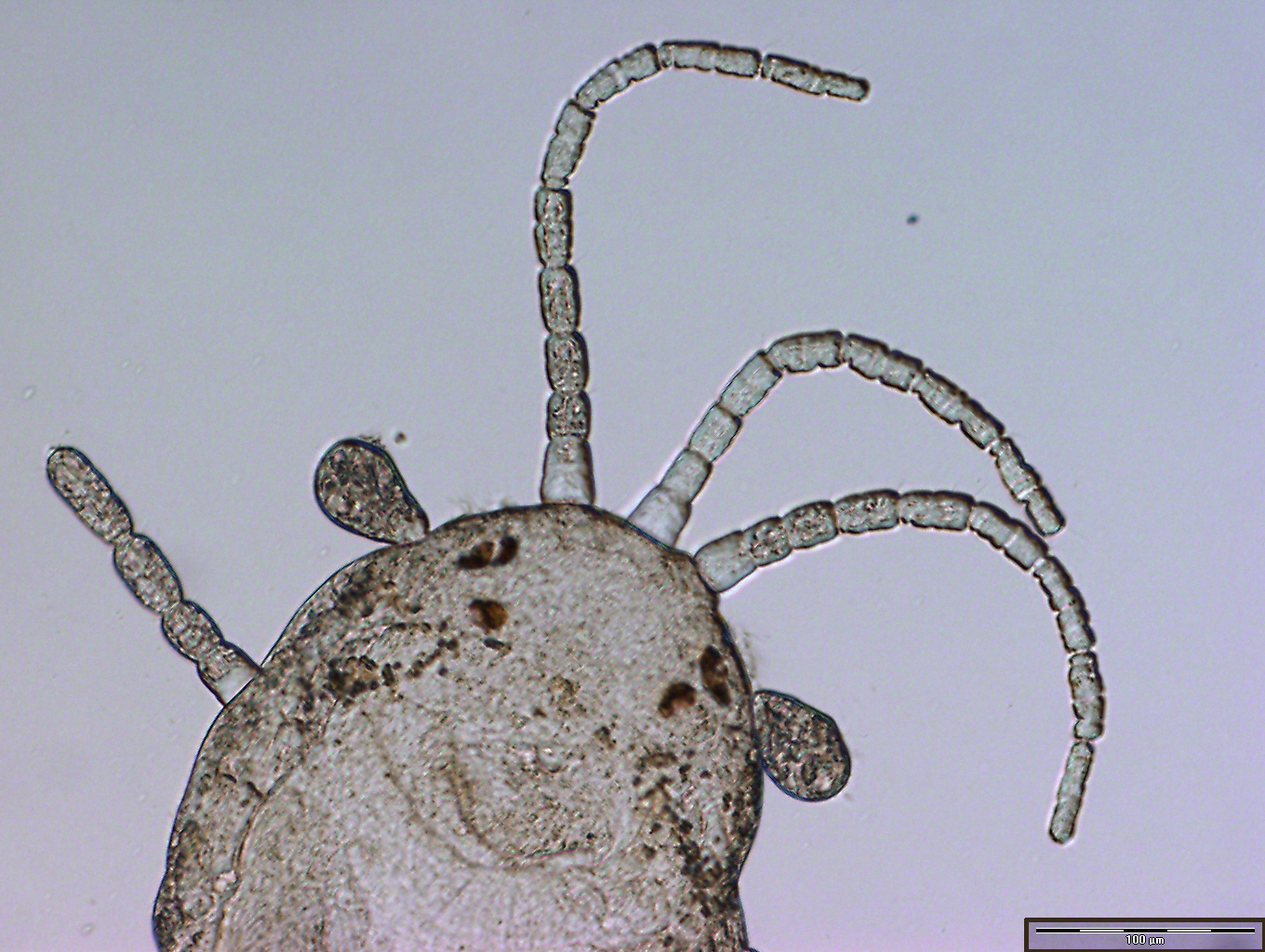

Scientific classification
- Domain: Eukaryota
- Kingdom: Animalia
- Phylum: Annelida
- Class: Polychaeta
- Order: Haplodrili
- Family: Nerillidae
- Genus: Nerilla
- Species: N. antennata

Binomial name
- Nerilla antennata Eduard Oscar Schmidt, 1848

= Nerilla antennata =

Species of annelid

Nerilla antennata is 1–2 mm colourless meiofaunal polychaete. It is often found in aquaculture.

== Morphology ==
Nerilla antennata has nine segments with chaetae and a prostomium with two very large clavate palpates and three segmented tentacles. On the prostomium it has four eyes and two ciliated nuchal organs on the side. The other segments have both dorsally – and ventrally parapods with simple chaetae. The peristomium has two segmented anal cirri.

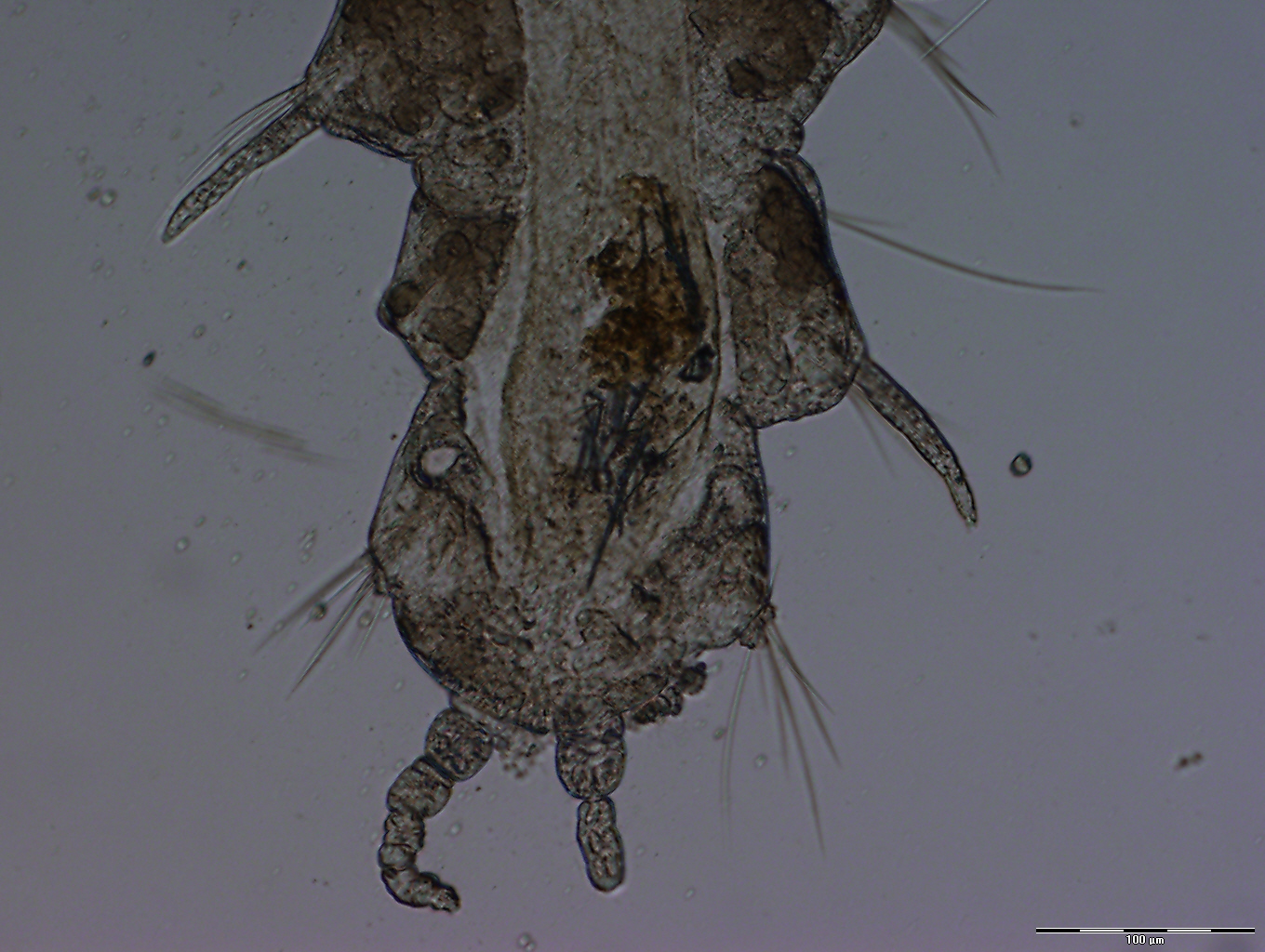

Male specimens can be identified by three pairs of gonoducts at segment 6 - 8. Females have ovaries at segment 6 and oviducts at segment 7.

== Ecology ==
The marine species. Nerilla antennata lives interstitially (between grains of sand) and between algae. It is widely distributed with findings in European waters and around New Zealand. WoRMS The larval development has no pelagic stadium.

== Systematics ==
Generally the family Nerillidae has few segments, two palpates and up to three tentacles. The family includes the 15 marine genera. WoRMS
