= Phascolionidae =

Scientific classification
- Kingdom: Animalia
- Phylum: Annelida
- Class: Sipuncula
- Order: Golfingiida
- Family: Phascolionidae; Cutler & Gibbs, 1985

Genera
- Onchnesoma; Phascolion

Family of annelid worms

Phascolionidae is a family of peanut worms.

== Species ==
=== Onchnesoma ===
- Onchnesoma intermedium Murina 1976
- Onchnesoma magnibathum Cutler 1969
- Onchnesoma squamatum (Koren and Danielssen, 1875)
- Onchnesoma steenstrupii Koren & Danielssen 1875

=== Phascolion ===
- Phascolion abnorme Fischer 1895
- Phascolion bogorovi Murina 1973
- Phascolion caupo Hendrix 1975
- Phascolion cirratum Murina, 1968
- Phascolion collare Selenka and de Man, 1883
- Phascolion convestitum Sluiter, 1902
- Phascolion cryptum Hendrix, 1975
- Phascolion gerardi Rice, 1993
- Phascolion hedraeum Selenka and de Man, 1883
- Phascolion hibridum Murina 1981
- Phascolion hupferi Fischer, 1895
- Phascolion lucifugax Selenka and de Man, 1883
- Phascolion lutense Selenka, 1885
- Phascolion medusae Cutler and Cuttler, 1980
- Phascolion megaethi Cutler & Cutler 1979
- Phascolion microspheroidis Cutler and Duffy, 1972
- Phascolion pacificum Murina, 1957
- Phascolion pharetratum Sluiter 1902
- Phascolion psammophilus Rice 1993
- Phascolion rectum Ikeda, 1904
- Phascolion robertsoni Stephen & Robertson 1952
- Phascolion strombus (Montagu, 1804)
- Phascolion tuberculosum Théel, 1875
- Phascolion ushakovi Murina 1974
- Phascolion valdiviae Fischer, 1916
