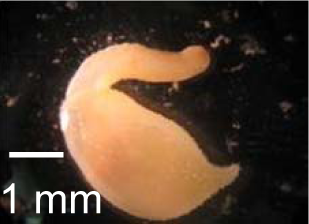

Scientific classification
- Kingdom: Animalia
- Phylum: Annelida
- Class: Sipuncula
- Order: Phascolosomatida
- Family: Phascolosomatidae

Genera
- Antillesoma; Apionsoma; Phascolosoma

= Phascolosomatidae =

Family of worms

Phascolosomatidae is a family of peanut worms. It is the only family in the order Phascolosomatida, which is in the only order in the subclass Phascolosomatidea.

== Genera ==
=== Antillesoma ===
- Antillesoma antillarum (Grübe & Oersted, 1858)

=== Apionsoma ===
- Apionsoma capitata (Gerould, 1913)
- Apionsoma misakianum (Ikeda, 1904)
- Apionsoma murinae (Cutler, 1969)
- Apionsoma pectinatum (Keferstein, 1867)
- Apionsoma trichocephala Sluiter, 1902

=== Phascolosoma ===
- Phascolosoma agassizii (Keferstein, 1866)
- Phascolosoma albolineatum (Baird, 1868)
- Phascolosoma annulatum (Hutton, 1879)
- Phascolosoma arcuatum (Gray, 1828)
- Phascolosoma glabrum (Sluiter, 1902)
- Phascolosoma granulatum (Leuckart, 1828)
- Phascolosoma lobostomum (Fischer, 1895)
- Phascolosoma maculatum (Sluiter, 1886)
- Phascolosoma meteori (Hérubel, 1904)
- Phascolosoma nigrescens (Keferstein, 1865)
- Phascolosoma noduliferum (Stimpson, 1855)
- Phascolosoma pacificum (Keferstein, 1866)
- Phascolosoma perlucens (Baird, 1868)
- Phascolosoma saprophagicum (Gibbs, 1987)
- Phascolosoma scolops (Selenka and de Man, 1883)
- Phascolosoma stephensoni (Stephen, 1942)
- Phascolosoma turnerae (Rice, 1985)
