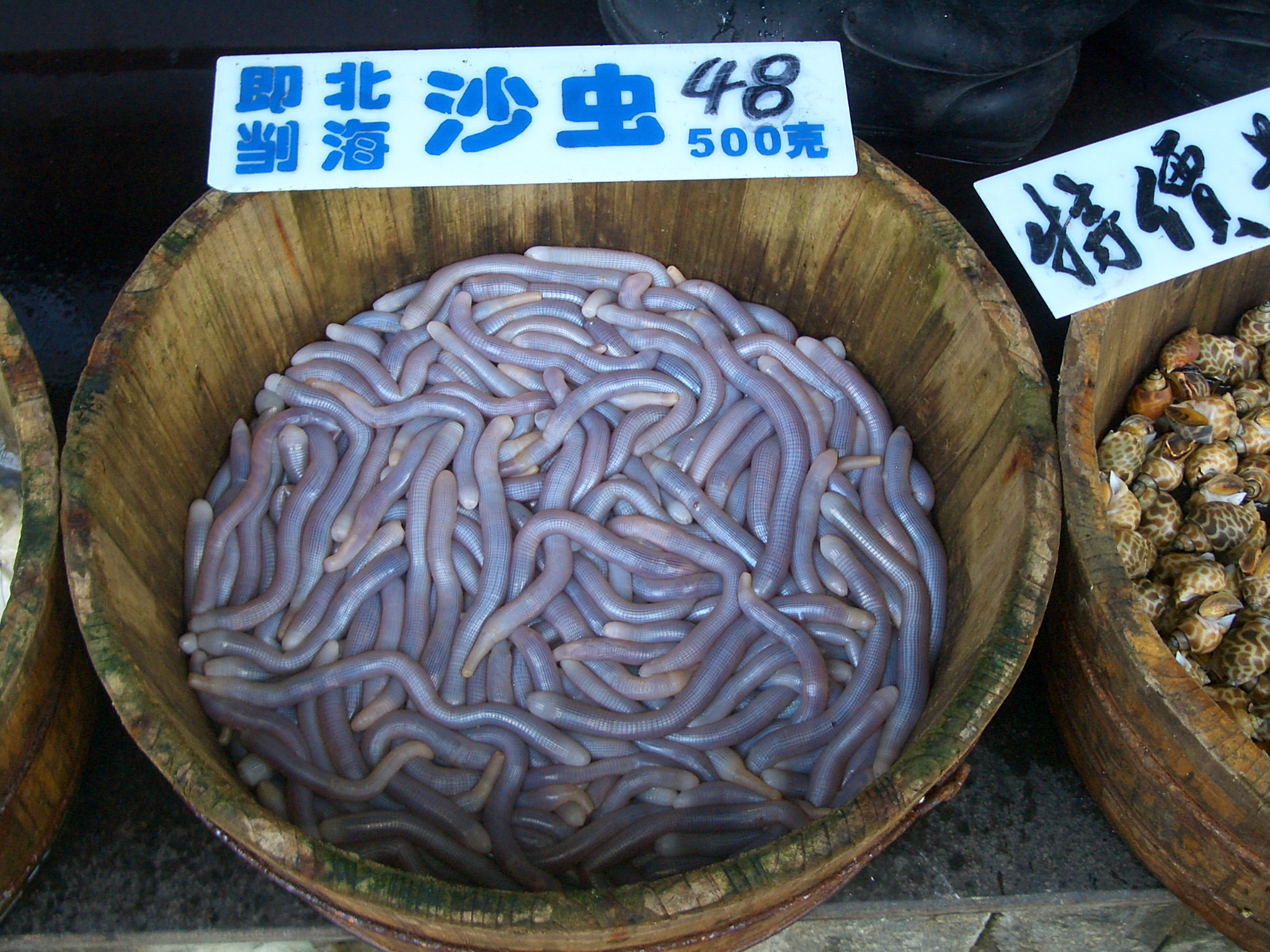
- Sipunculus nudus

Scientific classification
- Kingdom: Animalia
- Phylum: Annelida
- Class: Sipuncula
- Order: Golfingiida
- Family: Sipunculidae; Rafinesque, 1814

Genera
- Sipunculus; Xenosiphon

= Sipunculidae =

Family of peanut worms

Sipunculidae is a family of peanut worms.

== Species ==
=== Sipunculus ===
- Sipunculus indicus Peters, 1850
- Sipunculus lomonossovi Murina 1968
- Sipunculus longipapillosus Murina 1968
- Sipunculus marcusi Ditadi 1976
- Sipunculus mundanus Selenka and Bulow, 1883
- Sipunculus norvegicus Danielssen, 1869
- Sipunculus nudus Linnaeus, 1766
- Sipunculus phalloides (Pallas, 1774)
- Sipunculus polymyotus Fisher 1947
- Sipunculus robustus Keferstein 1865

=== Xenosiphon ===
- Xenosiphon absconditus Saiz 1984
- Xenosiphon branchiatus (Fischer, 1895)
