= Nerilla =

Scientific classification
- Domain: Eukaryota
- Kingdom: Animalia
- Phylum: Annelida
- Class: Polychaeta
- Order: Haplodrili
- Family: Nerillidae
- Genus: Nerilla; Schmidt, 1848

Genus of annelid worms

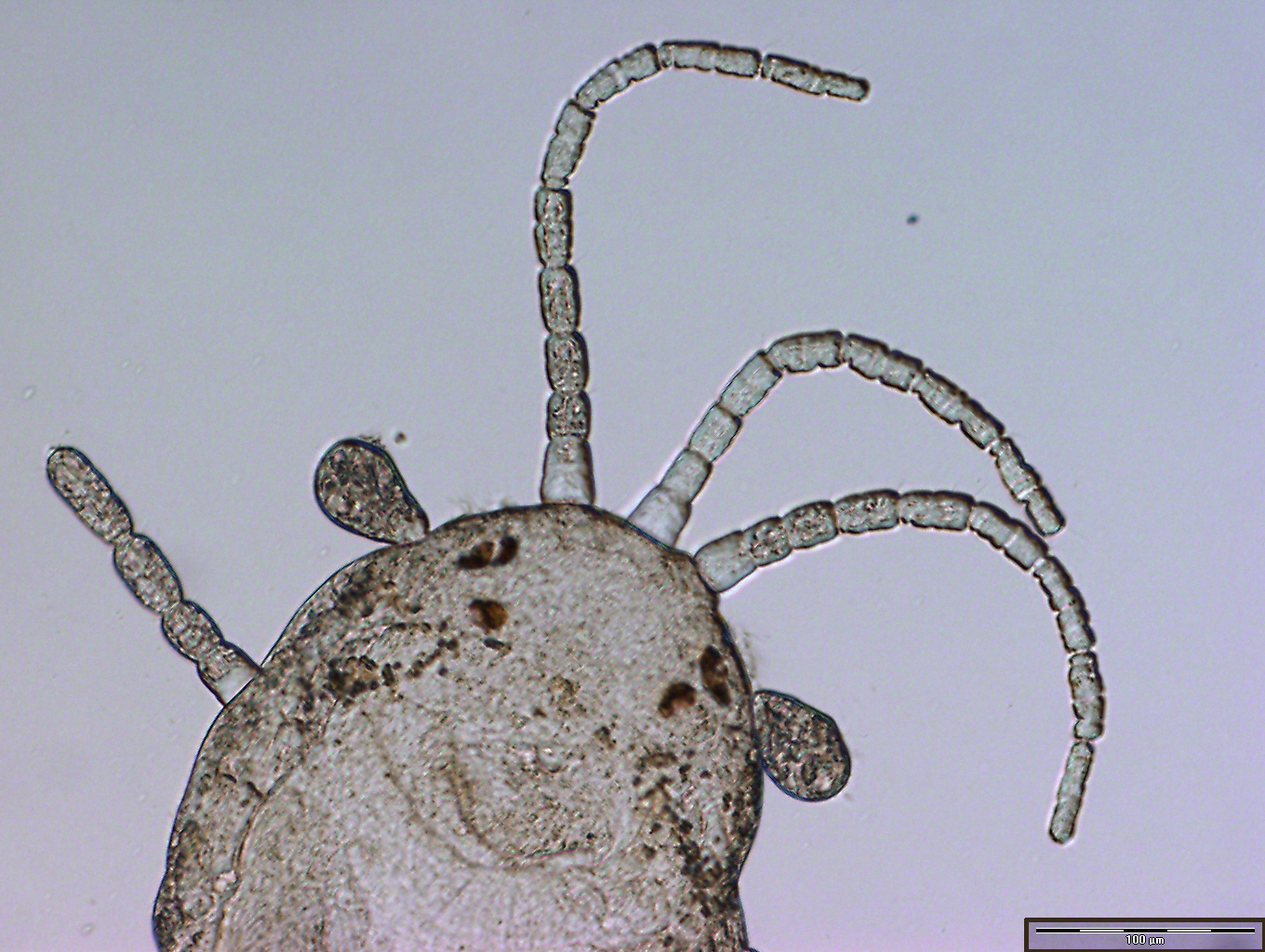
Nerilla antennata, prostomium

Nerilla is a genus of annelids belonging to the family Nerillidae.

The species of this genus are found in Europe, Northern America, Pacific Ocean.

Species:

- Nerilla antennata Schmidt, 1848
- Nerilla australis Willis, 1951
- Nerilla digitata Wieser, 1957
- Nerilla inopinata Gray, 1968
- Nerilla jouini Safonov & Tzetlin, 1988
- Nerilla marginalis Tilzer, 1970
- Nerilla mediterranea Schlieper, 1925
- Nerilla parva Schmidt & Westheide, 1977
- Nerilla rotifera (Quatrefages, 1866)
- Nerilla stygicola Ax, 1957
- Nerilla taurica Skulari, 1997
