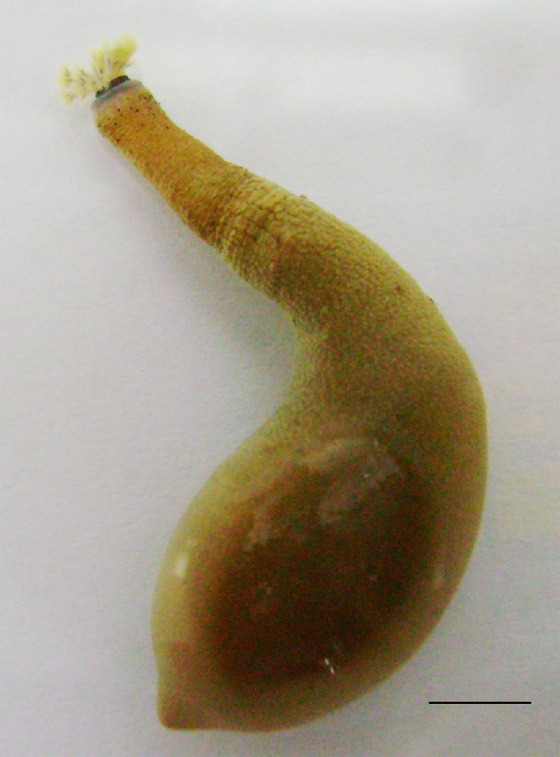
- Themiste alutacea

Scientific classification
- Kingdom: Animalia
- Phylum: Annelida
- Class: Sipuncula
- Order: Golfingiida
- Family: Themistidae; Cutler & Gibbs, 1985
- Genus: Themiste; Gray, 1828

Species
- Ten; see text

= Themiste (worm) =

Genus of worms

Themiste is a genus of peanut worms. It is the only genus in the family Themistidae.

Members of this family are filter feeders, and have their feeding tentacles arranged in an elaborate crown-like structure. This is in contrast to other sipunculans which are deposit feeders.

== Species ==
The genus contains the following species:

- Themiste alutacea (Grube & Ørsted, 1858)
- Themiste blanda (Selenka and de Man, 1883)
- Themiste cymodoceae (Edmonds, 1956)
- Themiste dehamata (Kesteven, 1903)
- Themiste dyscrita (Fisher, 1952)
- Themiste hennahi (Gray, 1828)
- Themiste lageniformis (Baird, 1868)
- Themiste minor (Ikeda, 1904)
- Themiste pyroides (Chamberlain, 1920)
- Themiste variospinosa (Edmonds, 1980)
