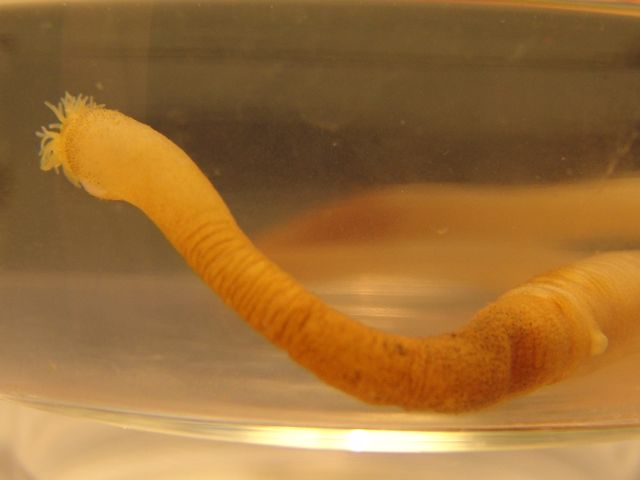
- Golfingia sp. found on Great Cumbrae, Scotland

Scientific classification
- Kingdom: Animalia
- Phylum: Annelida
- Class: Sipuncula
- Order: Golfingiida
- Family: Golfingiidae; Stephen & Edmonds, 1972

Genera
- Golfingia; Nephasoma; Phascolopsis; Thysanocardia

= Golfingiidae =

Family of annelid worms

Golfingiidae is a family of peanut worms.

== Species ==
=== Golfingia ===
- Golfingia anderssoni (Théel, 1911)
- Golfingia birsteini Murina 1973
- Golfingia capensis (Teuscher, 1874)
- Golfingia elongata (Keferstein, 1862)
- Golfingia iniqua (Sluiter, 1912)
- Golfingia margaritacea (Sars, 1851)
- Golfingia mirabilis Murina 1969
- Golfingia muricaudata (Southern, 1913)
- Golfingia pectinatoides Cutler and Cutler, 1979
- Golfingia vulgaris (de Blainville, 1827)

=== Nephasoma ===
- Nephasoma abyssorum (Koren and Danielssen, 1875)
- Nephasoma bulbosum (Southern, 1913)
- Nephasoma capilleforme (Murina, 1973)
- Nephasoma confusum (Sluiter, 1902)
- Nephasoma constricticervix (Cutler, 1969)
- Nephasoma constrictum (Southern, 1913)
- Nephasoma cutleri (Murina, 1975)
- Nephasoma diaphanes (Gerould, 1913)
- Nephasoma eremita (Sars, 1851)
- Nephasoma filiforme (Sluiter, 1902)
- Nephasoma flagriferum (Selenka, 1885)
- Nephasoma laetmophilum (Fisher, 1952)
- Nephasoma lilljeborgi (Danielssen & Koren, 1880)
- Nephasoma minutum (Keferstein, 1862)
- Nephasoma multiaraneusa (Murina, 1967)
- Nephasoma novaezealandiae (Bendham, 1904)
- Nephasoma pellucidum (Keferstein, 1865)
- Nephasoma rimicola (Gibbs, 1973)
- Nephasoma rutilofuscum (Fisher, 1947)
- Nephasoma schuettei (Augener, 1903)
- Nephasoma tasmaniense (Murina, 1964)
- Nephasoma vitjazi (Murina, 1964)
- Nephasoma wodjanizkii (Murina, 1973)

=== Phascolopsis ===
- Phascolopsis gouldii (De Pourtalés, 1851)

=== Thysanocardia ===
- Thysanocardia catharinae (Grübe, 1868)
- Thysanocardia nigra (Ikeda, 1904)
- Thysanocardia procera (Möbius, 1875)
