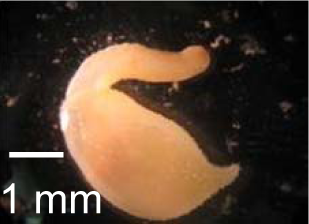
- Phascolosoma turnerae

Scientific classification
- Kingdom: Animalia
- Phylum: Annelida
- Class: Sipuncula
- Subclass: Phascolosomatidea

Orders
- Aspidosiphonida; Phascolosomatida

= Phascolosomatidea =

Class of worms

Phascolosomatidea is a subclass of the class Sipuncula, the peanut worms, containing two orders:-

- Aspidosiphonida containing the single family Aspidosiphonidae
- Phascolosomatida containing the single family Phascolosomatidae

Their hooks are arranged in regular rings.
