= Nuchal organ =

Organ in the head of various animals

The nuchal organ, indicated by "no". Source:

The nuchal organ is a ciliated pit or groove present at the posterior end of the prostomium of annelid worms, some cephalopods, and other invertebrates.

Annelids only possess one nuchal organ, although the nature of the grooving may make it appear to be a pair of organs.

It may be involved in light detection, and may have a role in food detection and mating.
