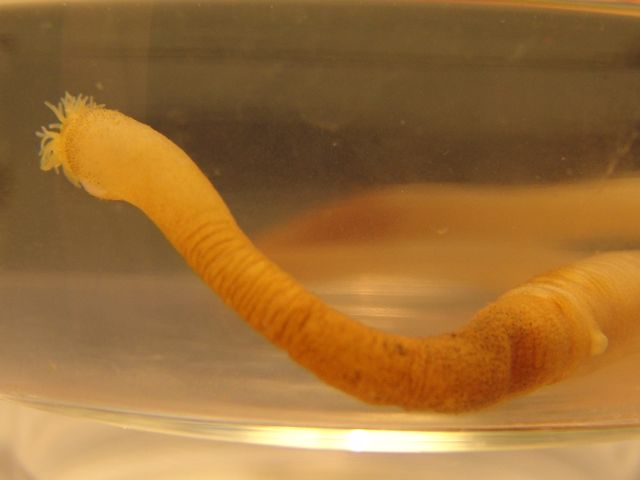

Scientific classification
- Kingdom: Animalia
- Phylum: Annelida
- Class: Sipuncula
- Subclass: Sipunculidea; E. Cutler and Gibbs, 1985
- Order: Golfingiida; E. Cutler and Gibbs, 1985

Families
- Golfingiidae; Phascolionidae; Sipunculidae; Themistidae

= Golfingiida =

Order of peanut worms

Golfingiida, also known as the Golfingiiformes, is an order of peanut worms. The tentacles form a circle around the mouth, while those of the sister taxon, Phascolosomatidea, are only found above the mouth. Most species burrow in the substrate but some live in the empty shells of gastropods. It is an order of the class Sipuncula (previously considered a phylum), and contains the following families:

- Golfingiidae
- Phascolionidae
- Sipunculidae Rafinesque, 1814
- Themistidae
