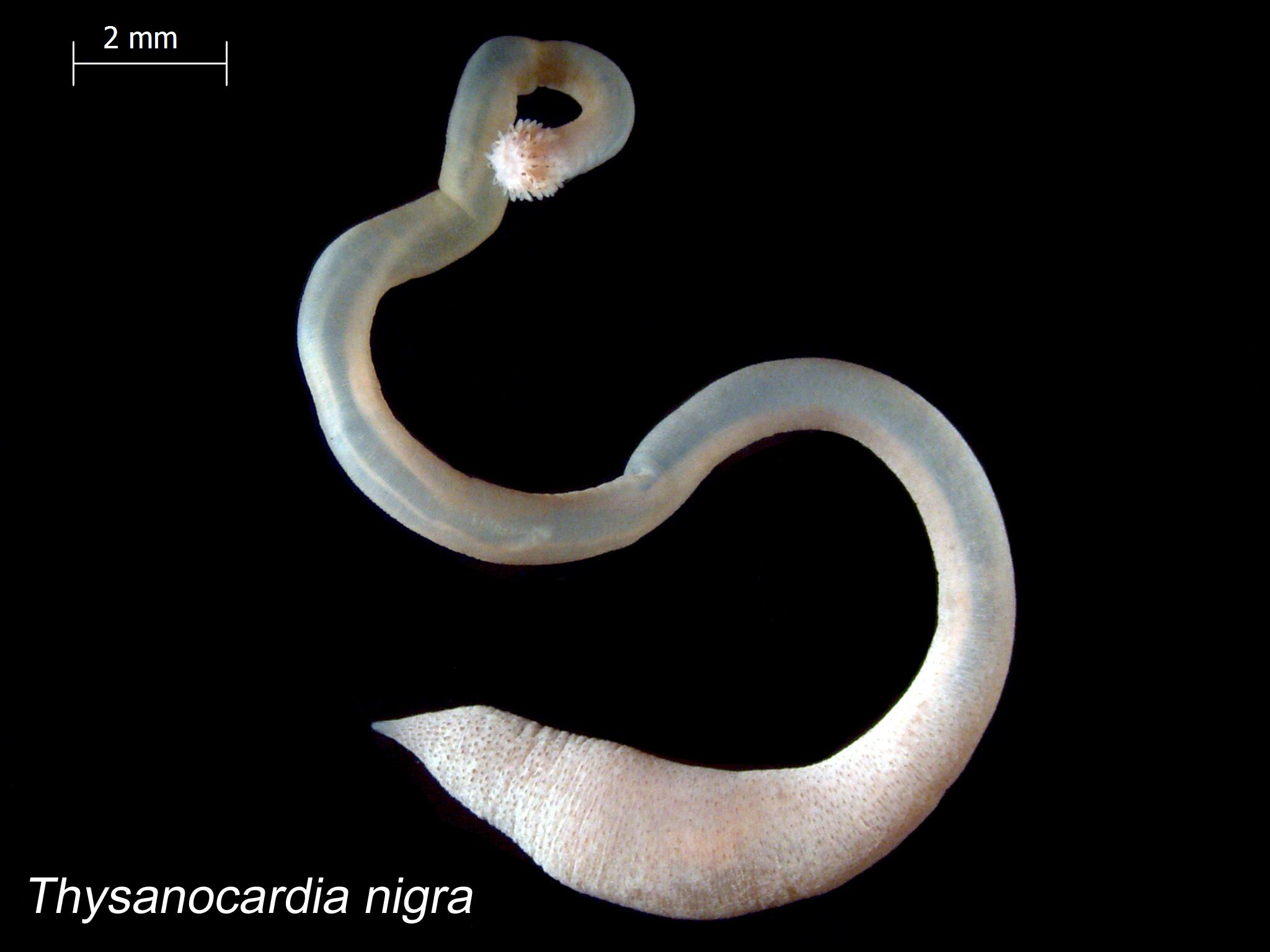
- Thysanocardia nigra

Scientific classification
- Kingdom: Animalia
- Phylum: Annelida
- Class: Sipuncula; Rafinesque, 1814

Subclasses, orders and families
- Subclass Phascolosomatidea; Order Aspidosiphonida; Family Aspidosiphonidae; Order Phascolosomatida; Family Phascolosomatidae; Subclass Sipunculidea; Order Golfingiida; Family Golfingiidae; Family Phascolionidae; Family Sipunculidae; Family Themistidae

= Sipuncula =

Sipuncula Temporal range: Cambrian–Recent

Class of unsegmented annelids

The Sipuncula or Sipunculida (common names sipunculid worms or peanut worms) is a class containing about 162 species of marine annelid worms, that have secondarily lost their segmentation. Sipuncula was once considered a phylum of unsegmented worms, but was demoted to a class of Annelida, based on recent molecular work.

Sipunculans vary in size but most species are under 10 cm (4 in) in length. The body is divided into an unsegmented, bulbous trunk and a narrower, anterior section, called the "introvert", which can be retracted into the trunk. The mouth is at the tip of the introvert and is surrounded in most groups by a ring of short tentacles. With no hard parts, the body is flexible and mobile. Although found in a range of habitats throughout the world's oceans, the majority of species live in shallow water habitats, burrowing under the surface of sandy and muddy substrates. Others live under stones, in rock crevices or in other concealed locations.

Most sipunculans are deposit feeders, extending the introvert to gather food particles and draw them into the mouth, and retracting the introvert when feeding conditions are unsuitable or danger threatens. With a few exceptions, reproduction is sexual and involves a planktonic larval stage. Sipunculid worms are used as food in some countries in south-east Asia.

== Taxonomy ==
Sipuncula is a feminine variant of the now-obsolete genus name Sipunculus, itself a variant of the Latin siphunculus ("little tube"), a diminutive of sipho from Greek σίφων (síphōn, "tube, pipe").

The Swedish naturalist Carl Linnaeus first described the worm Sipunculus nudus in his Systema Naturae in 1767. In 1814, the French zoologist Constantine Samuel Rafinesque used the word "Sipuncula" to describe the family (now Sipunculidae), and in time, the term came to be used for the whole class. This is a relatively understudied group, and it is estimated there may be around 162 species worldwide.

The phylogenetic placement of this group in the past has proved troublesome. Originally classified as annelids, despite the complete lack of segmentation, bristles and other annelid characters, the phylum Sipuncula was later allied with the Mollusca, mostly on the basis of developmental and larval characters. These phyla have been included in a larger group, the Lophotrochozoa, that also includes the annelids, the ribbon worms and several other phyla. Phylogenetic analyses based on 79 ribosomal proteins indicated a position of Sipuncula within Annelida. Subsequent analysis of the mitochondrion's DNA has confirmed their close relationship to the Annelida (including echiurans and pogonophorans). It has also been shown that a rudimentary neural segmentation similar to that of annelids occurs in the early larval stage, even if these traits are absent in the adults.

== Anatomy ==
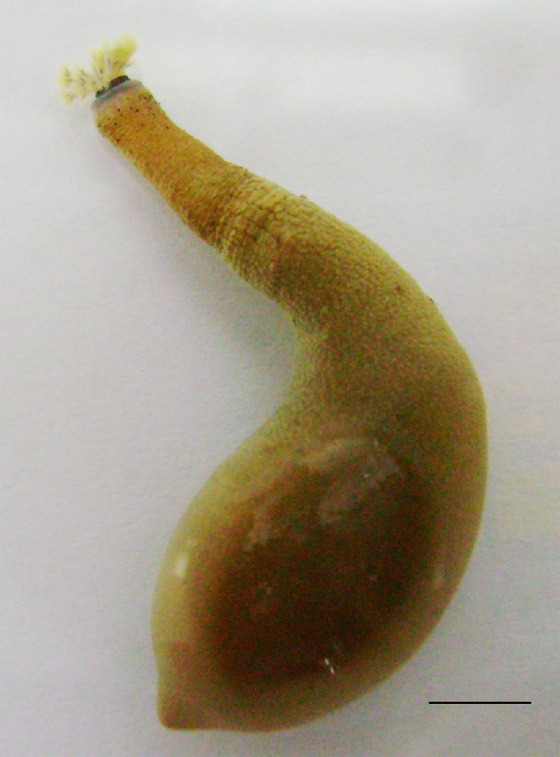
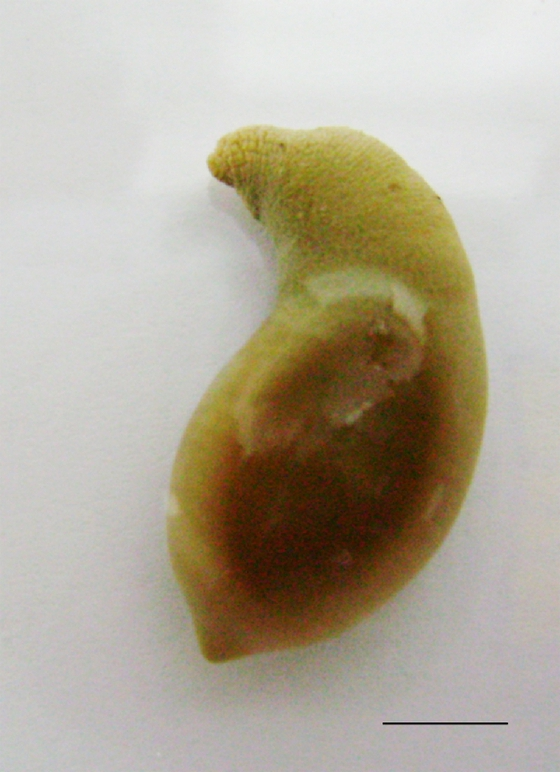
A sipunculan with introvert everted (left) and retracted

Sipunculans are worms ranging from 2 to 720 mm (0.1 to 28.3 in) in length, with most species being under 10 cm (4 in). The sipunculan body is divided into an unsegmented, bulbous trunk and a narrower, anterior section, called the "introvert". Sipunculans have a body wall somewhat similar to that of most other annelids (though unsegmented) in that it consists of an epidermis without cilia overlain by a cuticle, an outer layer of circular and an inner layer of longitudinal musculature. The body wall surrounds the coelom (body cavity) that is filled with fluid on which the body wall musculature acts as a hydrostatic skeleton to extend or contract the animal. When threatened, Sipunculid worms can contract their body into a shape resembling a peanut kernel—a practice that has given rise to the name "peanut worm". The introvert is pulled inside the trunk by two pairs of retractor muscles that extend as narrow ribbons from the trunk wall to attachment points in the introvert. It can be protruded from the trunk by contracting the muscles of the trunk wall, thus forcing the fluid in the body cavity forwards. The introvert can vary in size from half the length of the trunk to several times its length, but whatever their comparative sizes, it is fully retractable.

The mouth is located at the anterior end of the animal; in the subclass Sipunculidea, the mouth is surrounded by a mass of 18 to 24 ciliated tentacles, while in the subclass Phascolosomatidea, the tentacles are arranged in an arc above the mouth, surrounding the nuchal organ, also located at the tip of the introvert. The tentacles each have a deep groove along which food is moved to the mouth by cilia. They are used to gather organic detritus from the water or substrate, and probably also function as gills. In the family Themistidae the tentacles form an elaborate crown-like structure, the members of this group being specialized filter feeders, unlike the other groups of sipunculans which are deposit feeders. The tentacles are hollow and are extended via hydrostatic pressure in a similar manner as the introvert, but have a different mechanism from that of the rest of the introvert, being connected, via a system of ducts, to one or two contractile sacs next to the oesophagus. Hooks are often present near the mouth on the introvert. These are proteinaceous, non-chitinous specializations of the epidermis, either arranged in rings or scattered. They may be involved in scraping algae off rock, or alternatively provide anchorage.

Three genera (Aspidosiphon, Lithacrosiphon and Cloeosiphon) in the Aspidosiphonidae family possess epidermal structures, known as anal and caudal shields. These are patches of thickened, hard plates, and are used for boring into rock; the anal shield is near the anteriorly-located anus on the trunk, just below the introvert of the animal, while the caudal shield is at the posterior of the body. In Aspidosiphon and Lithacrosiphon the anal shield is restricted to the dorsal side, causing the introvert to emerge at an angle, whereas it surrounds the anterior trunk in Cloeosiphon with the introvert emerging from its center. In Aspidosiphon the shield is a hardened, horny structure; in Lithacrosiphon it is a calcareous cone; in Cloeosiphon it is composed of separate plates. When the introvert is retracted in these animals, the anal shield blocks the entrance to its burrow. At the posterior end of the trunk, a hardened caudal shield is sometimes present in Aspidosiphon; this may help with anchoring the animal in its burrow or may be used in the boring process.

=== Digestive system ===
The digestive tract of sipunculans starts with the esophagus, located between the introvert retractor muscles. In the trunk the intestine runs posteriorly, forms a loop and turns anteriorly again. The downward and upward sections of the gut are coiled around each other, forming a double helix. At the termination of the gut coil, the rectum emerges and ends in the anus, located in the anterior third of the trunk. Digestion is extra-cellular, taking place in the lumen of the intestine. A rectal caecum, present in most species, is a blind ending sac at the transition between intestine and rectum with unknown function. The anus is often not visible when the introvert is retracted into the trunk.

=== Circulation ===
Sipunculans do not have a vascular blood system. Fluid transport and gas exchange are instead accomplished by the coelom, which contains the respiratory pigment haemerythrin, and the separate tentacular system, the two being separated by an elaborate septum. The coelomic fluid contains five types of coelomic cells: haemocytes, granulocytes, large multinuclear cells, ciliated urn-shaped cells and immature cells. The ciliated urn cells may also be attached to the peritoneum and assist in waste filtering from the coelomic fluid. In Sipunculus nudus the free-floating urn cell complexes are multicellular structures. Nitrogenous waste is excreted through a pair of metanephridia opening close to the anus, except in Phascolion and Onchnesoma, which have only a single nephridium. A ciliated funnel, or nephrostome, opens into the coelomic cavity at the anterior end, close to the nephridiopore. The metanephridia have an osmoregulation function but it is unclear whether the mechanism is via filtration or secretion. They also serve as gamete storage and maintenance organs.

The tentacular coelom connects the tentacles at the tip of the introvert to a ring canal at their base, from which a contractile vessel runs along beside the esophagus and ends blindly posteriorly. Some evidence points towards the involvement of these structures in ultrafiltration. In crevice-dwelling sipunculans, respiration is mainly through the tentacular system, with oxygen diffusing into the trunk coelom from the tentacular coelom. However, in other species the skin is thin and respiration is mainly through the cuticle of the trunk, where oxygen uptake is assisted by the presence of dermal coelomic canals just beneath the epidermis. In other species, coelomic canals forms an integrated network through which coelomic fluid circulates.

=== Nervous system ===
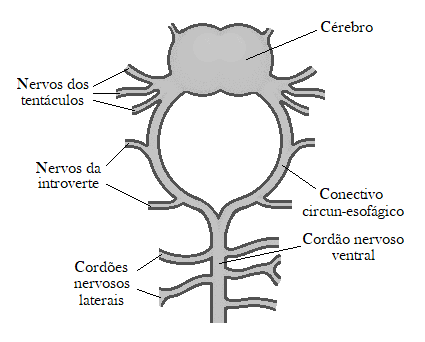
Nervous system of Sipuncula

The nervous system consists of dorsal cerebral ganglion, brain above the oesophagus and a nerve ring around the oesophagus, which links the brain with the single ventral nerve cord that runs the length of the body. Lateral nerves lead off this to innervate the muscles of the body wall.

In some species, there are simple light-sensitive ocelli associated with the brain. Two organs, likely functioning as a unit for chemoreception are located near its anterior margin; the non-ciliated cerebral organ, which possesses bipolar sensory cells, and the nuchal organ, located posterior to the brain. Similar light-sensing tubes have been reported in the fauveliopsid annelids. In addition, all sipunculans have numerous sensory nerve endings on the body wall, especially at the forward end of the introvert which is used for exploring the surrounding environment.

== Distribution and habitat ==
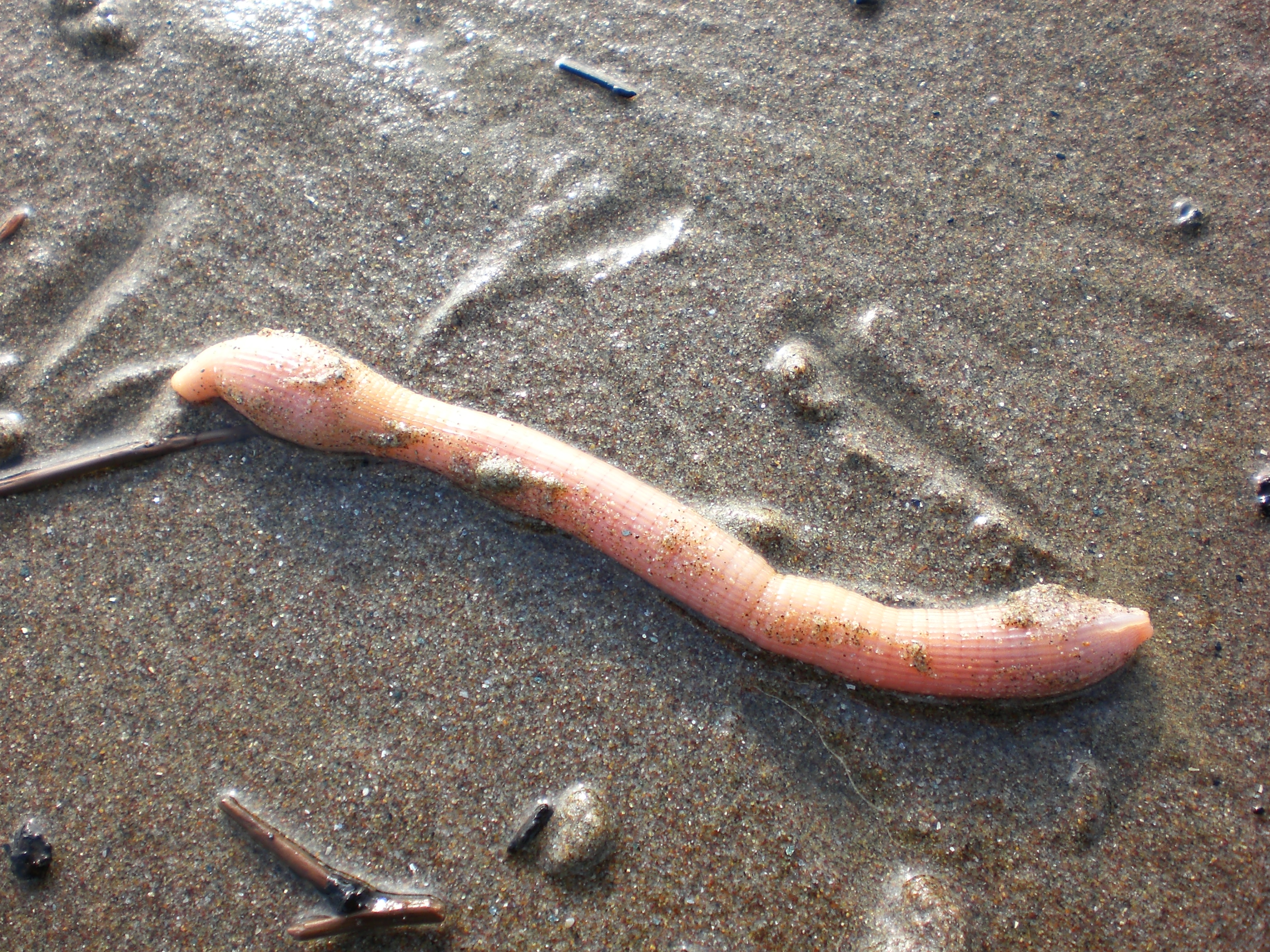
Sipunculus nudus

All sipunculid worms are marine and benthic; they are found throughout the world's oceans including polar waters, equatorial waters and the abyssal zone, but the majority of species occur in shallow water, where they are relatively common. They inhabit a range of habitats including burrowing in sand, mud, clay and gravel, hiding under stones, in rock crevices, in hollow coral heads, in wood, in empty seashells and inside the bones of dead whales. Some hide in kelp holdfasts, under tangles of eelgrass, inside sponges and in the empty tubes of other organisms, and some live among fouling organisms on man-made structures. Some bore into solid rocks to make a shelter for themselves.

They are common below the surface of the sediment on tidal flats. These worms may stay submerged in the sea bed for between 10 and 18 hours a day. They are sensitive to low salinities, and thus not commonly found near estuaries. They can also be abundant in coralline rock, and in Hawaii, up to seven hundred individuals have been found per square metre in burrows in the rock.

== Reproduction ==
Both asexual and sexual reproduction can be found in sipunculans, although asexual reproduction is uncommon and has only been observed in Aspidosiphon elegans and Sipunculus robustus. These reproduce asexually through transverse fission, followed by regeneration of vital body components, with S. robustus also reproducing by budding. One species of sipunculan, Themiste lageniformis, has been recorded as reproducing parthenogenetically; eggs produced in the absence of sperm developed through the normal stages.

Most sipunculan species are dioecious. Their gametes are produced in the coelomic lining, where they are released into the coelom to mature. These gametes are then picked up by the metanephridia system and released into the aquatic environment, where fertilisation takes place. In at least one species, Themiste pyroides, swarming behaviour occurs with adults creating compact masses among rocks immediately before spawning.

Although some species hatch directly into the adult form, many have a trochophore larva, which metamorphoses into the adult after anything from a day to a month, depending on species. In a few species, the trochophore does not develop directly into the adult, but into an intermediate pelagosphaera stage, that possesses a greatly enlarged metatroch (ciliated band). Metamorphosis occurs only in the presence of suitable habitat conditions, and is triggered by the presence of adults.

== Behaviour ==
Most sipunculans are deposit feeders employing a number of different methods to obtain their foods. Those living in burrows extend their tentacles over the surface of the sediment. Food particles get trapped in mucous secretions and the beating of cilia transport the particles to the mouth. Among those that burrow through the sand, the tentacles are replaced by fluted folds which scoop up sediment and food particles. Most of this material is swallowed but larger particles are discarded. Species dwelling in crevices are able to withdraw their introverts, blocking the crevice entrance with their thickened trunks and presumably ingesting any food they have snared at the same time. One species, Thysanocardia procera is thought to be carnivorous, gaining entrance in some way to the interior of the sea mouse Aphrodita aculeata and sucking out its liquefied contents.

== Fossil record ==
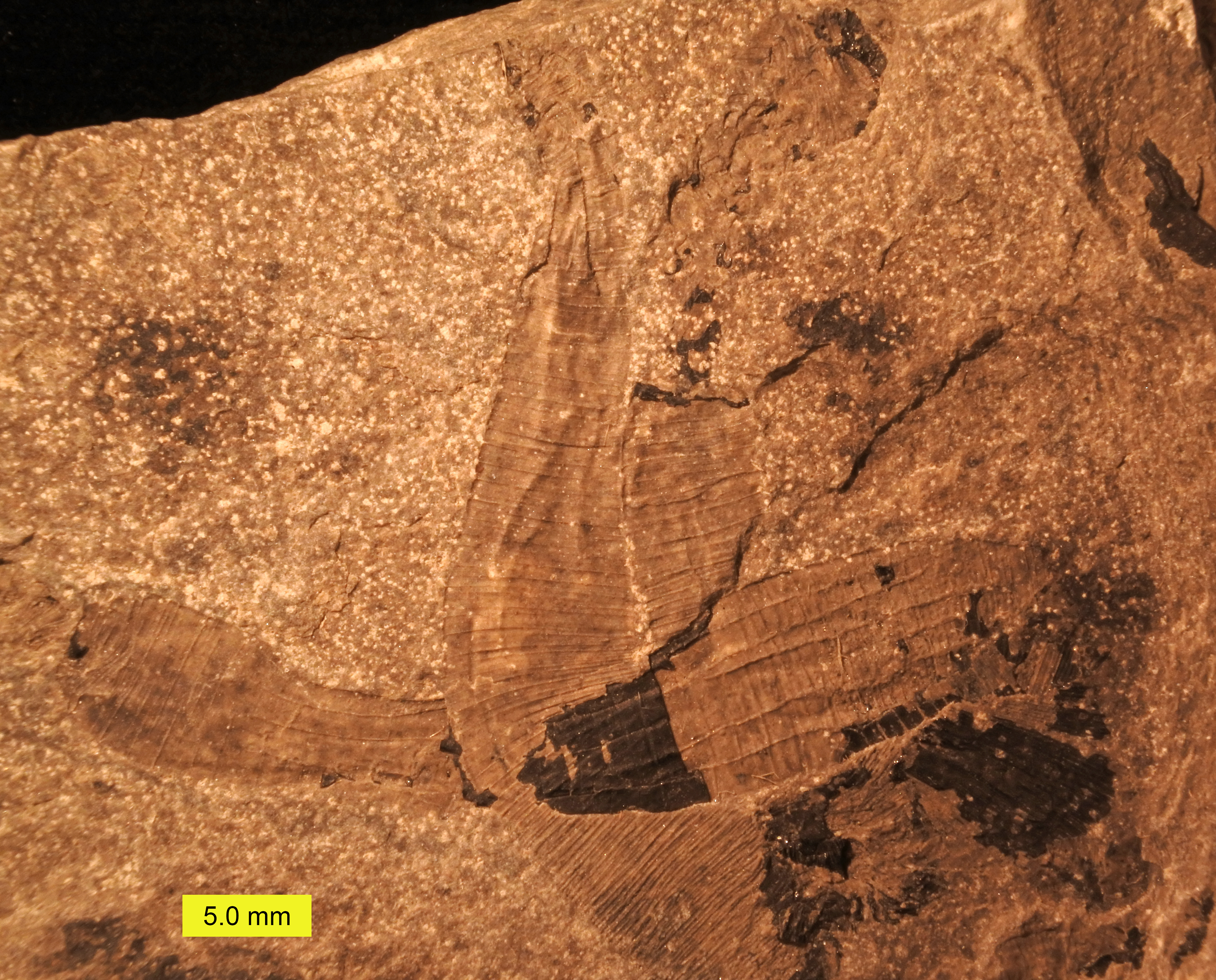
Lecthaylus gregarius, a sipunculan from the Silurian of Illinois

Because of their soft-bodied structure, fossils of sipunculans are extremely rare, and are only known from a few genera. Archaeogolfingia and Cambrosipunculus appear in the Cambrian Chengjiang biota in China. These fossils appear to belong to the crown group, and demonstrate that sipunculans have changed little (morphologically) since the early Cambrian, about 520 million years ago.

An unnamed sipunculid worm from the Cambrian period has been discovered in the Burgess Shale in Alberta, Canada, and Lecthaylus has been identified from the Granton Shrimp Bed, near Edinburgh, Scotland, dating to the Silurian period. Trace fossils of burrows that may have been formed by sipunculans have been found from the Paleozoic.

Some scientists once hypothesized a close relationship between sipunculans and the extinct hyoliths, operculate shells from the Palaeozoic with which they share a helical gut; but this hypothesis has since been discounted.

== As food ==
Sipunculid worm jelly (土笋凍) is a delicacy in southeast China, originally from Anhai, near Quanzhou; a different species (Phascolosoma esculenta) is eaten in Guangdong as 泥丁.

A sipunculid worm dish is also considered a delicacy in the islands of the Visayas region, Philippines. The muscle is first prepared by soaking it in spiced vinegar and then served with other ingredients as a dish similar to ceviche. It is a basic food for local fisherman and is sometimes seen in city restaurants as an appetizer. This style of food preparation is locally called kilawin or kinilaw, and is also used for fish, conch and vegetables.

The worms, especially in dried form, are considered a delicacy in Vietnam as well, where they are caught on the coasts of Minh Chao island, in Van Don District. The relatively high market price of the worms have made them a significant source of income for the local population of fishermen families.

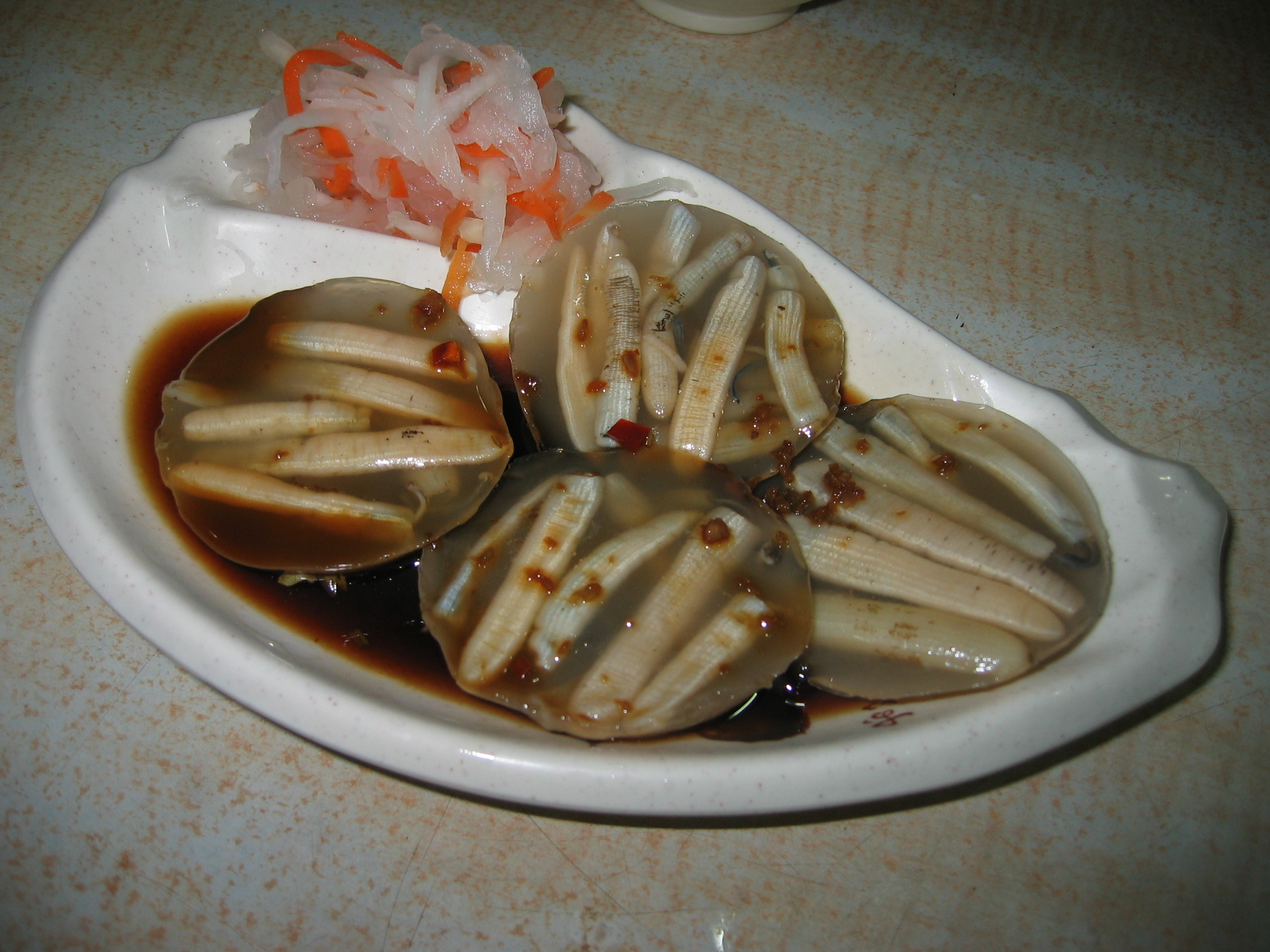
A plate of Sipunculid worm jelly

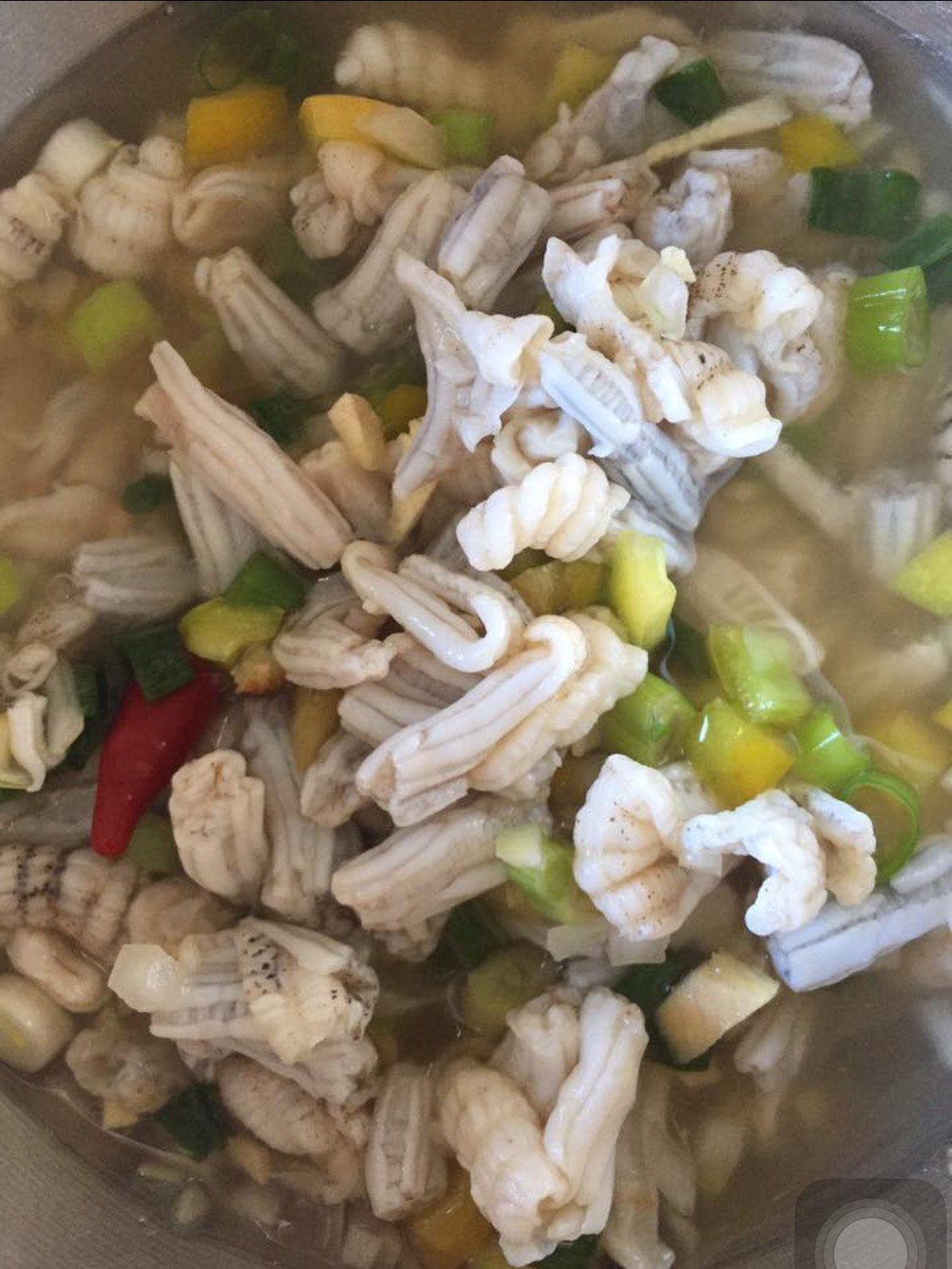
This sipunculid worm dish is made by adding vinegar and local spices. Taken in Cebu, Philippines.
