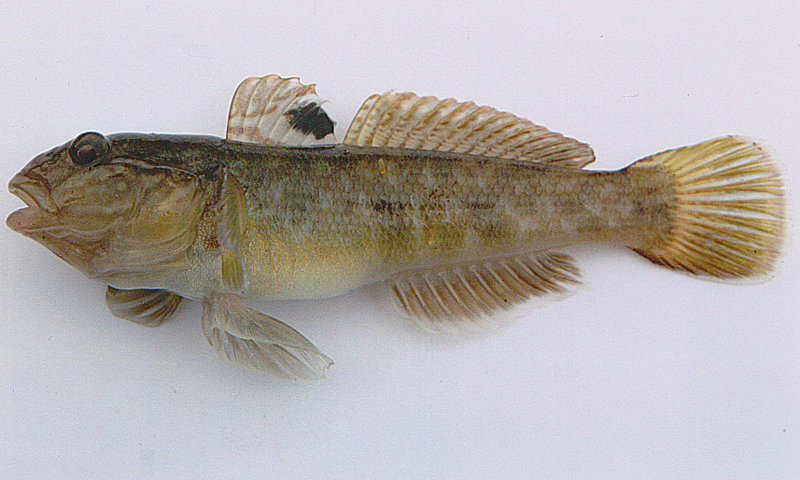

Conservation status
- Least Concern (IUCN 3.1)

Scientific classification
- Kingdom: Animalia
- Phylum: Chordata
- Class: Actinopterygii
- Division: Teleostei
- Order: Gobiiformes
- Family: Gobiidae
- Genus: Neogobius
- Species: N. melanostomus

Binomial name
- Neogobius melanostomus (Pallas, 1814)
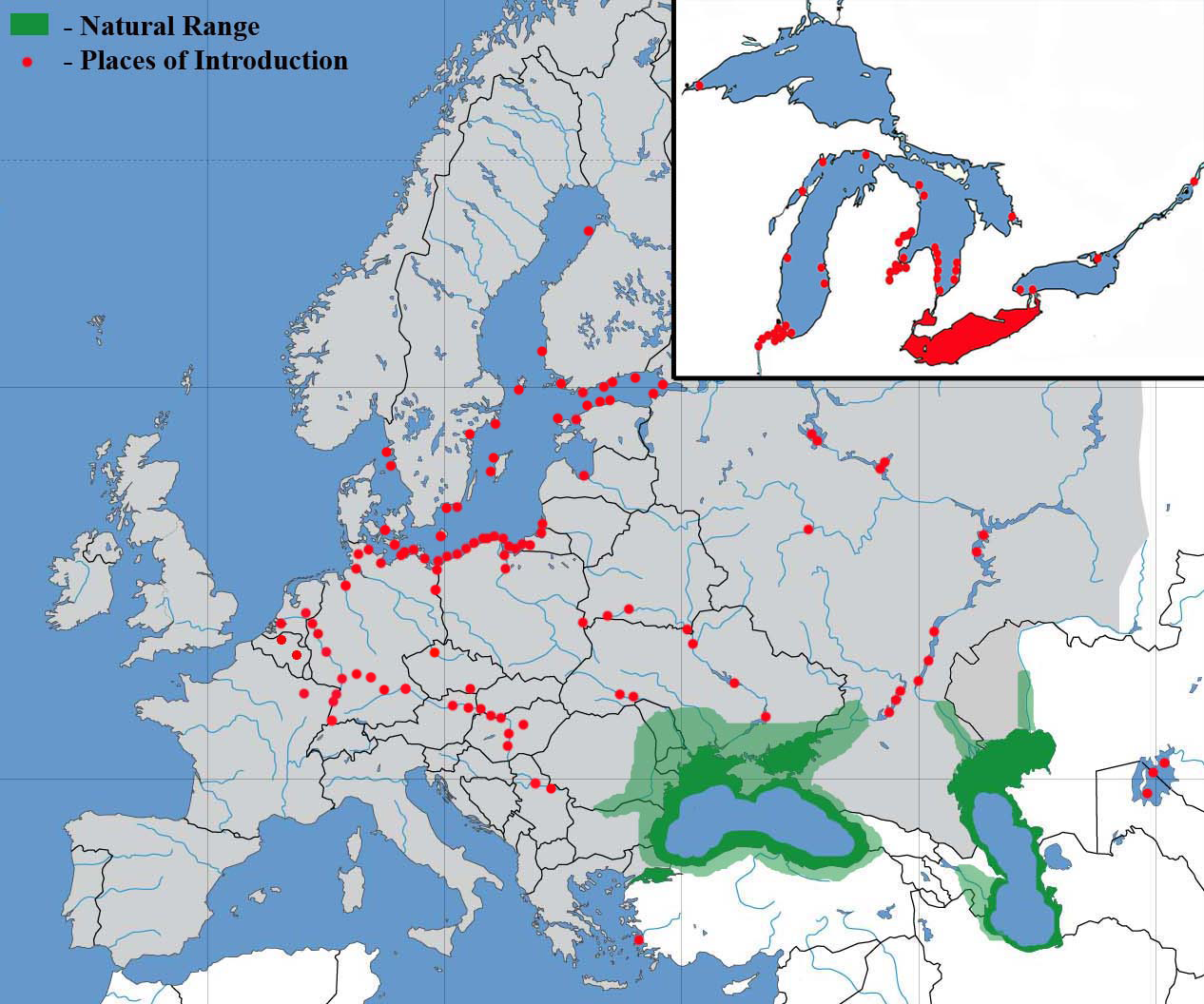
- Range of the round goby and introduction sites

Synonyms
- List: Gobius affinis Eichwald, 1831; Gobius cephalarges Pallas, 1814; Gobius chilo Pallas, 1814; Gobius exanthematosus Pallas, 1814; Gobius grossholzii Steindachner, 1894; Gobius lugens Nordmann, 1840; Gobius marmoratus (non Risso or Pallas) Antipa, 1909; Gobius melanio Pallas, 1814; Gobius melanostomus Pallas, 1814; Gobius sulcatus Eichwald, 1831; Gobius virescens Pallas, 1814; Neogobius cephalarges (Pallas, 1814); Apollonia melanostoma (Pallas, 1814); Ponticola cephalarges (Pallas, 1814)

= Round goby =

Species of fish

The round goby (Neogobius melanostomus) is a euryhaline bottom-dwelling species of fish of the family Gobiidae. It is native to Central Eurasia, including the Black Sea and the Caspian Sea. Round gobies have established large non-native populations in the Baltic Sea, several major Eurasian rivers, and the North American Great Lakes.

== Characteristics ==
Round gobies are small, soft-bodied fish characterized by a distinctive black spot on the first dorsal fin. The eyes are large and protrude slightly from the top of the head and, like most gobies, the pelvic fins are fused to form a single disc (shaped like a suction cup) on the belly. Round gobies range in length from 10 to 25 centimetres (4 to 10 inches), with a maximum size of 24.6 cm (9.7 in). They weigh between 5.0 and 79.8 grams (0.176 and 2.816 ounces), their weight increasing with age. Male round gobies are larger than females. Juvenile round gobies (less than one year old) are grey. Upon maturation, round gobies become mottled with grey, black, brown, and olive green markings. Adult male round gobies turn inky black during the spawning season and develop swollen cheeks. Male and female round gobies are easily differentiated by the shape of their urogenital papilla, which in males is white to grey and long and pointed and in females is brown, short, and blunt-tipped.

== Distribution and habitat ==
Round gobies are widespread in the Sea of Marmara and in the rivers of its basin and can also be found in the Black Sea and the Sea of Azov, along all coasts and fresh waters of their basins as well as in the coastal lakes and lagoons. They are also found in the rivers of Crimea and the Caucasus (Mezib, Pshada, Vulan, Kodori, and Çoruh) and in the Caspian Sea, represented by subspecies Neogobius melanostomus affinis.

Round gobies are euryhaline (salt-tolerant) and live in both freshwater and marine ecosystems, up to a mineralization of 18–24%. They are commonly found on continental shelves with sandy and rocky bottoms with low silting at depths from 1–2 m (3.3–6.6 ft) to 10–17 m (33–56 ft).

=== Introduced range ===
Since 1990, the round goby has been registered as introduced in the North American Great Lakes, in parts of Europe, and in the Baltic Sea as an invasive species. The first catch in North America was documented by Jude et al. 1992 and Crossman et al. 1992, caught by an angler in Sarnia, Ontario, fishing the St. Clair River on June 28, 1990. The studies of Jude, Crossman, together with Jude et al. 1995 found a range of sizes between 29 and 180 millimetres (1 1/8 and 7 1/8 in) in the St. Clair. Round gobies are also rapidly expanding into tributaries of the Great Lakes in North America and were recently discovered in at least one of the Finger Lakes in New York State (Cayuga Lake). The first round goby in the Hudson River was discovered by the state of New York in 2021.

The round goby is also considered invasive in parts of Europe. This process was started by its introduction to the Gulf of Gdańsk (southern Baltic Sea) in 1990. Locations recently invaded by round gobies include the Aegean Sea, different parts of the Baltic Sea, the North Sea basin, and the Danube and Rhine basins. In the German part of the Baltic Sea this fish was first noted near Rügen Island. It is now distributed all along the southwestern Baltic Sea coast, including Stettiner Haff (Szczecin Lagoon), the Unterwarnow (Warnow river estuary), the mouth of the Trave, and the Nord-Ostsee (Kiel) Canal.

As of 2010, the westernmost site of round goby occurrence in Europe was the lower Scheldt, including the tidal zone in the river mouth, and Albert Canal, Belgium. In 2011, the round goby began invading the fresh waters of France; the species appeared in the Rhine River (on the border between France and Germany) and in the French part of the Moselle River.

In the Volga-Kama basin, the round goby has successfully colonized all major reservoirs of the Volga River and has been recorded as far upstream as the upper part of the Votkinsk Reservoir in the Kama River. Genetic analysis of the Volga populations reveals a complex structure, indicating multiple invasion pathways and the mixing of phylogenetic lineages originating from both the Azov-Black Sea basin and the Caspian Sea. Genetic analysis of invasive populations in the Volga River basin has revealed a complex population structure comprising at least three distinct phylogenetic lineages based on mitochondrial and nuclear markers. Two lineages are distributed in the Upper and Middle Volga reservoirs, while a third is found in the Middle Volga and its lower reaches. This structure suggests multiple invasion pathways from both Azov-Black Sea and Caspian donor regions, with the Middle Volga reservoirs acting as a secondary mixing zone for these genetic lineages.

== Feeding ==
Round gobies actively feed both nocturnally and diurnally and are believed to detect prey only while stationary. The primary diet of round gobies includes mollusks, crustaceans, worms, zebra mussels, insect larvae, and other small invertebrates (insects and amphipods) living on the bottom of lakes and streams. In spring, the main elements of their diet in the Sasyk Lagoon are Hydrobia, Cerastoderma, and Abra. In the same season, near the Romanian coasts of the Black Sea, the round goby feeds on polychaetes, crustaceans (Idotea balthica, Pachygrapsus marmoratus, Xantho poressa, etc.), and juvenile gobies. Near Sevastopol, the round goby feeds on molluscs (Mytilaster lineatus and Abra sp.). In the Baltic Sea, they impact Mytilus edulis populations.

In the Gulf of Odessa, twenty-three items are identified in the diet of the round goby; Mytilus galloprovincialis, Setia pulcherrima, Mytilaster lineatus, Lentidium mediterraneum, Idotea balthica, and Alitta (Nereis) succinea dominate in the spring, while in the summer, the diet consists mainly of Sphaeroma pulchellum and L. mediterraneum. The mussels M. galloprovincialis and M. lineatus are important in all seasons. In the Great Lakes, where it is invasive, they prey on Dreissena polymorpha, another Great Lakes exotic from the same native region.

== Reproduction ==
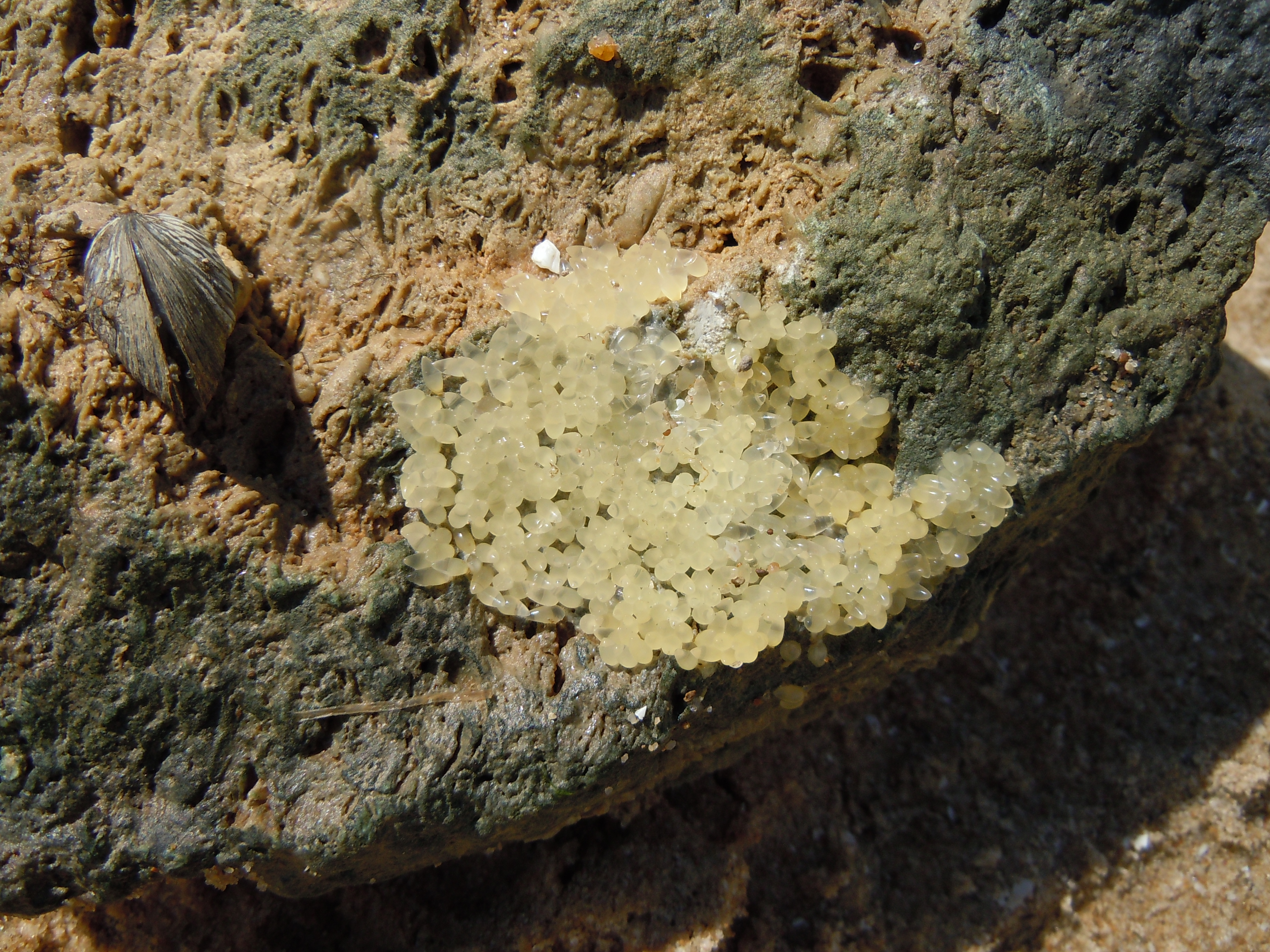
Round goby eggs on rocks, Dniester Estuary, Ukraine

Female round gobies reach sexual maturity in one to two years while males do so in three to four years. Gobies in the Laurentian Great Lakes typically mature up to one year earlier than in their native habitat in Europe. Females can spawn up to six times during the spawning season, which spans April to September in most areas.

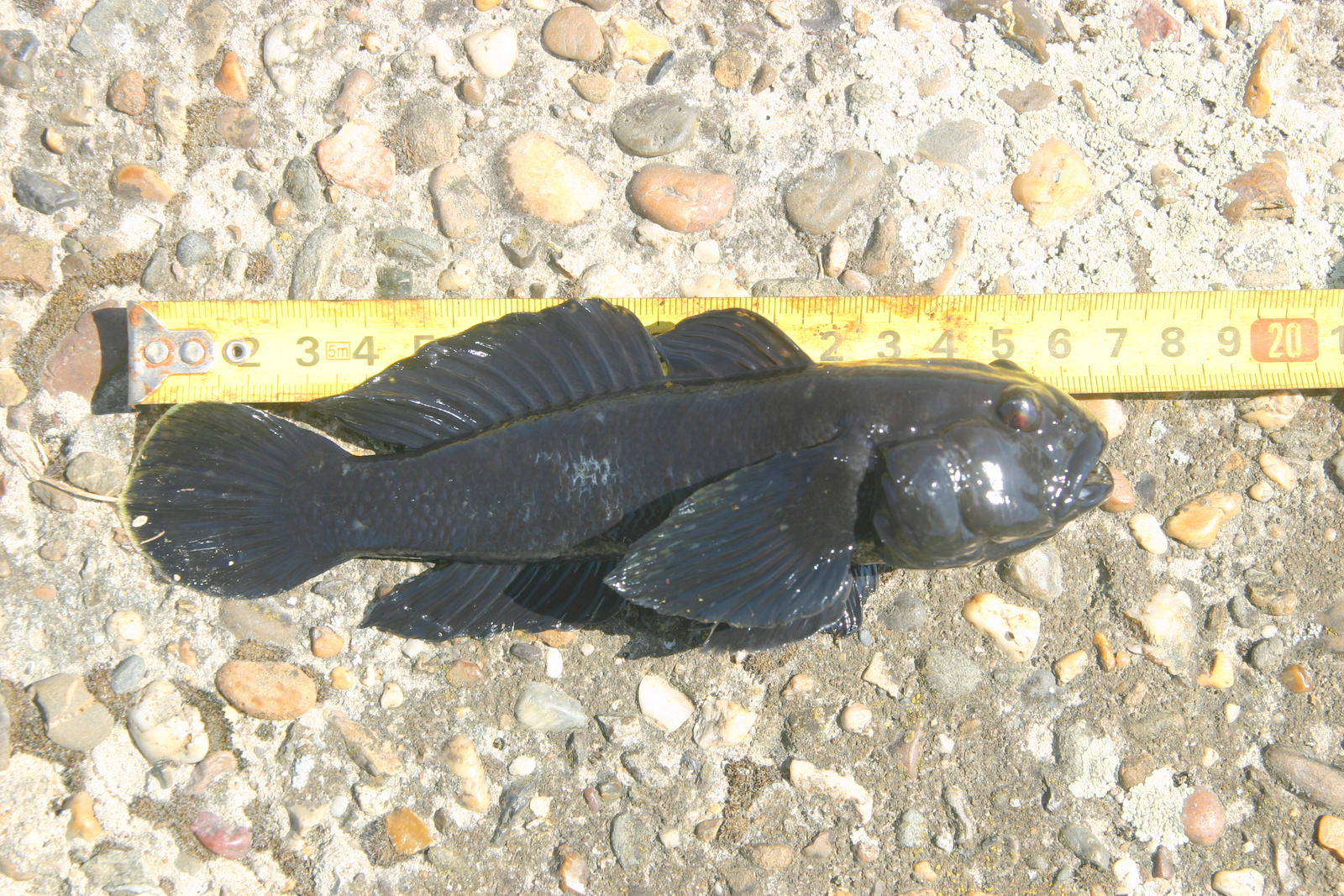
Male in breeding colours

Males will migrate from deeper water, where overwintering occurs, into shallower breeding grounds during the beginning of the mating season. They then release a steroid sex pheromone that attracts females to their territory. Males also use visual displays, including posturing and changing color from beige to black during mating season, and can produce sounds during courtship. The females deposit their eggs in male-guarded crevices between rocks. Eggs are 4 by 2.2 mm (0.16 by 0.087 in) in size, while egg clutches can contain up to five thousand eggs. Males are territorial and will defend eggs from predators as well as continuously fan them to provide the developing embryos with oxygenated water. This results in successful hatch rates of up to 95%.

== Invasive species ==
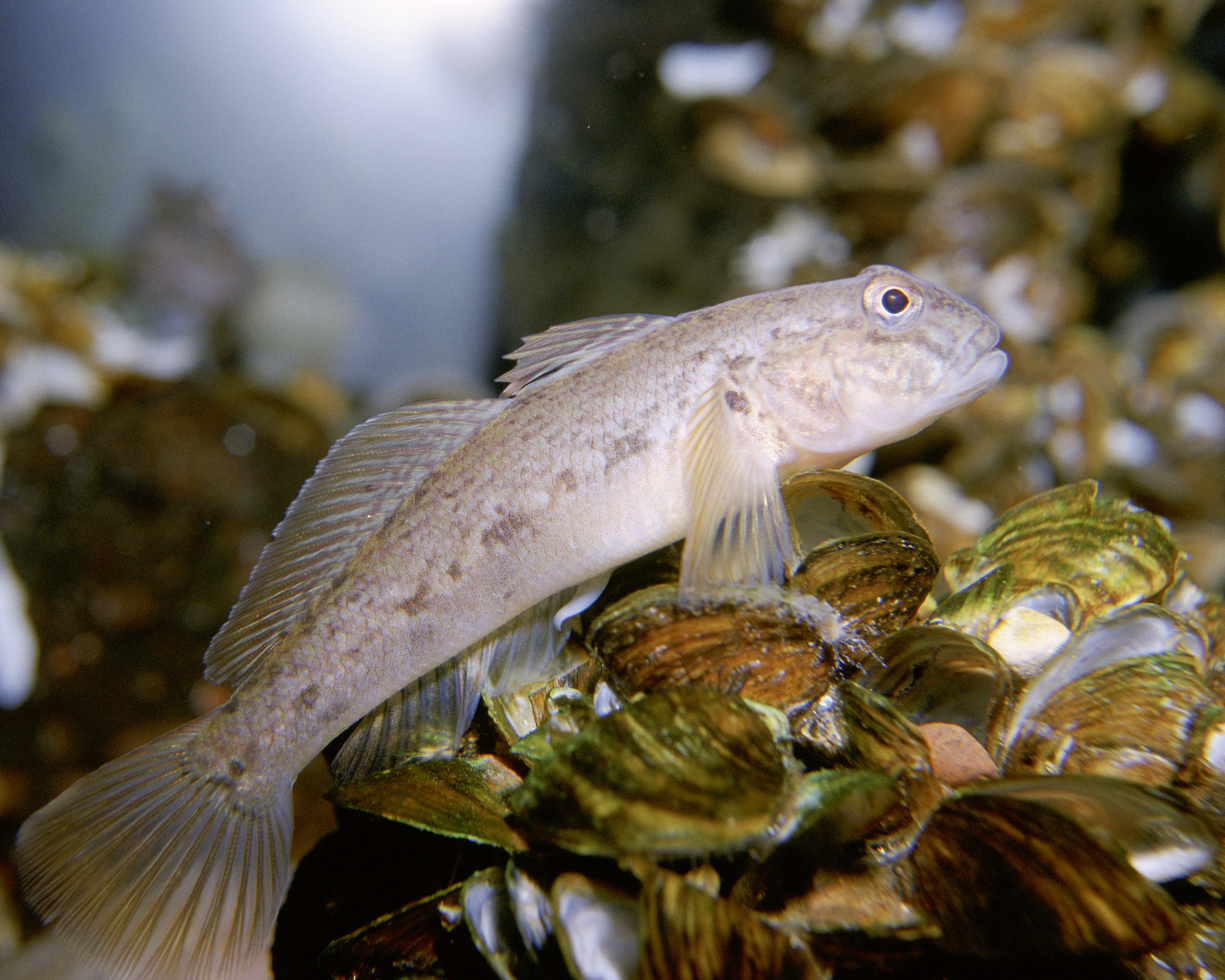
Round goby from the Great Lakes, United States

The species was accidentally introduced into the North American Great Lakes by way of ballast water transfer in cargo ships. First discovered in North America in the St. Clair River in 1990, the round goby is considered an invasive species with significant ecological and economic impact. The consequences of introduction are quite complex, as the fish both competes with native species and provides an abundant source of food for them, while consuming other invasive species itself. In other words, the round goby behaves much like most biological invasive controls. An aggressive fish, the round goby outcompetes native species such as the sculpin and logperch for food (such as snails and mussels), shelter, and nesting sites, substantially reducing their numbers. The goby's robust ability to survive in degraded environmental conditions has helped to increase its competitive advantage compared to native species.

Many native predatory fish such as smallmouth bass, largemouth bass, walleye, lake trout, lake whitefish, burbot, lake sturgeon, salmon, and trout have begun to prey on round gobies. The incorporation of the round goby into native foodwebs, coupled with the goby's ability to consume large numbers of invasive mussels (zebra and quagga), may result in greater bioaccumulation of toxins such as PCBs higher in the food chain, since these mussels filter-feed and are known to accumulate persistent contaminants. However, this is partly beneficial because even though they do not reduce the population of zebra mussels, they do control their population. Hence, it prevents a large-scale spread of the zebra mussel, which is also an invasive species in the Great Lakes. Another unintended benefit of the round goby's introduction is that the Lake Erie watersnake, once listed as a threatened species, has found the goby to be a highly favorable addition to its diet. A recent study found the introduced fish now accounts for up to 90% of the snake's prey; this new food source means that the water snake is now staging a comeback. In 2017, round goby also made up over 86% of the recorded diet by weight of native lake sturgeon in the Niagara River region, where it had become the sturgeons' most important vertebrate prey. In Lake Erie, round gobies also became the most common prey item for burbot, entering their recorded diet in 2000-2001 and overtaking their previous most common prey item, rainbow smelt, around 2003. This predation forms a primary control mechanism for goby populations, as around 60% of a given year's gobies are estimated to be eaten by burbot. A recovery in burbot population between 1985 and 2000 was, consequently, associated with the leveling off and stabilizing of round goby population growth in the lake.

== Parasites ==
In total, fifty-two parasite species are registered in the round goby in its native area. The most abundant parasites of the Black Sea round goby are metacercariae of trematodes of the Heterophyidae family, such as Cryptocotyle concavum, C. lingua, and Pygidiopsis genata. The trematodes C. lingua and P. genata can infest humans. In the 1950s, along the coast of the Gulf of Taganrog (Sea of Azov), the round goby was registered as a host of epizootic nematodes Tetrameres fissispina and Streptocara crassicauda, which were fatal to ducklings.

In the Gulf of Gdańsk, Baltic Sea, the parasites of the invasive round goby consist of twelve species. The core of the parasite fauna comprises two species of trematode metacercariae: C. concavum and Diplostomum spathaceum. Also in the Baltic Sea, the round goby is a paratenic host of the invasive nematode Anguillicoloides crassus. In the Vistula Lagoon, the most abundant parasites of the round goby are nematodes Hysterothylacium aduncum and Anguillicoloides crassus.

Twenty-five species of parasites are noted in the round goby in the American Great Lakes. The trematode D. spathaceum is the most abundant core species overall, while the cestode Proteocephalus sp. and the trematode Neochasmus umbellus are also well represented. The round goby may prevent some of the metacercariae of N. umbellus from completing their life cycle. The parasite "load" on the invasive gobies in the Great Lakes appears relatively low in comparison with their native habitats, lending support to the "enemy release hypothesis".
