= Seashore wildlife =

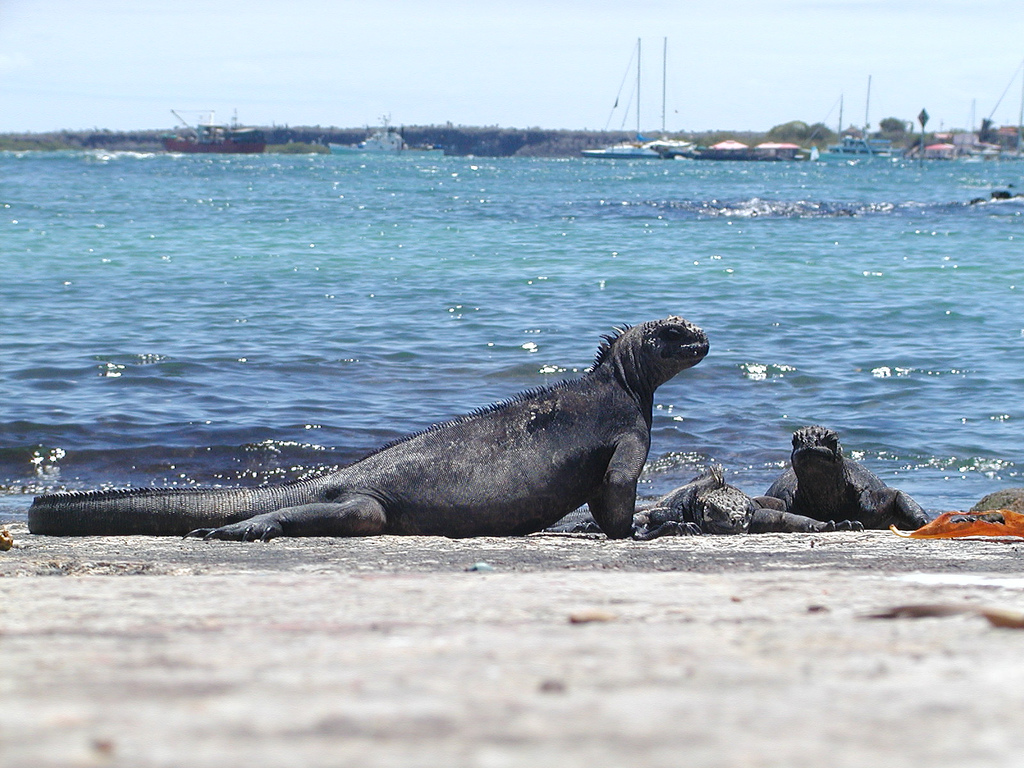
A marine iguana, Amblyrhynchus cristatus, on a wharf at Santa Cruz Island, Galapagos

Seashore wildlife habitats exist from the Tropics to the Arctic and Antarctic. Seashores and beaches provide varied habitats in different parts of the world, and even within the same beach. Phytoplankton is at the bottom of some food chains, while zooplankton and other organisms eat phytoplankton. Kelp is also autotrophic and at the bottom of many food chains. Coastal areas are stressed through rapid change, for example due to tides.

== British seashores ==
The coasts around Great Britain and the sea nearby are of international significance. Animal life varies from large whales, dolphins and porpoises, grey seals and common seals, through to microscopic animals. There are more than 200 species of fish, ranging from small fish like blennies through to basking sharks that are the second largest shark in the world.

Habitats include areas of landslips, beaches with sand, shingle and rock, cliffs, coastal lagoons, isolated sea stacks and islands, muddy estuaries, salt marshes, submaritime zones (i.e. land influenced by sea spray) and the sea itself. British coasts are affected by strong winds and in some areas large waves. British tidal ranges are large compared to some other parts of the world. Sheltered shores support different life from exposed shores.

Non-flowering plants range from microscopic plants to seaweed or kelp up to 5 meters in height. Many animals feed on kelp and kelp provides sheltered habitats for yet others. Sea grass is the only type of flowering plant that grows in British seas, but it nonetheless forms vast beds.

Invertebrates in coastal Britain are very diverse and include brittle stars, hermit crabs, mussels, prawns, sponges, sea anemones and sea squirts. Efforts are made to conserve rare plants and animals in nature reserves.

Cliffs, islands and sea stacks are a habitat for breeding sea birds such as guillemots, kittiwake and razor bills, as well as rock doves which can live inland as well. Peregrine falcons hunt the doves. Estuaries provide a habitat for waders and ducks, especially in winter.

== West African seashores ==
The coastline of West Africa extends from Senegal to Gabon and like many other coastlines worldwide, it is characterized by a variety of ecosystems (Yankson and Kendall, 2001). Common on this coast are sandy shores interspersed with rocky shores and several rivers, which empty into the Gulf of Guinea. Well-known rocky beaches on the West African coast include Cape Verde in Senegal, Cape Three Points in Ghana and Mount Cameroon. There are other smaller rocky beaches and between them are sandy beaches, which may be small, or extensive (Yankson and Kendall, 2001). On the coast of Ghana for instance, the greatest extent of almost continuous rock shore is on either side of Cape Three Points and stretches from the Ankobra River in the west to Sekondi in the east, a distance of about 45 miles. The west of the Ankobra is characterized by sandy beaches extending through Ivory Coast. Also, between Takoradi and Prampram, 150 miles to the east, sandy shores dominate but rocky shores of limited extent occur in several places, notably in the region of Cape Coast and Elmina and in the Accra area. At the east of Prampram, sandy beaches stretch almost continuously along the eastern coast of Ghana and throughout Nigeria until a rocky shore is met with again in the Cameroons (Gauld and Buchanan, 1959).

Various surveys of the West African seashore have found barnacles and gastropods dominating the invertebrate community (Gauld and Buchanan, 1959; Yankson and Akpabey, 2001; Yankson and Kendall, 2001; Lamptey, Armah and Allotey, 2009).

Three species of barnacles, namely Cthamalus dentatus, Megabalanus tintinnabulum and Tetraclita squamata are found on the West African rocky shores. C. dentatus is the common barnacle of open coasts. They have a kite shaped opening to the shell. Six plates are clearly visible in isolated individuals. The plates have projecting ribs giving the animal a star-shaped outline. Recently settled animals are a pale brown color but as they age, they quickly become dirty white. C. dentatus have no calcareous base between the body of the animal and the rock surface (Edmunds, 1978; Yankson and Kendall, 2001).

Tetraclita squamata tends to be conical in shape and can reach a large size (25mm or more in length). Unlike Chthamalus species, it does not occur in vast sheets of interlocking animals. The plates making up the shell become fused as the animal grows and in large specimens can be difficult to distinguish. The plates are perforated by rows of fine holes. This species is often heavily overgrown by algae (Yankson and Kendall, 2001).

Megabalanus tintinnabulum is found worldwide and has been described on this site.

The most common hermit crabs on this shore are Clibernarius chapini and Clibernarius senegalensis. Identification of species is complex but the common rule is C. chapini occurs mostly in long turreted gastropod shells while C. senegalensis in short, more rounded shells (Yankson and Kendall, 2001).

Three types of keyhole limpets, family Fissurellidae are encountered on the West African seashore.

Diodora menkeana (Dunker) has an aperture length between 6–15 mm; height about half its length and a small apical hole markedly anterior. It has sculpture of intersecting radiating and concentric ridges, color may be cream, pale pink or brown. This species occurs throughout West Africa in shallow and low on rocky shores though rare (Yankson and Kendall, 2001).

The genus Fissurella is distinguished from Diodora by its flatter shell, a larger more central apical hole, sculpture of only radiating ridges and height about a third of its length. Species of this genus are found low on the shore attached to rocks from which they scrape minute algae. They rest on open rock and do not seek crevices (Yankson and Kendall, 2001). Two species has been recorded.

Fissurella coarctata has a large apical hole and of characteristic shape, color pale pink or brown. It has a length of about 25–35 mm. This species is fairly common in Senegal and Sierra Leone, rare in Ghana and has not been recorded further east (Yankson and Kendall, 2001).

Fissurella nubecula has an aperture length of 15–25 mm, medium sized apical hole and color pink or violet often with radiating white bands. This species is common from Ghana eastwards and in Senegal though it seems to be rarer in between. It is commoner in sheltered rather than in exposed areas (Yankson and Kendall, 2001).

Siphonaria pectinata (Family: Siphonariidae, described on another page) has an aperture length of 20–30 mm long, slightly less wide, height about half its length or more, sculpture of fine radiating ridges, often worn smooth at apex. This species has a color that is externally dark brown or grey, paler at worn apex, internally shining black at edges, paler at center. It is common at all levels on the West African rocky shores and it rests on exposed shores (Edmunds, 1978).

Patella safiana (see Cymbula safiana, family Patellidae) has an oval aperture height about 40–60 mm or more. It is sculptured by radiating ridges, colored grey externally, and blue-grey and white internally, with a horseshoe shaped paler scar, which is interrupted anteriorly to make room for the head. It is found throughout West Africa usually common on open rocks from low to mid shore or sometimes higher on exposed shores. It is often found in damp hollows, but does not particularly seek crevices. It feeds by scraping minute algae and grasping pieces of seaweeds. Each individual rests in the same place and wears a slight depression in the rock into which the shell fits exactly. It is hard to remove when attached to the rock with its foot (Edmunds, 1978).

Nerita senegalensis (Family Neritiidae) has shell height and width almost the same length, 15–20 mm, with teeth occurring on the outer lip of aperture. It has a pleated collumella with irregular tubercles and very fine spiral ridges on shell. This species has a dark grey color with small paler markings and sometimes uniformly yellow color. This is one of the commonest gastropod species on West African rocky shores, occurring from low tide level to the upper shore. It usually rests in crevices when the tide is out, and may also be found on the open rock and in rocky pools. In Senegal, it extends into rocky estuaries (Yankson and Kendall, 2001).

Three species of the gastropod family Littorinidae are common on the West Africa shore. Littorina punctata has a shell height of about 8–15 mm, color brown or grey with white markings in spiral rows often giving a checked appearance. This species is usually common on all rocky West African shores, occurring from the middle to upper parts, though young specimen occur lower down and in rock pools (Yankson and Kendall, 2001).

Littorina cinguilifera has a shell height of about 8–12 mm, color alternating brown or grey and white bands, the darker bands sometimes interrupted with white dots especially near the top of the whorl. This species occurs from the middle to upper parts of rocky shores and extends into rocky estuaries. It is usually rarer than the previous species though common in Sierra Leone, it is rare in Senegal and probably Nigeria but extends to Cameroun (Yankson and Kendall, 2001).

Littorina angulifera (Littoraria angulifera) Thais species (Muricidae) have wide oval aperture, notched at base; columella callosity smooth and arched; operculum is horny thin, nucleus at outside edge; sculpture of rounded or pointed tubercles. This genus is distributed worldwide. The species found on the West Africa shore are Thais forbesi, Thais nodosa, Thais callifera and Thais haemostoma.

Thais nodosa shell height is about 40–55 mm, width somewhat less; body whorl large, spire short and blunt; outer lip is spreading outwards; columella callosity broad, almost flat, white with usually two purple spots on it, sculpture of five spiral rows or rounded tubercles, the two upper ones being the most prominent; color pale fawn. This is a fairly common species low on rocky shores especially in crevices under overhanging rocks, etc (Yankson and Kendall, 2001).

Thais haemostoma (see Stramonita haemastoma described on this site).

Thais forbesi shell height is about 25–35 mm, width somewhat less and aperture about half height of shell. It is not usually toothed; spire somewhat pointed; two or three spiral rows of pointed tubercles. This species is grey to brown in color, often overgrown; and inside of the aperture is grey(Yankson and Kendall, 2001).

Thais callifera has a shell height of 30 – 70 mm, with width slightly less, aperture notched near suture as well as below; body whorl large, spire short and blunt, sculpture two or four rows or rounded tubercles, color pale fawn, inside of aperture pale orange. This species has been recorded in Nigeria and Cameroun. Shells may sometimes be confused with Thais haemostoma, but are paler and fatter (Yankson and Kendall, 2001).

Rotula sp. (Echinodermata: West African sand dollar) have the appearance of flattened sea urchin. They are circular to heart shaped in outline and little more than the thickness of a coin in depth. A mat of flat lying spines covers them. Sand dollars bury into intertidal sand leaving a characteristic mark at the sediment surface. This species had been recorded in Ghana though rare (Yankson and Kendall, 2001).

Other species found on the West Africa shore such as sea anemone, Perna perna, Ocypode cursor, Diadema antillarum have already been described on this site.

== Northeastern United States Seashores ==
The Northeast region of coastline in the U.S. ranges from Maine to Virginia, and encompasses 11 states in total. The region holds multiple important ecosystems such as the Gulf of Maine, Midatlantic Bight, and Georges Bank. These ecosystems are home to thousands of marine plant and animal species, as well as over 180 different species of seabirds.

== Pacific United States Seashores ==
Wildlife on the Pacific coast of the United States is home to many different families of animals, such as birds, mammals, fish, reptiles, amphibians, and invertebrates, both terrestrial and aquatic. In the San Francisco Bay Area network of national parks alone, there are over 250 species of birds. Point Reyes National Seashore is home to almost 40 different species of land mammals, and the area also provides haul-out and breeding sites for multiple species of seals and sea lions. Oregon's seashore also provides a habitat for many animals, such as the high-speed peregrine falcon, the dungeness crab, or social California sea lion.

== See also ==
- Rocky shores
