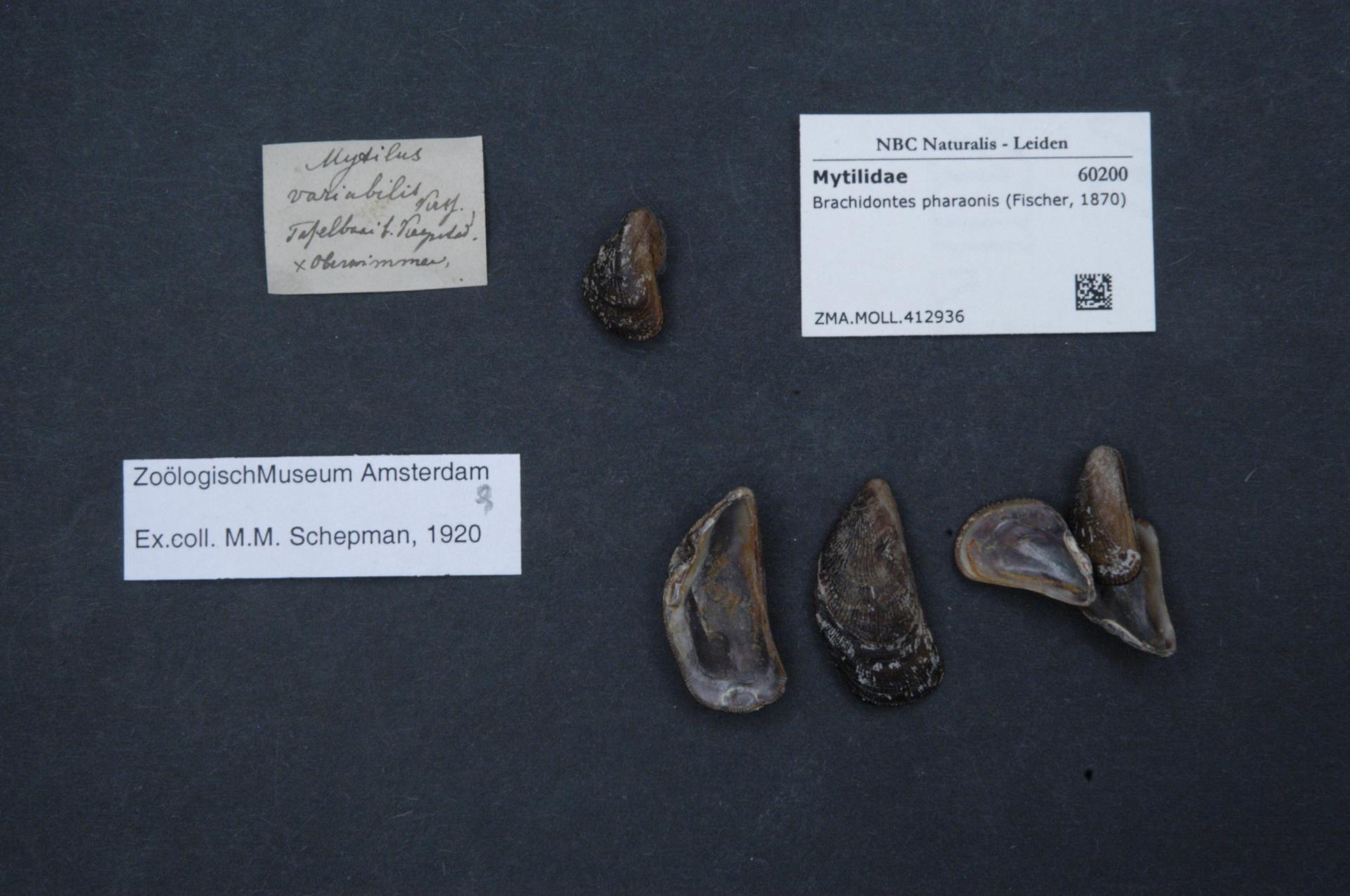
- Museum specimens of the shell of Brachidontes pharaonis

Scientific classification
- Kingdom: Animalia
- Phylum: Mollusca
- Class: Bivalvia
- Order: Mytilida
- Family: Mytilidae
- Genus: Brachidontes
- Species: B. pharaonis

Binomial name
- Brachidontes pharaonis (Fischer P., 1870)

Synonyms
- Brachidontes arabicus Lamy, 1919; Brachyodontes karachiensis Melvill & Standen, 1907; Modiola compressula Martens & Thiele, 1908; Mytilus arabicus Jousseaume in Lamy, 1919; Mytilus pharaonis P. Fischer, 1870

= Brachidontes pharaonis =

Species of bivalve

Brachidontes pharaonis is a species of mussel from the family Mytilidae. It is native to the Indian Ocean and the Red Sea, and has colonised the Mediterranean Sea where it is regarded as an invasive species.

== Description ==
Brachidontes pharaonis is a small bivalve that grows its shell up to 40mm in length. The external surfaces of the shell are dark brownish black while the interior of the shell is purplish-black. The two halves of the shell are equal in size and similar in shape, being elongated and asymmetrical, with a dysodont hinge between the valves. The sculpture of the valves consists of numerous fine radial bifurcating ribs, which become coarser posteriorly and finely scalloped towards the edge. The outline is mytiliform with a terminal umbo, but the shape is very variable and specimens may be highly expanded posteriorly, occasionally curved; sometimes almost cylindrical with the beaks being sub-terminal. The animal is attached to the substrate by thick byssus.

== Habitat ==
Brachidontes pharaonis is found on rocky substrates and man made structures in the intertidal zone. They appear to be able to tolerate wide temperature variations in their invasive Mediterranean range, but low winter temperatures may inhibit their physiology. In the cooler waters of the western Mediterranean, B. pharaonis is restricted to habitats with higher temperatures and salinities, where it establishes dense mussel beds on hard substrates, especially where it is sheltered from waves.

== Distribution ==
=== Native ===
Brachidontes pharaonis is native only to the Red Sea and adjacent Indian Ocean (see Taxonomy).

=== Invasive ===
Brachidontes pharaonis was first recorded in the Mediterranean Sea in 1876 off Port Said in Egypt, reaching Lebanon, Israel and Palestine by the 1930s; Sicily by 1971; Greece by 1979; Syria and Turkey by 1985, Rhodes by 1989, Cyprus by 1996, and the northern Adriatic coast of Croatia by 1997.

The populations in the Levantine Sea most likely arose from larvae that entered the Mediterranean through the Suez Canal. This is thought to be the earliest example of a Lessepsian migration. The colonisation of the central Mediterranean is probably due to transportation by ships.

== Biology ==
=== Feeding ===
Brachidontes pharaonis is a filter feeder, filtering suspended food from the water, mainly phytoplankton or suspended organic detritus.

=== Reproduction ===
There are two sexes. The sperm and eggs are released into the water column by the adults. There are two larval stages: a trochophore stage which lasts around 24 hours, and a veliger stage which lasts for some weeks before they achieve competence and settle on the substrate.

=== Colony form ===
In warmer, saltier regions it forms dense beds which, exclude other sessile bivalves; but in colder, less saline regions, such as the Aegean Sea, it forms smaller, less densely populated beds.

=== Predators ===
A species of whelk, Stramonita haemastoma, was found to preferentially prey on B. pharaonis off the coast of Israel and in the south of Italy.

== Invasive impact ==
=== Economic ===
Brachidontes pharaonis is regarded as a fouling organism. It has been recorded colonising the hulls of boats in harbours, and may foul intake pipes.

=== Ecological ===
Brachidontes pharaonis can displace the native mussel Mytilaster minimus by interfering with the recruitment of M. minimus. The presence of B. pharaonis also has detrimental effects on the survival and growth of the native mussel. By the late 1990s Israeli surveys were showing that there had been a rapid shift in dominance, demonstrating that some populations of B. pharaonis had reached densities of up to 300 specimens per 100 cm^{2}, while M. minimus was very infrequently encountered. Even higher densities have been reached in the saltpans of western Sicily, where 10,000 specimens per m² have been counted.

== Taxonomy ==
There is some controversy about the species limits of Brachidontes pharaonis and further genetic studies are required. The current thinking is that the name B. pharaonis is best applied to the Mediterranean and Red Sea. Other species within the complex are Brachidontes exustus, Brachidontes semistriatus and Brachidontes variablis, but more study is needed to determine their distributions.
