= Mytilaster solidus =

Scientific classification
- Kingdom: Animalia
- Phylum: Mollusca
- Class: Bivalvia
- Order: Mytilida
- Family: Mytilidae
- Genus: Mytilaster
- Species: M. solidus

Binomial name
- Mytilaster solidus Monterosato, 1883

Species of bivalve

Mytilaster solidus is a small, marine bivalve mollusc belonging to the true mussel family, Mytilidae. First formally described by the Italian malacologist Tommaso Di Maria Allery Monterosato, in 1883, this species populates the shallow coastal environments of Europe and North Africa.
