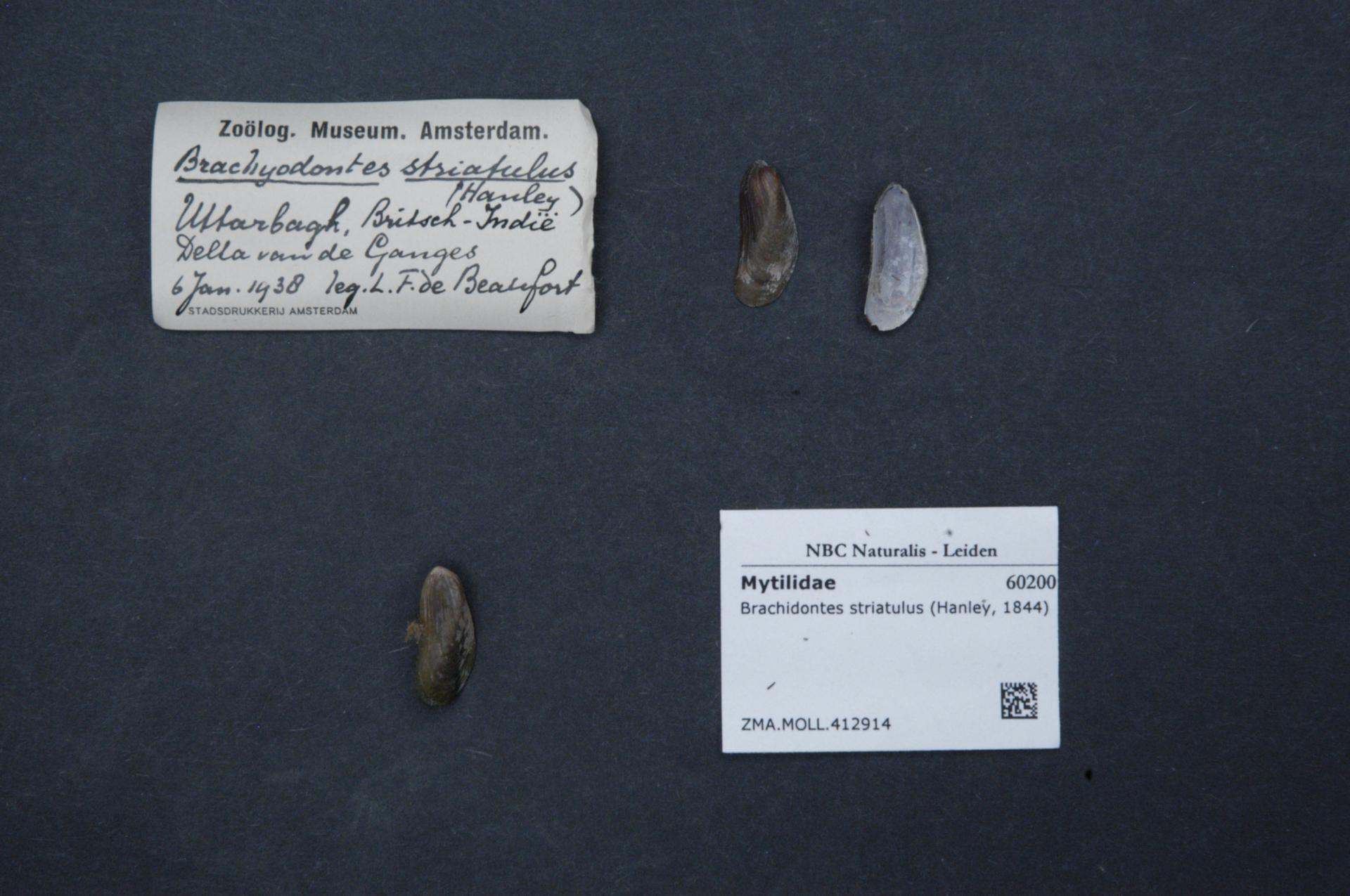

Scientific classification
- Domain: Eukaryota
- Kingdom: Animalia
- Phylum: Mollusca
- Class: Bivalvia
- Order: Mytilida
- Family: Mytilidae
- Genus: Brachidontes; Swainson, 1840

= Brachidontes =

Genus of bivalves

Brachidontes is a genus of mussels in the family Mytilidae.

== Species ==
The following are the species currently included in Brachidontes:

- Brachidontes adamsianus (Dunker, 1857) — Adams mussel
- Brachidontes crebristriatus (Conrad, 1837)
- Brachidontes darwinianus (d'Orbigny, 1842)
- Brachidontes domingensis (Lamarck, 1819) — Santo Domingo mussel
- Brachidontes dunkeri M. Huber, 2015
- Brachidontes erosus (Lamarck, 1819)
- Brachidontes esmeraldensis (Olsson, 1961)
- Brachidontes evansi (E. A. Smith, 1903)
- Brachidontes exustus (Linnaeus, 1758) — scorched mussel
- Brachidontes granoliratus (G. B. Sowerby III, 1909)
- Brachidontes granulatus (Hanley, 1843)
- Brachidontes houstonius Bartsch & Rehder, 1939
- Brachidontes modiolus (Linnaeus, 1767) — yellow mussel
- Brachidontes mutabilis (Gould, 1861) — mutable mussel
- Brachidontes niger (Gmelin, 1791)
- Brachidontes pharaonis (Fischer P., 1870)
- Brachidontes playasensis (Pilsbry & Olsson, 1935)
- Brachidontes puniceus (Gmelin, 1791)
- Brachidontes puntarenensis (Pilsbry & Lowe, 1932)
- Brachidontes rodriguezii (d'Orbigny, 1842)
- Brachidontes rostratus (Dunker, 1857)
- Brachidontes sculptus (Iredale, 1939)
- Brachidontes semilaevis (Menke, 1848)
- Brachidontes setiger (Dunker, 1857)
- Brachidontes striatulus (Hanley, 1843)
- Brachidontes subramosus (Hanley, 1843)
- Brachidontes subsulcatus (Dunker, 1857)
- Brachidontes undulatus (Dunker, 1857)
- Brachidontes ustulatus (Lamarck, 1819)
- Brachidontes variabilis (Krauss, 1848) — variable mussel; synonym: Brachidontes semistriatus
- Brachidontes virgiliae (Barnard, 1964)
- Brachidontes willetsi (Marwick, 1928)
