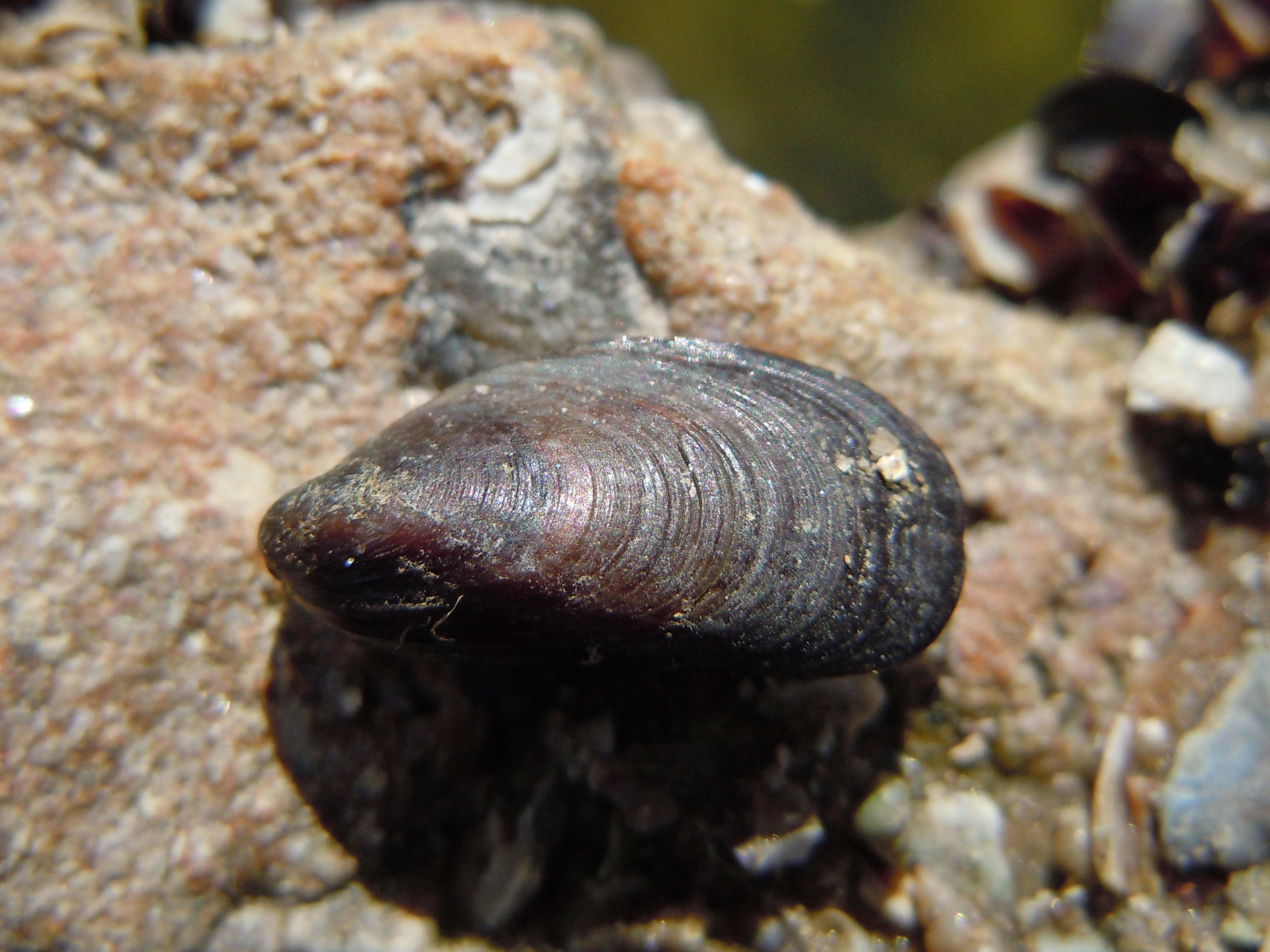
- Mytilaster lineatus

Scientific classification
- Kingdom: Animalia
- Phylum: Mollusca
- Class: Bivalvia
- Order: Mytilida
- Family: Mytilidae
- Genus: Mytilaster; Monterosato, 1884

Type species
- Mytilaster lineatus (Gmelin, 1791)

Synonyms
- Mytilodonta Coen, 1935

= Mytilaster =

Genus of bivalves

Mytilaster is a genus of marine mussels from the warmer waters of the Atlantic Ocean and Mediterranean Basin. The type species is Mytilaster lineatus.

== Species ==
- Mytilaster lineatus (Gmelin, 1791)
- Mytilaster marioni (Locard, 1889)
- Mytilaster minimus (Poli, 1795) — dwarf mussel
- Mytilaster solidus Monterosato, 1884 ex H. Martin ms.
- Mytilaster solisianus (d'Orbigny, 1842)
