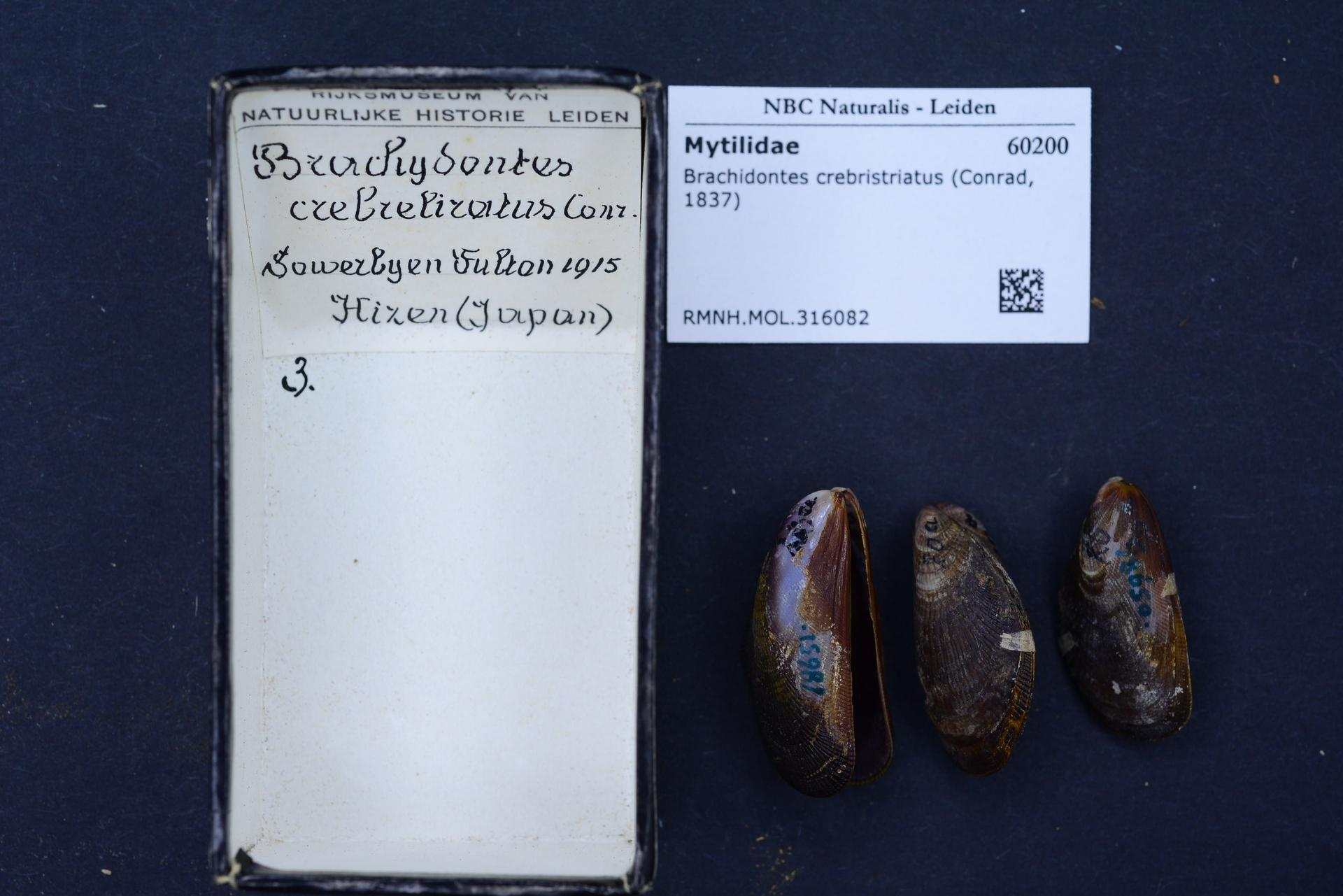

Scientific classification
- Kingdom: Animalia
- Phylum: Mollusca
- Class: Bivalvia
- Order: Mytilida
- Family: Mytilidae
- Genus: Brachidontes
- Species: B. crebristriatus

Binomial name
- Brachidontes crebristriatus (Conrad, 1837)

Synonyms
- Brachidontes maritimus (Pilsbry, 1921); Mytilus crebristriatus Conrad, 1837; Mytilus crebristriatus maritima Pilsbry, 1921

= Brachidontes crebristriatus =

Species of mollusc

Brachidontes crebristriatus, also known as the Hawaiian mussel, nahawele liʻiliʻi or kio-nawahele, is a bivalve known only from Hawaiʻi.

== Description ==
This is a laterally compressed mussel that attaches to substrates by strong byssus threads. This species comes in a dark purple-brown color. They range in different sizes depending how old it gets. The small Hawaiian mussels grow up to 1/4 to 1/2 inches long but the adult mussel grows up to 1 inch or more in brackish waters. The largest Hawaiian mussels are sometimes called mahawele. They are to only eat phytoplankton.

== Distribution & habitat ==
The species occurs in the Hawai'i group in brackish water, on the seashore where there is fresh water or along limestone shorelines, usually at the low tide mark. They are found usually half buried or attached to rocks in clusters or in patches.

== Human use ==
Hawaiian mussels are a popular food item and are consumed both cooked and raw.
