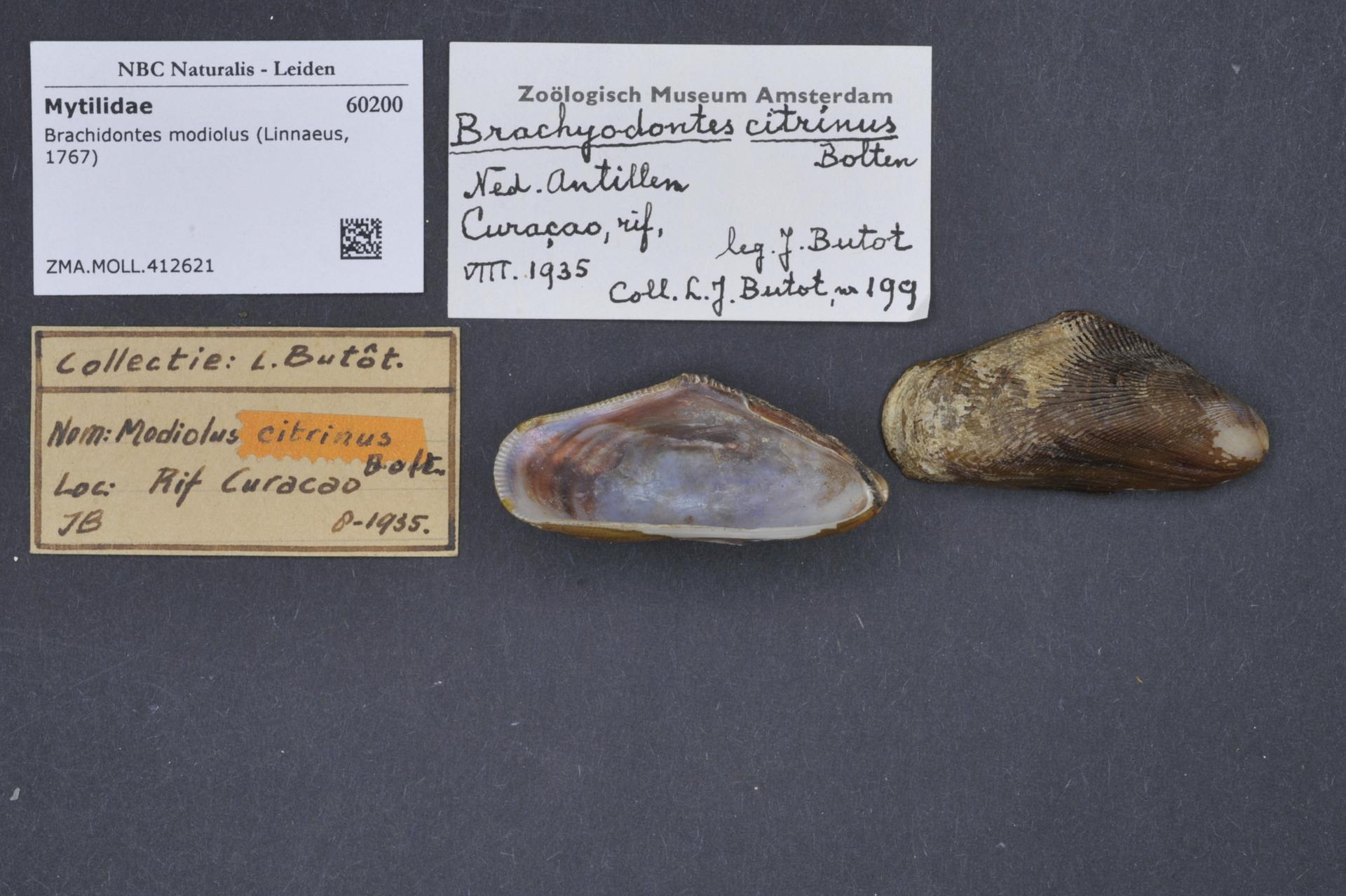

Scientific classification
- Kingdom: Animalia
- Phylum: Mollusca
- Class: Bivalvia
- Order: Mytilida
- Family: Mytilidae
- Genus: Brachidontes
- Species: B. modiolus

Binomial name
- Brachidontes modiolus (Linnaeus, 1767)

= Brachidontes modiolus =

Species of bivalve

Brachidontes modiolus, or the Yellow mussel, is a species of bivalve mollusc in the family Mytilidae. It can be found along the Atlantic coast of North America, ranging from Florida to the West Indies.
