= Rocky shore =

Intertidal area of coast where solid rock predominates

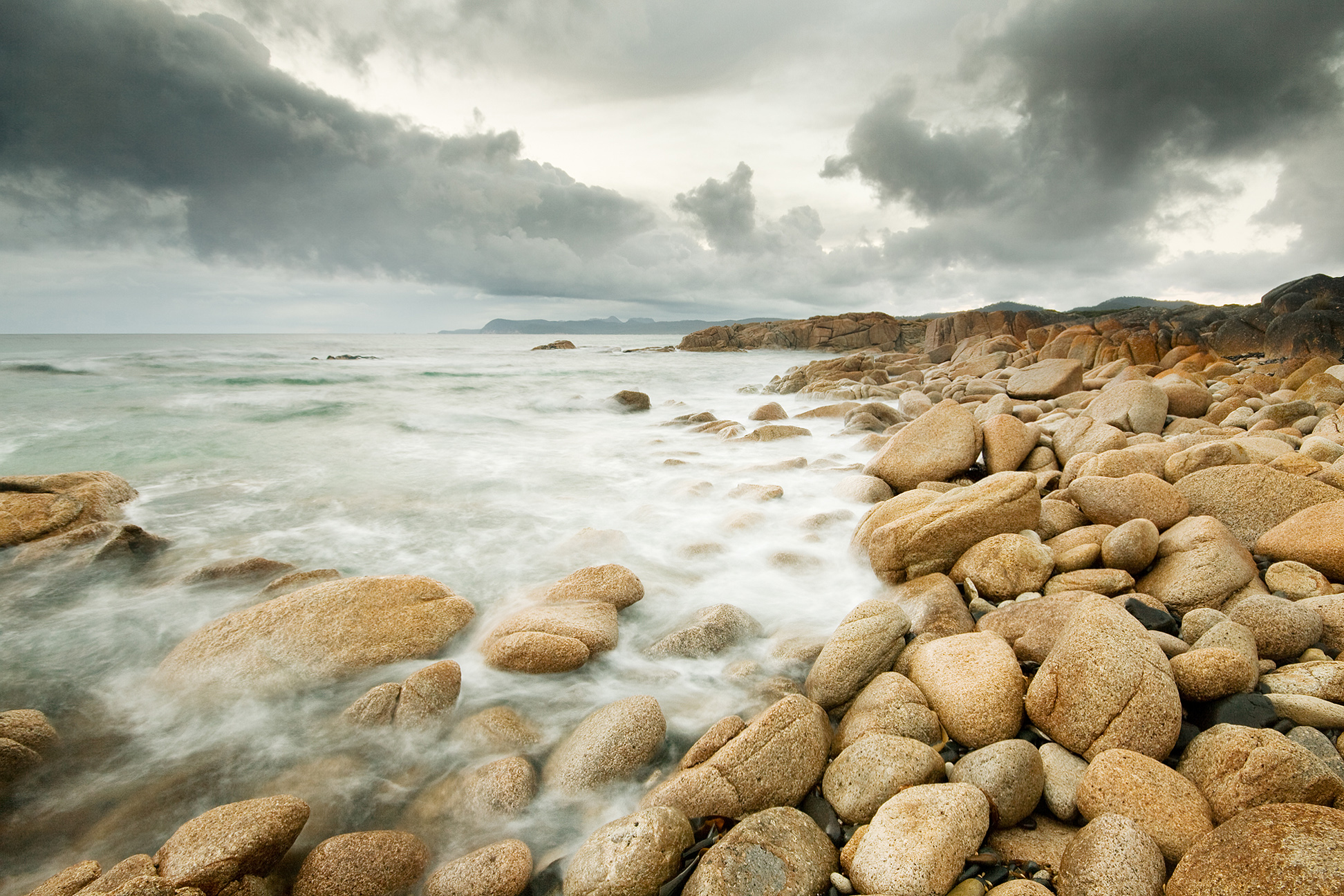
The rise and fall of tides on a rocky shore can define a volatile habitat for marine life

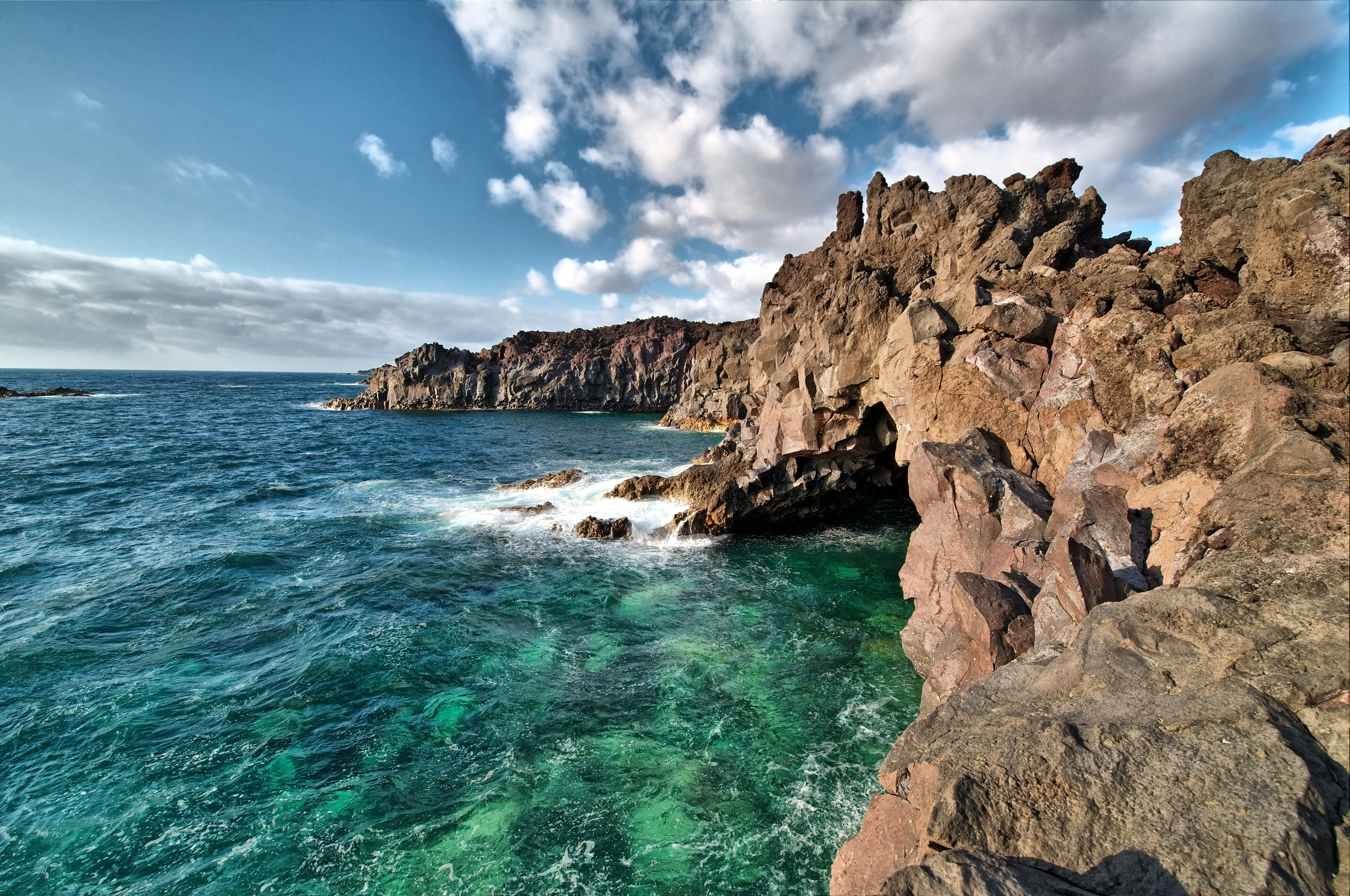
Rocky shore in Lanzarote, Spain

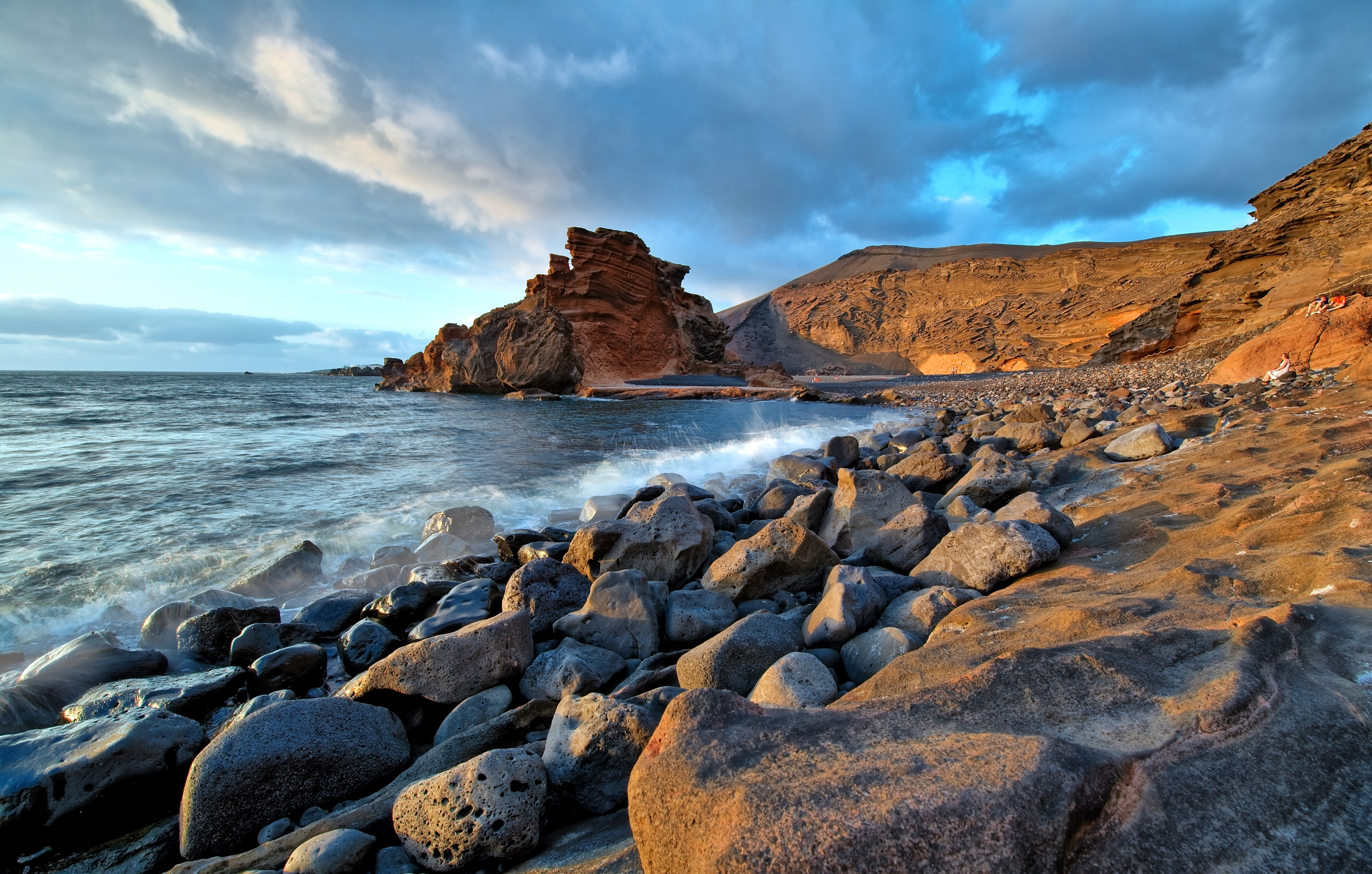
Rocky beach in Canary Islands

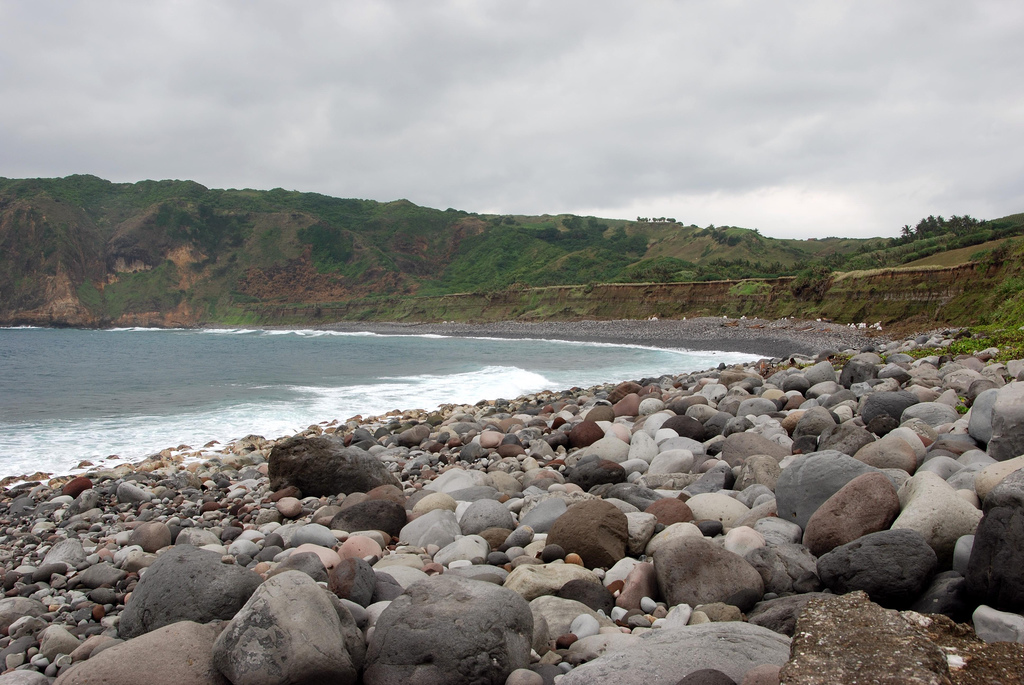
Rocky shore in Batanes, Philippines

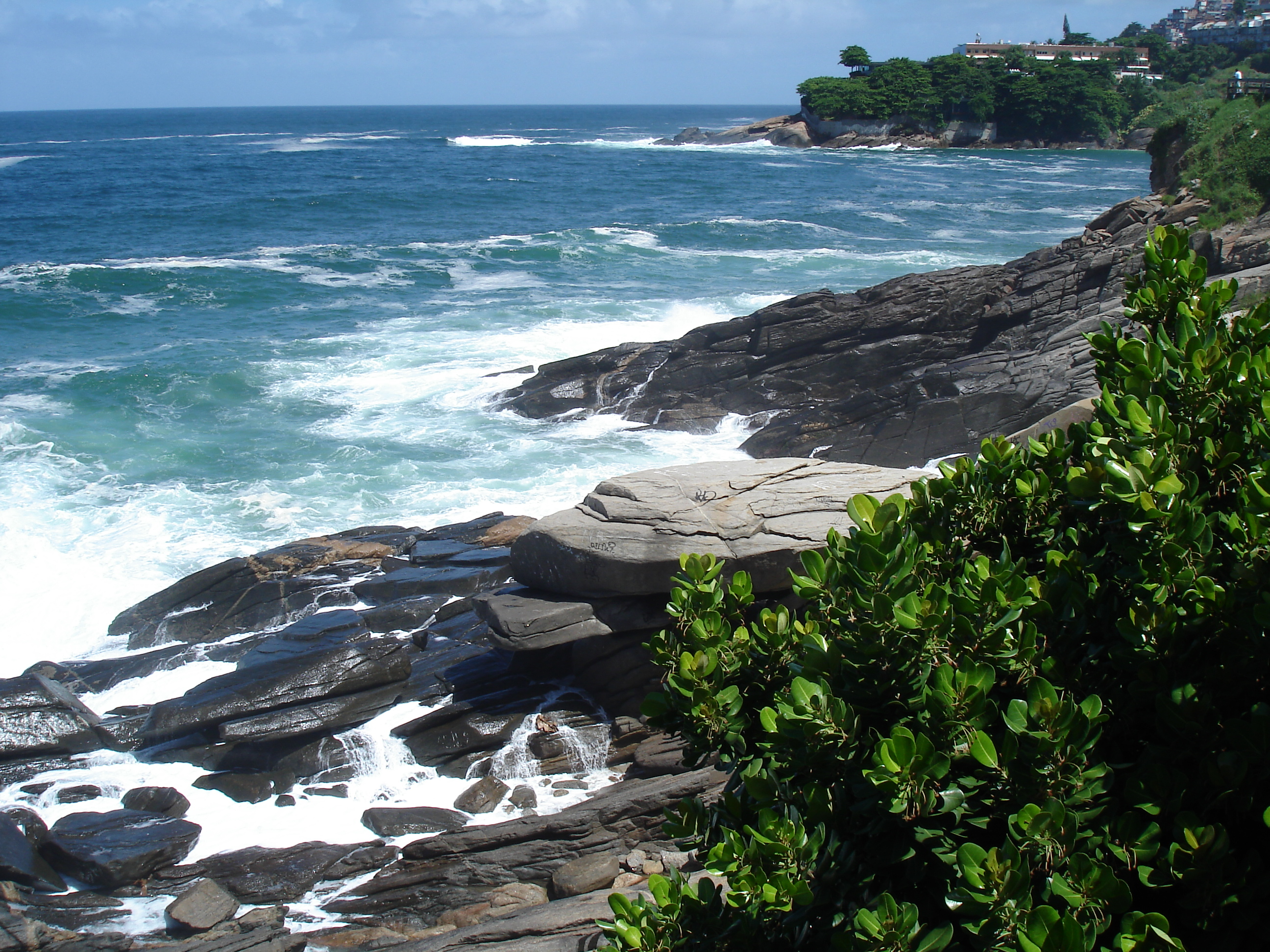
Rocky shore in Leblon, Brazil

A rocky shore is an intertidal area of seacoasts where solid rock predominates. Rocky shores are biologically rich environments, and are a useful "natural laboratory" for studying intertidal ecology and other biological processes. Due to their high accessibility, they have been well studied for a long time and their species are well known.

== Marine life ==
Many factors favour the survival of life on rocky shores. Temperate coastal waters are mixed by waves and convection, maintaining adequate availability of nutrients. Also, the sea brings plankton and broken organic matter in with each tide. The high availability of light (due to low depths) and nutrient levels means that primary productivity of seaweeds and algae can be very high. Human actions can also benefit rocky shores due to nutrient runoff.

Despite these favourable factors, there are also a number of challenges to marine organisms associated with the rocky shore ecosystem. Generally, the distribution of benthic species is limited by salinity, wave exposure, temperature, desiccation and general stress. The constant threat of desiccation during exposure at low tide can result in dehydration. Hence, many species have developed adaptations to prevent this drying out, such as the production of mucous layers and shells. Many species use shells and holdfasts to provide stability against strong wave actions. There are also a variety of other challenges such as temperature fluctuations due to tidal flow (resulting in exposure), changes in salinity and various ranges of illumination. Other threats include predation from birds and other marine organisms, as well as the effects of pollution.

== Ballantine scale ==
The Ballantine scale is a biologically defined scale for measuring the degree of exposure of wave action on a rocky shore. Devised in 1961 by W. J. Ballantine, then at the zoology department of Queen Mary University of London, London, U.K., the scale is based on the observation that where shoreline species are concerned "Different species growing on rocky shores require different degrees of protection from certain aspects of the physical environment, of which wave action is often the most important." The species present in the littoral zone therefore indicate the degree of the shore's exposure. The scale runs from (1), an "extremely exposed" shore, to (8), an "extremely sheltered" shore.

== Zonation ==
Tidal movements of water create zonation patterns along rocky shores from high to low-tide. The area above the high-tide mark is the supralittoral zone which is virtually a terrestrial environment. The area around the high-tide mark is known as the intertidal fringe. Between the high and low-tide marks is the intertidal or littoral zone. Below the low-tide mark is the sublittoral or subtidal zone. The presence and abundance of different animals and algae vary in different zones along the rocky shore due to differing adaptations to the varying levels of exposure to sun and desiccation along the rocky shore.

== Pollution ==
Rocky shores are exposed to many forms of pollution, in particular pollution related to oil spills. Prominent spills are the Torrey Canyon spill, the Amoco Cadiz spill outside the Brittany coast in France and the Exxon Valdez spill in Prince William Sound, Alaska, US. Garbage such as plastics and metals left behind by people is also a problem among many rocky coastlines that attract tourists.

== See also ==
- Intertidal ecology
- Intertidal zone
- Rock pool
- Seashore wildlife
