= Mytilaster solisianus =

Scientific classification
- Kingdom: Animalia
- Phylum: Mollusca
- Class: Bivalvia
- Order: Mytilida
- Family: Mytilidae
- Genus: Mytilaster
- Species: M. solisianus

Binomial name
- Mytilaster solisianus d'Orbigny, 1846

Synonyms
- Brachidontes solisianus d'Orbigny, 1846

Species of bivalve

Mytilaster solisianus is a small species of marine bivalve mollusc in the family Mytilidae. Commonly known as the little Brazilian coastal mussel, it is a dominant ecosystem engineer restricted to the Atlantic coast of South America, primarily spanning the coastal waters of Brazil.
