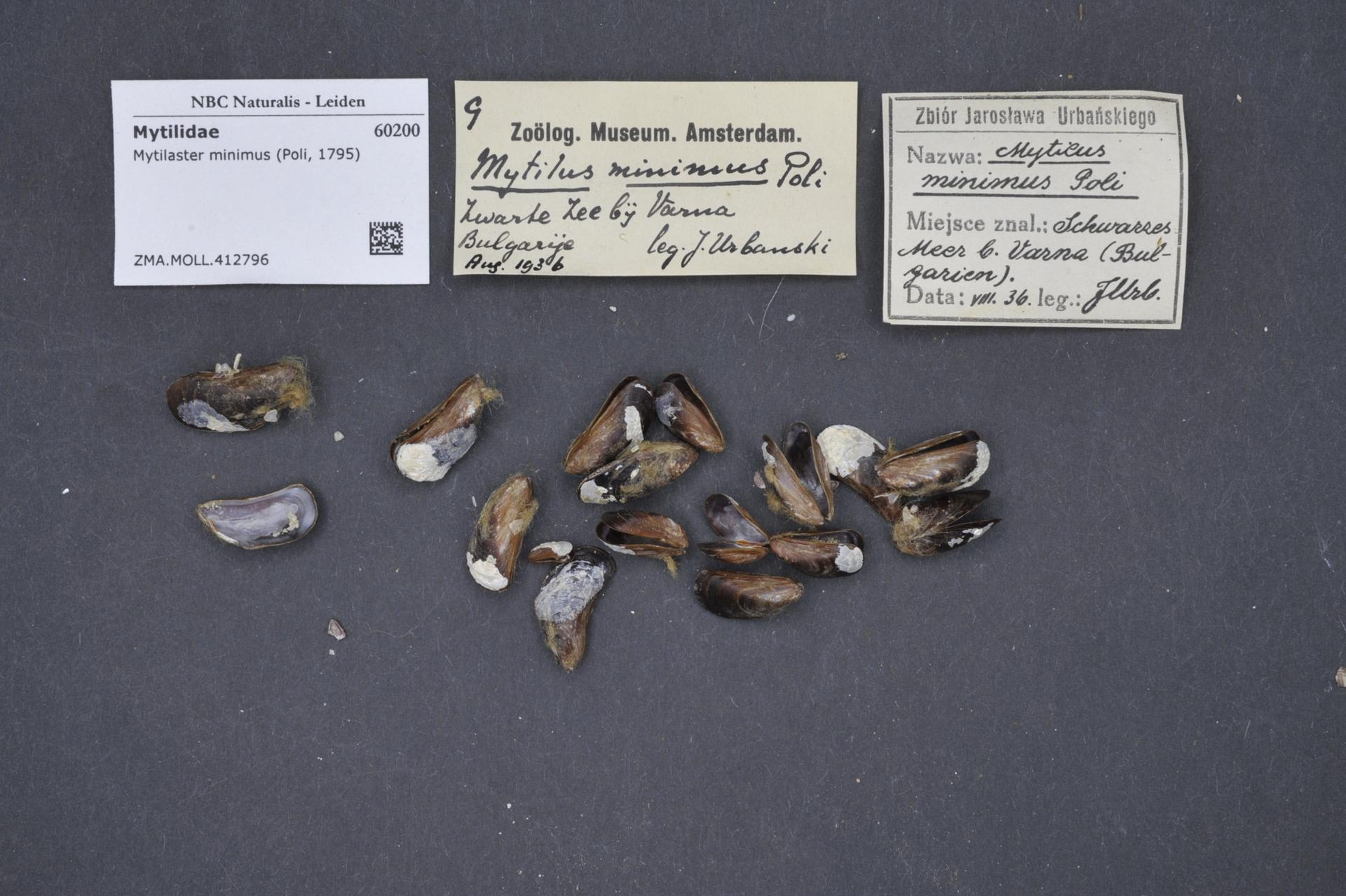
- Museum specimens of shells of Mytilaster minimus

Scientific classification
- Domain: Eukaryota
- Kingdom: Animalia
- Phylum: Mollusca
- Class: Bivalvia
- Order: Mytilida
- Family: Mytilidae
- Genus: Mytilaster
- Species: M. minimus

Binomial name
- Mytilaster minimus (Poli, 1795)

Synonyms
- Mytilus minimus Poli, 1795; Mytilus lacustris O. G. Costa, 1839; Mytilus cylindraceus Requien, 1848; Mytilus liburnicus Brusina, 1870; Mytilus blondeli Monterosato, 1872; Mytilus minutus Locard, 1889

= Mytilaster minimus =

Species of bivalve

Mytilaster minimus, the dwarf mussel or variable mussel, is a species of mussel from sea and brackish waters of the Mediterranean Sea.

== Description ==
The shell of Mytilaster minimus has a smooth and glossy surface which is marked with faint growth rings. The exterior colour of the shell is reddish brown, the inside is pearly. The shell has an elongated shape, with the apex located at one end and a reduced hinge which has no teeth. The length of the shell measures 10-12mm.

== Distribution and biology ==
Mytilaster minimus is distributed throughout the Mediterranean Sea and is also found off Gran Canaria and Tenerife in the Canary Islands It forms colonies on hard substrates in coastal waters and in brackish water such as coastal lagoons. This species can colonise rather oligotrophic areas but in more eutrophic regions the larger Mediterranean edible mussel Mytilus galloprovincialis can be found among and, in places displace M. minimus. The whelk Stramonita haemastoma is an important predator of M. minimus but where the invasive Lesspesian migrant Brachidontes pharaonis is found, the whelk prefers to prey on that species over the native bivalves and barnacles.

== Threats ==
Mytilaster minimus is threatened by the invasive Brachidontes pharaonis which is displacing it in many areas of theMediterranean. The invasive mussel is better able to tolerate higher temperatures and salinities than M. minimus, and in recent years average water temperatures in the Mediterranean have been increasing. B. pharaonis interferes with the recruitment of M. minimus and has a detrimental effect on its survival and growth. In some area of Israel M. minimus is now rarely encountered M. minimus is not tolerant of pollution and this can cause colonies to disappear.
