= Mytilaster marioni =

Scientific classification
- Kingdom: Animalia
- Phylum: Mollusca
- Class: Bivalvia
- Order: Mytilida
- Family: Mytilidae
- Genus: Mytilaster
- Species: M. marioni

Binomial name
- Mytilaster marioni (Locard, 1889)

Species of bivalve

Mytilaster marioni, commonly known as Marion's mussel, is a small species of marine and brackish water mussel belonging to the family Mytilidae. First formally described by French malacologist Arnould Locard in 1889, this bivalve mollusc is native to the warmer waters of the Mediterranean basin.
