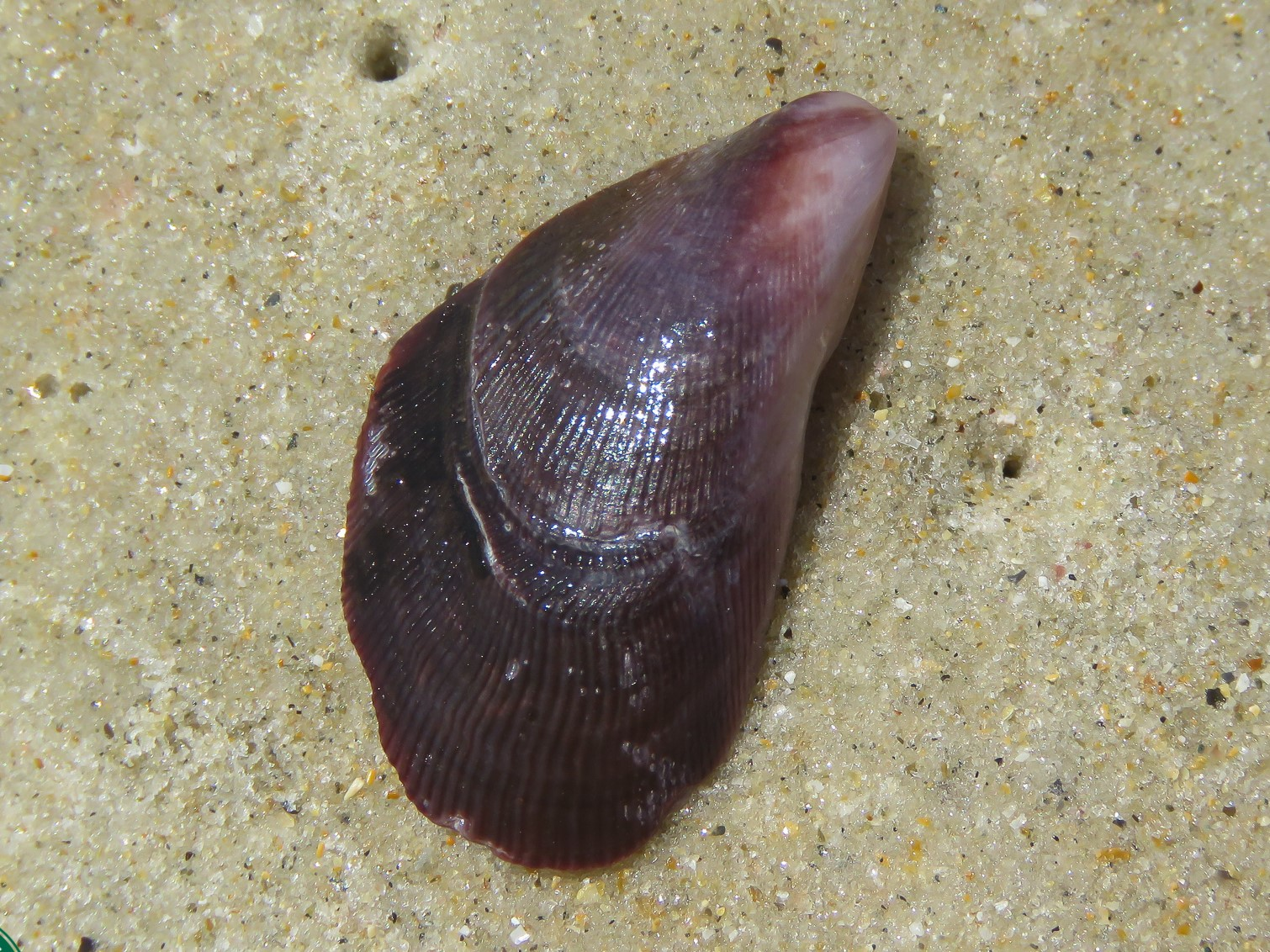

Conservation status
- Secure (NatureServe)

Scientific classification
- Kingdom: Animalia
- Phylum: Mollusca
- Class: Bivalvia
- Order: Mytilida
- Family: Mytilidae
- Genus: Brachidontes
- Species: B. exustus

Binomial name
- Brachidontes exustus (Linnaeus, 1758)

= Brachidontes exustus =

Species of bivalve

Brachidontes exustus, commonly known as the scorched mussel, is a species of bivalve mollusc in the family Mytilidae.

== Description ==
The valves of B. exustus can be dark blackish, yellow, green, or brown with toothed ribs. The anterior end of the valves extends past the umbo and there are up to four teeth at the hinge.

Right and left valve of the same specimen:

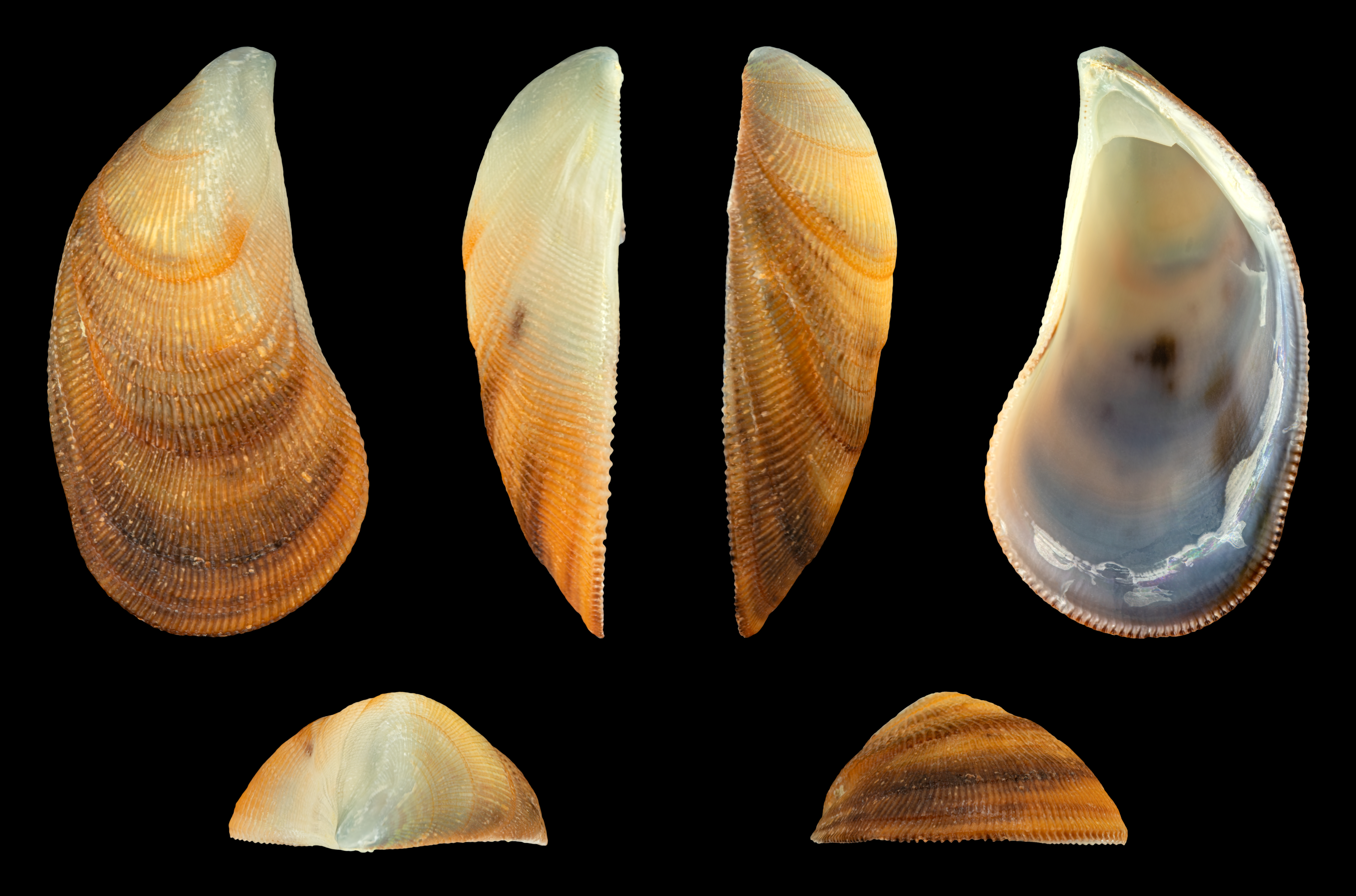
Right valve

Left valve

== Habitat ==
B. exustus can be found along the Atlantic coast of North America, ranging from Cape Hatteras to the West Indies and Brazil. They are an intertidal species that attaches to hard surfaces using strong thread-like proteinaceous structures called byssal threads. They often form clusters as the lowest intertidal zone.
