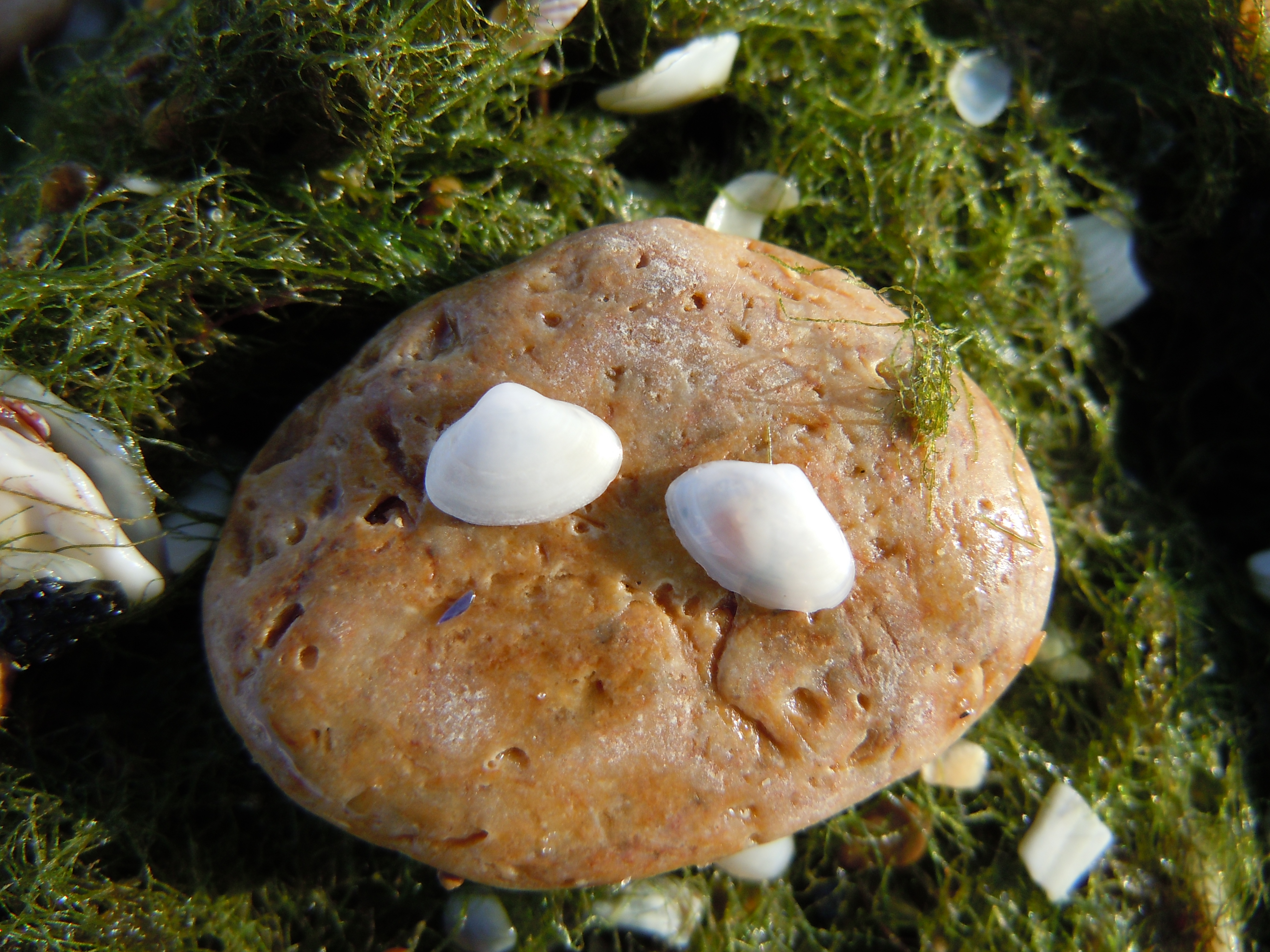

Scientific classification
- Kingdom: Animalia
- Phylum: Mollusca
- Class: Bivalvia
- Order: Myida
- Family: Corbulidae
- Genus: Lentidium
- Species: L. mediterraneum

Binomial name
- Lentidium mediterraneum (O. G. Costa, 1830)

= Lentidium mediterraneum =

Species of clam

Lentidium mediterraneum is a species of clam in the family Corbulidae.
