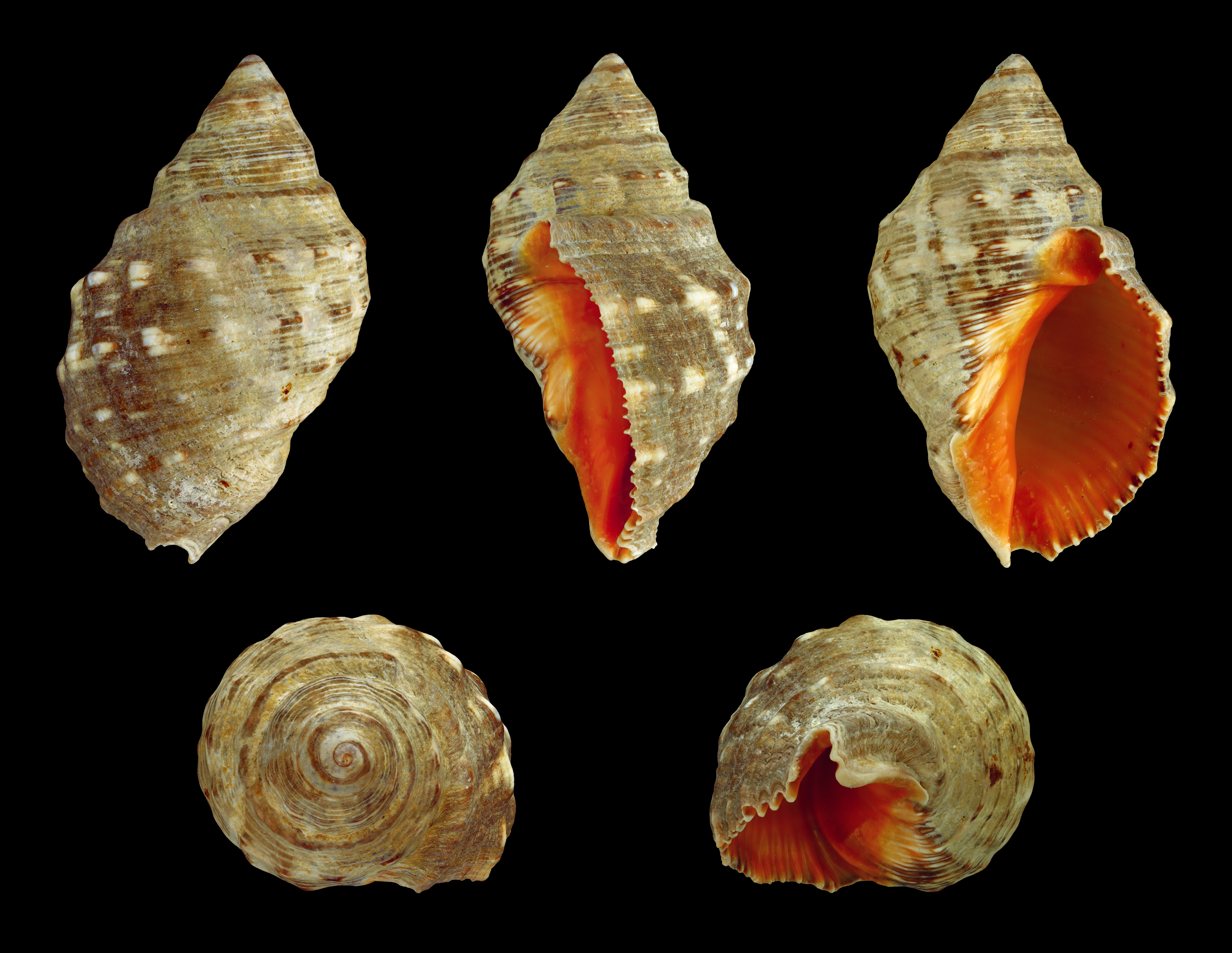
- Stramonita haemastoma shell

Scientific classification
- Kingdom: Animalia
- Phylum: Mollusca
- Class: Gastropoda
- Subclass: Caenogastropoda
- Order: Neogastropoda
- Family: Muricidae
- Genus: Stramonita
- Species: S. haemastoma

Binomial name
- Stramonita haemastoma (Linnaeus, 1767)

Synonyms
- Buccinum cingulatum Lamarck, 1816; Buccinum haemastoma Linnaeus, 1767 (basionym); Haustrum striatum Perry, 1811; Murex consul Gmelin, 1791; Purpura barcinonensis Hidalgo, 1867; Purpura fasciata Dunker, 1857; Purpura forbesi Dunker, 1853; Purpura gigantea Calcara, 1840; Purpura gigantea Reeve, 1846; Purpura haemastoma (Linnaeus, 1767); Purpura haemastoma acuminata Settepassi, 1977; Purpura haemastoma bulbosa Settepassi, 1977; Purpura haemastoma elongata Settepassi, 1977; Purpura haemastoma var. calva Weinkauff, 1873; Purpura haemastoma var. cornuta Philippi, 1844; Purpura haemastoma var. costellata Pallary, 1900; Purpura haemastoma var. gracilior Kobelt, 1887; Purpura haemastoma var. minima Pallary, 1900; Purpura haemastoma var. minor Bucquoy, Dautzenberg & Dollfuss, 1882; Purpura haemastoma var. nodulosa Bucquoy, Dautzenberg & Dollfuss, 1882; Purpura haemastoma var. striata Pallary, 1900; Purpura laevis Monterosato, 1878; Purpura lineata Kiener, 1835; Purpura macrostoma Küster, 1860; Purpura nebulosa Conrad, 1867; Purpura nuttalli Conrad, 1837; Purpura oceanica Locard, 1886; Purpura unifascialis Lamarck, 1816; Purpura viduata Küster, 1859; Thais grisea Röding, 1798; Thais haemastoma Linnaeus; Thais metallica Röding, 1798; Thais stellata Röding, 1798 (nomen dubium)

= Stramonita haemastoma =

Species of gastropod

Stramonita haemastoma, common name the red-mouthed rock shell or the Florida dog winkle, is a species of predatory sea snail, a marine gastropod mollusc in the family Muricidae, the rock snails.

== Subspecies ==
Stramonita haemastoma contains the following subspecies:

- Stramonita haemastoma canaliculata (Gray, 1839): synonym of Stramonita canaliculata (Gray, 1839)
- Stramonita haemastoma floridana (Conrad, 1837): synonym of Stramonita floridana (Conrad, 1837) (unaccepted rank)
- Stramonita haemastoma haemastoma (Linnaeus, 1767): synonym of Stramonita haemastoma (Linnaeus, 1767)

== Distribution ==
The red-mouthed rock shell occurs widely in tropical and warm water areas of the Western Atlantic Ocean. Regions where it can be found include the Caribbean Sea, North Carolina and Florida, Bermuda and the entire Brazilian coast, including the islands of Abrolhos and Fernando de Noronha. It is also found in the Eastern Atlantic: tropical Western Africa and Southwestern Africa, including Cape Verde and Angola, and in European waters, including Macaronesian Islands, the Mediterranean Sea and the southwest coast of Apulia. Its once abundant population in the Eastern Mediterranean collapsed early in the 21st century and had entirely disappeared by 2016.

== Description ==
The adult shell size for this species varies between 22 mm and 120 mm.

== Feeding habits ==
Stramonita haemastoma is a widespread gastropod that consumes bivalves, barnacles and limpets. In the Mediterranean Sea the whelk is an important predator of the bivalve Mytilaster minimus, but where the invasive Lessepsian migrant bivalve Brachidontes pharaonis is found, the whelk prefers to prey on that species over the native bivalves and barnacles. Through feeding behaviors such as attacking the margin or lip of shells where defenses are weakest, Stramonita haemastoma insert its proboscid between the valves injecting proteolytic enzymes and a toxin that causes bivalves to gape.

== Human use ==
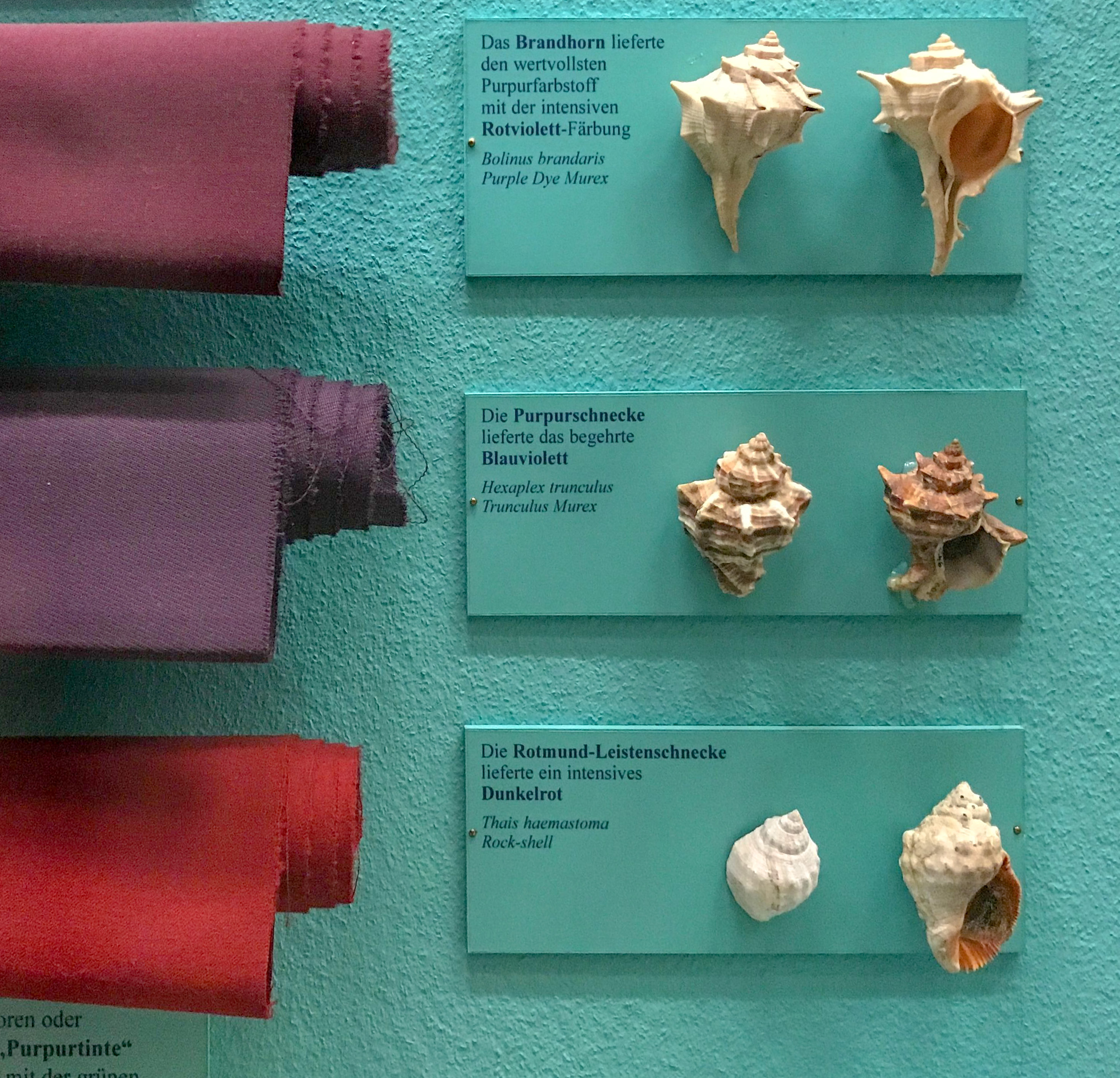
purple dyed fabric

The shell was one of two principal sources of Tyrian purple, a highly prized dye used in classical times for the clothing of royalty, as recorded by Aristotle and Pliny the Elder.
