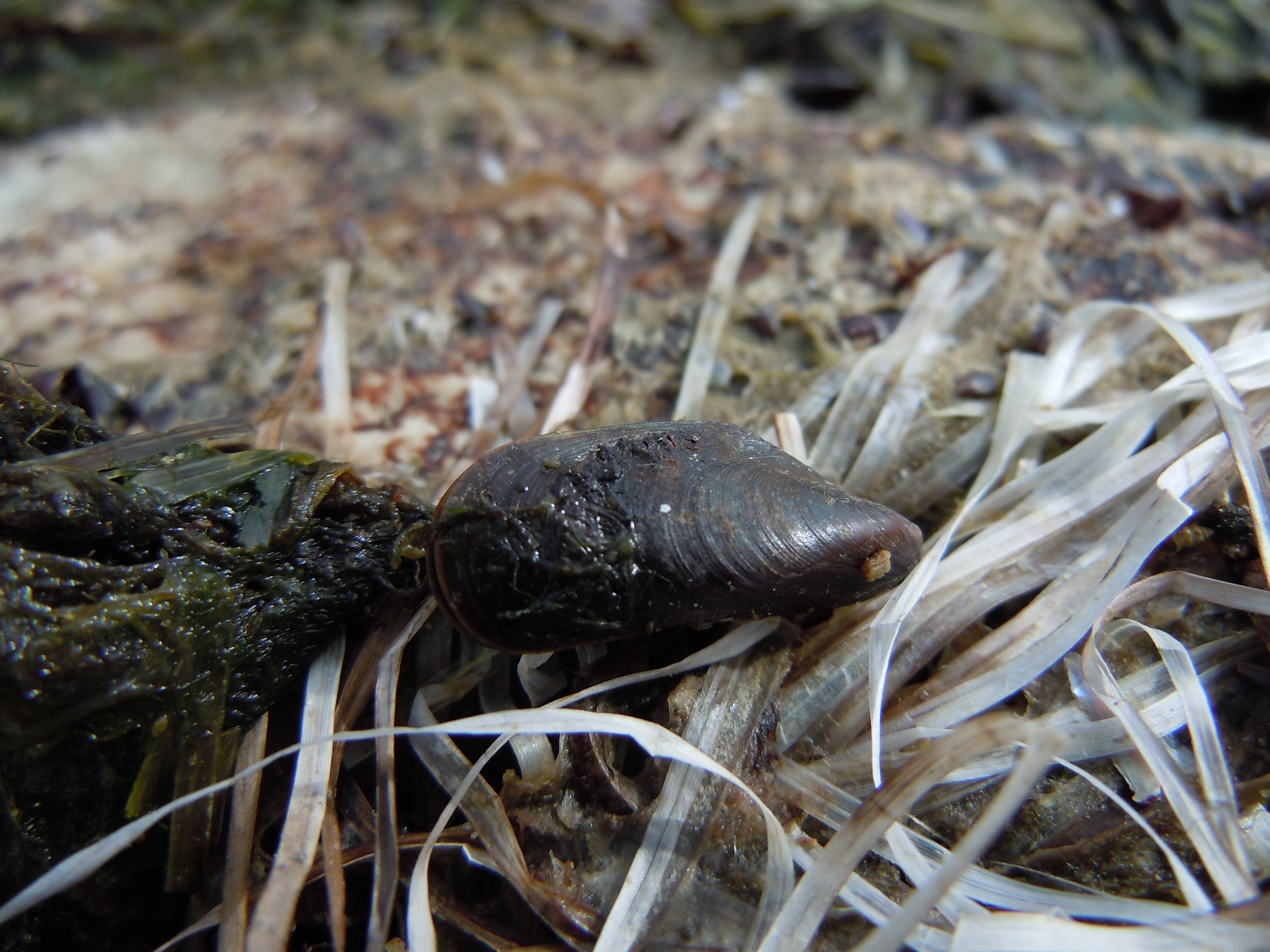

Scientific classification
- Domain: Eukaryota
- Kingdom: Animalia
- Phylum: Mollusca
- Class: Bivalvia
- Order: Mytilida
- Family: Mytilidae
- Genus: Mytilaster
- Species: M. lineatus

Binomial name
- Mytilaster lineatus (Gmelin, 1791)

Synonyms
- Mytilus baldi Brusina, 1865; Mytilus confusus Dillwyn, 1817; Mytilus crispus Cantraine, 1835; Mytilus lamarckii Bucquoy, Dautzenberg & Dollfus, 1890; Mytilus lineatus Gmelin, 1791; Mytilus lineatus var. minorsolida Monterosato, 1875; Mytilus minimus var. squalidermis Danilo & Sandri, 1856; Mytilus scaber Krynicki, 1837

= Mytilaster lineatus =

Species of bivalve

Mytilaster lineatus is a species of marine mussel, distributed in European waters. It is common in Greece, Russia and Ukraine (Mediterranean and Black Seas). It is referred as an introduced species in the Caspian Sea.
