= List of deep water fish of the Red Sea =

Deep-water fish of the Red Sea include bathydemersal, bathypelagic, and benthopelagic species, listed below.

== Bathydemersal species ==
Red Sea bathydemersal species include:

- Acropoma japonicum , Glowbelly, Acropomatidae
- Ariosoma mauritianum , Blunt-tooth conger, Congridae
- Arnoglossus marisrubri , Bothidae
- Bembrops caudimacula , Percophidae
- Champsodon omanensis , Champsodontidae
- Cynoglossus acutirostris , Sharpnose tonguesole, Cynoglossidae
- Dysomma fuscoventralis , Synaphobranchidae
- Facciolella karreri , Nettastomatidae
- Grammonus robustus , Bythitidae
- Harpadon erythraeus , Synodontidae
- Heptranchias perlo , Sharpnose sevengill shark, Hexanchidae
- Hippocampus kelloggi , Great seahorse, Syngnathidae
- Iago omanensis , Bigeye houndshark, Triakidae
- Mustelus manazo , Starspotted smooth-hound, Triakidae
- Neobythites stefanovi , Ophidiidae
- Neocentropogon mesedai , Tetrarogidae
- Neomerinthe bathyperimensis , Scorpaenidae
- Obliquogobius turkayi , Gobiidae
- Parascolopsis baranesi , Nemipteridae
- Physiculus marisrubri , Moridae
- Priolepis goldshmidtae , Gobiidae
- Rhynchoconger trewavasae , Congridae
- Saurenchelys meteori , Nettastomatidae
- Setarches guentheri , Deepwater scorpionfish, Setarchidae
- Synagrops philippinensis , Acropomatidae
- Trichiurus auriga , Pearly hairtail, Trichiuridae
- Upeneus davidaromi , Mullidae
- Uranoscopus marisrubri , Uranoscopidae
- Uroconger erythraeus , Congridae

== Bathypelagic species ==
Red Sea bathypelagic species include:

- Astronesthes martensii , Stomiidae
- Atrobucca geniae , Sciaenidae
- Benthosema pterotum , Skinnycheek lanternfish, Myctophidae
- Champsodon capensis , Gaper, Champsodontidae
- Chauliodus sloani , Sloane's viperfish, Stomiidae
- Diaphus coeruleus , Blue lantern fish, Myctophidae
- Lestrolepis luetkeni , Naked barracuda, Paralepididae
- Maurolicus mucronatus , Sternoptychidae
- Nemichthys scolopaceus , Slender snipe eel, Nemichthyidae
- Stomias affinis , Gnther's boafish, Stomiidae

== Benthopelagic species ==
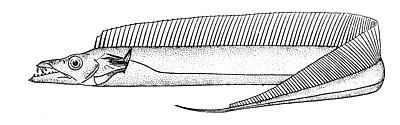
Trichiurus lepturus

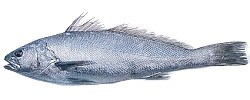
Argyrosomus regius

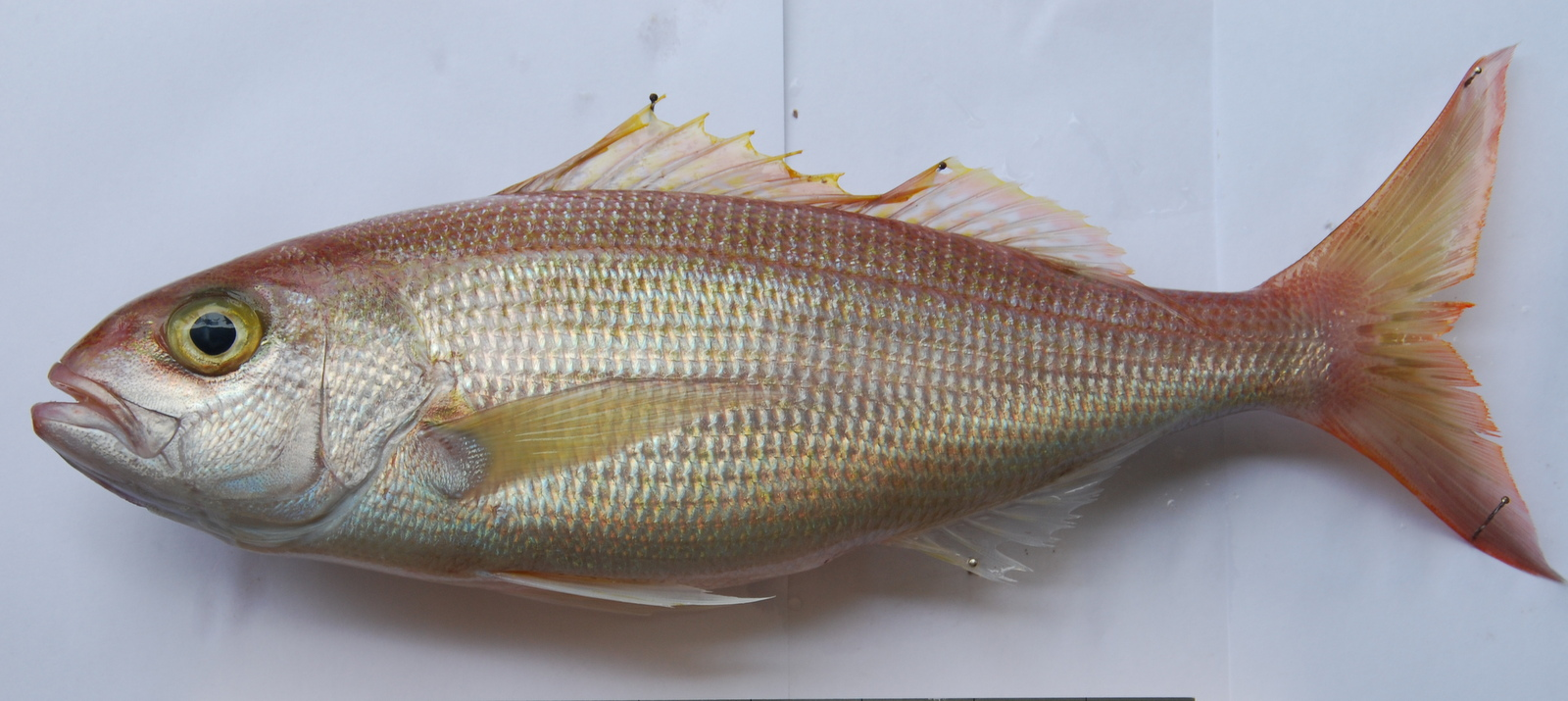
Pristipomoides filamentosus

Red Sea benthopelagic species include:

- Aetobatus flagellum , Longheaded eagle ray, Myliobatidae
- Aetobatus ocellatus , Myliobatidae
- Anoxypristis cuspidata , Knifetooth sawfish, Pristidae
- Apogon queketti , Spotfin cardinal, Apogonidae
- Argyrosomus regius , Meagre, Sciaenidae
- Ariomma brevimanus , Ariommatidae
- Ateleopus natalensis , Ateleopodidae
- Bryx analicarens , Pink pipefish, Syngnathidae
- Canthidermis macrolepis , Large-scale triggerfish, Balistidae
- Chanos chanos , Milkfish, Chanidae
- Decapterus russelli , Indian scad, Carangidae
- Gerres methueni , Striped silver biddy, Gerreidae
- Glossogobius giuris , Tank goby, Gobiidae
- Hoplostethus mediterraneus mediterraneus , Mediterranean slimehead, Trachichthyidae
- Lobotes surinamensis , Atlantic tripletail, Lobotidae
- Megalops cyprinoides , Indo-Pacific tarpon, Megalopidae
- Mugil cephalus, Flathead mullet, Mugilidae
- Physiculus sudanensis , Moridae
- Pomadasys striatus , Striped grunter, Haemulidae
- Pristipomoides filamentosus , Crimson jobfish, Lutjanidae
- Pristipomoides sieboldii , Lavender jobfish, Lutjanidae
- Rhinobatos halavi , Halavi's guitarfish, Rhinobatidae
- Rhinobatos punctifer , Spotted guitarfish, Rhinobatidae
- Rhinobatos thouin , Clubnose guitarfish, Rhinobatidae
- Rhizoprionodon acutus , Milk shark, Carcharhinidae
- Seriola lalandi , Yellowtail amberjack, Carangidae
- Stalix histrio , Opistognathidae
- Stromateus fiatola , Blue butterfish, Stromateidae
- Synodus randalli , Synodontidae
- Taractichthys steindachneri , Sickle pomfret, Bramidae
- Tentoriceps cristatus , Crested hairtail, Trichiuridae
- Terapon puta , Small-scaled terapon, Terapontidae
- Thyrsitoides marleyi , Black snoek, Gempylidae
- Trichiurus lepturus, Largehead hairtail, Trichiuridae
