= Megaquarium =

2018 video game

- Developer: Twice Circled
- Publisher: Twice Circled
- Engine: Unity
- Platform: Microsoft Windows: macOS; Linux; Nintendo Switch; Xbox One; PlayStation 4
- Release: WW: September 13, 2018 (PC); WW: October 18, 2019 (consoles)
- Genre: Business simulation
- Mode: Single-player

Megaquarium is a business simulation game developed and published in 2018 by Twice Circled.

== Gameplay ==
Players manage an aquarium. Based on in-game information, players must determine which kinds of fish can be put in the same tank. For example, predatory fish must be separated from their prey. Players also manage technical issues, such as water filtration systems. Staff, hired by the player, maintain the aquarium. Staff can not be controlled directly, but they can be given instructions, which they carry out on their own. Customers must be kept happy, such as by providing them with refreshment, and they do not like seeing filters or other machinery, necessitating hiding it out of view but within a workable distance of the tanks. Gameplay supports both campaigns, which act as a tutorial, and a sandbox mode. When zooming in closely, players can experience their aquarium like the customers.

== Development ==
Megaquarium was released for the PC on September 13, 2018. It was released on Xbox One, PlayStation 4, and Switch on October 18, 2019.

The Freshwater Frenzy DLC was released for PCs on June 4, 2020 introducing freshwater to the game with 30 new species, including reptiles and the American manatee, alongside new campaign levels as well as breeding mechanics for "hybrid" fish color morphs. Due to technical issues, the release of the DLC was delayed on consoles until March 2022.

Architect's Collection, a second DLC, was released for the PC on November 11, 2021, and included 15 fan-requested new species, buildable arches, bridges, and tunnels, and made more assets paintable.

A third pack, Deep Freeze, was billed as a deluxe expansion and released on October 18, 2023 for PC. It introduced abyssal creatures, like the goblin shark and pacific viperfish, and animals from the polar regions, such as the Arctic char, polar bear, and emperor penguin, to the game. The expansion pack contains 30 new species, eight new tanks, items to care for the needs of the new animals, and new campaign levels.

== Reception ==
Reception

Aggregate score
Aggregator	Score		
Aggregator	NS	PC	PS4
Metacritic	70/100	69/100	78/100

Review scores
Publication	Score		
Publication	NS	PC	PS4
GameRevolution			7/10
PC Gamer (US)		86/100	
Push Square			7/10

Fraser Brown of Rock Paper Shotgun wrote, "It's a breezy, upbeat management game that nonetheless gives you lots to play with and plenty of room for experimentation." The site later included it in their list of best simulation games for the PC. Though she said some of the mechanics are a little opaque, Philippa Warr called it a "simple but fun" game. Bit-Tech called it "a neatly assembled management sim" whose minor annoyances did not stop reviewer Rick Lane from recommending it. Reviewing the PlayStation 4 port for GameRevolution, Tyler TReese called it a "simplified tycoon sim with a lot of heart" that "delivers what was promised even if it doesn't exceed those promises". Sammy Barker of Push Square wrote that "the gameplay may seem shallow at first blush, but plunge a little deeper and you’ll find plenty of depth".
