= Chauliodus schmidti =

Conservation status
- Least Concern (IUCN 3.1)

Scientific classification
- Kingdom: Animalia
- Phylum: Chordata
- Class: Actinopterygii
- Order: Stomiiformes
- Family: Stomiidae
- Genus: Chauliodus
- Species: C. schmidti

Binomial name
- Chauliodus schmidti Ege, 1948

Species of fish

Chauliodus schmidti is a species of viperfish in the family Stomiidae. The species is rarely-seen, but has been documented off of the West African coast. Fully-grown members of the species can reach a maximum length of ~23 centimeters.
