= Benthosema suborbitale =

Scientific classification
- Domain: Eukaryota
- Kingdom: Animalia
- Phylum: Chordata
- Class: Actinopterygii
- Order: Myctophiformes
- Family: Myctophidae
- Genus: Benthosema
- Species: B. suborbitale

Binomial name
- Benthosema suborbitale (Gilbert, 1913)

Species of fish

Benthosema suborbitale is a species of fish in the family Myctophidae.
