= Benthosema panamense =

Scientific classification
- Kingdom: Animalia
- Phylum: Chordata
- Class: Actinopterygii
- Order: Myctophiformes
- Family: Myctophidae
- Genus: Benthosema
- Species: B. panamense

Binomial name
- Benthosema panamense (Tåning, 1932)

Species of fish

Benthosema panamense is a species of marine fish in the family Myctophidae.
