= Chauliodus minimus =

Conservation status
- Least Concern (IUCN 3.1)

Scientific classification
- Kingdom: Animalia
- Phylum: Chordata
- Class: Actinopterygii
- Order: Stomiiformes
- Family: Stomiidae
- Genus: Chauliodus
- Species: C. minimus

Binomial name
- Chauliodus minimus Parin & Novikova, 1974

Species of fish

Chauliodus minimus is a species of viperfish in the family Stomiidae. It is known to be the only species of viperfish with a chin barbel. It has been found at depths as shallow as 300m. The species has been documented in the Atlantic Ocean, and full-grown members of the species can reach a maximum length of ~14.5 centimeters.
