= Chauliodus barbatus =

Conservation status
- Least Concern (IUCN 3.1)

Scientific classification
- Kingdom: Animalia
- Phylum: Chordata
- Class: Actinopterygii
- Order: Stomiiformes
- Family: Stomiidae
- Genus: Chauliodus
- Species: C. barbatus

Binomial name
- Chauliodus barbatus Garman, 1899

Species of fish

Chauliodus barbatus is a species of deep-sea viperfish in the family Stomiidae. The species has been documented in the Pacific Ocean off the coast of Chile, and when full-grown, members of the species can reach a maximum length of ~19.8 centimeters.
