= Benthosema fibulatum =

Conservation status
- Least Concern (IUCN 3.1)

Scientific classification
- Kingdom: Animalia
- Phylum: Chordata
- Class: Actinopterygii
- Order: Myctophiformes
- Family: Myctophidae
- Genus: Benthosema
- Species: B. fibulatum

Binomial name
- Benthosema fibulatum (Gilbert & Cramer, 1897)

Species of fish

Benthosema fibulatum is a species of fish in the family Myctophidae. It is a meso- to bathypelagic species found in the Indian and Pacific Oceans. It grows to 10 cm (3.9 in) total length.
