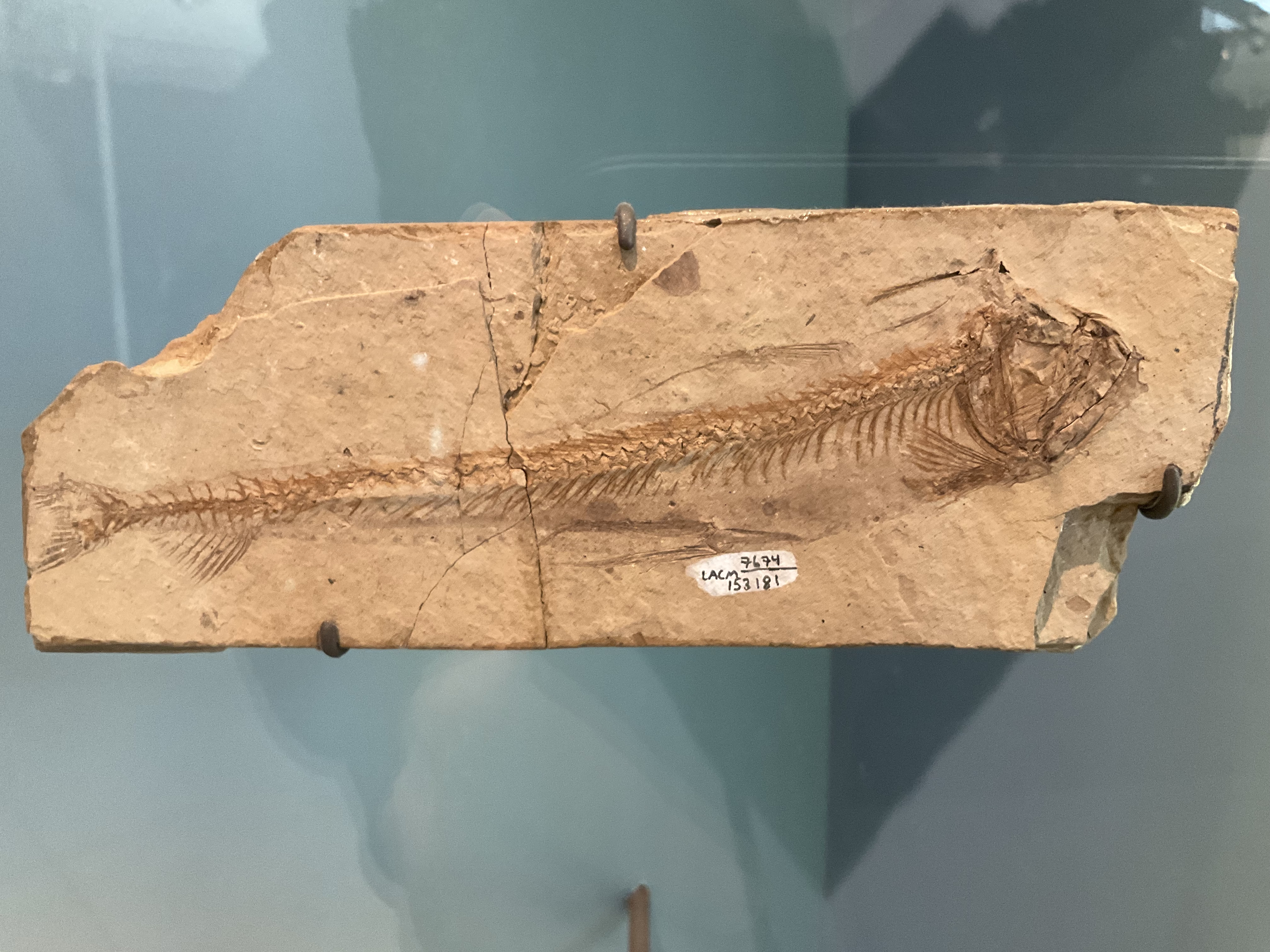
- LACM 7674/153181

Scientific classification
- Kingdom: Animalia
- Phylum: Chordata
- Class: Actinopterygii
- Order: Stomiiformes
- Family: Stomiidae
- Genus: Chauliodus
- Species: †C. eximius

Binomial name
- †Chauliodus eximius (Jordan, 1925)

Synonyms
- Eostomias eximus Jordan, 1925

= Chauliodus eximius =

Chauliodus eximius Temporal range: Late Miocene

Extinct species of fish

Chauliodus eximius, originally described in 1925 as Eostomias eximius, is an extinct species of viperfish in the family Stomiidae, known from marine Late Miocene (Tortonian)-aged strata of Southern California. It inhabited deepwater habitats, as with modern viperfish, and is known from the Monterey, Modelo, and Puente Formations, all of which were originally deposited in an abyssal environment before being brought to the surface by tectonic activity.

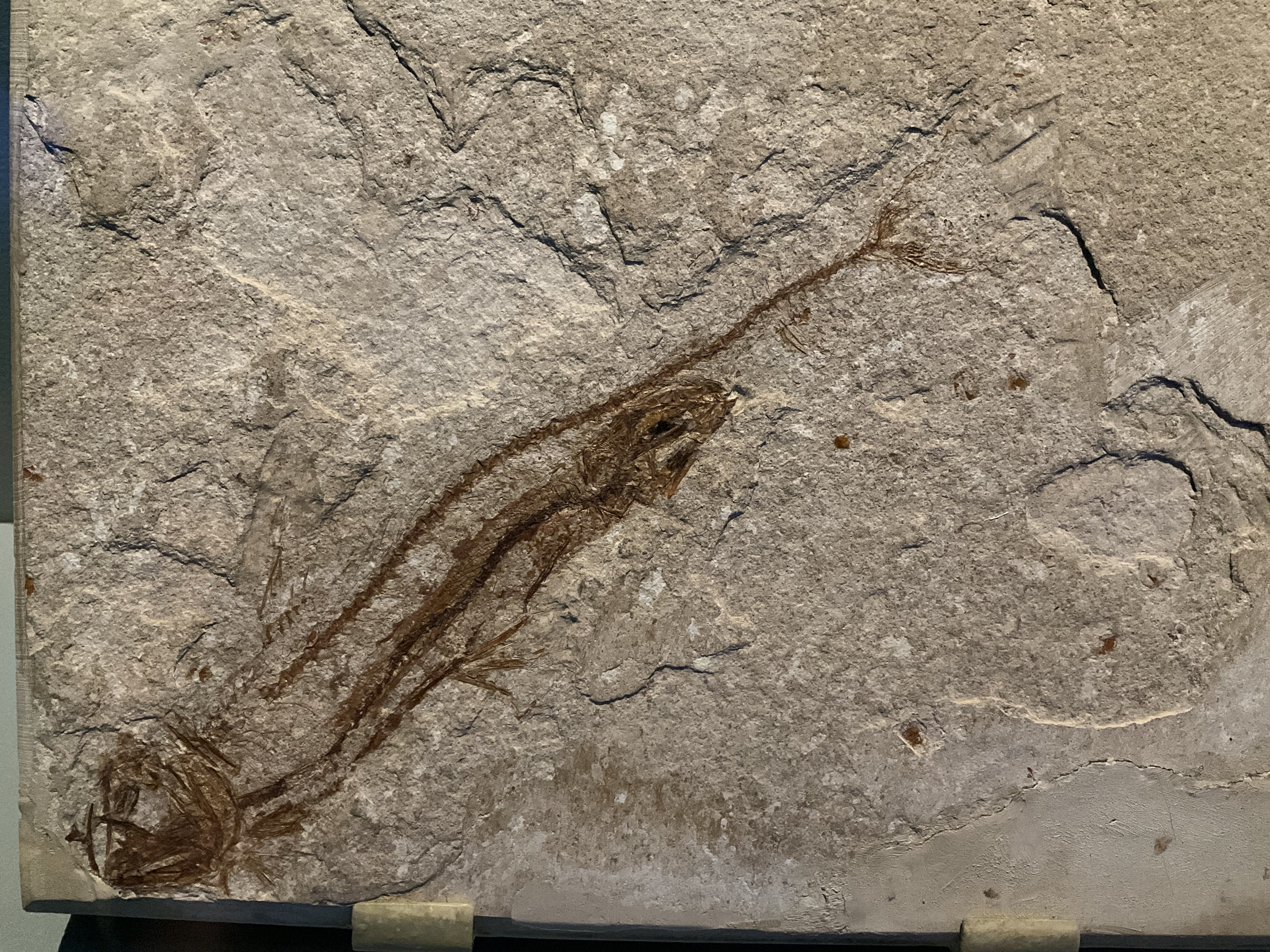
With swallowed prey

== See also ==
- Viperfish
