= Chauliodus vasnetzovi =

Scientific classification
- Kingdom: Animalia
- Phylum: Chordata
- Class: Actinopterygii
- Order: Stomiiformes
- Family: Stomiidae
- Genus: Chauliodus
- Species: C. vasnetzovi

Binomial name
- Chauliodus vasnetzovi Novikova, 1972

Species of fish

Chauliodus vasnetzovi is a species of viperfish in the family Stomiidae, first discovered in 1972. It is generally found in the Bathypelagic zone in the Southeast Pacific near Chile and can grow to be up to 32.5 centimetres (12.8 in) long.

== See also ==
- Viperfish
