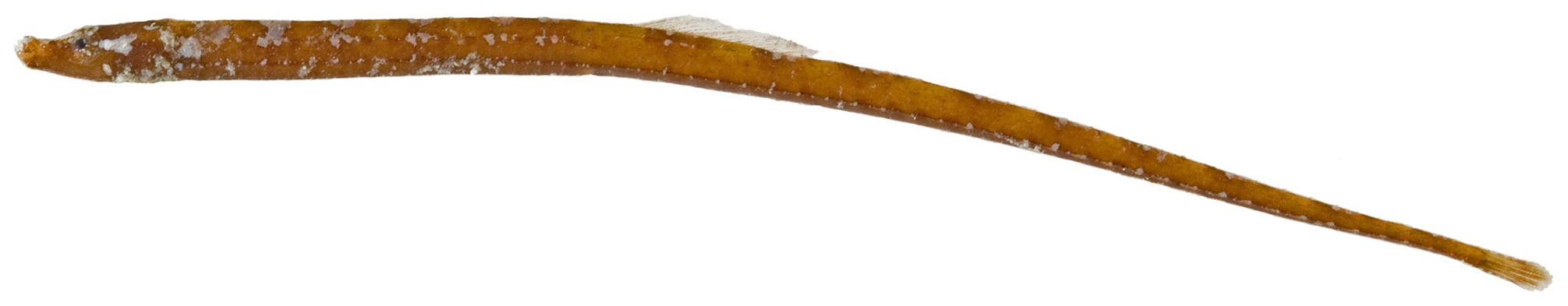
- Bryx randalli

Scientific classification
- Kingdom: Animalia
- Phylum: Chordata
- Class: Actinopterygii
- Order: Syngnathiformes
- Family: Syngnathidae
- Subfamily: Syngnathinae
- Genus: Bryx; Herald, 1940

Type species
- Bryx veleronis Herald, 1940

Synonyms
- Microsyngnathus Herald, 1959

= Bryx =

Genus of fishes

Bryx is a genus of pipefishes.

== Species ==
The currently recognized species in this genus are:

- Bryx analicarens (Duncker, 1915) (pink pipefish)
- Bryx dunckeri (Metzelaar, 1919) (pugnose pipefish)
- Bryx randalli (Herald, 1965)
- Bryx veleronis Herald, 1940
