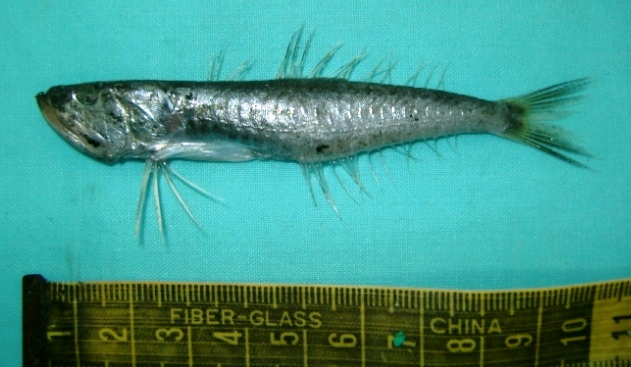

Scientific classification
- Kingdom: Animalia
- Phylum: Chordata
- Class: Actinopterygii
- Order: Acropomatiformes
- Family: Champsodontidae
- Genus: Champsodon
- Species: C. nudivittis

Binomial name
- Champsodon nudivittis (Ogilby, 1895)

Synonyms
- Centropercis nudivittis Ogilby, 1895; Champsodon arafurensis Regan, 1908; Champsodon curtipes Fowler, 1943

= Champsodon nudivittis =

Species of ray-finned fish

Champsodon nudivittis, also known as the nakedband gaper, is a species of marine ray-finned fish, a crocodile toothfish belonging to the family Champsodontidae. It occurs in the Indo-West Pacific from Madagascar, Indonesia, the Philippines and Australia. It was recorded in 2008 in Iskenderun Bay on the Mediterranean coast of Turkey, likely introduced by ballast water. It is now commonly found from Greece to Israel in the eastern Mediterranean Sea.
