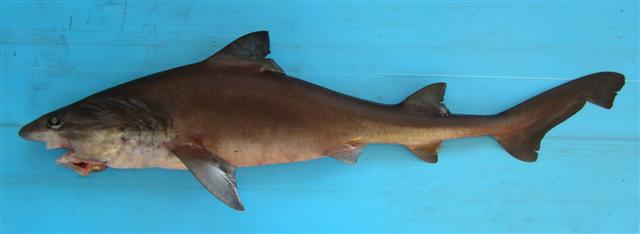

Scientific classification
- Kingdom: Animalia
- Phylum: Chordata
- Class: Chondrichthyes
- Subclass: Elasmobranchii
- Division: Selachii
- Order: Carcharhiniformes
- Family: Triakidae
- Subfamily: Galeorhininae
- Genus: Iago; L. J. V. Compagno & S. Springer, 1971

Type species
- Eugaleus omanensis J.R. Norman, 1939

= Iago (shark) =

Genus of sharks

Iago is a genus of houndsharks in the family Triakidae. The name comes from the villain in William Shakespeare´s Othello.

== Species ==
Three recognized extant species are in this genus:

- Iago garricki Fourmanoir & Rivaton, 1979 (longnose houndshark)
- Iago gopalakrishnani Bineesh, Beura & Akhilesh, 2025 (Indian houndshark)
- Iago omanensis Norman, 1939 (bigeye houndshark)
