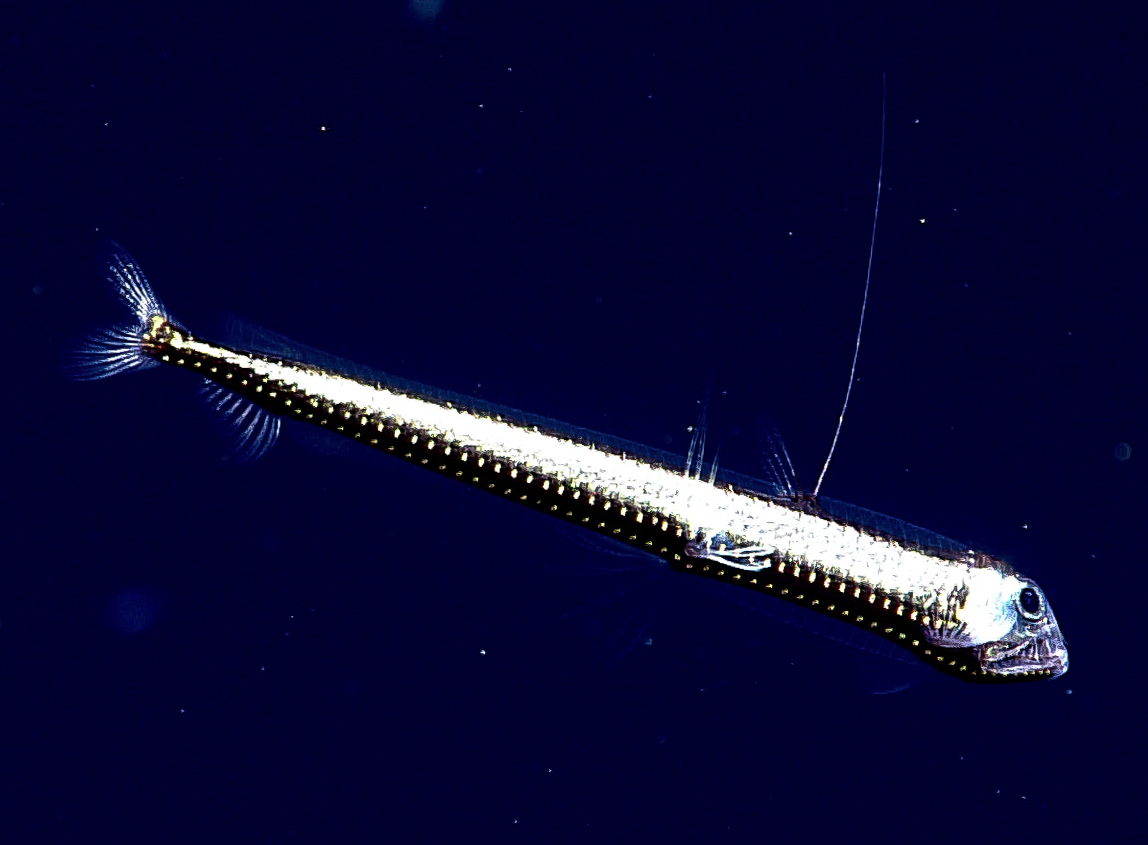
- Dana Viperfish, Chauliodus danae

Scientific classification
- Kingdom: Animalia
- Phylum: Chordata
- Class: Actinopterygii
- Division: Teleostei
- Order: Stomiiformes
- Family: Stomiidae
- Subfamily: Stomiinae
- Genus: Chauliodus; Bloch & J. G. Schneider, 1801

Species
- See text

= Viperfish =

Viperfish Temporal range: 11–0 Ma Late Miocene to Present

Genus of fishes

A viperfish is any species of the genus Chauliodus, marine fish inhabiting the twilight or mesopelagic zone. Viperfish are at most around 30 cm (12 in), and are characterized by silvery scales, long needle-like teeth and photophores along the ventral side of their body (though other fish of the family Stomiidae often have the latter two traits).

The photophores or light organs allow viperfish to bioluminesce, which likely allows them to camouflage against the 1% of sunlight that reaches to below 200 m (660 ft) depth, an ability known as counter-illumination. They are found all around the world in tropical and temperate oceans, and undergo diel vertical migration to feed.

== Description ==
Viperfish are covered in silvery scales arranged in five longitudinal rows. These scales are easily shed, and may also be dissolved in preservation fluid when specimens are preserved, leading some publications to describe them as scaleless. Beneath the scales, the skin is covered with hexagonal pigment patterns and an opalescent, slimy substance.

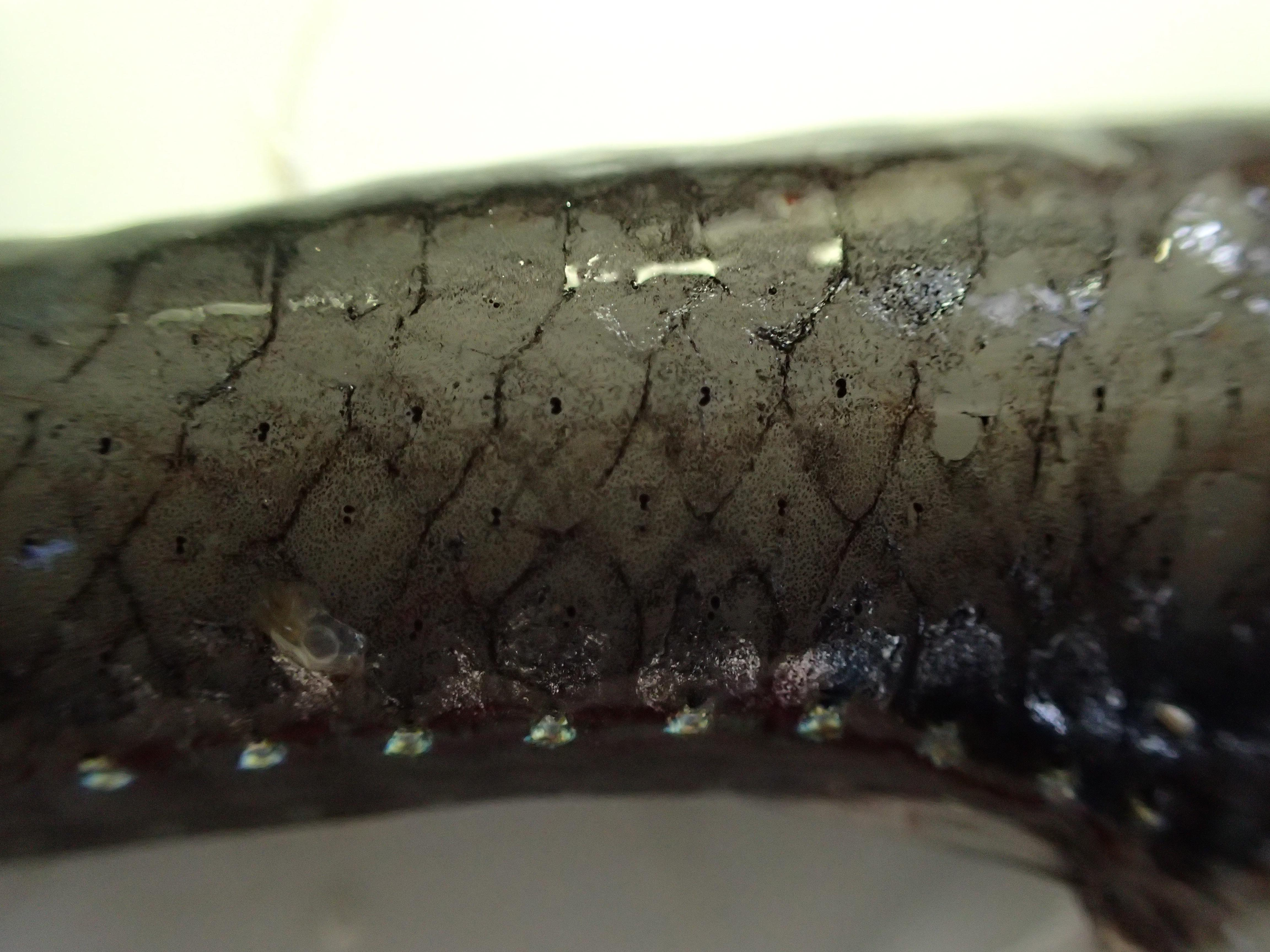
Lateral closeup of a Chauliodus sloani specimen from the Mediterranean

One species of viperfish, C. sloani, has a sampled standard length of 64 to 260 mm (2.5 to 10.2 in), with a mean SL of 120.3 mm (4.74 in). The same species has a mean weight of 5.66 g (0.200 oz). Representatives from Chauliodus pammelas and Chauliodus sloani display a size-based depth differential. Individuals of a lesser mass are found at shallower depths and individuals of larger mass are found at deeper depths, below 500 m (1,600 ft). However, larger viperfish can be found in shallower depths at nighttime.

The eyes of Chauliodus sloani maintain a constant size and proportion throughout growth of the fish. In the retina, several rows of rod cell "banks" grow upon each other, increasing in number with size of the fish. This opposed the typical vertebrate retina, which only has one layer of receptors.

Chauliodus species are recognized by their prominent fang-like teeth. They are so long that they would pierce the brain of the fish if misaligned. As is typical for the Stomiidae family, they have a specialised "loosejaw" arrangement that allows for wide jaw opening, jaw extension, and rapid adduction. Chauliodus sloani uses a unique ventral jaw muscle called the Aω, which improves the biting force and jaw-closing speed. This adaptation, presumed to exist in other species of Chauliodus, improves their ability to capture prey in deep sea environments.

The first dorsal ray of Chauliodus is elongated, hinged, and connected to a muscular system, allowing it to swing forward. The tip of this ray has light organs. Chauliodus has additional photophores along the ventral side of its body that emit light through adrenergic nervous control.

== Species ==
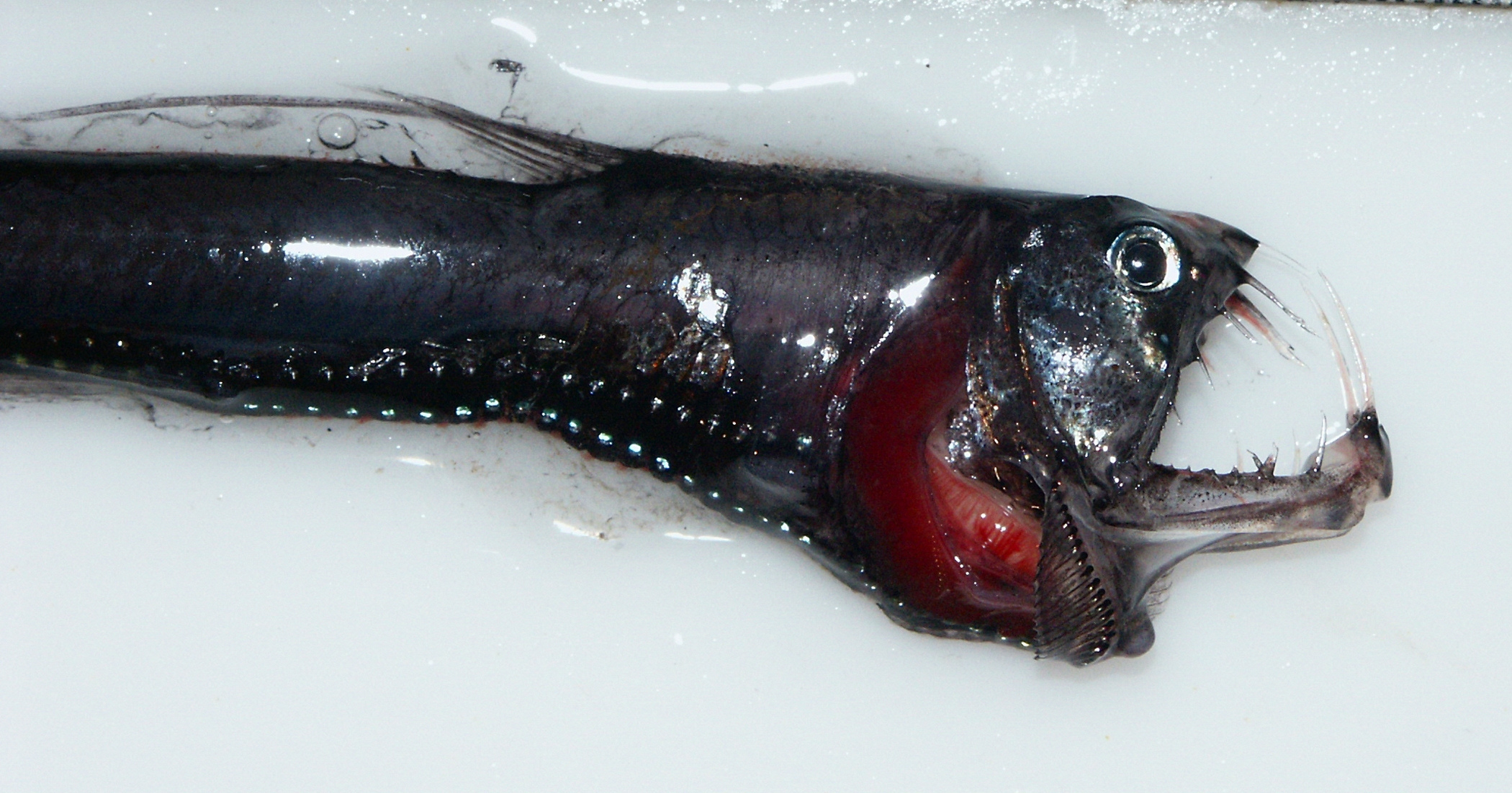
Pacific viperfish (Chauliodus macouni)

There are currently nine extant recognized species in this genus:

- Chauliodus barbatus Garman, 1899
- Chauliodus danae Regan & Trewavas, 1929 (Dana viperfish)
- Chauliodus dentatus Garman, 1899
- Chauliodus macouni T. H. Bean, 1890 (pacific viperfish)
- Chauliodus minimus Parin & Novikova, 1974
- Chauliodus pammelas Alcock, 1892
- Chauliodus schmidti Ege, 1948
- Chauliodus sloani Bloch & J. G. Schneider, 1801 (Sloane's viperfish)
- Chauliodus vasnetzovi Novikova, 1972

At least two fossil species are recognized from the Late Miocene:

- Chauliodus eximus, (Jordan, 1925), originally Eostomias eximus, from Late Miocene California
- Chauliodus testa, Nazarkin, 2014, from the Late Miocene of Western Sakhalin Island

== Habitat ==
Viperfish live in meso- and bathypelagic environments and have been found dominating submarine calderas such as the Kurose Hole, which is the site with the highest Chauliodus density known in the world.

Viperfish have been recorded in the Italian waters off the western Mediterranean Basin, the Adriatic Sea, the Greek waters of the Aegean Sea, and in the Turkish waters of the Levant Sea. Viperfish have rarely been seen off the Algerian coast by Dieuzeide. They have been reported to occur off the northern Tunisian coast.

== Biology ==
=== Bioluminescence ===
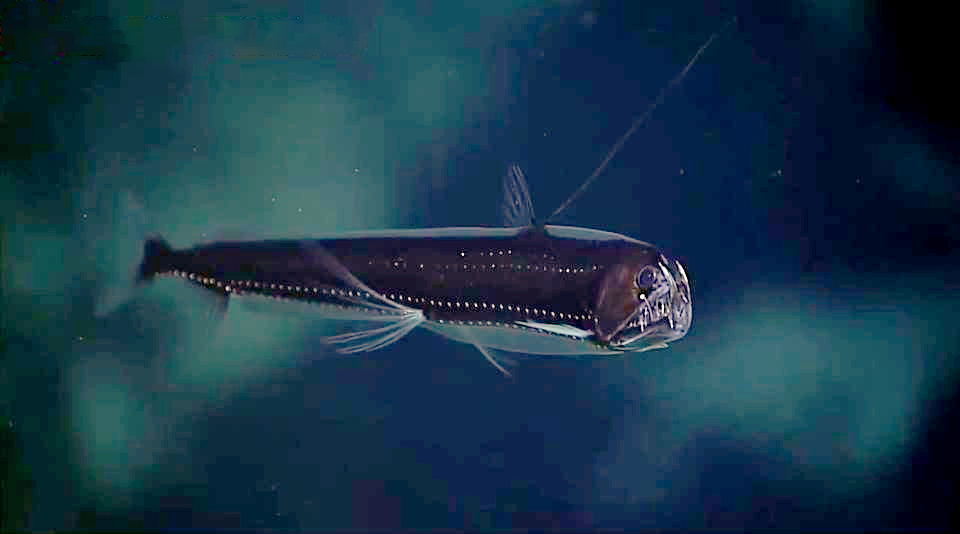
Chauliodus sp.; Samoa

The presence of photo-microbes in the visceral organs of Chauliodus sloani indicates that bioluminescent bacterias are likely responsible for Chauliodus' ability to luminesce. Chauliodus species utilize their capability of bioluminescence for two distinct purposes: attracting prey and avoiding predators. They show distinct anatomical adaptations for the two functions: the photophores for each purpose are located in distinct locations on the body.

Chauliodus possesses a bioluminescent lure located at the tip of its first dorsal ray, which it uses to attract prey by swinging it forward in front of its mouth. This light allows the fish to lure prey directly in front of its mouth for feeding. In contrast, the ventral photophores allows viperfish to closely match the dim sunlight in mesopelagic and bathypelagic ocean zones, making it more difficult for predators to see viperfish through counter-illumination.

=== Feeding ===
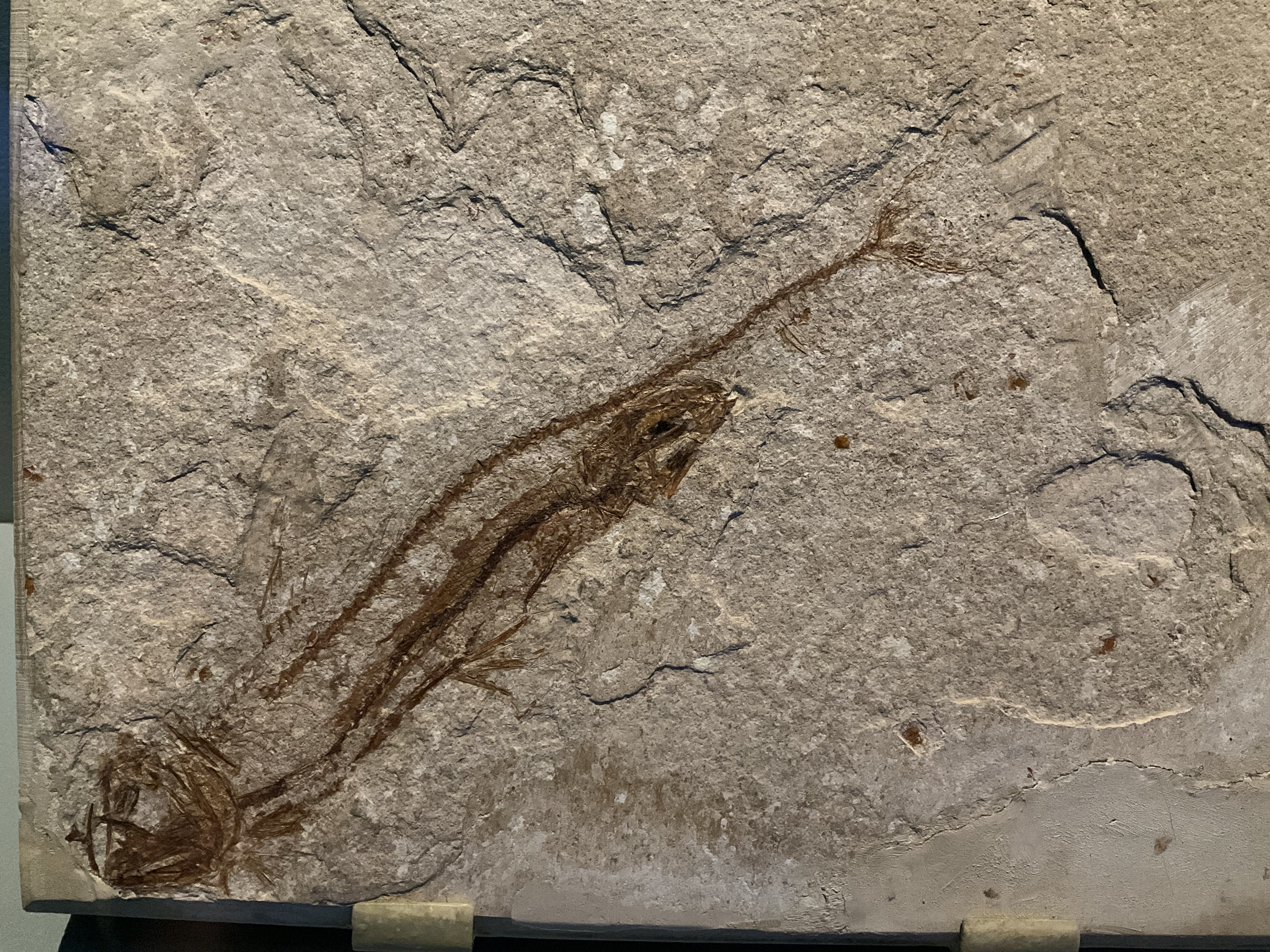
†Chauliodus eximius fossil showing swallowed prey

Viperfish prey on other pelagic fishes and crustaceans: stomach contents of captured individuals have contained lanternfishes, bristlemouths, copepods and krill. The prey of C. sloani are highly specific and of high abundance, but feeding events for viperfish have low levels of occurrence.

Viperfish are able to maximize energy input by consuming few but large prey. In order to support their feeding method, viperfish have multiple adaptations such as a large-toothed mouth, modifications in its skull to allow for a wide opening of its mouth, and elastic stomach and body skin to accommodate relatively large prey.

Based on the diel vertical migration of its prey, viperfish are assumed to be epipelagic migrants that search surface waters for food.

=== Migration ===
Many species in the Stomiidae family participated in diel vertical migration, including viperfish. In migrating to the surface (400 m (1,300 ft) depth) at night, they prove their ability to withstand large temperature changes of up to 7 °C (13 °F) daily, having a temperature range of 4 to 14.5 °C (39.2 to 58.1 °F), highlighting the wide range of temperatures viperfish are capable of surviving in.

Vertical movements of viperfish are influenced by temperature. It was observed that the upper limit of distribution is restricted by temperature (12–15 °C (54–59 °F)). That is observed to affect vertical habitat and trophodynamics. In most tropical waters, it is likely that viperfish exist full time below 400 m (1,300 ft). In temperate regions, viperfish trophically interact with epipelagic predators at superficial waters.

However, it is likely that only part of the total population of viperfishes engages in diel vertical migration on any given night, which could be due to their slow metabolism, i.e. they likely do not have to feed every night.

=== Reproduction ===
Despite the abundance of viperfish in the meso- and bathypelagic, their reproductive ecology is widely unknown. This is due to research surveys rarely being able to catch mature adults, as well as the general lack of research on fish reproductive ecology in the deep sea. It is likely, however, that viperfish share a similar reproductive ecology to other dragonfishes Stomiidae which have been studied more extensively.

Viperfish are gonochoristic, meaning that they don't exhibit both testicular and ovarian tissue simultaneously in their gonads. They reproduce through spawning, with a study on dragonfishes indicating that males are able to spawn sperm continuously whereas females display asynchronous oocyte development and batch spawning. That same study showed a skewed 1:2 sex ratio favoring females in their collection of over seventy Chauliodus sloani viperfishes in the Gulf of Mexico.

Two Chauliodus macouni eggs were recovered in the Columbia River in Oregon (likely displaced by strong Pacific currents), indicating a potentially long incubation period for viperfish eggs.

== See also ==
- Bathypelagic fish
- Deep-sea fish
- Mesopelagic zone
