= Champsodon vorax =

Scientific classification
- Kingdom: Animalia
- Phylum: Chordata
- Class: Actinopterygii
- Order: Acropomatiformes
- Family: Champsodontidae
- Genus: Champsodon
- Species: C. vorax

Binomial name
- Champsodon vorax (Günther, 1867)

Synonyms
- Champsodon microphthalmus Regan, 1908

Species of ray-finned fish

Champsodon vorax, also known as the greedy gaper, is a species of marine ray-finned fish, a crocodile toothfish belonging to the family Champsodontidae. It occurs in the Indo-West Pacific from Maldives, Australia, Vietnam, Philippines, Indonesia and Guam. It has also been recorded in the Mediterranean Sea off the coast of Lebanon.
