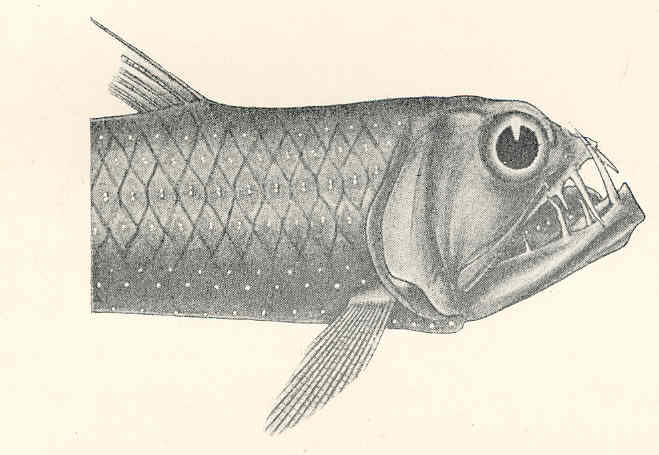

Conservation status
- Least Concern (IUCN 3.1)

Scientific classification
- Kingdom: Animalia
- Phylum: Chordata
- Class: Actinopterygii
- Order: Stomiiformes
- Family: Stomiidae
- Genus: Chauliodus
- Species: C. pammelas

Binomial name
- Chauliodus pammelas Alcock, 1892

= Chauliodus pammelas =

Species of fish

Chauliodus pammelas is a species of viperfish in the family Stomiidae. The species has been widely documented off the coast of Yemen, Somalia and India, and fully-grown members of the species can reach a maximum length of 19.5 centimeters. In the Arabian Sea, C. pammelas were commonly seen during the day at a vertical distribution of 750 to 1000 m, while during the night, the distribution is wider.
