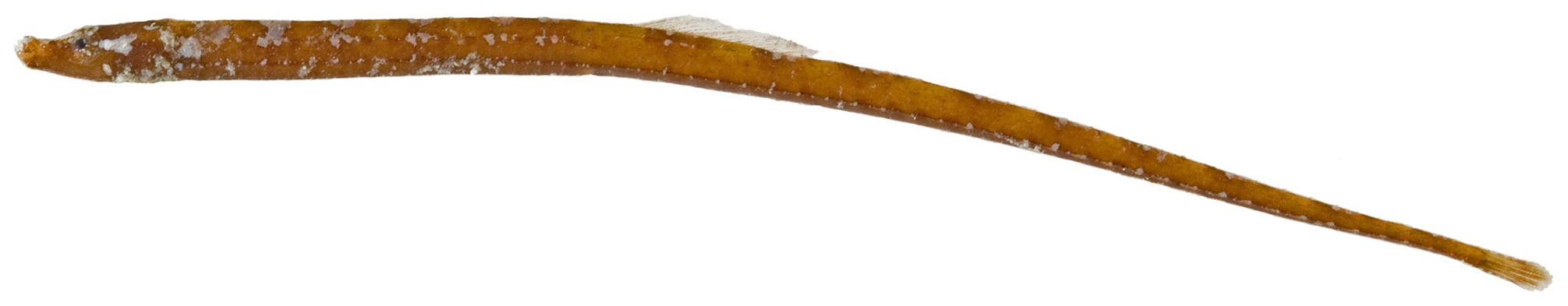

Conservation status
- Least Concern (IUCN 3.1)

Scientific classification
- Kingdom: Animalia
- Phylum: Chordata
- Class: Actinopterygii
- Order: Syngnathiformes
- Family: Syngnathidae
- Genus: Bryx
- Species: B. randalli

Binomial name
- Bryx randalli Herald, 1965

Synonyms
- Syngnathus randalli Herald, 1965

= Bryx randalli =

Ocellated pipefish

Species of fish

Bryx randalli, the ocellated pipefish, is a species of marine fish of the family Syngnathidae. It is found in the western Atlantic in the Caribbean Sea, where it inhabits the shallow subtidal zone to depths of 30m. It feeds on benthic invertebrates such as crabs and molluscs, and is less than 10 cm long. This species is ovoviviparous, with the males carrying the eggs in their brood pouch until they hatch.
