= Bryx dunckeri =

Pugnose pipefish

Conservation status
- Least Concern (IUCN 3.1)

Scientific classification
- Domain: Eukaryota
- Kingdom: Animalia
- Phylum: Chordata
- Class: Actinopterygii
- Order: Syngnathiformes
- Family: Syngnathidae
- Genus: Bryx
- Species: B. dunckeri

Binomial name
- Bryx dunckeri Metzelaar, 1919

Synonyms
- Syngnathus dunckeri Metzelaar, 1919

Species of fish

Bryx dunckeri (pugnose pipefish) is a species of pipefish of the family Syngnathidae. It is found in the western Atlantic Ocean, from North Carolina to Florida and the Bahamas, in the Gulf of Mexico, and off South America to Macau, Brazil. It inhabits shallow waters (1–30 metres (3.3–98.4 ft)) above algae and rock, both in estuaries and seagrass beds. It primarily feeds on benthic invertebrates such as crabs and molluscs, and can grow to lengths of 10 centimetres (3.9 in). This species is ovoviviparous, with the males carrying eggs until they are ready to hatch.
