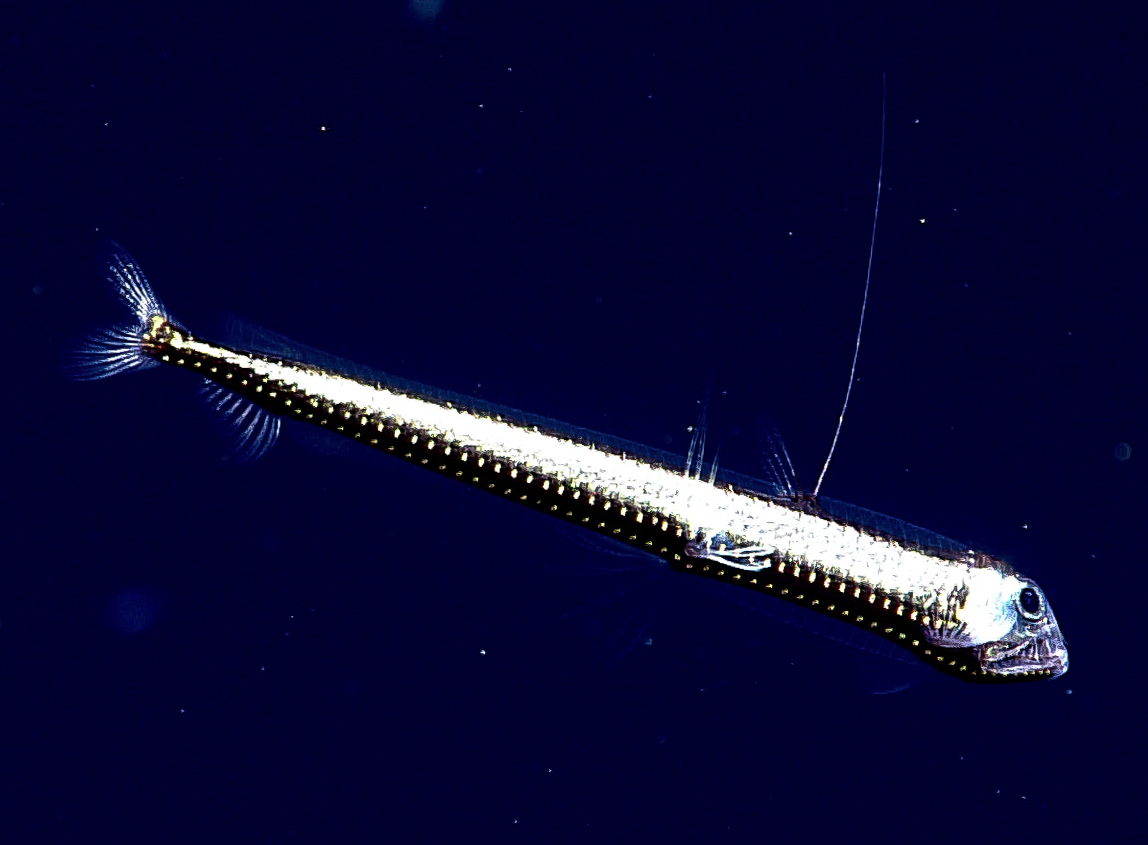
- Dana viperfish

Conservation status
- Least Concern (IUCN 3.1)

Scientific classification
- Kingdom: Animalia
- Phylum: Chordata
- Class: Actinopterygii
- Order: Stomiiformes
- Family: Stomiidae
- Genus: Chauliodus
- Species: C. danae

Binomial name
- Chauliodus danae Regan & Trewavas, 1929

= Chauliodus danae =

Species of fish

Chauliodus danae, or dana viperfish, is a species of viperfish in the family Stomiidae. The Dana Viperfish is mostly found in the bathyal zone. The species was first caught and recognised on the Dana expeditions 1920-1922 and named after the research vessel Dana.
