= Bryx veleronis =

Offshore pipefish

Conservation status
- Data Deficient (IUCN 3.1)

Scientific classification
- Kingdom: Animalia
- Phylum: Chordata
- Class: Actinopterygii
- Order: Syngnathiformes
- Family: Syngnathidae
- Genus: Bryx
- Species: B. veleronis

Binomial name
- Bryx veleronis Herald, 1940

Synonyms
- Bryx clarionensis Fritzsche, 1980

Species of fish

Bryx veleronis (offshore pipefish) is a species of marine fish of the family Syngnathidae. It is found in the Eastern Pacific, off the coasts of Mexico, Costa Rica, Panama, Malpelo Island (Colombia), and the Galápagos Islands (Ecuador). There is very little known about this species, but it is thought to inhabit depth ranges of roughly 30-40m, grow to lengths of 6 cm, and consume small crustaceans. It is ovoviviparous, with males carrying eggs in a brood pouch until they hatch.
