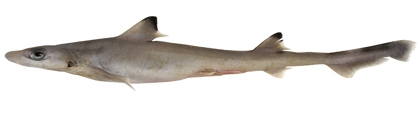

Conservation status
- Least Concern (IUCN 3.1)

Scientific classification
- Kingdom: Animalia
- Phylum: Chordata
- Class: Chondrichthyes
- Subclass: Elasmobranchii
- Division: Selachii
- Order: Carcharhiniformes
- Family: Triakidae
- Genus: Iago
- Species: I. garricki

Binomial name
- Iago garricki Fourmanoir & Rivaton, 1979
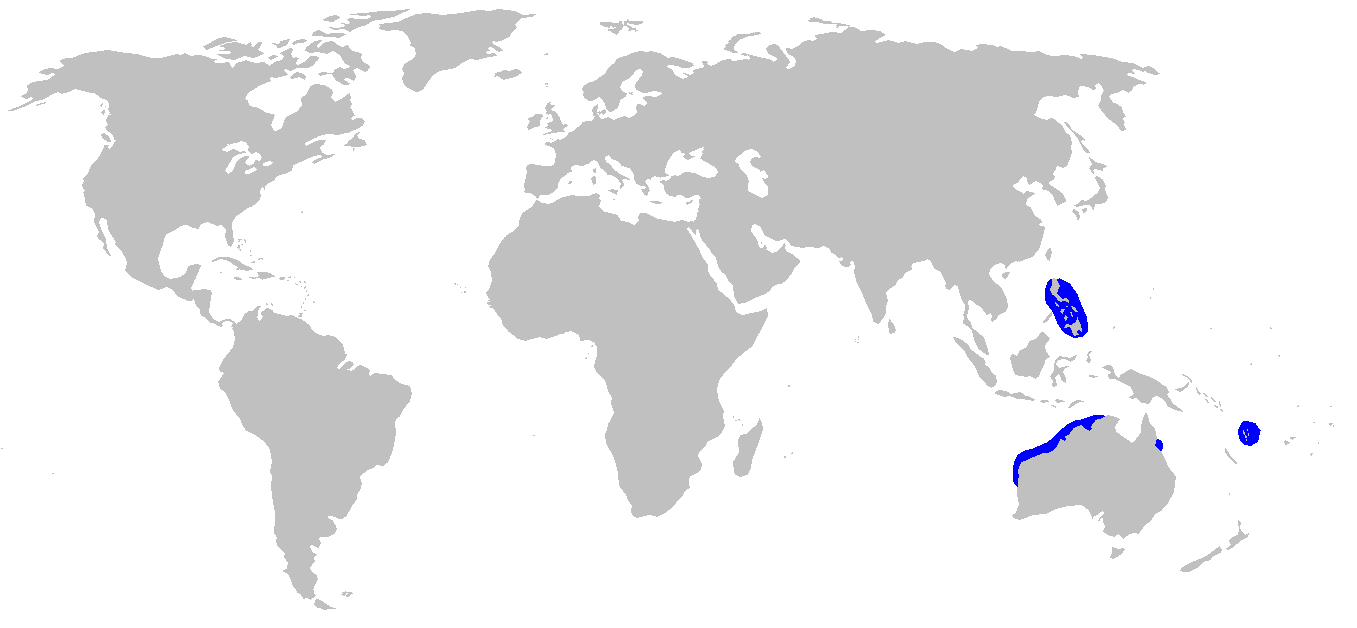

= Longnose houndshark =

Species of shark

The longnose houndshark (Iago garricki) is a houndshark of the family Triakidae. It is found in the western Pacific off northern Australia and Vanuatu, between latitudes 9° S and 26° S, at depths between 250 and 475 m. It can grow up to a length of 75 cm.
