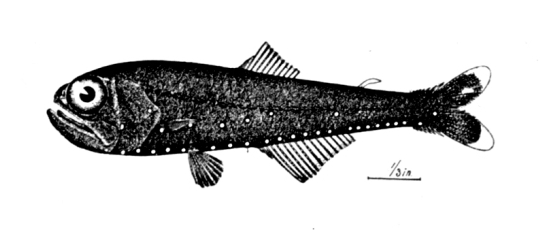
- Glacier Lantern Fish (B. glaciale)]

Scientific classification
- Kingdom: Animalia
- Phylum: Chordata
- Class: Actinopterygii
- Division: Teleostei
- Order: Myctophiformes
- Family: Myctophidae
- Genus: Benthosema; Goode & T. H. Bean, 1896

= Benthosema =

Genus of fishes

Benthosema is a genus of lanternfishes.

== Species ==
The currently recognized species in this genus are:

- Benthosema fibulatum (C. H. Gilbert & Cramer, 1897) (spinycheek lanternfish)
- Benthosema glaciale (J. C. H. Reinhardt, 1837) (glacier lantern fish)
- Benthosema panamense (Tåning, 1932) (lamp fish)
- Benthosema pterotum (Alcock, 1890) (skinnycheek lanternfish)
- †Benthosema rarang (Mediodia & Lin in Mediodia, 2026)
- Benthosema suborbitale (C. H. Gilbert, 1913) (smallfin lanternfish)
