= Chauliodus dentatus =

Conservation status
- Data Deficient (IUCN 3.1)

Scientific classification
- Kingdom: Animalia
- Phylum: Chordata
- Class: Actinopterygii
- Order: Stomiiformes
- Family: Stomiidae
- Genus: Chauliodus
- Species: C. dentatus

Binomial name
- Chauliodus dentatus Garman, 1899

Species of fish

Chauliodus dentatus is a species of viperfish in the family Stomiidae. The species has been observed in the Pacific Ocean.
