= Chauliodus testa =

Chauliodus testa Temporal range: Middle Miocene

Scientific classification
- Kingdom: Animalia
- Phylum: Chordata
- Class: Actinopterygii
- Order: Stomiiformes
- Family: Stomiidae
- Genus: Chauliodus
- Species: †C. testa

Binomial name
- †Chauliodus testa Nazarkin, 2014

Extinct species of fish

Chauliodus testa is an extinct viperfish in the family Stomiidae from the marine Middle Miocene (late Langhian or early Serravallian)-aged Kurasi Formation of Western Sakhalin Island.

== See also ==
- Viperfish
