= Gaper (fish) =

Conservation status
- Least Concern (IUCN 3.1)

Scientific classification
- Kingdom: Animalia
- Phylum: Chordata
- Class: Actinopterygii
- Order: Acropomatiformes
- Family: Champsodontidae
- Genus: Champsodon
- Species: C. capensis

Binomial name
- Champsodon capensis Regan, 1908

Species of ray-finned fish

The gaper (Champsodon capensis) is a species of crocodile toothfish belonging to the family Champsodontidae. It is found in the Indian Ocean along the coast of East Africa, from Kenya to South Africa, as well as off the islands of Seychelles and Mauritius. This species has entered the Mediterranean Sea, most likely as a Lessepsian migrant, through the Suez Canal, being first recorded in 2012. Gapers are typically found in large shoals, which move from deep water to the surface at night.
