= Cynoglossus acutirostris =

Scientific classification
- Kingdom: Animalia
- Phylum: Chordata
- Class: Actinopterygii
- Order: Carangiformes
- Suborder: Pleuronectoidei
- Family: Cynoglossidae
- Genus: Cynoglossus
- Species: C. acutirostris

Binomial name
- Cynoglossus acutirostris Norman, 1939

Species of fish

Cynoglossus acutirostris, commonly known as the Sharpnose tongue sole is a species of tonguefish. It is commonly found in sandy waters of the western Indian Ocean, particularly the Red Sea and the Gulf of Aden.
