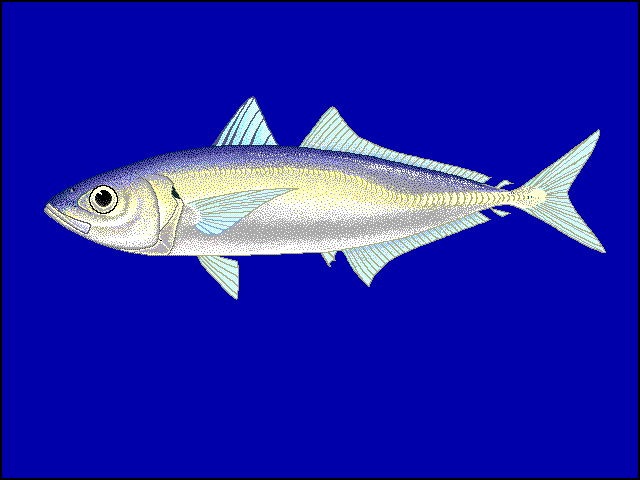

Conservation status
- Least Concern (IUCN 3.1)

Scientific classification
- Kingdom: Animalia
- Phylum: Chordata
- Class: Actinopterygii
- Order: Carangiformes
- Suborder: Carangoidei
- Family: Carangidae
- Genus: Decapterus
- Species: D. russelli

Binomial name
- Decapterus russelli (Rüppell, 1830 )

Synonyms
- Caranx russelli Rüppell, 1830; Caranx kiliche Cuvier, 1831; Decapterus lajang Bleeker, 1855; Caranx ecclipsifer De Vis, 1855; Decapterus dayi Wakiya, 1924

= Decapterus russelli =

Species of fish

Decapterus russelli, also known as the Indian scad, northern mackerel scad, round scad, Russell's mackerel scad, slender scad, or three lined grunter, is a species of ray-finned fish in the family Carangidae. It naturally occurs in the Indian and the western Pacific Oceans and has colonised the eastern Mediterranean through the Suez Canal. It is an important species in coastal fisheries throughout its range.

== Description ==
Decapterus russelli has an elongate, somewhat slender and slightly compressed body. The eyes are of moderate size and have a well developed adipose eyelid which completely covers eye apart from a vertical slit which has the pupil in its centre. The scales on top of head do not reach a line running through the centre of pupil. The lateral line has a low regular arch towards the head and the curved and straight parts meet below the second dorsal fin between 11th to 13th soft rays; there are 42–62 scales in the curved part of the lateral line and between 0 and 4 scutes, while the straight part has 0 to 4 scales which are followed by 30 to 40 scutes, meaning that the total count of scales and scutes is between 77 and 102 if caudal scutes are excluded). There is a dusky or transparent membrane at the join of the upper jaw, the posterior end of the upper jaw is straight above and a little concave and not horizontal antero-ventrally. Both jaws bear an anterior row of minute teeth which is quite irregular with a single series of posterior teeth. There are 10–14 upper gill rakers and 30 to 39 lower making a total of 41 to 53 on the first gill arch. The shoulder girdle has 3 small papillae on its margin, the lower one being the larger. There are two widely separate dorsal fins, the first is triangular with 8 spines and the second has one spine with 28–33 soft rays. The anal fin has 2 detached spines followed by a single spine and 25–29 soft rays; the terminal dorsal and anal soft rays consist of a widely detached finlet. The pectoral fin measures 76.5 to 97.0% of the head length. In life it is bluish-green above and silvery below with a small black blotch on the margin of operculum near its upper edge. Caudal fin varies from translucent to dark brown, the second dorsal fin is translucent at its base but light blackish-brown towards the margin; the other fins are mostly translucent, other than the pelvic fins of adult males which are slightly darker. The spines and rays on the dorsal and anal fin are grey, those on the other finds are white. Its length is up to 45 cm total length, more usually 30 cm and the maximum weight is 110 g.

== Distribution ==
Decapterus russelli occurs throughout the Indian Ocean, from the coasts of eastern Africa from the Gulf of Suez as far south as South Africa to Indonesia, eastwards into the western Pacific Ocean, from Japan in the north and south to Australia. First recorded in the Mediterranean Sea off Israel in 2005, it is now common in Levantine waters up to Iskenderun (Turkey) and has become an important species in local fisheries.

== Biology ==
Adult Decapterus russelli are benthic and form large schools in deeper water, although they may occasionally be found inshore in smaller groups where there are sheltered bays. It is the most common species of Decapterus in coastal waters and on open shallows of the Indian Ocean. Their main prey is smaller planktonic invertebrates, with a study off India finding that the prawn Acetes indicus being the most numerous prey for both adult and juvenile fish but larger specimens hunt a wide variety of suitably sized fish, including Lactarius lactarius, Leiognathus spp., lanternfishes, eels, Nemipterus spp., Saurida tumbil, Boleophthalmus sp., Bregmaceros mcclellandi, Polynemus heptadactylus, Polynemus indicus, Cynoglossus spp., Trichiurus lepturus and Stolephorus spp. It is host to the ectoparasitic copepod Lernanthropus decapteri. It reaches sexual maturity at around 1 year old and about 12 cm in length.

== Human usage ==
Global capture production of Indian scad (Decapterus russelli) in thousand tonnes from 1950 to 2022, as reported by the FAO

Decapterus russelli is fished for wherever it occurs, normally using seine nets and trawls. In 1999 the total catch was just short of 160,000 tonnes, with the two major fishing nations being Thailand and Malaysia, which landed 82,000 tonnes and 70,160 tonnes respectively. Since the 1950s the weight of Indian scad landed fluctuates and there is no increasing or decreasing trend apparent in the population, however in south-east Asia there has been a marked increase in effort which has not seen an increase in landings suggesting the fishery is over-exploited. It is generally marketed fresh, may be dried or salted, as well as being sold frozen and canned.

== Etymology ==
The specific name honours the Scottish surgeon and herpetologist Patrick Russell (1726–1805) who had described and illustrated in 1803 but did not give it a specific name.

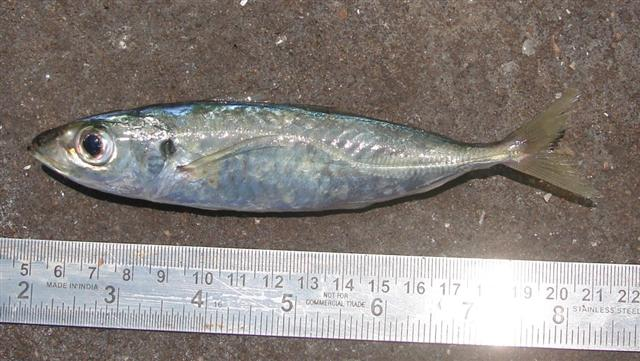
Decapterus russelli from India
