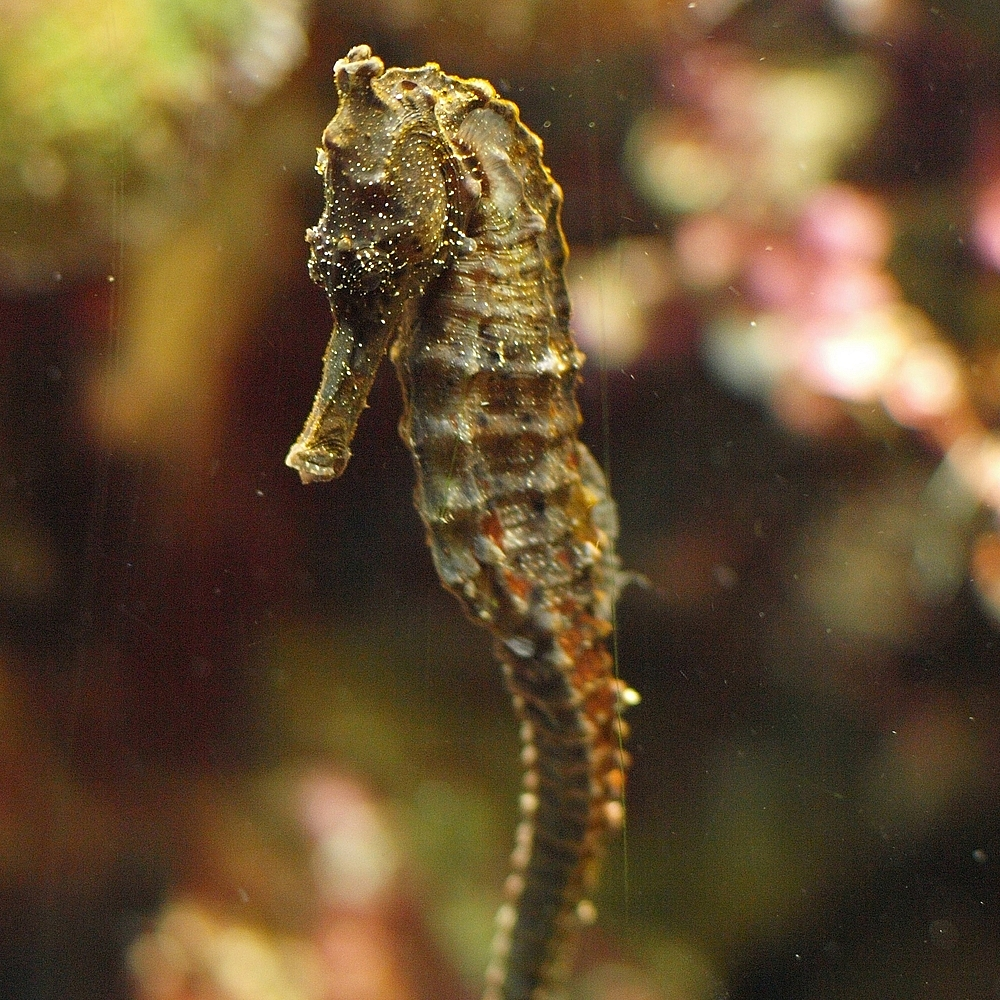

Conservation status
- Vulnerable (IUCN 3.1)
- CITES Appendix II

Scientific classification
- Kingdom: Animalia
- Phylum: Chordata
- Class: Actinopterygii
- Division: Teleostei
- Order: Syngnathiformes
- Family: Syngnathidae
- Genus: Hippocampus
- Species: H. kelloggi

Binomial name
- Hippocampus kelloggi D. S. Jordan & Snyder, 1901

= Great seahorse =

Species of fish

The great seahorse (Hippocampus kelloggi), also known as Kellogg's seahorse, is a species of fish in the family Syngnathidae. It is one of the largest of the 54 species of seahorse.

== Habitat ==
It is found in the Indo-pacific region, specifically documented from the coast of East Africa to Japan. It was also recently identified around both northern and southern Australia. They frequent areas with an abundance of coral so they can latch on to something. Though often found in shallow waters, they have been recorded in depths of over 100 meters, with the deepest recorded seahorse at 152 meters below the surface. .

== Description ==
The head of the seahorse resembles a crown. Its spine is very prevalent, but has a rounded shape, especially above its eye. It is often confused for other species, and some great seahorses have even been thought to be an entirely new species, but gene sequencing has disproved this. They can be identified through their abnormally high tail rings on their comparatively slightly longer tails, which account for about 57% of their bodies. It is pale in color and smooth to the touch. They live for two to four years in the wild.

== Reproduction ==
Males breed the eggs in sacks. Gestation lasts a few weeks, then males will release the eggs without caring for them. Generally, males are ready to breed again almost immediately after giving birth. Though little is known about the great seahorse's specific breeding habits, many related seahorses have been studied and were found to occasionally be monogamous. Their mating ritual involves twisting their tails and head nods, until they find a partner. Though the males carry the unborn young, they are also the main competitors for mates, which may have to do with an uneven ratio of males to females in a population.

== Population structure and size ==
Because the occurrence of the seahorse spans such a wide area, there is little data available regarding the size of the population, but it has been observed less in recent years, leading scientists to believe that the population is declining. There was a 50-60% decline in population size around Asia. It is generally found alone or in very sparse groups. It is considered vulnerable, which is one classification away from endangerment.

== Captivity and use ==
Like many other species of seahorse, the great seahorse is used both medicinally and for aquariums. It's one of the harder types to purchase and care for, as it is large and does not compete well with others for food, often resulting in early death. One of the major reasons the great seahorse is removed from captivity is due to its medicinal effects in China and other east Asian countries. It is said to help with problems such as impotence, and its prevalence on the market has increased in recent years. Aside from personal aquariums and medicine, the great seahorse is also used as a souvenir, often available dried for people to take home. The combination of these three has led the great seahorse to be labeled as vulnerable.

== Naming ==
The specific name honours the American entomologist and evolutionary biologist Vernon Lyman Kellogg 1867-1937.
