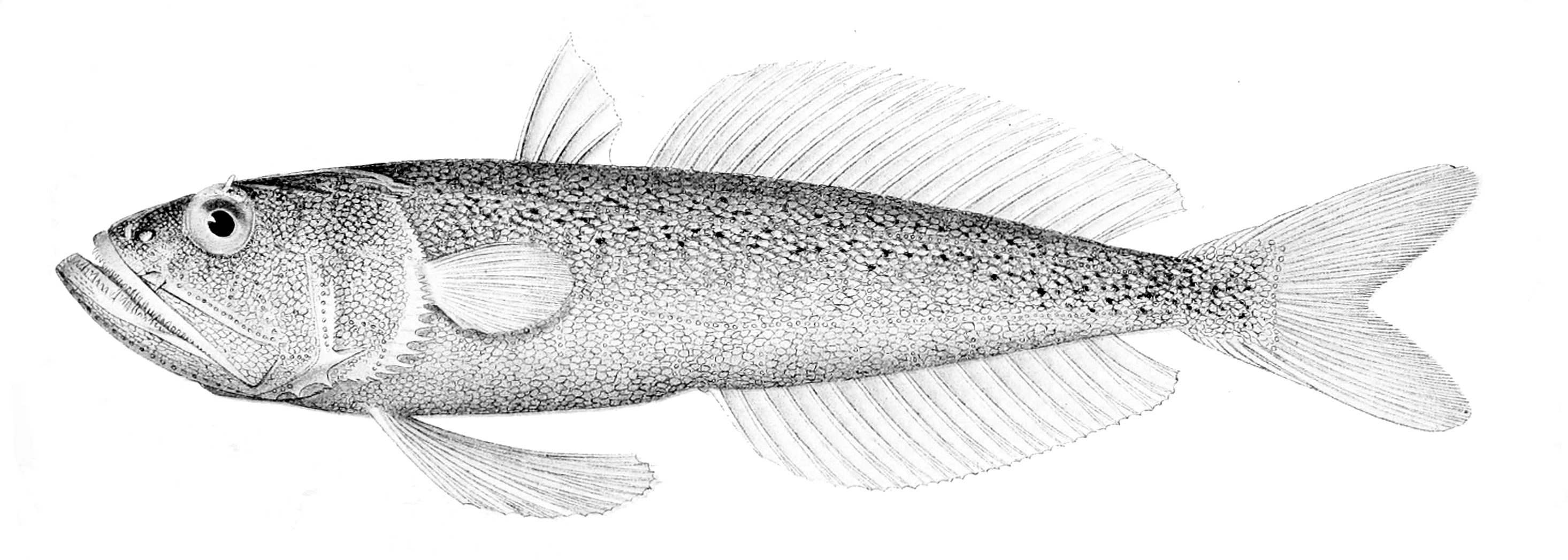
- C. fimbriatus

Scientific classification
- Kingdom: Animalia
- Phylum: Chordata
- Class: Actinopterygii
- Order: Acropomatiformes
- Family: Champsodontidae; Jordan & Snyder, 1902
- Genus: Champsodon; Günther, 1867

Type species
- Champsodon vorax Günther, 1867

Synonyms
- Centropercis Ogilby, 1895

= Champsodon =

Champsodon Temporal range: Middle Eocene to present

Genus of ray-finned fishes

Champsodon is the sole genus in the family Champsodontidae. These fishes, the crocodile toothfishes, are native to the Indo-Pacific region.

Although Champsodon is the only extant genus of this family, a close relative is known in the extinct †Eochampsodon Bannikov, 2004 from the Middle Eocene (Bartonian) of the North Caucasus, Russia.

== Species ==
The currently recognized species in this genus are:

- Champsodon atridorsalis Ochiai & I. Nakamura, 1964
- Champsodon capensis Regan, 1908 (gaper)
- Champsodon fimbriatus C. H. Gilbert, 1905
- Champsodon guentheri Regan, 1908 (Günther's sabre-gills)
- Champsodon longipinnis Matsubara & Amaoka, 1964
- Champsodon machaeratus Nemeth, 1994
- Champsodon nudivittis (J. D. Ogilby, 1895)
- Champsodon omanensis Regan, 1908
- Champsodon pantolepis Nemeth, 1994
- Champsodon sagittus Nemeth, 1994
- Champsodon sechellensis Regan, 1908
- Champsodon snyderi V. Franz, 1910
- Champsodon vorax Günther, 1867

In addition to the extinct †Eochampsodon, the following fossil Champsodon species are known:

- †Champsodon grossheimi (Daniltshenko, 1960) - Early Oligocene of North Caucasus, Russia.
- †Champsodon tethensis Bannikov, 2018 - Middle Eocene (Bartonian) of North Caucasus, Russia
- †Champsodon timaruensis Schwarzhans, 2019 - Early Miocene of New Zealand [otolith]
