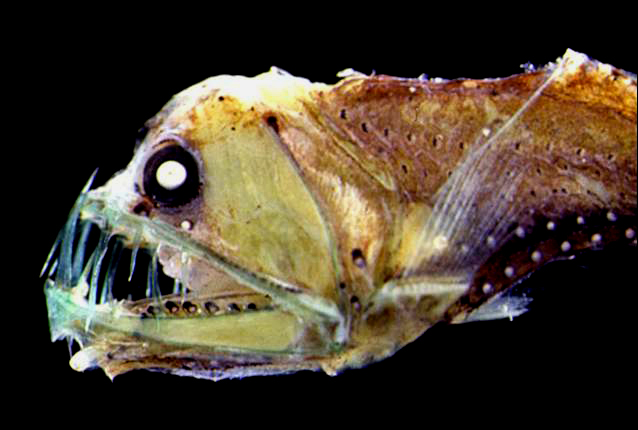

Conservation status
- Least Concern (IUCN 3.1)

Scientific classification
- Kingdom: Animalia
- Phylum: Chordata
- Class: Actinopterygii
- Division: Teleostei
- Order: Stomiiformes
- Family: Stomiidae
- Genus: Chauliodus
- Species: C. sloani

Binomial name
- Chauliodus sloani Bloch & J. G. Schneider, 1801

= Sloane's viperfish =

Sloane's viperfish Temporal range: Pliocene to recent

Species of fish

Sloane's viperfish (Chauliodus sloani), is a predatory mesopelagic dragonfish found in waters across the world. The species was first described by German scientists Marcus Elieser Bloch and Johann Gottlob Schneider in their 1801 book Systema ichthyologiae: iconibus CX illustratum, volume 1. Female C. sloani reach maturity between 133 and 191 mm, while males likely reach maturity at slightly smaller body lengths. It has two rows of photophores along its ventral side. It is believed that C. sloani can adjust the intensity of bioluminescence of the ventral photophores to camouflage itself from predators that might see its shadow from below.

== Taxonomy ==
C. sloani is part of the genus Chauliodus, which includes all viperfishes. Viperfishes are deep-sea fishes with photophores (light-producing organs), long teeth, and hinged jaws. There are nine other species in the genus, including C. danae and C. pammelas, both of which appear alongside C. sloani in primary literature. C. sloani is distinguished from other Chauliodus species by its circumglobal range.

== Distribution ==
C. sloani is found in tropical and temperate waters. It is widespread in the Atlantic Ocean and the western Mediterranean Sea, as well as the Indian and Pacific Oceans. Temperature restricts Sloane's Viperfish vertical distribution.

In the Atlantic, its latitudinal range is from 35°N - 55°N, with highest abundance around 45°N. In the Arabian Sea, its range is primarily south of 10°N.

In the central Mediterranean Sea, C. sloani is eaten as a primary part of the diet of the Atlantic bluefin tuna. Analysis of several cetaceans' stomach contents found remnants of C. sloani, including the pygmy sperm whale and Gervais's beaked whale. Both were found beached on the Canary Islands.

== Anatomy ==
=== Jaw anatomy ===
The primary feature of interest in C. sloani is its enormous teeth. When the jaw is closed, the teeth fit together to form a cage in which prey can be trapped. Its jaw can be unhinged, allowing it to open its mouth up to 90° to catch prey up to 63% its own body size. Its teeth, however, are fixed in place, attached firmly to the jawbone rather than being depressible like in some other fish species. The immobility of its huge teeth requires it to open its jaw very wide.

The size, shape, location, and number of teeth are consistent across individuals of C. sloani, and each fang is highly specialized. C. sloani likely lures prey to its mouth with its photophore, or by arching its long dorsal ray to dangle in front of its mouth. The foremost premaxillary tooth, which is relatively straight and has sharp ridges, may then be used to wound larger prey. The curved second premaxillary tooth is thought to be used like a dagger, retaining larger prey.^{5} All teeth come together into a cage to retain smaller prey.

A 2009 study showed that the teeth of C. sloani have dentin tubules while another study a decade later showed that the teeth of Aristostomias scintillans, another member of the family Stomiidae, lack dentin tubules. The reason behind the difference in presence of dentin tubules in two species of the same family has yet to be addressed.

The jaw musculature of C. sloani contains a third adductor facialis muscle ventral to the skull. Recent research suggests that it improves the mechanical advantage of the system by anteriorly displacing tohe intersegmental aponeurosis during adduction, which increases bite force and angular velocity.

=== General anatomy ===
C. sloani has a forked caudal fin, an adipose fin, and a dorsal fin located immediately behind its head. Almost all of its fins contain soft rays. C. sloani has a low lipid content (~2.4%). The body is enveloped in a thick, transparent, gelatinous casing. Like many stomiiformes, its scales and caudal skeleton are poorly ossified and it lacks a gas-filled swim bladder.

== Diet ==
C. sloani is a major consumer of myctophids (lanternfishes), other bony fishes, and crustaceans. An average C. sloani individual probably consumes at least one lanternfish every twelve days and there is no evidence to suggest that they increase their intake of food the bigger they are. Consequently, the stomachs of smaller individuals have been found containing proportionally larger prey than the prey found in the stomachs of larger individuals. However, they are not picky in their diet — they also eat other fishes, eggs, and algae. This is another thing that distinguishes them from the C. danae, which feeds mainly on crustaceans, however there has been evidence that shows smaller variations had crustaceans included in the stomach during stomach content analysis. C. sloani typically feed on large prey, and in some cases was documented to consume prey up to 50% of its own bodyweight, and the size of their prey allows them to feed rarely and opportunistically while maximizing energetic efficiency. This is consistent with the observation that only individuals under 120 mm in length were found with crustaceans in their stomach contents. The fish is considered a specialist predator given the small list of prey that were observed in the stomach content analysis. Some examples of nektonic prey include Cyclothone, Bregmaceros, Diaphus, Lampanyctus, and Myctophum. In a study to determine the effect of seasonal changes on feeding behavior, no significant difference was determined for C. sloani, and all of the prey items observed were fishes. Earlier research found that of the 28 fish species preyed on, 18 were myctophids. There was no observation of a diurnal feeding pattern, meaning their feeding was not affected by time of day.

== Bioluminescence ==
The photophores on the ventral and lateral sides of the viperfish allow it to display bioluminescence. In a recent study, it was determined that the hormones adrenaline and noradrenaline both contribute to bioluminescence in the viperfish, with adrenaline levels being higher in the photophores. The study also observed that when the tail of the viperfish was squeezed, the viperfish emitted light for about 5–10 seconds.
