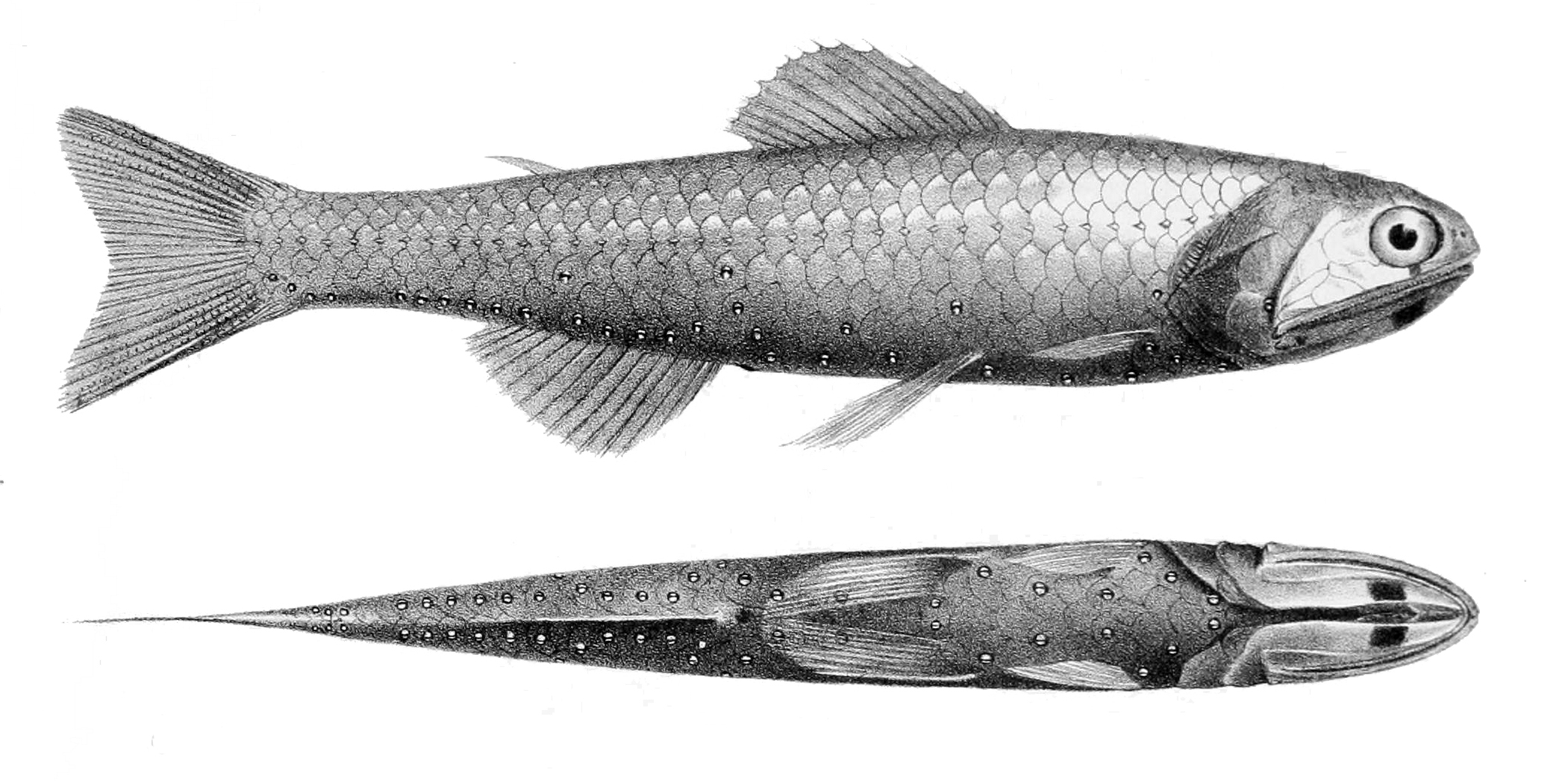

Conservation status
- Least Concern (IUCN 3.1)

Scientific classification
- Kingdom: Animalia
- Phylum: Chordata
- Class: Actinopterygii
- Order: Myctophiformes
- Family: Myctophidae
- Genus: Diaphus
- Species: D. coeruleus

Binomial name
- Diaphus coeruleus (Klunzinger, 1871)

Synonyms
- Scopelus coeruleus Klunzinger, 1871; Diaphus caeruleus (Klunzinger, 1871); Myctophum caeruleum (Klunzinger, 1871); Myctophum caerulum (Klunzinger, 1871)

= Diaphus coeruleus =

Species of fish

Diaphus coeruleus, the blue lantern fish, is a species of lanternfish found in the Indo-West Pacific.

== Description ==
This species reaches a length of 13.7 cm (5.4 in).
