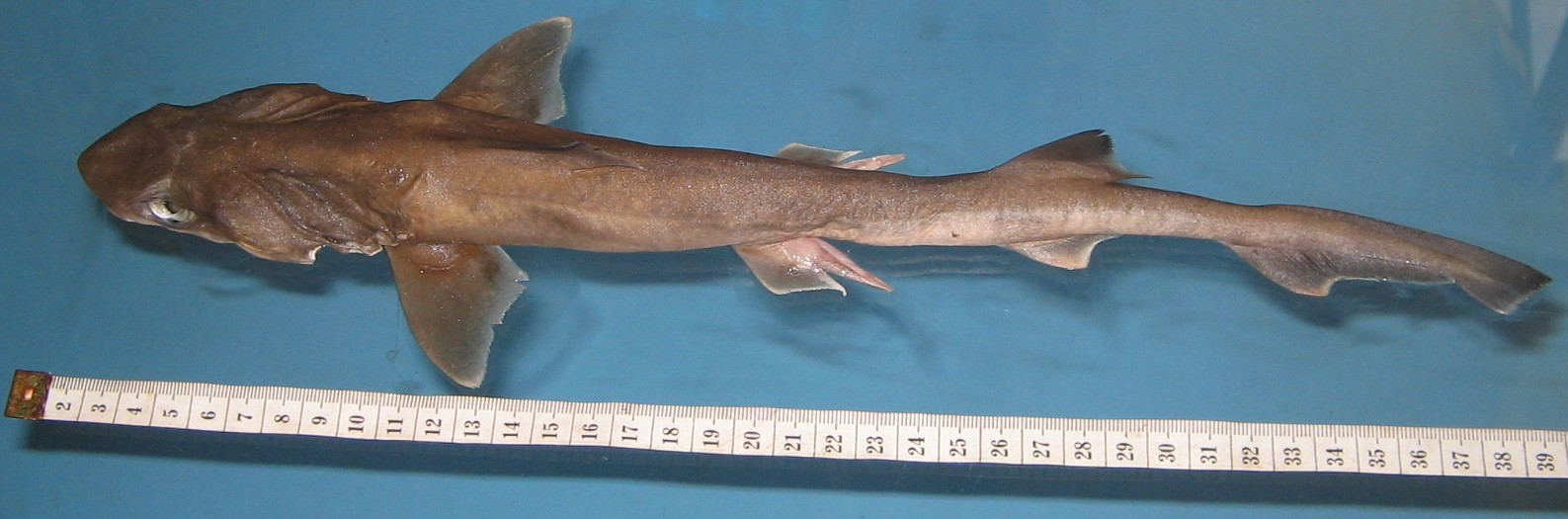

Conservation status
- Least Concern (IUCN 3.1)

Scientific classification
- Kingdom: Animalia
- Phylum: Chordata
- Class: Chondrichthyes
- Subclass: Elasmobranchii
- Division: Selachii
- Order: Carcharhiniformes
- Family: Triakidae
- Genus: Iago
- Species: I. omanensis

Binomial name
- Iago omanensis (Norman, 1939)
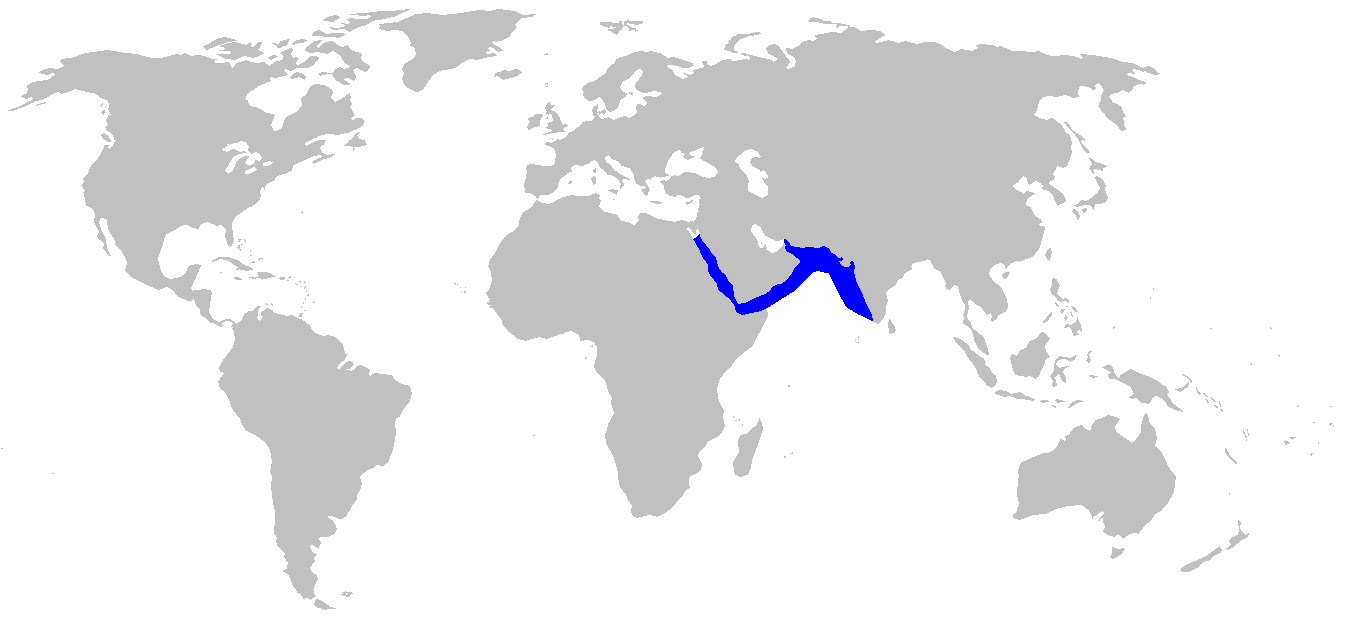
- Range of the bigeye houndshark

Synonyms
- Eugaleus omanensis Norman, 1939

= Bigeye houndshark =

Species of shark

The bigeye houndshark (Iago omanensis) is a species of houndshark, belonging to the family Triakidae. It is a small, placental viviparous shark that is found abundantly in the deep waters of the Gulf of Aqaba, Red Sea. It is described as brown or grey dorsally, with a lighter underside with darker tips on its dorsal and caudal fins. It is found in the deep waters of the continental shelves in the western Indian Ocean, from the Red Sea to southwestern India, between latitudes 30° N and 10° N, at depths between 110 and 2,200 m (360 and 7,220 ft). Its length can vary between males and females, males can be up to 37 cm (15 in), whilst females have been found as large as 58 cm (23 in). Its diet mainly consists of bony fish and squid/cuttlefish
