= Bryx analicarens =

Pink pipefish

Conservation status
- Least Concern (IUCN 3.1)

Scientific classification
- Kingdom: Animalia
- Phylum: Chordata
- Class: Actinopterygii
- Order: Syngnathiformes
- Family: Syngnathidae
- Genus: Bryx
- Species: B. analicarens

Binomial name
- Bryx analicarens Duncker, 1915

Synonyms
- Syngnathus analicarens Duncker, 1915

Species of fish

Bryx analicarens (pink pipefish) is a species of marine fish of the family Syngnathidae. It is found in rocky tidepools and algae to depths of 45 metres (148 ft), in the Indian Ocean, Red Sea, and Persian Gulf. It can grow to lengths of 13 centimetres (5.1 in), and is suspected to feed on benthic and planktonic crustaceans. This species is ovoviviparous, with the males carrying eggs in a brood pouch until they hatch.
