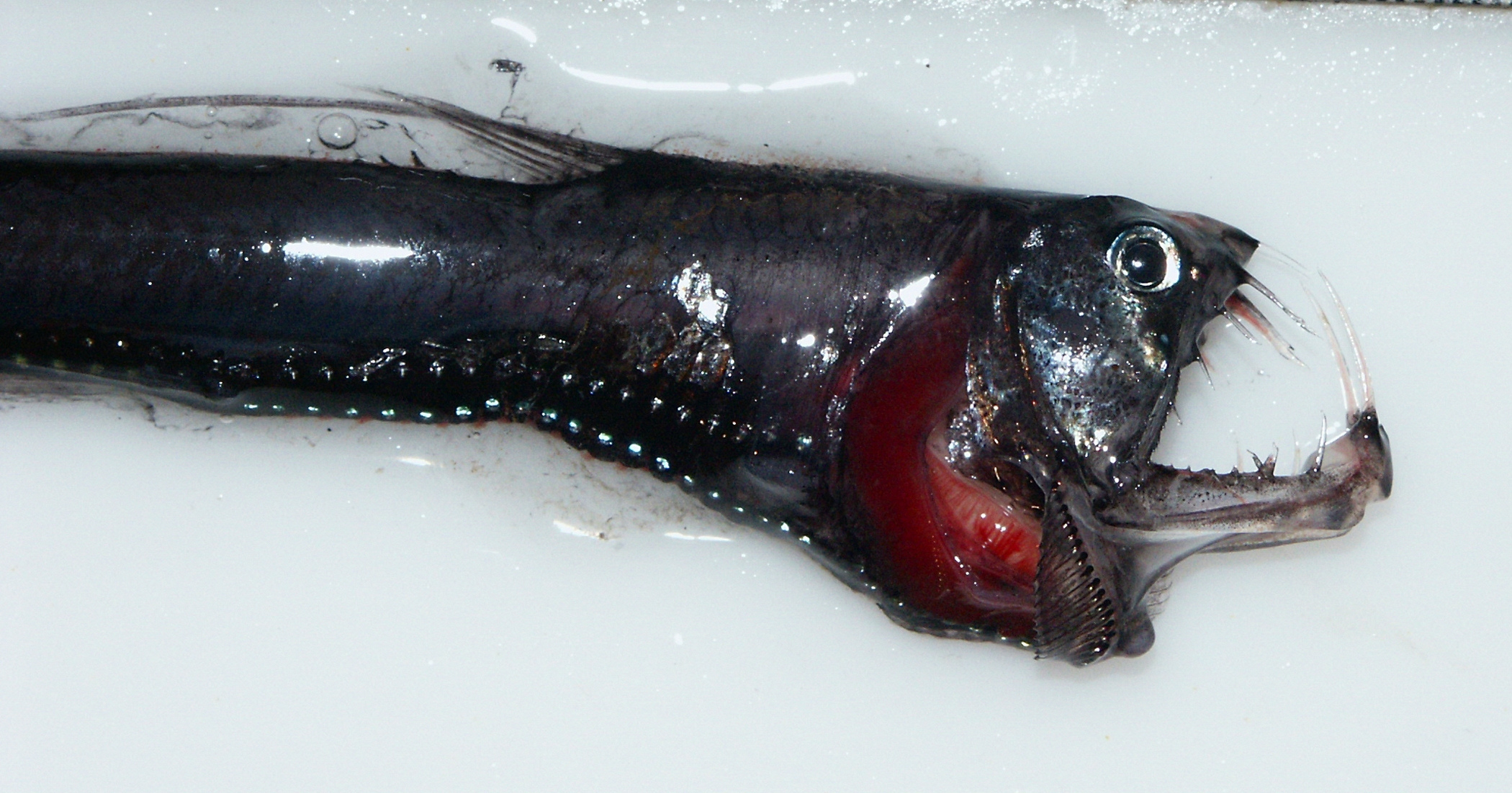

Conservation status
- Least Concern (IUCN 3.1)

Scientific classification
- Kingdom: Animalia
- Phylum: Chordata
- Class: Actinopterygii
- Division: Teleostei
- Order: Stomiiformes
- Family: Stomiidae
- Genus: Chauliodus
- Species: C. macouni

Binomial name
- Chauliodus macouni T. H. Bean, 1890

= Pacific viperfish =

Species of fish

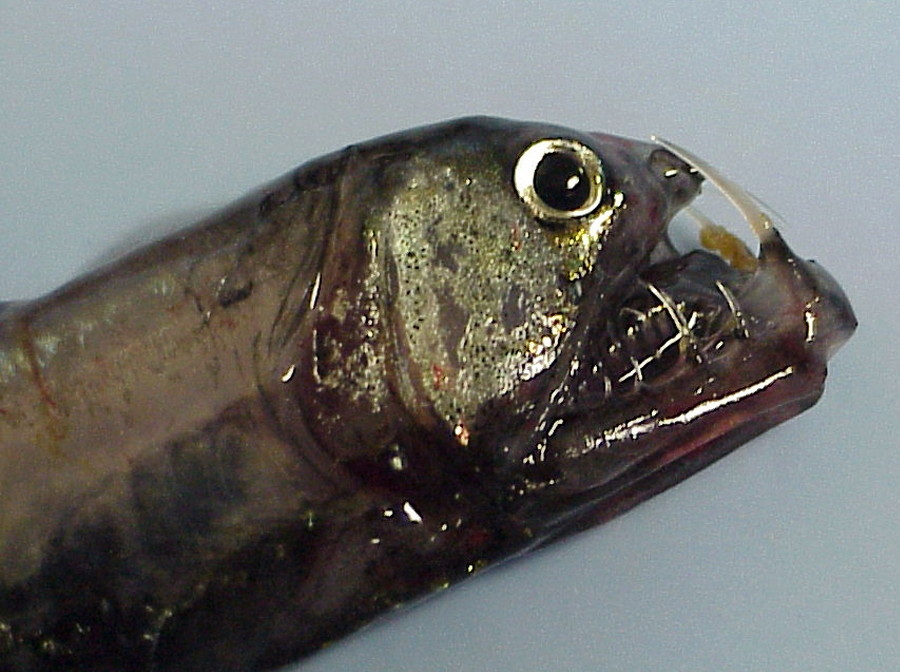
Head of the pacific viperfish

The Pacific viperfish (Chauliodus macouni), is a predatory deep-sea fish found in the North Pacific. It is reported as being either mesopelagic or bathypelagic, with diel vertical migration to shallower waters. The Pacific viperfish is one of the nine different species that belong to the genus Chauliodus, the viperfish. The Pacific viperfish tend to be the largest of the species, typically reaching lengths of up to 1 foot and are considered an example of deep-sea gigantism. The length-weight relationship of the pacific viperfish varies with sex with females tending to be longer and heavier than males.

== Description ==
The pacific viperfish is classified as one of the most ferocious deep seas fish for its size. They are iridescent dark silver-blue color in life with pale fins. They can also be a light black color with blue fins. The coloration of the Pacific viperfish has what is known as ultra-black skin to reduce the reflection of other bioluminescence surrounding them to better camouflage in the deep sea. This ultra black skin reduces the amount of light reflected from the body of the viperfish which scatters the light using the melanosomes in its skin that are optimized for reduced reflectance. Looking at the mouth and curvature of teeth one can easily recognize the pacific viperfish. The fangs of the pacific viper are abnormally long that its jaw is extended out, so its teeth can fit outside of its mouth. The fangs rest near the viper's eyes. These fangs are the viper's way of killing fish, the viper will swim at high speeds at its prey and impale them in the process. The jaw of the Pacific Viperfish is also hinged in order to fit large sized prey for its size. It also has a loosejaw that improves the closing of the jaw by facilitating faster closing to better capture prey that may be harder to catch. Furthermore, its hinged skull allows it to rotate upwards when looking to attack and, ultimately, swallow a large prey. High speed collisions and force in bites have cause the viperfish to adapt to high impact. The vertebrae that is located right behind its head is used a shock absorber, very similar to an air bag. They are excellent maneuvers in areas that receive significantly less sunlight than uppermost regions. This is accredited to a protein in the rods known as rhodopsin, composed of the transmembrane protein opsin, and retinal. The viperfish lacks a swimbladder and has large amounts of acidic glycosaminoglycans in its gelatinous tissue that are hypothesized to be used as a possible buoyancy mechanism.

== Hunting and feeding ==
Pacific Viperfish are also one of the many deep-sea fishes that migrate vertically to feed on fish at night. This feeding mechanism is referred to as diel vertical migration (DVM).

Viperfish are often caught with empty stomachs. The viperfish's diet consists of fish with myctophids and slender fangjaws being their most common prey.

According to O'Day (1973) luminescent silhouetting may aid the fish in mating, spacing themselves out as they hunt, maintaining conspecific aggregations, warning potential predators of their own formidable size, or perhaps allowing them to escape from predators by temporarily blinding them. These functions, however, remain speculative.

The Pacific viperfish has large photophores that are found on the ventral side, as well as the ventrolateral sides, where they create rows. These photophores present themselves in luminous tissue that is evident on the dorsal and ventral portions of the fish, as well as the fins. This luminescence was described as having a "blue color" by a scientist who had the fish in a tank for 45 minutes before it expired. It was further noted that luminescence could be induced by prodding the fish with a glass rod, which would cause the luminescence to pulse through the body of the fish before returning to its static glow in the ventral region. It was further noted that placing the fish in a weak adrenaline-seawater solution caused luminescence to increase (as would applying a topical adrenaline solution or injecting adrenaline intravenously. There is a simple, un-pigmented type of luminescent organ found in these fish that is found within a gelatinous sheath which surrounds the entire body.

The photophore is found on the dorsal fin of the pacific viper. The photophore uses bioluminescence to produce light to entice a victim. The prey is attracted to the flickering light like a fishing lure. Along with the extended photophore on the dorsal fin, the viperfish also carries photophores on side and underneath its body. The lights underneath provide a camouflage to fish from below. The photophore also serves as a communication tool; it is used by the viperfish to signal a mate or ward off potential rivals in the area. The Pacific viper utilizes the low visibility and darkness to its advantage for hunting tactics. The Pacific viper lies motionless in the darkness and waves its blinking lure over its head waiting on its meal to arrive. Their stomach is quite large, and they have low basal metabolic rates which enables them to go days without food and store up on food. They're composed of many light organs. Specifically, one of their light organs is found on a long dorsal fin which acts as a lure for when searching for prey. Their light organs allow them to attract prey and warn other viperfish of danger.

== Reproduction and ontogeny ==
Little is known on Pacific viperfish reproductions due to the depths it lives at. Due to darkness and limited mates it is best suited that the Pacific viper externally spawn (biology) or oviparous. Females will release eggs into the water which the male will fertilize. The number of eggs and larvae produced by the female is determined by the temperature of the water and concentration of salt. Spawning is believed to occur year-round but with spikes of young larvae during January and March. When an offspring is born it is about six millimeters long. Offspring's are expected to defend themselves until they are mature.

The first two vertebral centra of the Pacific viperfish are replaced with the first epineural and cartilage within connective tissue. The enlarged first epineural ossification is pointed dorsally in both larval and adult fishes. The epural chondrocytes appear and develop after caudal fin flexion has occurred in development.

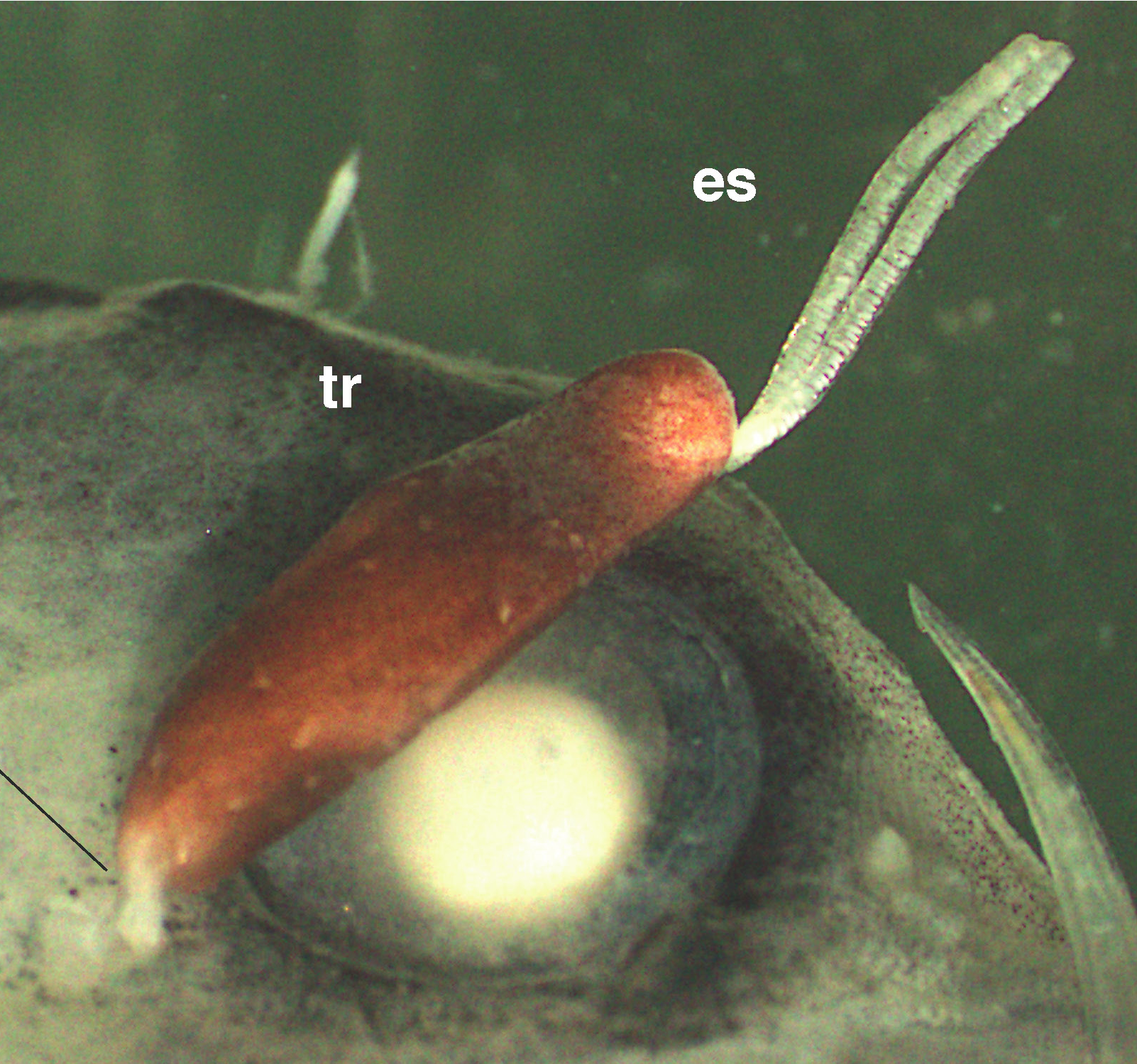
Parasite on the Pacific viperfish

== Parasites ==
The Pacific viperfish has one documented parasite. In 2018, Susumu Ohtsuka, Dhugal J. Lindsay and Kunihiko Izawa described a new genus and species of pennellid copepod, Protosarcotretes nishikawai, from a single ovigerous female infecting a Pacific viperfish collected from the deep-waters of Suruga Bay, Japan. According to the authors, the new genus had the most plesiomorphic states in the first to fourth legs of pennellid copepods. The discovered a parasite attached to the posterior to the right eye of the host fish, and this discovery marked the only documented case of this species.

== Captivity ==
Viperfish are not an endangered species, but they are preyed on by some dolphin and shark species. They are also unable to live in captivity because of the extreme pressure differences within the environment. Pacific viperfish have been recorded living from 15 to 40 years in their natural habitat. A few species have been captured, but only lasted a couple hours before dying.
