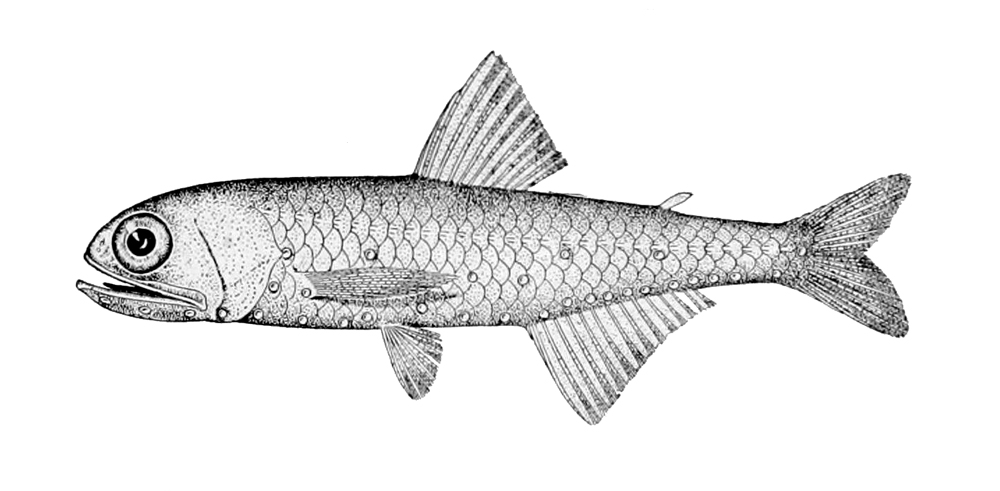

Conservation status
- Least Concern (IUCN 3.1)

Scientific classification
- Kingdom: Animalia
- Phylum: Chordata
- Class: Actinopterygii
- Order: Myctophiformes
- Family: Myctophidae
- Genus: Benthosema
- Species: B. pterotum

Binomial name
- Benthosema pterotum (Alcock, 1890)

= Benthosema pterotum =

Species of fish

Benthosema pterotum, also known as the skinnycheek lanternfish and opaline lanternfish, is a species of fish in the family Myctophidae. It is found in the Indian Ocean and western Pacific Ocean. It is dominant species in the mesopelagic of the Red Sea and the Gulf of Aden. It is a minor fishery species.

Benthosema pterotum grows to 7 cm (2.8 in) total length.
