= Blunt-tooth conger =

Conservation status
- Least Concern (IUCN 3.1)

Scientific classification
- Kingdom: Animalia
- Phylum: Chordata
- Class: Actinopterygii
- Order: Anguilliformes
- Family: Congridae
- Genus: Ariosoma
- Species: A. mauritianum

Binomial name
- Ariosoma mauritianum (Pappenheim, 1914)

Synonyms
- Leptocephalus mauritianus Pappenheim, 1914; Leptocephalus mauritianum Pappenheim, 1914 (misspelling)

Species of fish

The blunt-tooth conger (Ariosoma mauritianum) is an eel in the family Congridae (conger/garden eels). It was described by Paul Pappenheim in 1914, originally under the genus Leptocephalus. It is a marine, deep-water dwelling eel which is known from the Indo-West Pacific, including the Red Sea, eastern Africa, and Australia. It is known to dwell at a depth range of 360–800 metres. Males can reach a maximum total length of 30 centimetres (12 in; 0.98 ft).
