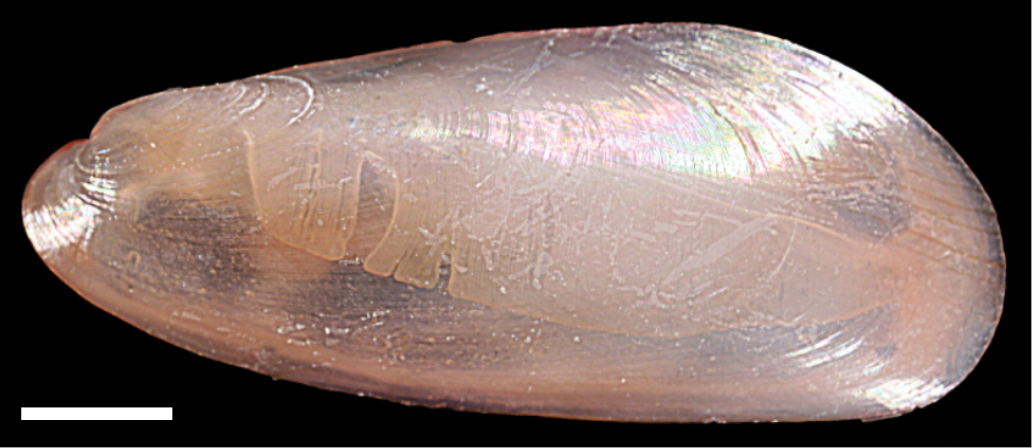
- Arcuatula perfragilis

Scientific classification
- Kingdom: Animalia
- Phylum: Mollusca
- Class: Bivalvia
- Order: Mytilida
- Family: Mytilidae
- Genus: Arcuatula
- Species: A. perfragilis

Binomial name
- Arcuatula perfragilis (Dunker), 1857)

Synonyms
- Modiola angusta Clessin, 1890; Modiolus perfragilis (Dunker, 1857); Musculista perfragilis (Dunker, 1857); Musculus perfragilis (Dunker, 1857); Volsella perfragilis Dunker, 1857

= Arcuatula perfragilis =

Species of bivalve

Arcuatula perfragilis is a bivalve mollusc of the mussel family, Mytilidae, which has an Indo-Pacific distribution including the Red Sea. It has invaded the eastern Mediterranean from the Red Sea by way of the Suez Canal, a process known as Lessepsian migration.

== Description ==
Arcuatula perfragilis has a pale green, equivalve shell with a few yellowish radial lines on the dorsal to posterior portion of the valves. The valves are typical mussel-shaped in that they are narrowly ovoid and transversely elongated. The periostracum is shiny. The surface of the valve has a very weak pattern of radiating lines which is discernible only by the strong ligament along the hinge line typical of the family mytilidae. This hinge has between 1 and 5 small dysodont teeth at the anterior end with a further15 towards the posterior part beyond the ligament. The shell length is normally 20mm.

It can be identified from Arcuatula senhousia in the Mediterranean by its having a darker, less shiny, more rounded shell and because it possesses less distinct, fewer, smaller riblets anterior to the umbones.

== Distribution ==
Arcuatula perfragilis has an Indo-Pacific distribution and occurs from the Red Sea east to Japan. It was first recorded in the Mediterranean off Israel in 1960 but was initially misidentified as Arcuatula glaberrima (then named as Modiolus glabberrimus), it has now spread as far as Turkey.

== Biology ==
Arcuatula perfragilis is a benthic species which usually occurs in shallow water between 0-30m on intertidal mud and sand.

== Taxonomy ==
Arcuatula perfragilis is the type species of the genus Arcuatula.
