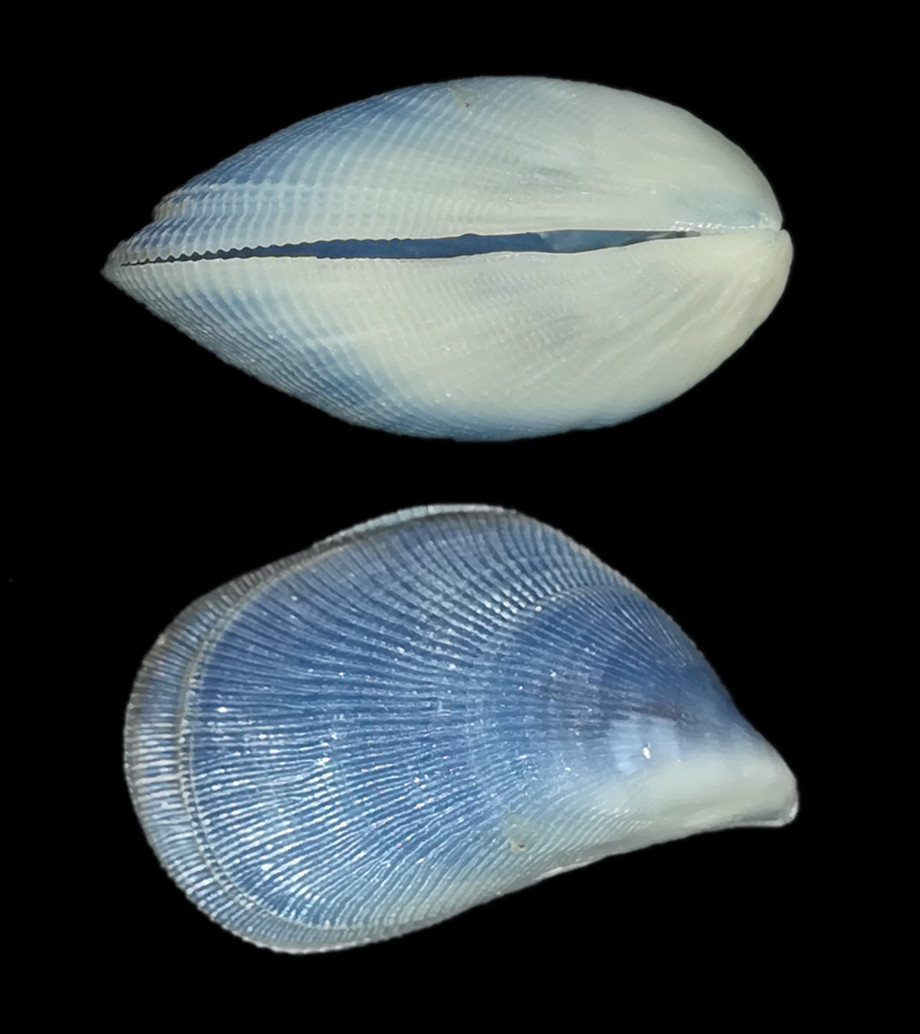
- Septifer bilocularis

Scientific classification
- Kingdom: Animalia
- Phylum: Mollusca
- Class: Bivalvia
- Order: Mytilida
- Superfamily: Mytiloidea
- Family: Mytilidae
- Genus: Septifer
- Species: S. bilocularis

Binomial name
- Septifer bilocularis (Linnaeus, 1758)

Synonyms
- Modiola subtriangularis W. H. Turton, 1932 (junior synonym); Mytilus bilocularis Linnaeus, 1758; Mytilus nicobaricus Röding, 1798; Mytilus septulifer Menke, 1830; Tichogonia bilocularis (Linnaeus, 1758); Tichogonia kraussii Küster, 1841; Tichogonia wiegmannii Küster, 1841

= Septifer bilocularis =

Species of mollusc

Septifer bilocularis is a marine bivalve species in the family Mytilidae, the mussels.

Right and left valve of the same specimen:

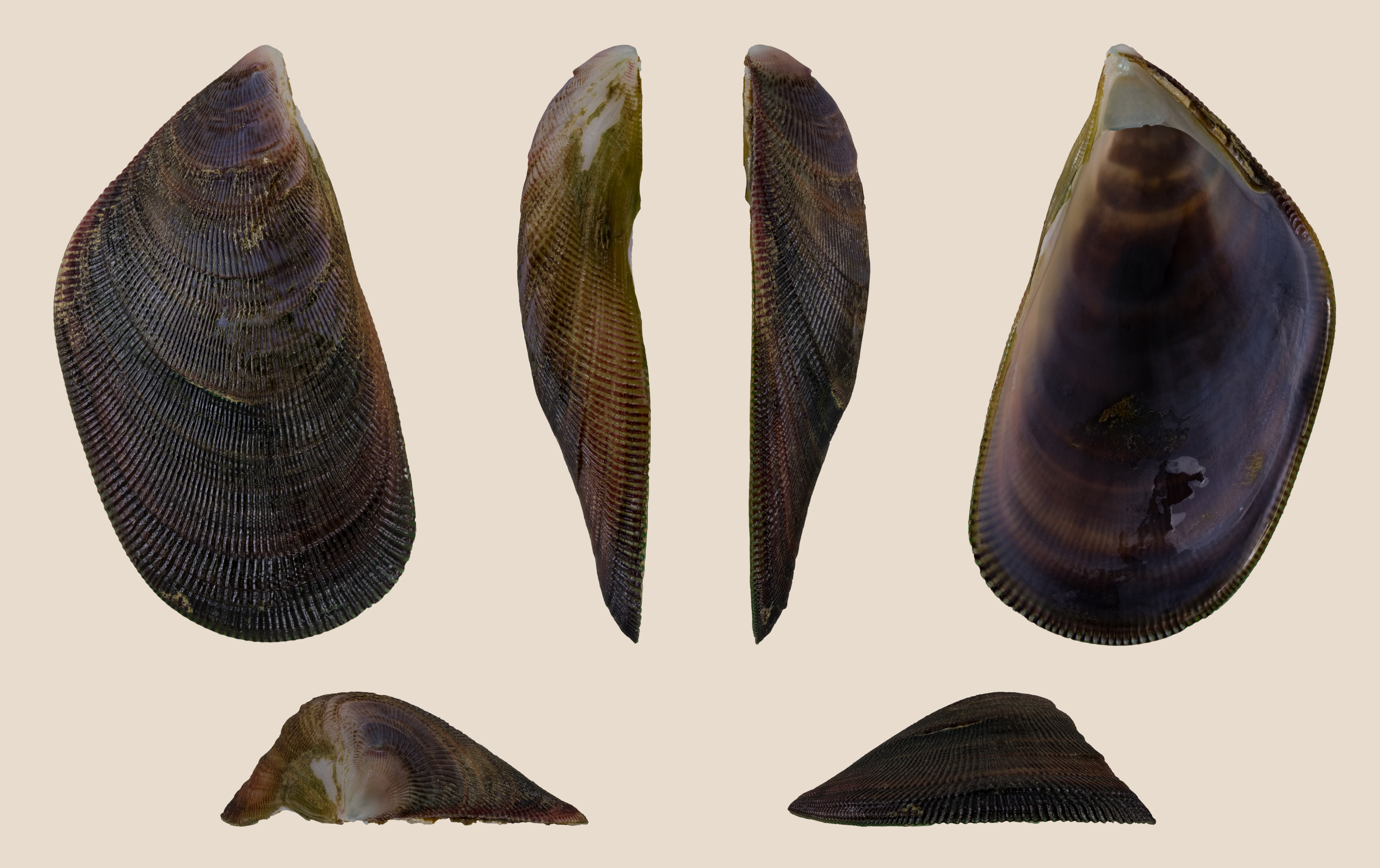
Right valve

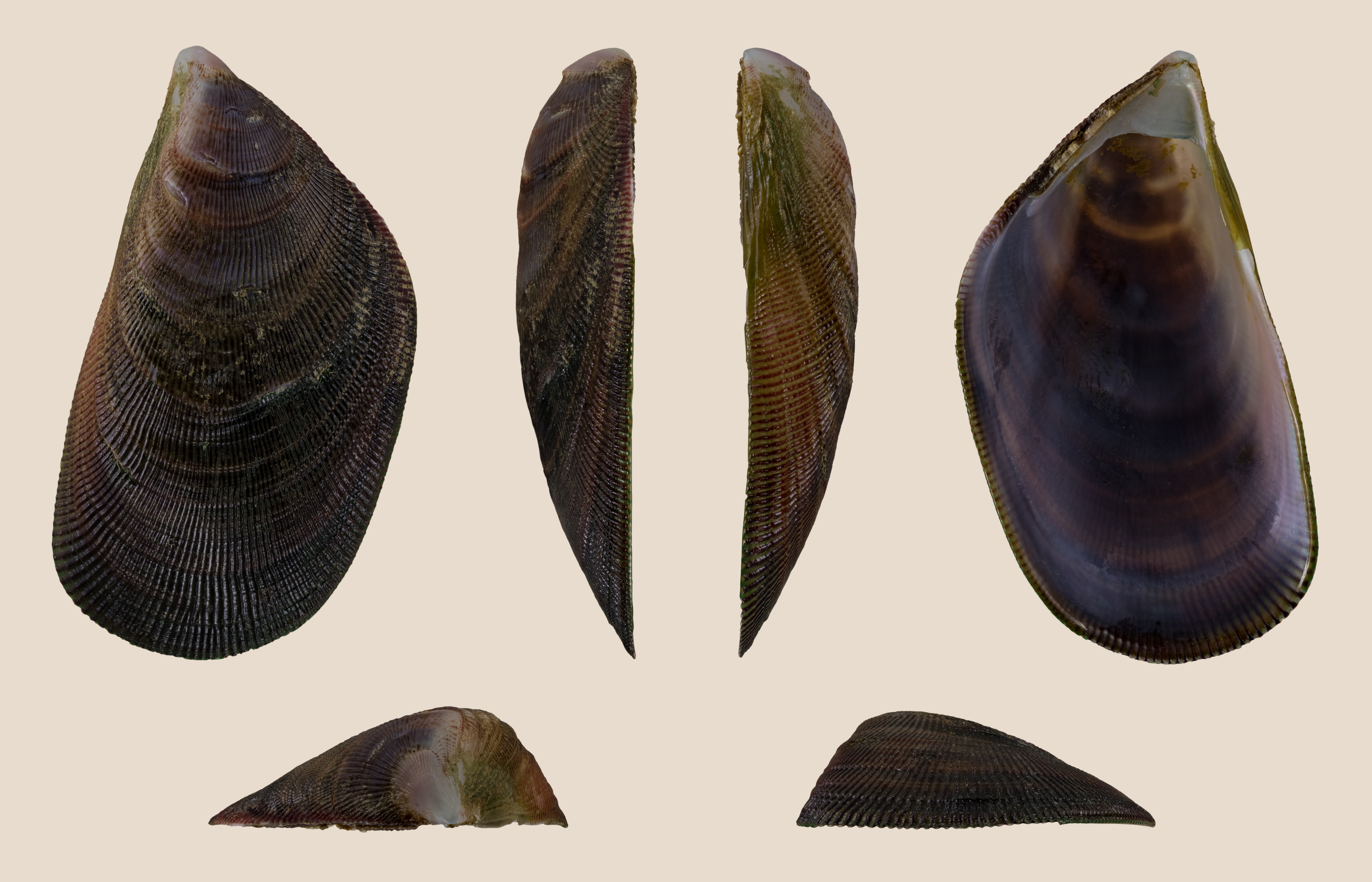
Left valve

== Distribution ==
Tropical Indo-Pacific.; also in Australia.
