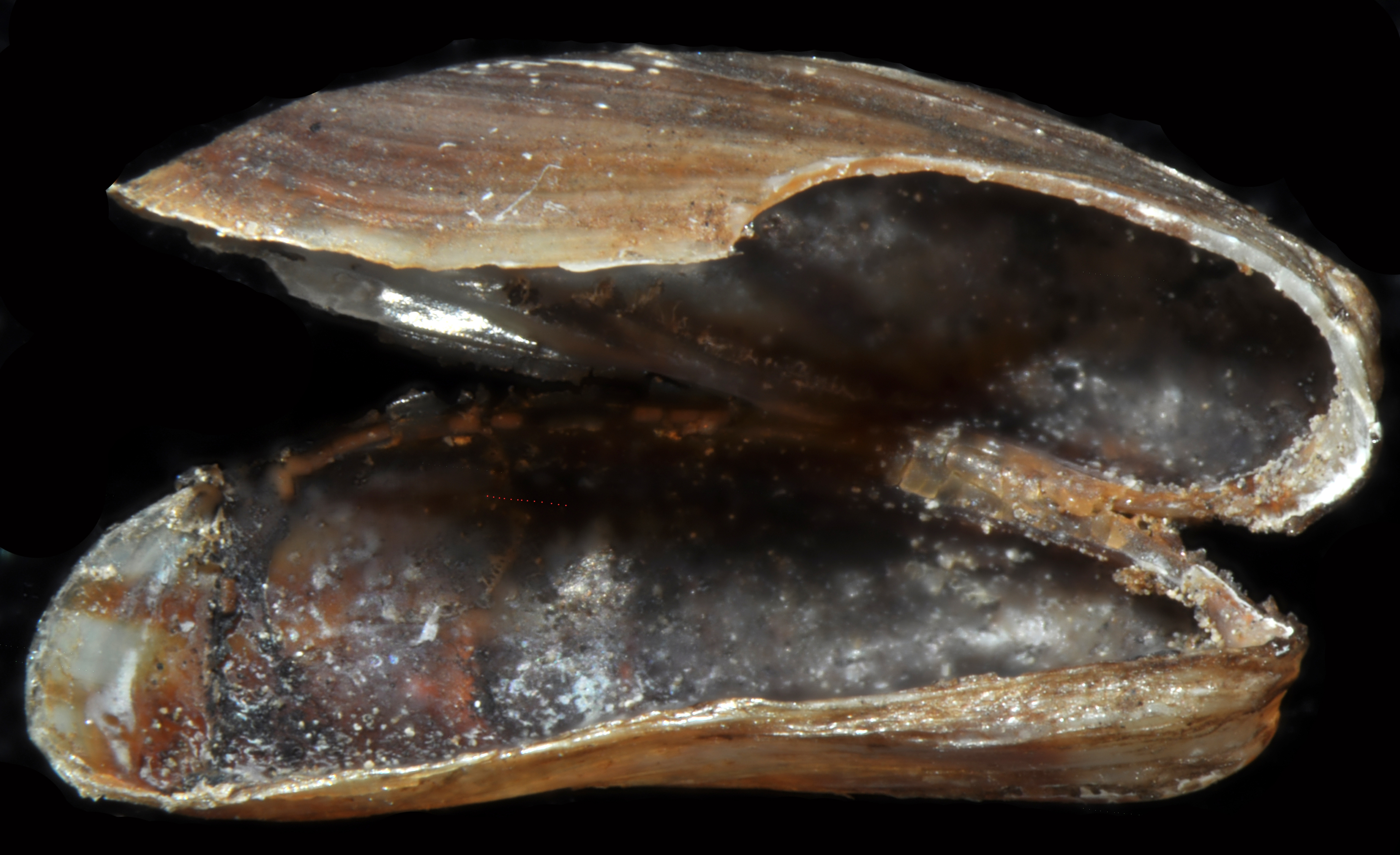
- Shell of Xenostrobus pulex (syntype at MNHN, Paris)

Scientific classification
- Kingdom: Animalia
- Phylum: Mollusca
- Class: Bivalvia
- Order: Mytilida
- Superfamily: Mytiloidea
- Family: Mytilidae
- Genus: Xenostrobus; B. R. Wilson, 1967

Type species
- Volsella inconstans Dunker, 1856

= Xenostrobus =

Genus of bivalves

Xenostrobus is a genus of saltwater, brackish water and freshwater bivalve molluscs in the subfamily Xenostrobinae of the family Mytilidae, the mussels.

== Species ==
- † Xenostrobus altijugatus (Marwick, 1931)
- Xenostrobus balani Ockelmann, 1983
- Xenostrobus huttoni (Suter, 1914)
- Xenostrobus inconstans (Dunker, 1856)
- Xenostrobus neozelanicus (Iredale, 1915)
- Xenostrobus pulex (Lamarck, 1819)
- Xenostrobus sambasensis (Dautzenberg, 1903)
- Xenostrobus securis (Lamarck, 1819)

Synonyms

- Xenostrobus atrata [sic]: synonym of Xenostrobus atratus (Lischke, 1871): synonym of Vignadula atrata (Lischke, 1871) (incorrect gender ending)
- Xenostrobus atratus (Lischke, 1871): synonym of Vignadula atrata (Lischke, 1871) (superseded combination)
- Xenostrobus mangle Ockelmann, 1983: synonym of Vignadula mangle (Ockelmann, 1983) (superseded combination, original combination)
