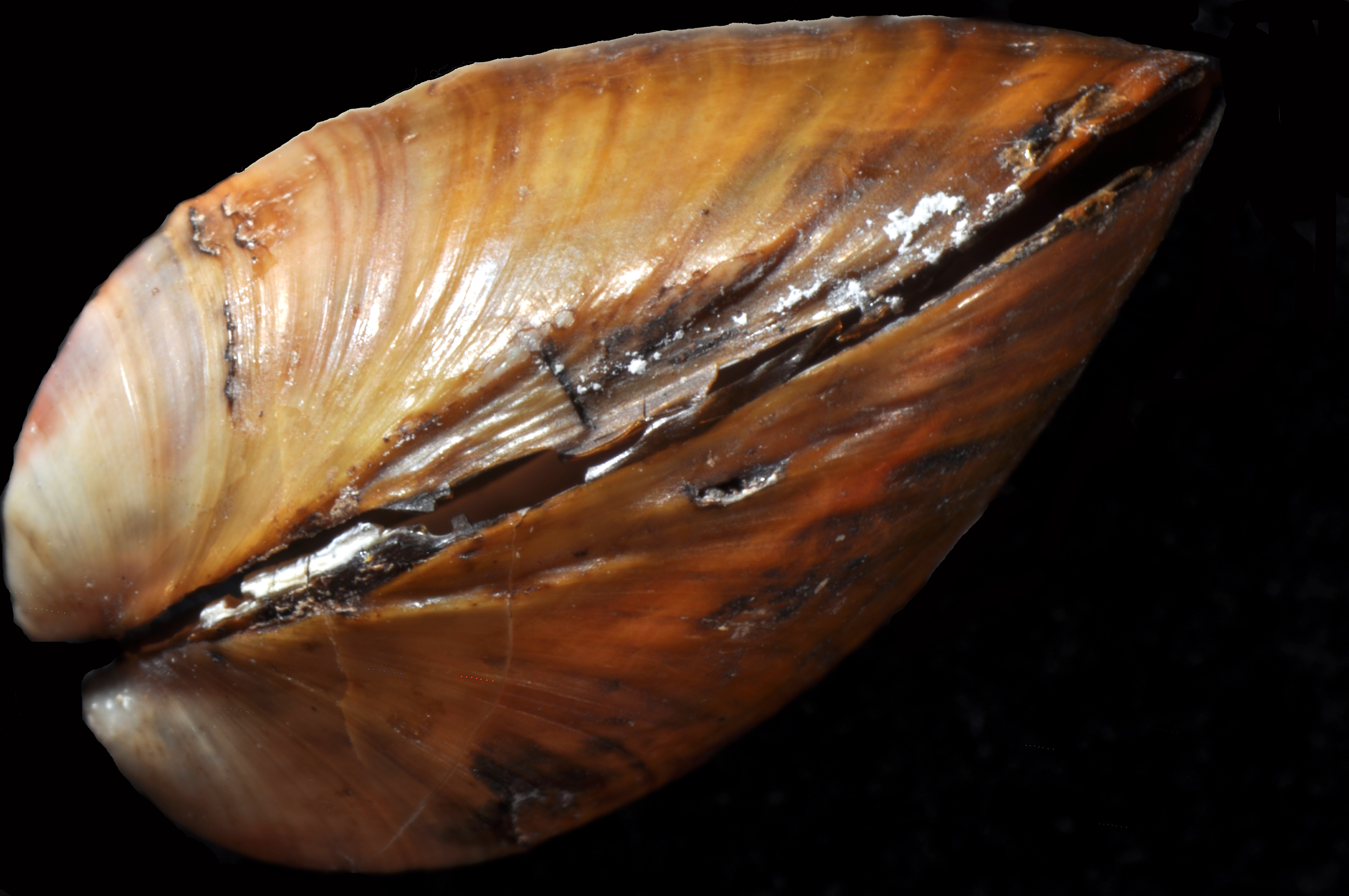
- Shell of Sinomytilus harmandi (syntype at MNHN, Paris)

Scientific classification
- Domain: Eukaryota
- Kingdom: Animalia
- Phylum: Mollusca
- Class: Bivalvia
- Order: Mytilida
- Superfamily: Mytiloidea
- Family: Mytilidae
- Genus: Sinomytilus; Thiele, 1934

Type species
- Dreissensia crosseana Morlet, 1885

Synonyms
- Mytilus (Sinomytilus) Thiele, 1934 (original rank)

= Sinomytilus =

Genus of bivalves

Sinomytilus is a genus of saltwater, brackish water and freshwater clams, marine bivalve molluscs in the subfamily Septiferinae of the family Mytilidae, the mussels.

== Species ==
- Sinomytilus harmandi (Rochebrune, 1882)
- Sinomytilus morrisoni Brandt, 1974
- Sinomytilus swinhoei (H. Adams, 1870)
