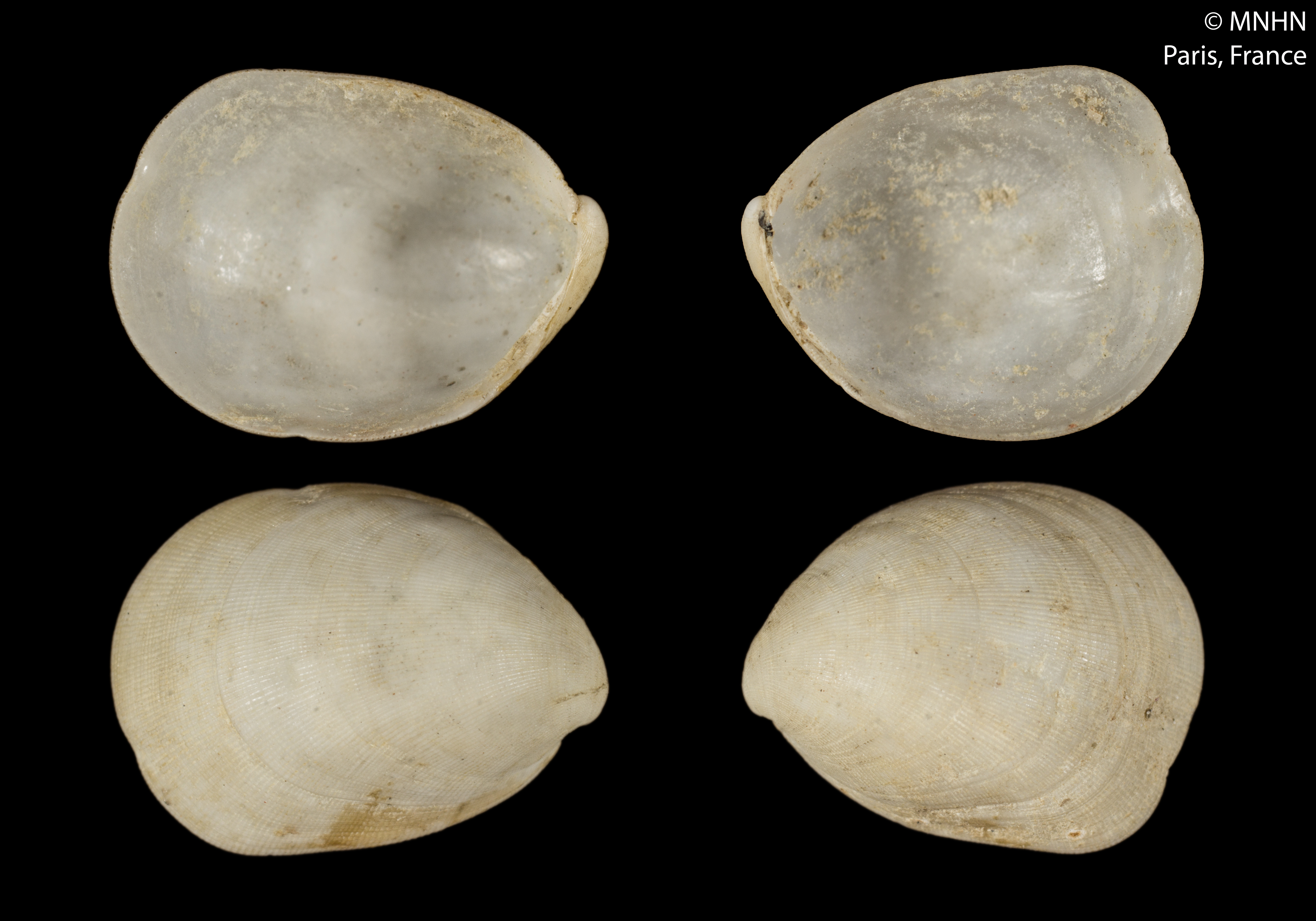
- Shell of Solamen dollfusi (specimen at MNHN, Paris)

Scientific classification
- Domain: Eukaryota
- Kingdom: Animalia
- Phylum: Mollusca
- Class: Bivalvia
- Order: Mytilida
- Superfamily: Mytiloidea
- Family: Mytilidae
- Genus: Solamen; Iredale, 1924

Type species
- Solamen rex Iredale, 1924

Synonyms
- Megacrenella Habe & Ka. Ito, 1965

= Solamen =

Genus of bivalves

Solamen is a genus of saltwater, brackish water and freshwater clams, marine bivalve molluscs in the subfamily Crenellinae of the family Mytilidae, the mussels.

== Species ==
- Solamen bulla (Dunker, 1857)
- Solamen columbianum (Dall, 1897)
- Solamen dollfusi (Dautzenberg, 1910)
- Solamen glandula (Totten, 1834)
- Solamen leanum (Dall, 1897)
- Solamen megas (Dall, 1902)
- Solamen persicum (E. A. Smith, 1906)
- Solamen recens (Tate, 1897)
- Solamen spectabile (A. Adams, 1862)
- Solamen striatissimum (G. B. Sowerby III, 1904)
