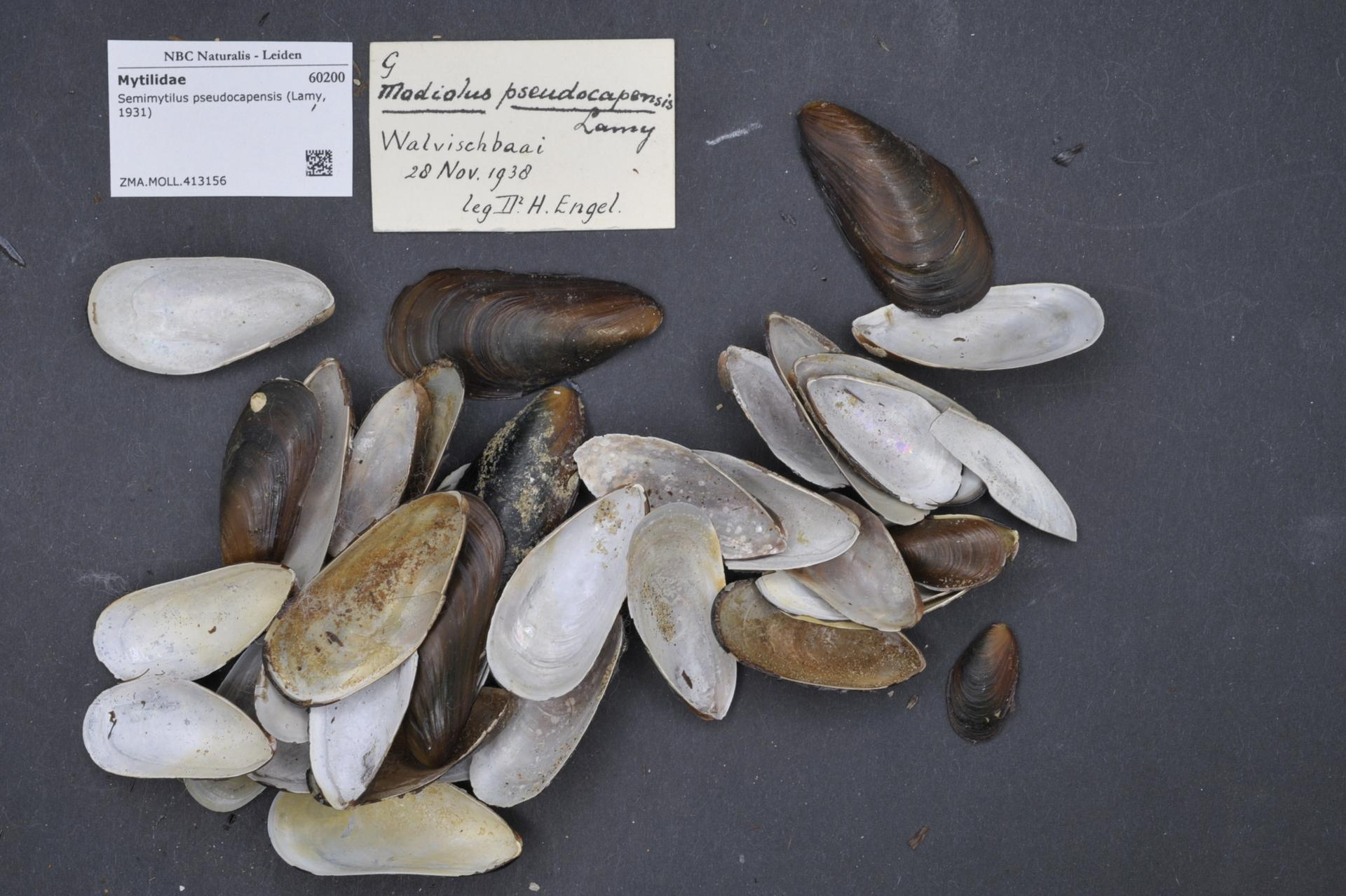

Scientific classification
- Kingdom: Animalia
- Phylum: Mollusca
- Class: Bivalvia
- Order: Mytilida
- Family: Mytilidae
- Genus: Semimytilus
- Species: S. pseudocapensis

Binomial name
- Semimytilus pseudocapensis (Lamy, 1931)

Synonyms
- Semimytilus patagonicus (Hanley, 1843); Modiola pseudocapensis E. Lamy, 1931

= Semimytilus pseudocapensis =

Species of mussel

Semimytilus pseudocapensis is a species of bivalve in the family Mytilidae. The scientific name of the species was first validly published in 1931 by Lamy.
