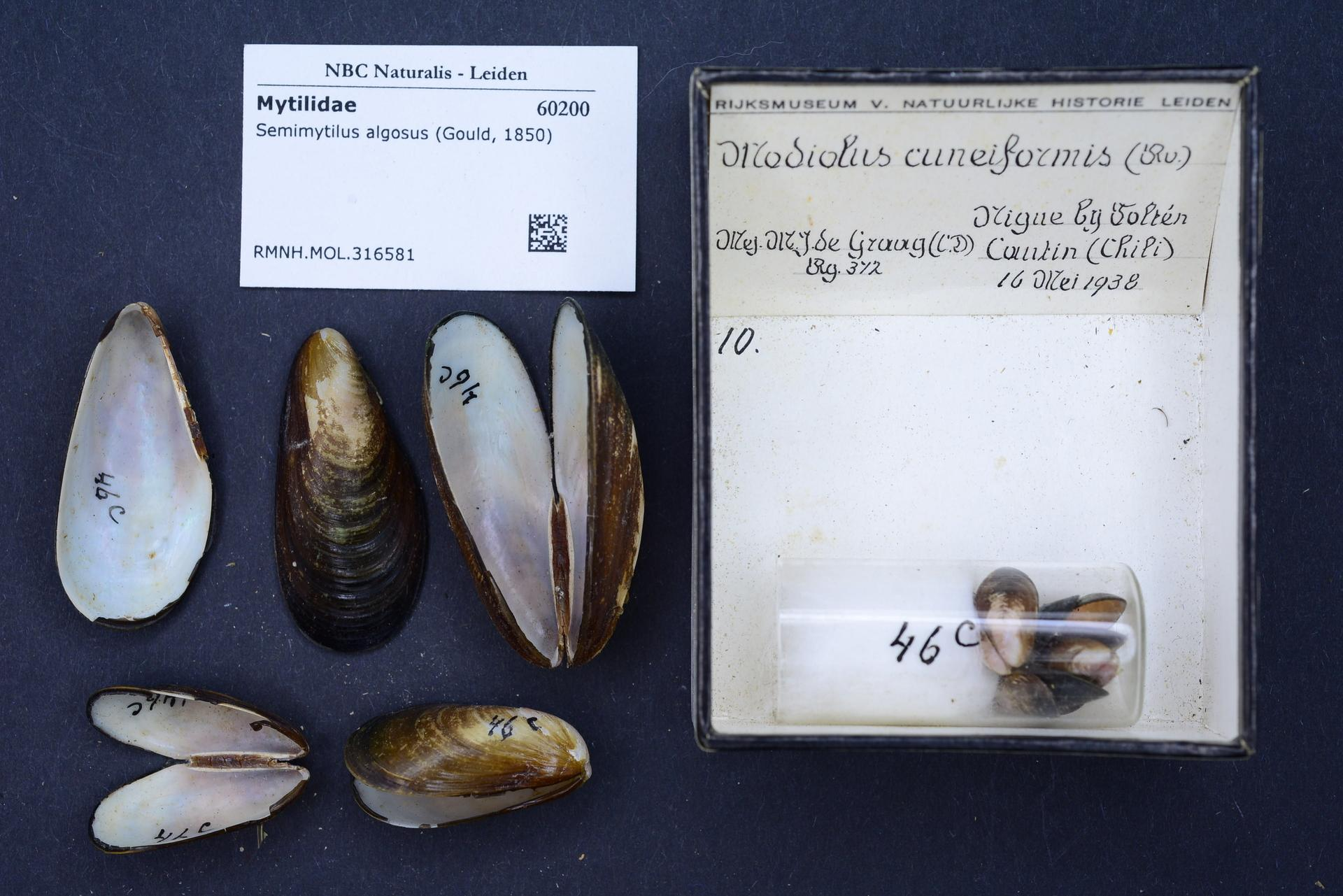

Scientific classification
- Kingdom: Animalia
- Phylum: Mollusca
- Class: Bivalvia
- Order: Mytilida
- Family: Mytilidae
- Genus: Semimytilus
- Species: S. algosus

Binomial name
- Semimytilus algosus (Gould, 1850)

Synonyms
- Modiolus nonuranus; Mytilus algosus; Mytilus similis

= Semimytilus algosus =

Species of mussel

Semimytilus algosus is a species of mussels. A common name for this species is Dwarf mussel. It is the first species where trioecy was reported in the phylum Mollusca.

== Size ==
Individuals can be up to 42 or 50 millimetres (1.7 or 2.0 in) in size.

== Reproduction ==
In the past this species was described as simultaneous hermaphroditic but it was later confirmed the species is trioecious. It is believed this species evolved from a gonochoric ancestor.

== Occurrence ==
Its habitat is rocky shores. The species has been found off the coasts of South Africa and is native to Chile. The species is also invasive off the coast of Angola and Namibia.
