= Arcuatula variegata =

Scientific classification
- Kingdom: Animalia
- Phylum: Mollusca
- Class: Bivalvia
- Order: Mytilida
- Family: Mytilidae
- Genus: Arcuatula
- Species: A. variegata

Binomial name
- Arcuatula variegata (Benson, 1856)

Synonyms
- Modiola variegata W. H. Benson, 1855

Species of bivalve

Arcuatula variegata is a species of bivalve in the family Mytilidae. The scientific name of the species was first validly published in 1856 by W. H. Benson.
