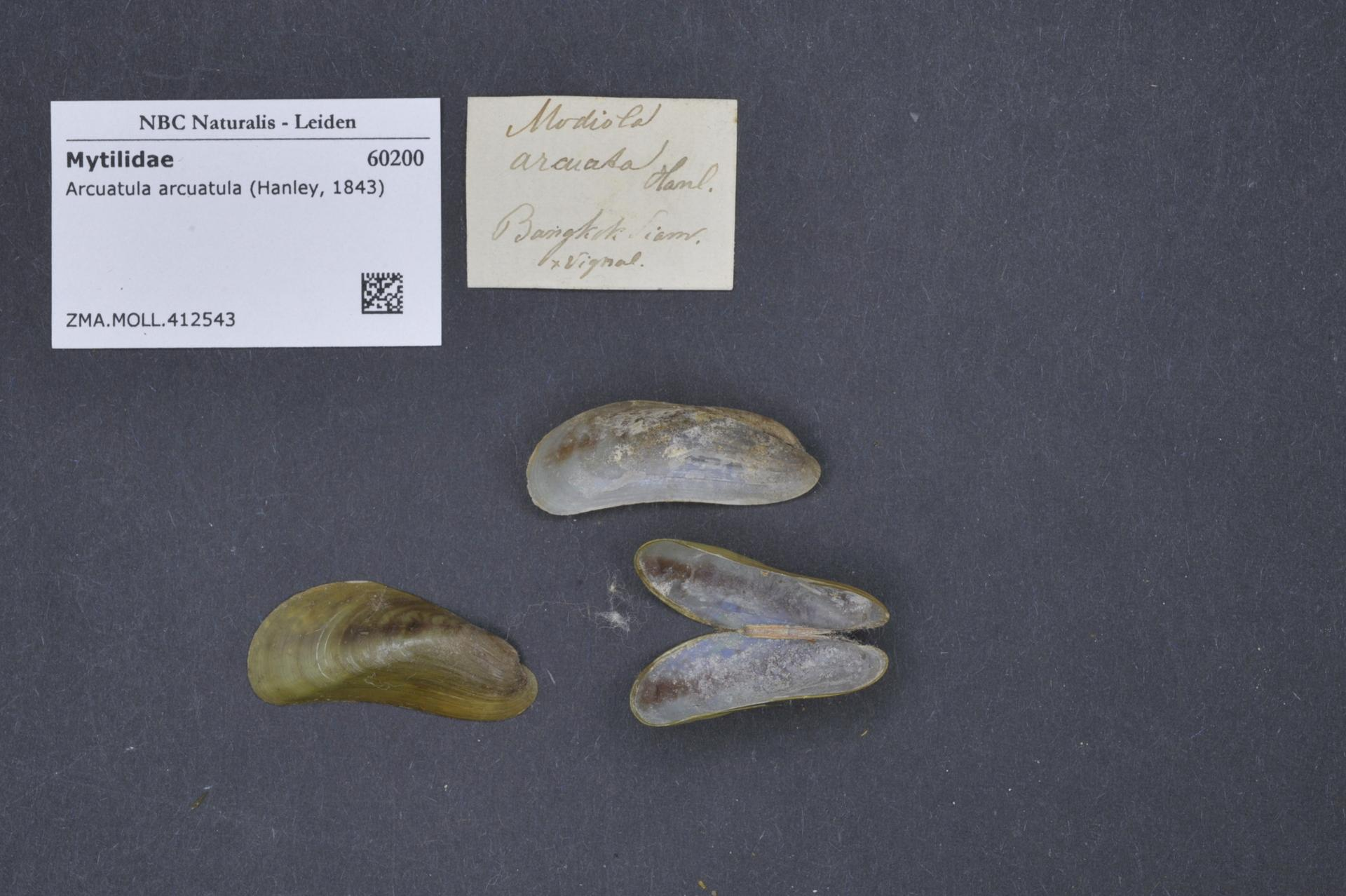

Scientific classification
- Kingdom: Animalia
- Phylum: Mollusca
- Class: Bivalvia
- Order: Mytilida
- Family: Mytilidae
- Genus: Arcuatula
- Species: A. arcuatula

Binomial name
- Arcuatula arcuatula (Hanley, 1844)

Synonyms
- Modiola arcuatula Hanley, 1844

= Arcuatula arcuatula =

Species of bivalve

Arcuatula arcuatula, the arcuate mussel, is a species of bivalve in the family Mytilidae. The scientific name of the species was first validly published in 1844 by Hanley.
