= Gregariella coralliophaga =

Scientific classification
- Kingdom: Animalia
- Phylum: Mollusca
- Class: Bivalvia
- Order: Mytilida
- Family: Mytilidae
- Genus: Gregariella
- Species: G. coralliophaga

Binomial name
- Gregariella coralliophaga (Gmelin, 1791)

Species of bivalve

Gregariella coralliophaga, or the Artist's mussel, is a species of bivalve mollusc in the family Mytilidae. It can be found along the Atlantic coast of North America, ranging from North Carolina to the West Indies.
