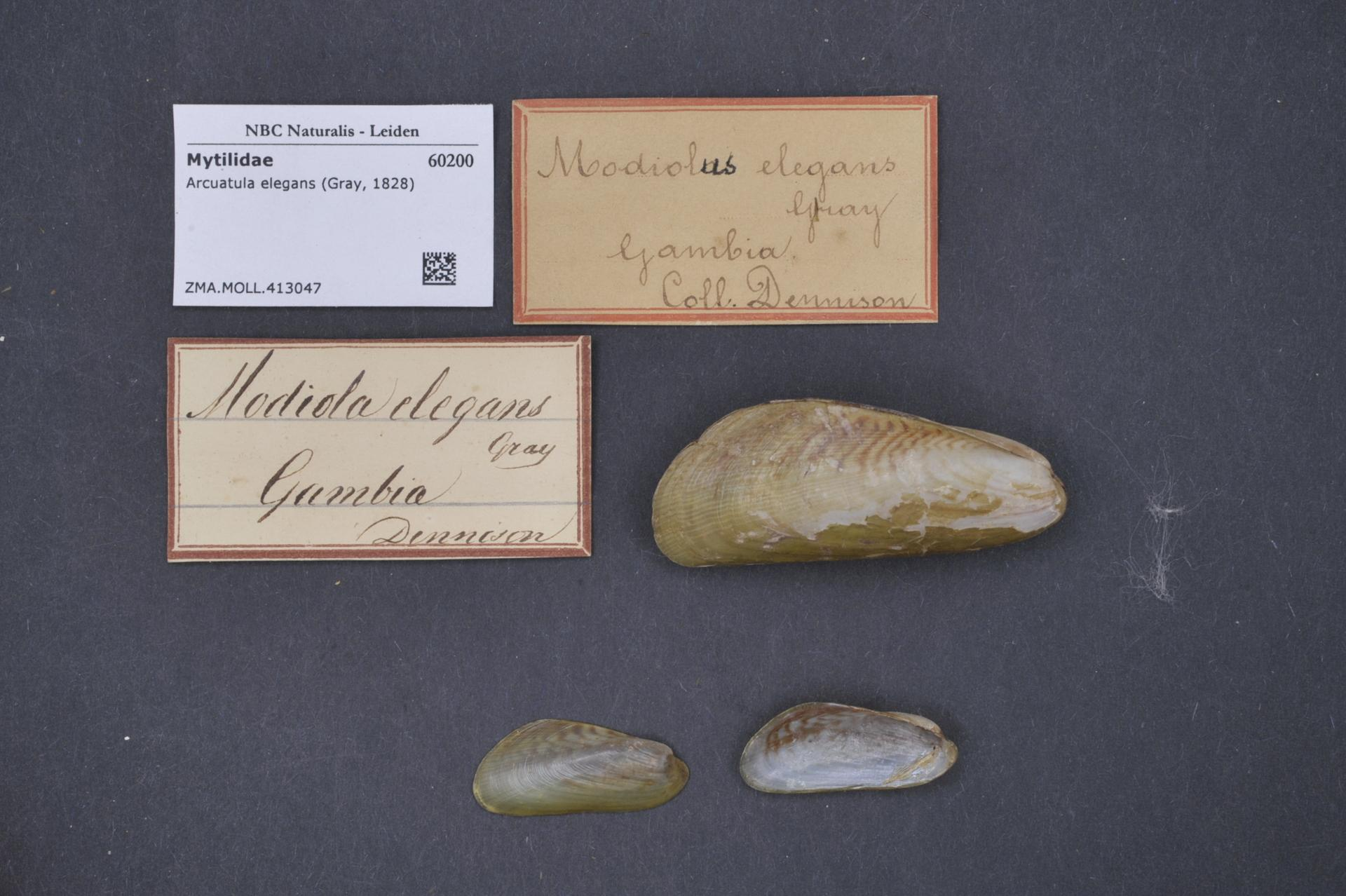

Scientific classification
- Kingdom: Animalia
- Phylum: Mollusca
- Class: Bivalvia
- Order: Mytilida
- Family: Mytilidae
- Genus: Arcuatula
- Species: A. elegans

Binomial name
- Arcuatula elegans (Gray, 1828)

= Arcuatula elegans =

Species of bivalve

Arcuatula elegans is a species of bivalve in the family Mytilidae. The scientific name of the species was first validly published in 1828 by Gray.
