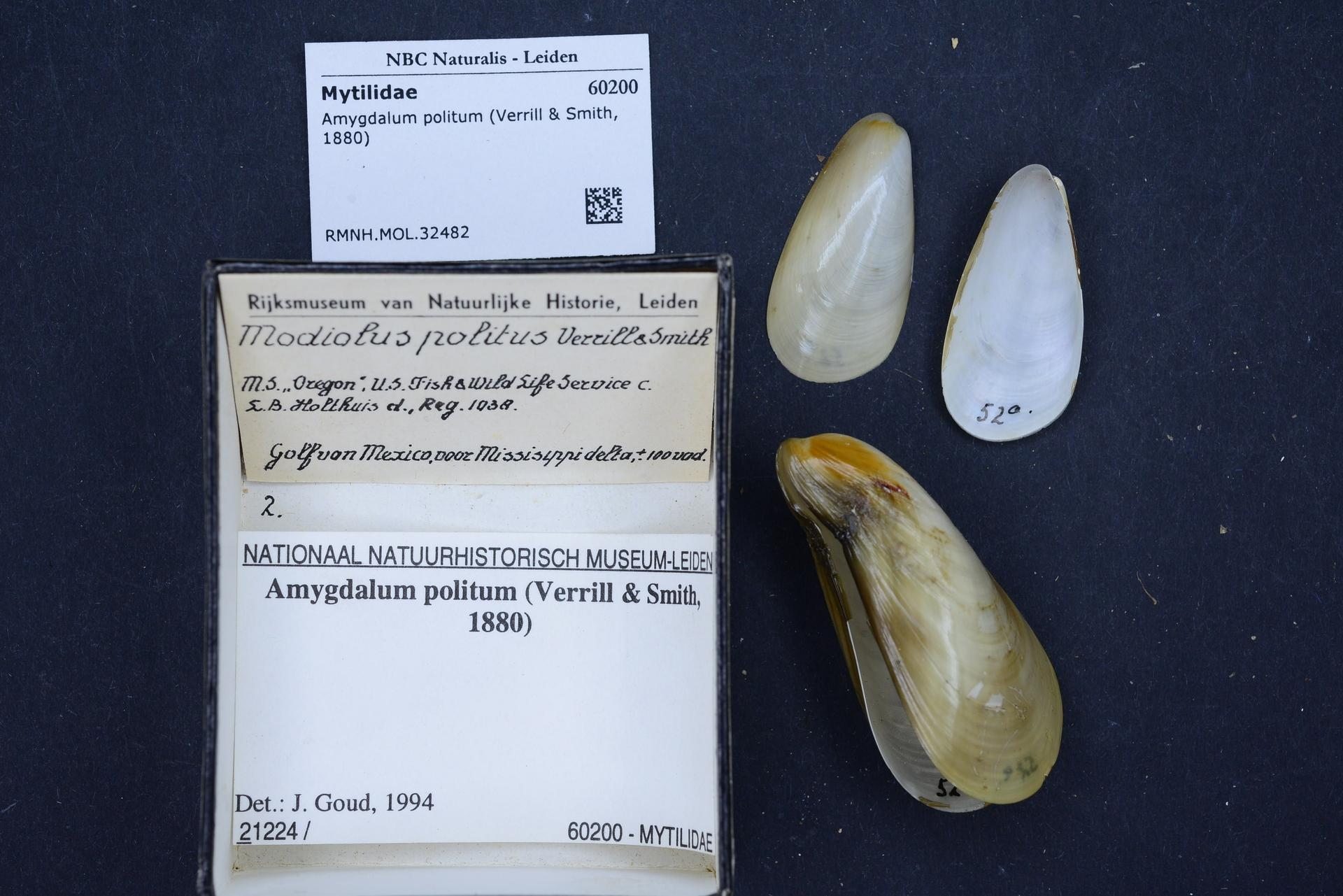
- Amygdalum politum

Scientific classification
- Kingdom: Animalia
- Phylum: Mollusca
- Class: Bivalvia
- Order: Mytilida
- Family: Mytilidae
- Genus: Amygdalum; Muhlfeld, 1811

Synonyms
- Modiella Monterosato, 1884; Modiola (Amygdalum) Megerle von Mühlfeld, 1811; Modiolus (Amygdalum) Megerle von Mühlfeld, 1811 superseded combination; Volsella (Amygdalum) Megerle von Mühlfeld, 1811

= Amygdalum =

Genus of bivalves

Amygdalum is a genus of saltwater mussels, marine bivalve mollusks in the family Mytilidae, the true mussels.

== Species ==
Species within the genus Amydalum include:

- Amygdalum americanum T. Soot-Ryen, 1955
- Amygdalum anoxicolum P. G. Oliver, 2001
- Amygdalum arborescens (Fischer von Waldheim, 1807)
- † Amygdalum barbatiaeforme (K. Martin, 1916)
- † Amygdalum dolichum (Suter, 1917)
- Amygdalum newcombi (Dall, Bartsch & Rehder, 1938)
- Amygdalum pallidulum (Dall, 1916)
- Amygdalum peasei (Newcomb, 1870)
- Amygdalum politum (A. E. Verrill & S. Smith, 1880)
- † Amygdalum progoense (K. Martin, 1916)
- Amygdalum sagittatum (Rehder, 1935)
- Amygdalum soyoae Habe, 1958
- Amygdalum striatum (F. W. Hutton, 1873)
- Amygdalum watsoni (E. A. Smith, 1885)

Synonyms

- Amygdalum agglutinans (Cantraine, 1835): synonym of Lioberus agglutinans (Cantraine, 1835)
- Amygdalum beddomei Iredale, 1924: synonym of Amygdalum striatum (F. W. Hutton, 1873) (junior subjective synonym)
- Amygdalum dendriticum Megerle von Mühlfeld, 1811: synonym of Amygdalum arborescens (Fischer von Waldheim, 1807)
- Amygdalum frixum Mörch, 1853: synonym of Barbatia amygdalumtostum (Röding, 1798)
- Amygdalum japonica (Dunker, 1857): synonym of Arcuatula japonica (Dunker, 1857) (superseded combination)
- Amygdalum luteum (P. Fischer, 1882): synonym of Amygdalum politum (A. E. Verrill & S. Smith, 1880) (junior subjective synonym)
- Amygdalum papyrium (Conrad, 1846) — paper mussel: synonym of Arcuatula papyria (Conrad, 1846) (superseded combination)
- Amygdalum plumeum Kuroda & Habe, 1971: synonym of Amygdalum peasei (Newcomb, 1870)
