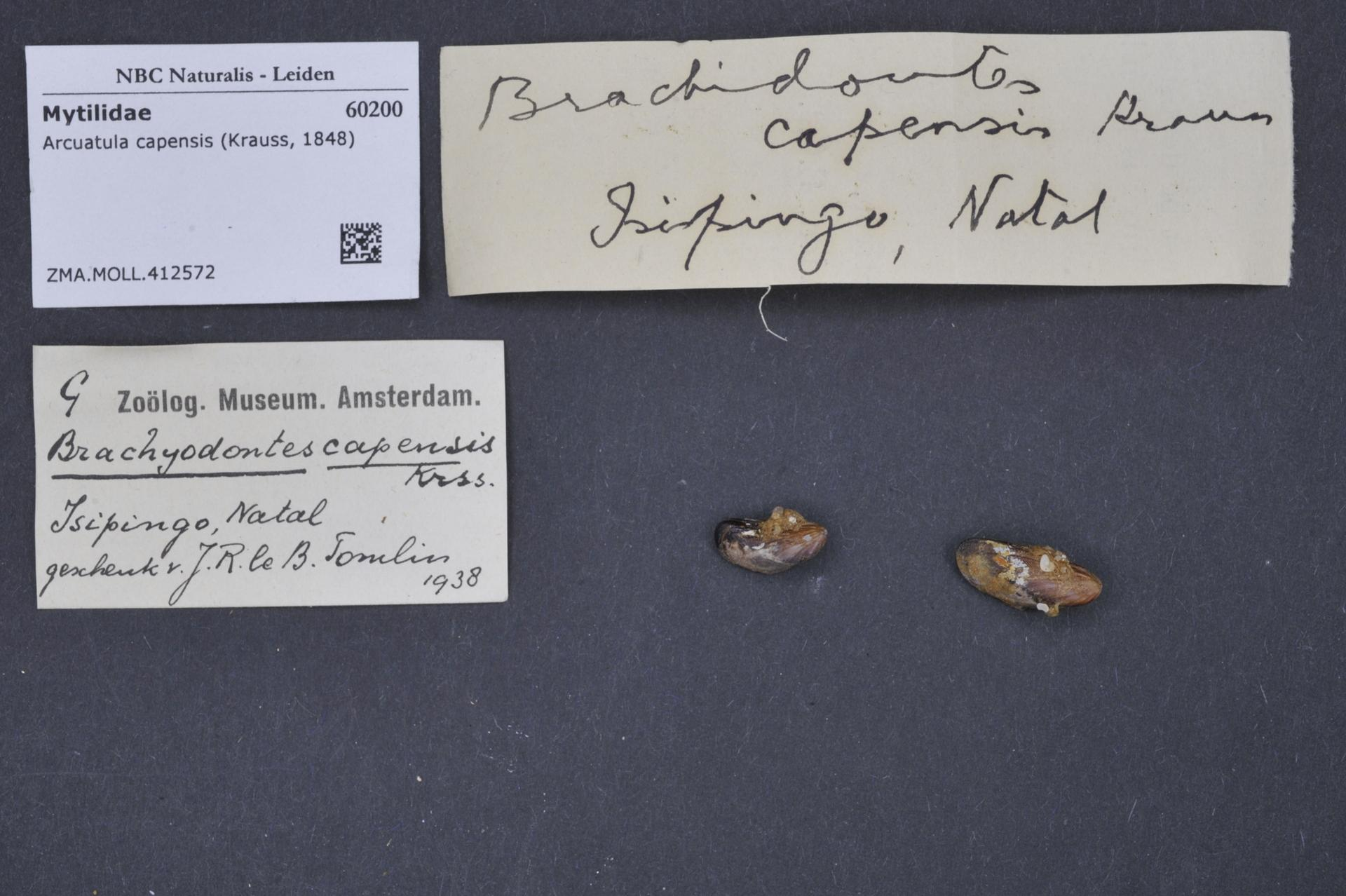

Scientific classification
- Kingdom: Animalia
- Phylum: Mollusca
- Class: Bivalvia
- Order: Mytilida
- Family: Mytilidae
- Genus: Arcuatula
- Species: A. capensis

Binomial name
- Arcuatula capensis (Krauss, 1848)

Synonyms
- Modiola capensis F. Krauss, 1848; Modiola tenerrima E. A. Smith, 1904; Lamya capensis (Krauss, 1848); Modiolus capensis (Krauss, 1848)

= Arcuatula capensis =

Species of bivalve

Arcuatula capensis is a species of bivalve in the family Mytilidae. The scientific name of the species was first validly published in 1848 by C.F.F. von Krauss.
