= Solamen persicum =

Scientific classification
- Domain: Eukaryota
- Kingdom: Animalia
- Phylum: Mollusca
- Class: Bivalvia
- Order: Mytilida
- Family: Mytilidae
- Genus: Solamen
- Species: S. persicum

Binomial name
- Solamen persicum (E. A. Smith, 1906)

Synonyms
- List: Crenella adamsiana Melvill & Standen, 1907; Crenella persica E. A. Smith, 1906; Crenella persicum [lapsus] E. A. Smith, 1906; Loripes decussata H. Adams, 1870

Species of bivalve

Solamen persicum is a species of mussel in the family Mytilidae. It is native to the Arabian Sea.
