= Amygdala (disambiguation) =

The amygdala is part of the human brain.

Amygdala, a Latin word meaning 'almond', may also refer to:

== Sciences ==
- Amygdalin, a compound in almonds
- Amygdalum, a genus of mussel
- Amygdule or amygdale, infilled vesicles in rocks
- Melora amygdaloides, a genus of moth
- Bastilla amygdalis, a species of moth in the family Noctuidae
- Salix amygdaloides, or the peach leaf willow, native to North America
- Euphorbia amygdaloides, the wood spurge, a plant native to Eastern Europe

== Arts and media ==
- "Amygdala (song)", a song by Agust D
- Amygdala, 2011 album by Swedish industrial project Deutsch Nepal
- "Amygdala", a song by Henry Cow from Legend
- "Amygdala", a song by Ecco2k and Bladee
- Amygdala Music, the music composition arm of TV production company Original Productions
- Amygdala (character), a comic book character
- Amygdala, a boss in the video game, Bloodborne

== See also ==
- Amidala, a character in the Star Wars prequels
