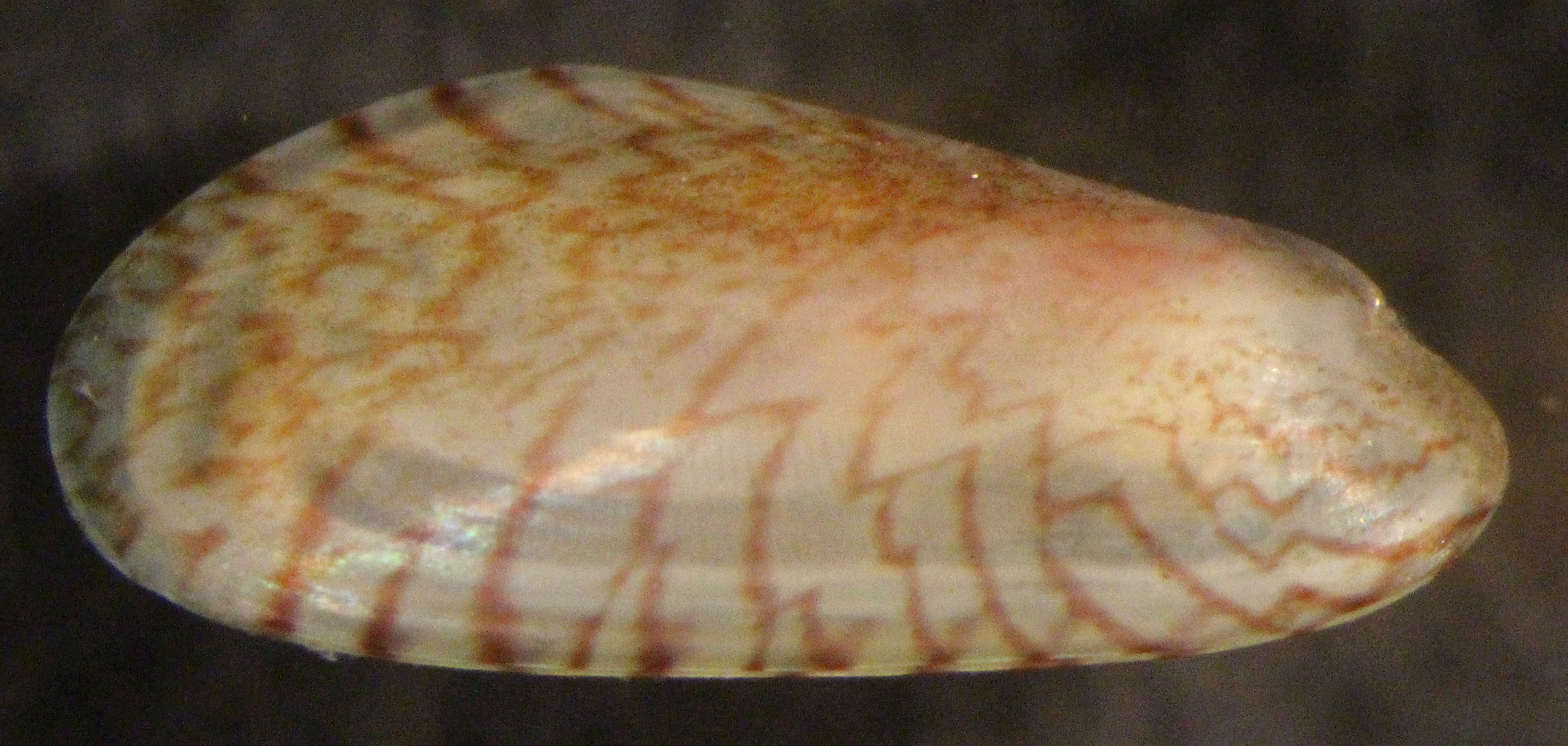
- Valve of Arcuatula papyria (specimen at the Smithsonian Environmental Research Center)

Conservation status
- Secure (NatureServe)

Scientific classification
- Kingdom: Animalia
- Phylum: Mollusca
- Class: Bivalvia
- Order: Mytilida
- Family: Mytilidae
- Genus: Arcuatula
- Species: A. papyria

Binomial name
- Arcuatula papyria (Conrad, 1846)

Synonyms
- Amygdalum papyrium (Conrad, 1846) superseded combination; Modiola papyria Conrad, 1846; Modiola pulex H. C. Lea, 1842 ( junior homonym of Modiola pulex Lamarck, 1819)

= Arcuatula papyria =

Species of bivalve

Arcuatula papyria, common name the Atlantic paper mussel, is a species of marine bivalve mollusc in the family Mytilidae, the true mussels.

This species occurs along the Atlantic coast of North America, from Maryland to Florida, as well as in the Gulf of Mexico, from Texas to Mexico.

== Description ==
The Atlantic paper mussel has a pair of fragile, elongated, oval valves. The shell is narrower at the anterior, hinged end and the umbones are prominent. The outer surface of the valves is a greenish-yellow colour, often with irregular rust-coloured zigzag markings. The interior is glistening white.

== Distribution and habitat ==
The Atlantic paper mussel is found in the western Atlantic Ocean, the Caribbean Sea and the Gulf of Mexico, with its range extending from Maryland in the north to Venezuela in the south. On the east and west coasts of Florida it is usually found growing in seagrass beds in lagoons.

== Biology ==
The Atlantic paper mussel is attached to the seabed and other nearby mussels by means of byssus threads secreted by a gland in the foot. In some areas it is very common and in the Nassau River estuary in Florida in 1993 was recorded at a density of 3325 per square metre (309 per sq ft). It is a filter feeder and draws water into the mantle cavity, passes it over its gills where the plankton on which it feeds adhere to mucus-covered cilia, and expels the water from the posterior end of the shell.

Breeding takes place between October and January. The sexes are separate in this mussel, and gametes are liberated into the sea, where fertilisation takes place. The larvae develop rapidly and at the veliger stage are distinguishable from other mytilid larvae by the small number of teeth on the hinge of their developing shell.
