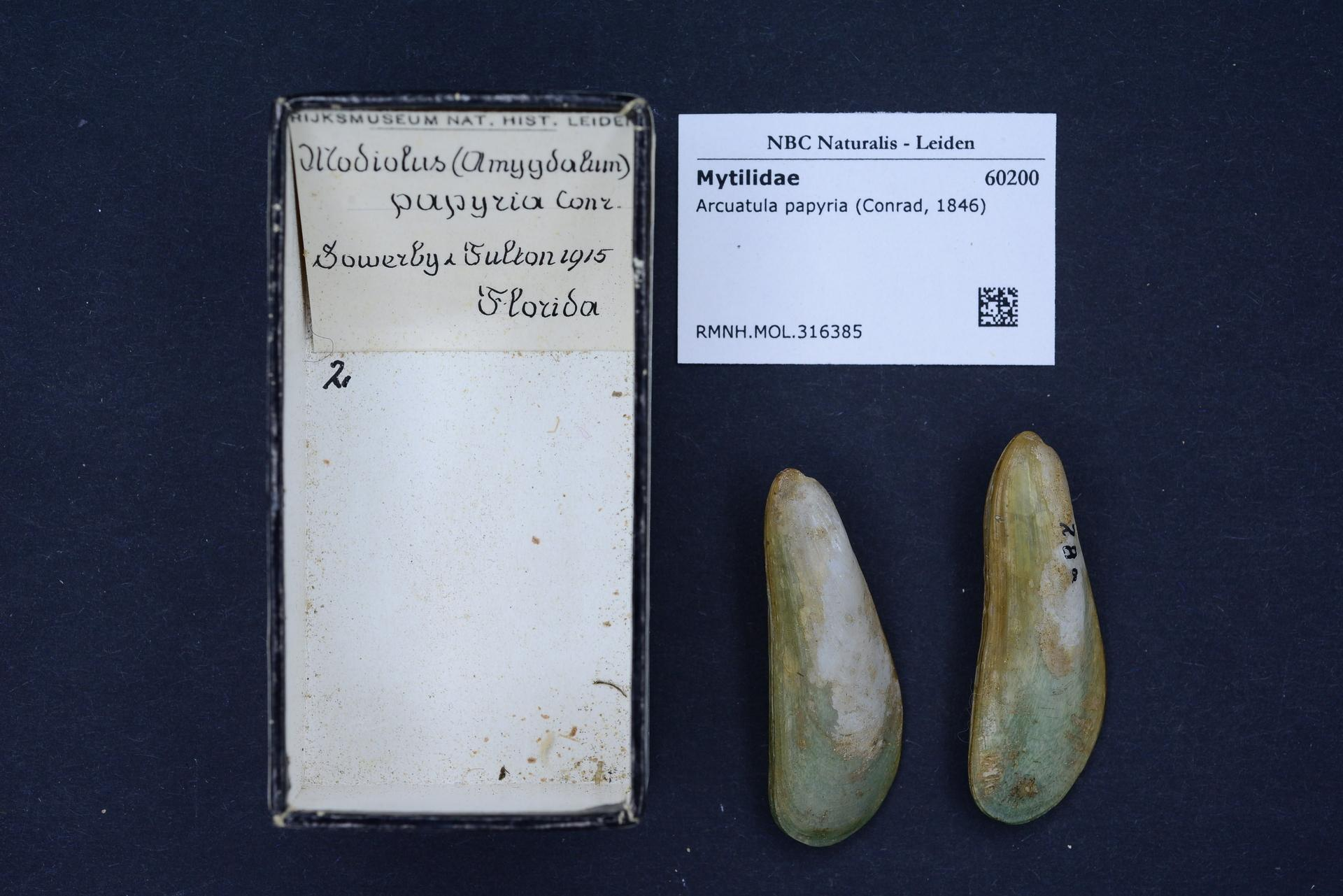
- Arcuatula papyria

Scientific classification
- Kingdom: Animalia
- Phylum: Mollusca
- Class: Bivalvia
- Order: Mytilida
- Family: Mytilidae
- Subfamily: Crenellinae
- Genus: Arcuatula; Jousseaume in Lamy, 1919

Type species
- Arcuatula perfragilis Dunker, 1857

Species
- See text.

Synonyms
- Lamya Soot-Ryen, 1958; Musculista Yamamoto & Habe, 1958

= Arcuatula =

Genus of bivalves

Arcuatula is a genus of mussels from the family Mytilidae.

== Species ==
The following species are currently recognised under the genus Arcuatula:

- Arcuatula arcuatula (Hanley, 1843)
- Arcuatula capensis (Krauss, 1848)
- Arcuatula elegans (Gray, 1828)
- Arcuatula glaberrima (Dunker, 1857)
- Arcuatula japonica (Dunker, 1857)
- Arcuatula leucosticta (Martens, 1897)
- Arcuatula papyria (Conrad, 1846)
- Arcuatula perfragilis (Dunker, 1857)
- Arcuatula senhousia (Benson, 1842)
- Arcuatula tristis (Dunker, 1857)
- Arcuatula variegata (Benson, 1856)
