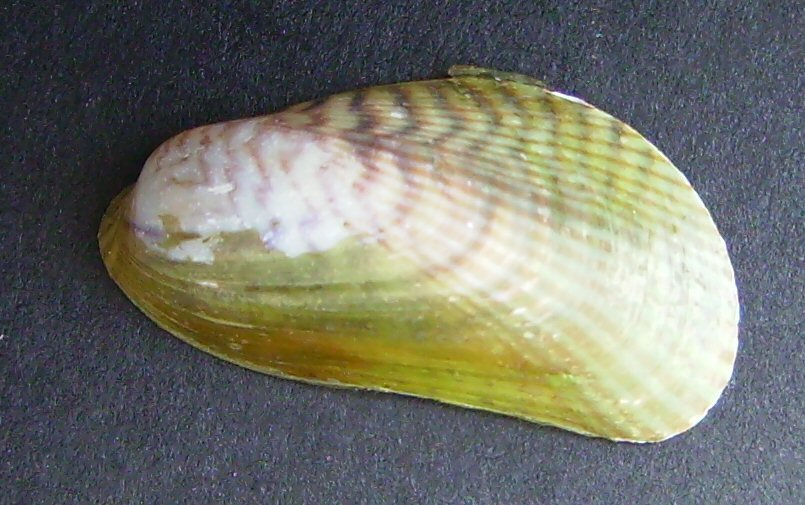
- Exterior of left valve of an Asian date mussel

Scientific classification
- Kingdom: Animalia
- Phylum: Mollusca
- Class: Bivalvia
- Order: Mytilida
- Family: Mytilidae
- Genus: Arcuatula
- Species: A. senhousia

Binomial name
- Arcuatula senhousia (Benson), 1842)

Synonyms
- Modiola aquarius Grabau & King, 1928; Modiola bellardiana Tapparone Canefri, 1874; Modiola senhousia Benson, 1842; Musculista senhousia (Benson, 1842)

= Arcuatula senhousia =

Species of mollusc

Arcuatula senhousia (Musculista senhousia), commonly known as the Asian date mussel, Asian mussel, or bag mussel, is a small saltwater mussel, a marine bivalve mollusk species in the family Mytilidae, the mussels. Other common names for this species include the Japanese mussel, Senhouse's mussel, the green mussel (a name also applied to Perna viridis), and the green bagmussel. It is harvested for human consumption in China.

This mussel is native to the Pacific Ocean from Siberia to Singapore, but it has also been accidentally introduced and become an invasive species in numerous other areas worldwide. It can live in the intertidal or shallow subtidal zones. In California, the species has been recorded in densities of up to 150,000 individuals per square meter. It grows quickly and lives only about two years. It prefers soft substrates and surrounds its shell in a dense mass of byssus. One of several negative impacts of this invasive species is that it has a detrimental effect on eelgrass.

== Description ==
This species is differentiated from other mussels by its relatively small size and inflated shape, as well as by the greenish colour of its outer periostracal layer. The shell has radiating, reddish lines on its posterior surfaces, small internal teeth on the dorsal edge posterior to the ligament, and small ribs anterior to the umbones. It can grow up to 30 mm (1 1/8 in) in length. It is also known for its relatively fast growth and has a maximum lifetime of about two years.

== Distribution ==
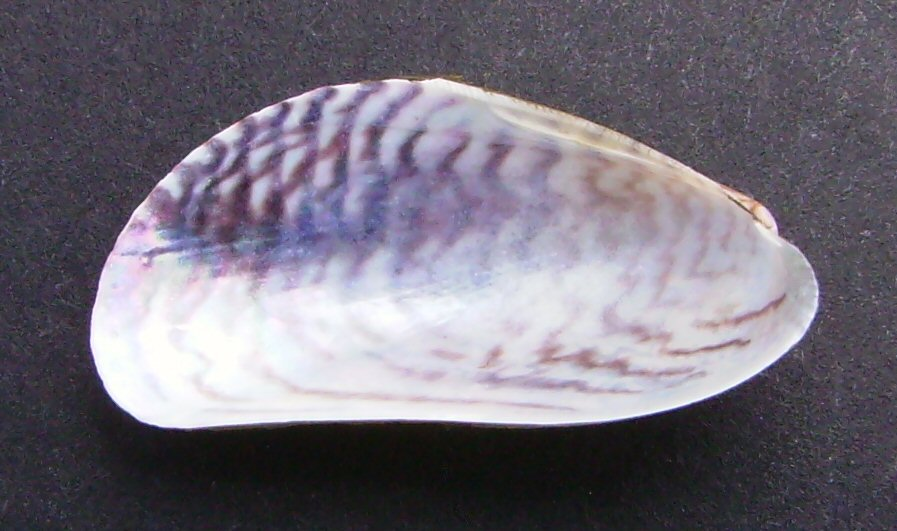
Interior of left valve of an Asian date mussel

Arcuatula senhousia is native to the Western Pacific Ocean, inhabiting coastal areas from Siberia and the Kuril Islands south to Singapore. The mussel has become an invasive species in California, the Mediterranean, Australia, and New Zealand. It was introduced to the West Coast of the United States sometime in the early 20th century with shipments of Japanese oysters. In 1983, large specimens of the species were collected in the Swan River estuary in Western Australia. The mussel has been present in the Waitemata Harbour of Auckland since the 1970s, becoming established by 1984. Specimens have also been reported at the Tamar estuary in Tasmania. Invasion of the aforementioned locales is thought to have been achieved in a variety of manners; the mussels were transported on the hulls of ships, in water-intake chambers and the ducts of ships, as planktonic larvae carried in the ballast water of bulk-cargo vessels, in association with intentionally introduced oysters, and by Lessepsian migration through the Suez Canal.

== Ecology ==
=== Habitat ===
The Asian date mussel is generally found in sheltered mud or other soft substrates up to 20 m (66 ft) below the surface of the water. In China and Japan, where it is native, the mussels are found in intertidal zones with densities up to 2500/m. In Australia, as an invasive species, they are found from 0.5 to 4.0 m (1 1/2 to 13 ft) below the surface of the water in slightly higher densities. Along the West Coast of North America, however, the species generally reaches densities of 5,000 to 10,000/m^{2} and has been recorded at densities of up to 150,000m^{2} in Mission Bay in San Diego, California. The mussel is most abundant in the summer and early autumn. In the Swan River estuary in Western Australia, the mussel population has a high mortality rate in the late autumn and early winter. This may be the result of a decrease in water salinity from increased rainfall.m^{2}

=== Behavior ===
Arcuatula senhousia uses byssal threads to form a sort of cocoon around itself. The cocoon may be necessary for protection due to the relatively thin shells of the species, as well as to assist in the stabilization of the individuals within the sediment. The cocoons of the individuals can intertwine to form a mat that tends to trap other shells, sediment, algae, and detritus on its surface.

=== Predators ===
Predators of the Asian date mussel vary depending on the native fauna of the area. In the Swan River estuary, for example, predation occurs mainly by boring carnivorous gastropods such as Nassarius burchardi or Bedeva paivae, which drill through the mussel's thin shell. In Mission Bay in San Diego, however, the mussel's main predators include the yellowfin croaker, spotfin croaker, sargo, willet, and marbled godwit (three fish and two bird species, respectively). Other less-significant predators include carnivorous gastropods (especially Pteropurpura festiva), crustaceans, echinoderms, fish, and diving ducks. Recent research has emphasized the importance of the predation of A. senhousia by native fauna as a means of reducing the negative effects of the invasive species on ecosystems.

Asian date mussels also face predation by humans. The mussel is gathered as food in China, as food for domestic organisms in Japan, Thailand, and India, as well as bait for fishing throughout Asia. Currently, no commercial or recreational uses exist for the mussel in the invaded areas. Harvesting the species might help reduce the effects of their invasion, but a number of detrimental effects are associated with benthic harvesting.

== Impact on invaded ecosystems ==
The Asian date mussel can have a variety of effects on various ecosystems. In the Swan River estuary, for example, the presence of mats of A. senhousia has caused an increase in the biomass of benthic macro-organisms in general.

In Mission Bay in San Diego, the increasing abundance of Asian date mussels has caused a decrease in species richness and abundance of the native Solen rostriformis, as well as the complete disappearance of the native Chione fluctifraga. The Asian date mussel has also become 100 times more abundant than any native bivalves. Two other native species have appeared in the bay, however: Macoma nasuta and Chione undatella. Laboratory experiments using these species show that the growth and survival of the surface-dwelling and suspension-feeding species of the Chione genus decrease dramatically in areas where the Asian date mussel is abundant. Populations of the deeper-dwelling and deposit-feeding Macoma nasuta are not significantly affected, however, by the invasion of the mussel.

Similar occurrences have been observed at Sacca di Goro, a brackish lagoon in the Po River Delta of the Northern Adriatic Sea in Italy, which the Asian date mussel invaded in the early 1990s. Researchers there have found that growth and survival of suspension feeders has significantly decreased following the arrival of the Asian date mussel. There has also been a concomitant increase in the abundance of detritivores and herbivores.

Deeper-dwelling species are less affected by the invasion of the Asian date mussel. Mussel mats have no significant effect on the mortality of deeper-dwelling clam species such as Tapes decussatus and Ruditapes philippinarum.

Competition with native species is the primary cause of concern in areas of New Zealand where the Asian date mussel has invaded. Significantly fewer macrofaunal invertebrates occur, and an eightfold decrease in the abundance of infaunal bivalves was found. The adverse environmental effects of the mussel in New Zealand are thought to be localized and short-lived.

Arcuatula senhousia shares its habitat with eelgrass (Zostera marina) in many of the areas in which it has invaded. The presence of the mussel has been shown to affect rhizome growth in the eelgrass; this decreases the ability of established patches to spread. The Asian date mussel had the most detrimental effect on rhizome growth in areas where the eelgrass was sparse and patchy, which is a cause of concern for conservationists because beds of eelgrass are already degraded and sparse as a result of anthropogenic forces. The presence of A. senhousia can only worsen the situation.
