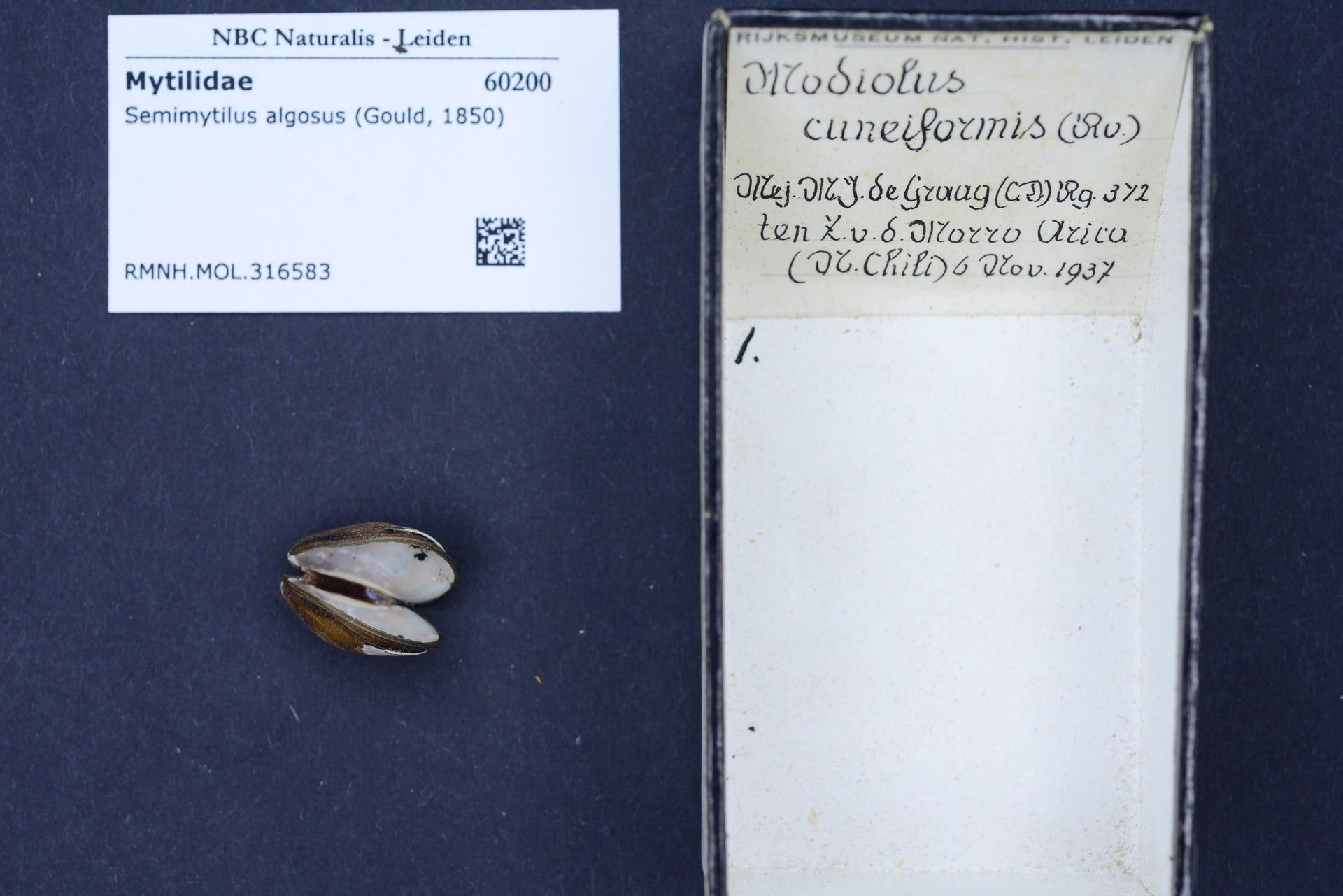

Scientific classification
- Domain: Eukaryota
- Kingdom: Animalia
- Phylum: Mollusca
- Class: Bivalvia
- Order: Mytilida
- Family: Mytilidae
- Genus: Semimytilus; Soot-Ryen, 1955

= Semimytilus =

Genus of bivalves

Semimytilus is a genus in the family Mytilidae. The genus is also connected with freshwater habitats.

== Species ==
Species in this genus include:

- Semimytilus algosus
- Semimytilus pseudocapensis
