= Green mussel =

Green mussel is a common name for different bivalve species, including:

- Arcuatula senhousia
- Perna canaliculus
- Perna viridis
