= Golden croaker =

Golden croaker may be a common name for several species of croaker:

- Roncador stearnsii
- Micropogonias undulatus
- Umbrina roncador
- Umbrina xanti
