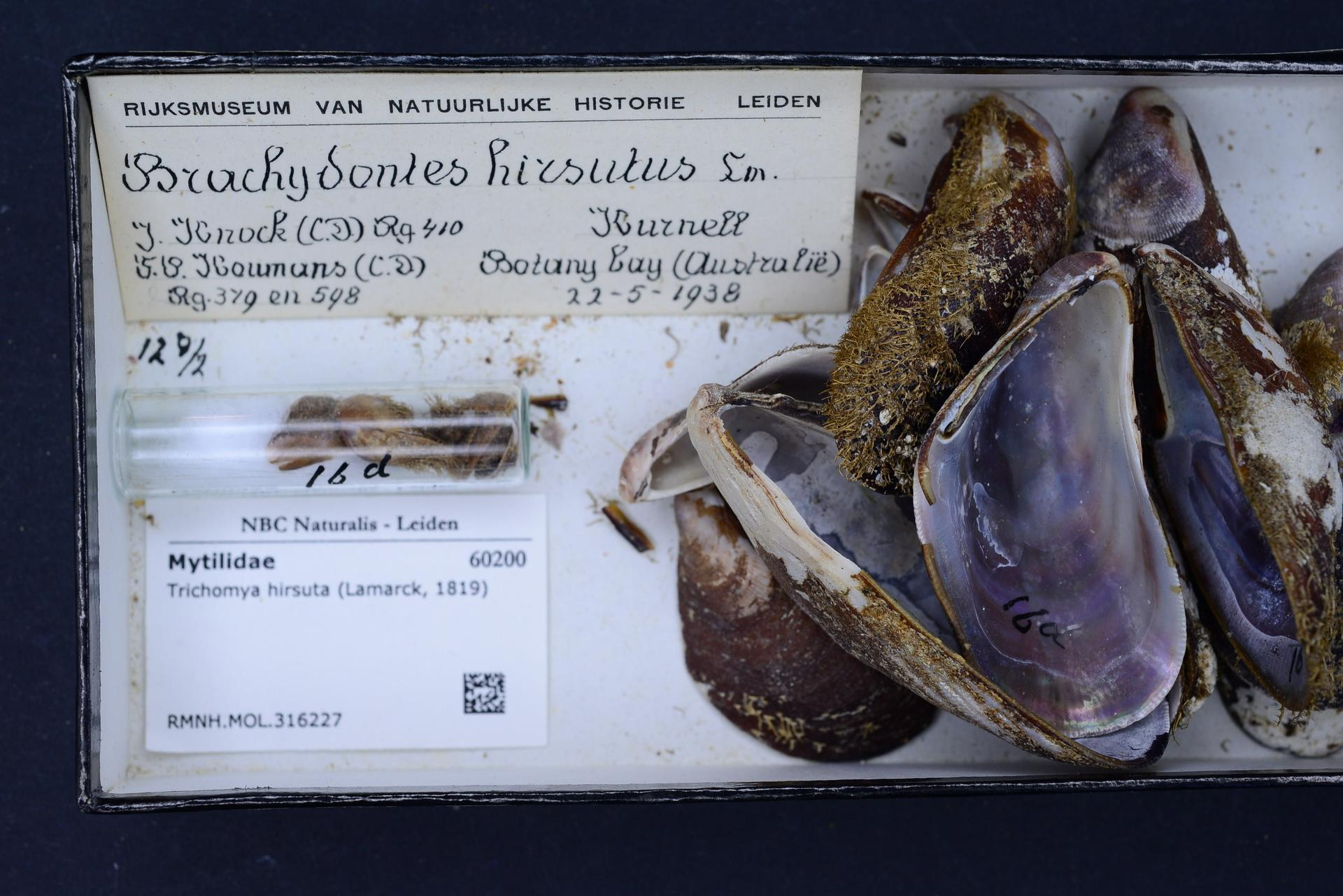

Scientific classification
- Kingdom: Animalia
- Phylum: Mollusca
- Class: Bivalvia
- Order: Mytilida
- Family: Mytilidae
- Genus: Trichomya; Ihering, 1900
- Species: T. hirsuta

Binomial name
- Trichomya hirsuta (Lamarck, 1819)

Synonyms
- Mytilus hirsuta Lamarck, 1819

= Trichomya =

Hairy mussel

Genus of bivalves

Trichomya is a monotypic genus of marine bivalve molluscs in the family Mytilidae, the mussels. The only species is Trichomya hirsuta which is endemic to southern and eastern Australia. Its common names include the hairy mussel, the greenling and the kelp greenling.

== Description ==
The hairy mussel grows to a length of about 55 millimetres (2.2 in). The lower valve of the shell has a dense covering of short hairs.

== Distribution and habitat ==
The hairy mussel is found around the coasts of Tasmania and southern and eastern Australia as far north as Cairns. It lives on exposed reefs and among rocks and seaweed in the intertidal and subtidal zone, attaching itself to hard surfaces using its byssus threads. It is an important constituent of the seabed fauna where it forms dense beds of tangled material providing a habitat for other species.

== Research ==
The hairy mussel is a major part of the megafauna of Lake Macquarie, in New South Wales, Australia. Its dense growth tends to block condenser pipes and encrusts other submerged structures. It is tolerant of low oxygen levels in the water and its temperature tolerance range has been researched in connection with using the waters of the lake for cooling power stations. It was found to be much less tolerant to changes of water temperature than the mussel Mytilus edulis and the clam Mya arenaria.

Bivalve molluscs tend to accumulate in their tissues any pollutants found in the surrounding waters and can be used as bioindicators. In a study of nine different species of mollusc found in tropical marine waters, it was concluded that the hairy mussel was the most suitable to monitor pollution. It reflected in its tissues the level of heavy metals (Pb, Cd, Cu, Zn, Co, Ni, and Ag) in its environment and there was a linear relationship between the sedimentary levels and the tissue concentration of all the metals except zinc.
