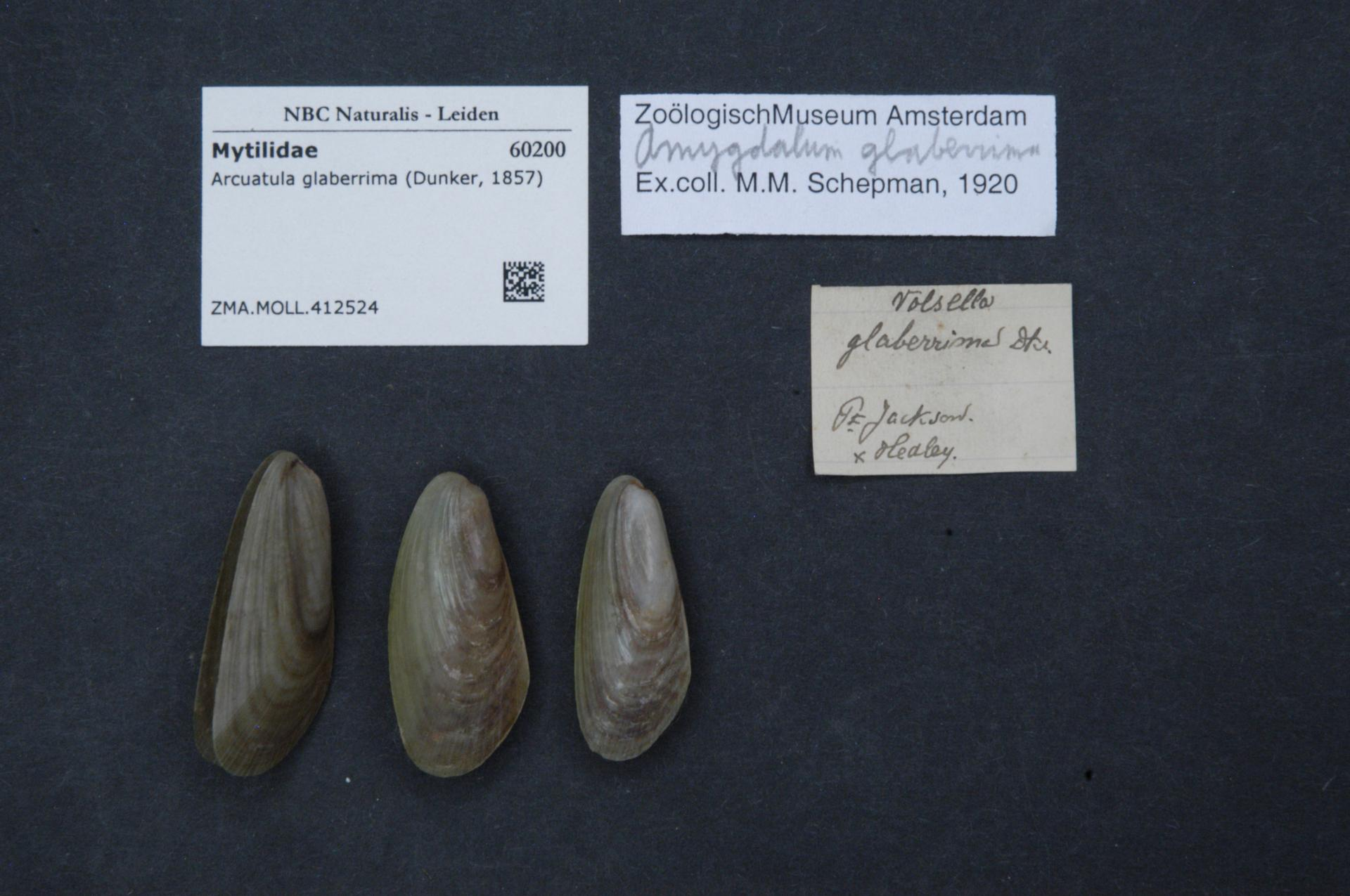

Scientific classification
- Kingdom: Animalia
- Phylum: Mollusca
- Class: Bivalvia
- Order: Mytilida
- Family: Mytilidae
- Genus: Arcuatula
- Species: A. glaberrima

Binomial name
- Arcuatula glaberrima (Dunker, 1857)

= Arcuatula glaberrima =

Species of bivalve

Arcuatula glaberrima is a species of bivalve in the family Mytilidae. The scientific name of the species was first validly published in 1857 by Dunker.
