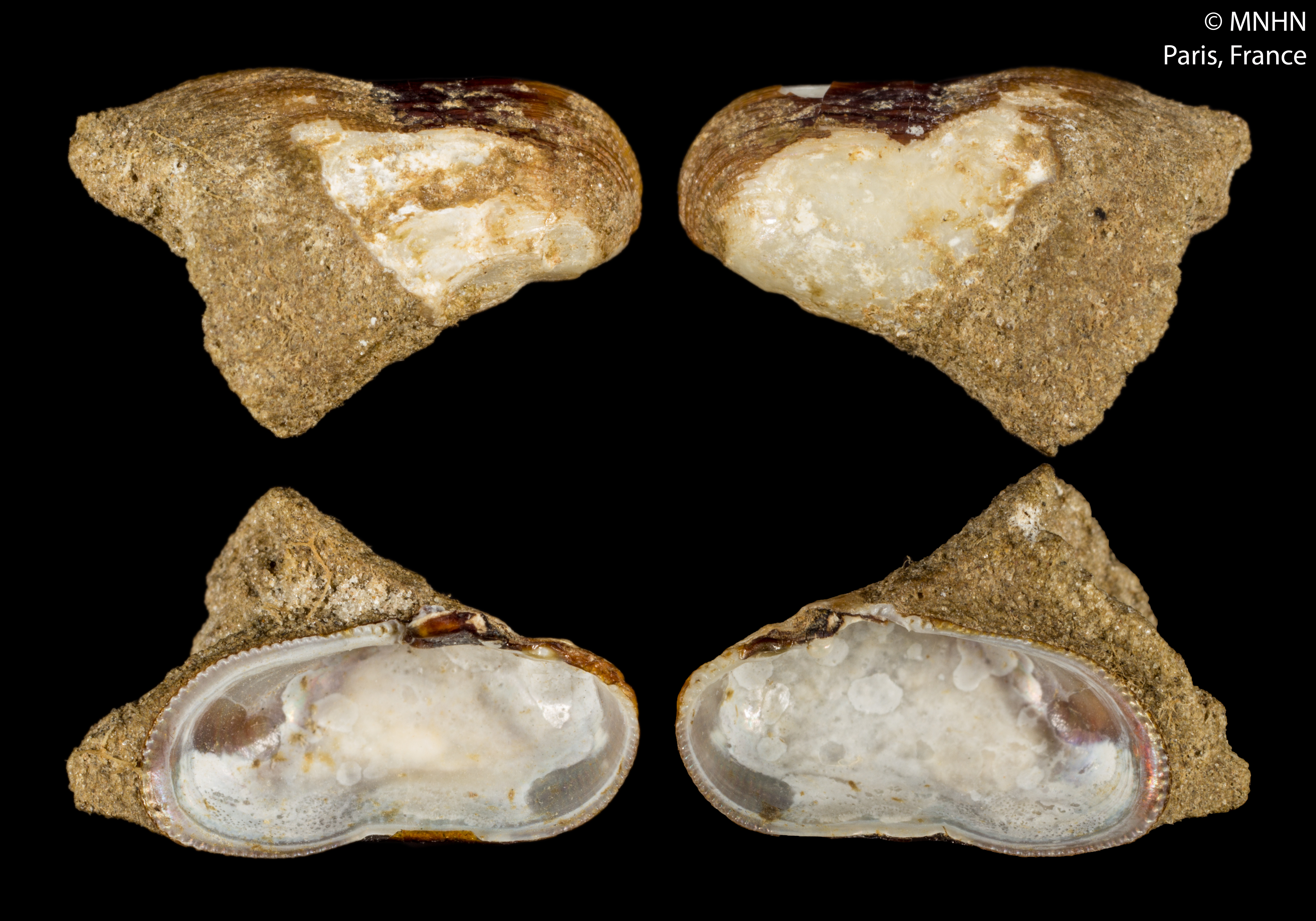
- Shell of Gregariella vignoni (syntype at MNHN, Paris)

Scientific classification
- Domain: Eukaryota
- Kingdom: Animalia
- Phylum: Mollusca
- Class: Bivalvia
- Order: Mytilida
- Family: Mytilidae
- Genus: Gregariella; Monterosato, 1884

Synonyms
- Botulina Dall, 1889; Musculus (Gregariella) Monterosato, 1884; Musculus (Propetilus) Iredale, 1937; Propetilus Iredale, 1937; Tibialectus Iredale, 1939; Trichomusculus Iredale, 1924 (junior synonym); &type_species= Modiolus sulcatus Risso, 1826

= Gregariella =

Genus of bivalves

Gregariella is a genus of mussels in the family Mytilidae.

== Selected species ==
- Gregariella australis (E. von Martens, 1879)
- Gregariella bakeri (Dall, Bartsch & Rehder, 1938)
- Gregariella barbata (Reeve, 1858)
- Gregariella chenui (Récluz, 1842)
- Gregariella coarctata (Carpenter, 1857)
- Gregariella coralliophaga (Gmelin, 1791) — artist's mussel
- Gregariella denticulata (Dall, 1871)
- Gregariella difficilis (Deshayes, 1863)
- Gregariella ehrenbergi (Issel, 1869)
- Gregariella fischeri (E. A. Smith, 1885)
- Gregariella multistriata (E. A. Smith, 1872)
- Gregariella nubilis (Iredale, 1937)
- Gregariella obermulleri (Fischer-Piette & Nicklès, 1946)
- Gregariella petagnae (Scacchi, 1832)
- Gregariella semigranata (Reeve, 1858)
- Gregariella splendida (Reeve, 1858)
- Gregariella vignoni (Petit de la Saussaye, 1862)
