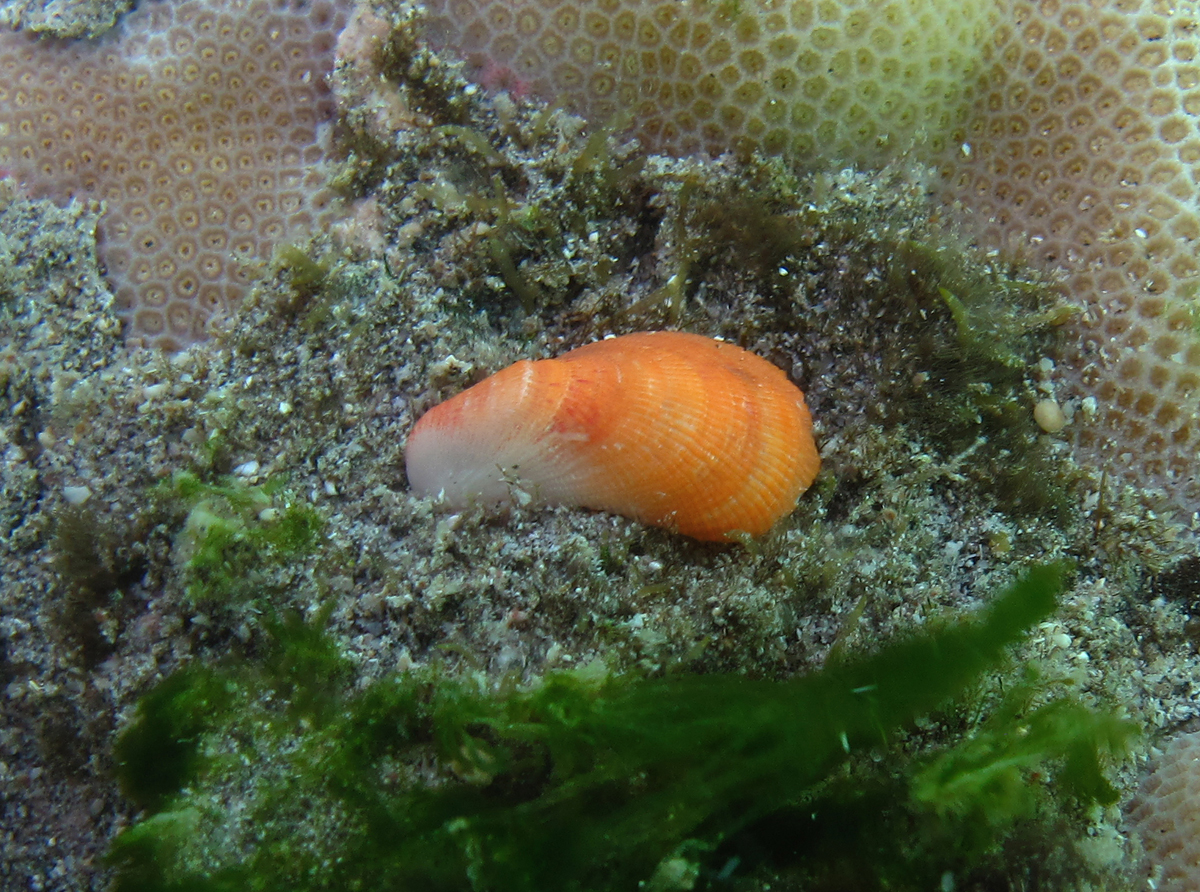
- Septifer bilocularis

Scientific classification
- Domain: Eukaryota
- Kingdom: Animalia
- Phylum: Mollusca
- Class: Bivalvia
- Order: Mytilida
- Family: Mytilidae
- Genus: Septifer; Récluz, 1848

Type species
- Mytilus bilocularis Linnaeus, 1758

Synonyms
- Brachydontes (Hormomya) Mörch, 1853

= Septifer =

Genus of bivalves

Septifer is a genus of saltwater clams, marine bivalve molluscs in the subfamily Septiferinae of the family Mytilidae, the mussels.

== Species ==
The World Register of Marine Species lists the following species:

- Septifer bilocularis (Linnaeus, 1758)
- Septifer cumingii Récluz, 1849
- Septifer excisus (Wiegmann, 1837)
- † Septifer huttoni (Cossmann, 1916)
- † Septifer pissarroi Le Renard, 1994
- Septifer ramulosus (Viader, 1951)
- Septifer rudis Dall, Bartsch & Rehder, 1938
- Septifer rufolineatus (E. A. Smith, 1911)
- † Septifer serratus (Melleville, 1843)
- † Septifer torquatus (P. Marshall, 1918)
- Septifer zeteki Hertlein & A. M. Strong, 1946

Synonyms

- Septifer australis Laseron, 1956: synonym of Septifer cumingii Récluz, 1849
- Septifer bifurcatus (Conrad, 1837): synonym of Mytilisepta bifurcata (Conrad, 1837) (unaccepted combination)
- Septifer bisculpturata Barnard, 1964: synonym of Septifer bisculpturatus Barnard, 1964: synonym of Septifer ramulosus (Viader, 1951) (incorrect grammatical agreement of specific epithet)
- Septifer bisculpturatus Barnard, 1964: synonym of Septifer ramulosus (Viader, 1951)
- Septifer bryanae (Pilsbry, 1921): synonym of Septifer cumingii Récluz, 1849
- Septifer crassus Dunker, 1853: synonym of Mytilisepta virgata (Wiegmann, 1837)
- Septifer cumingi [sic]: synonym of Septifer cumingii Récluz, 1849 (misspelling)
- Septifer forskali Dunker, 1855: synonym of Septifer cumingii Récluz, 1849
- Septifer forskalii Dunker, 1855: synonym of Septifer cumingii Récluz, 1849
- Septifer furcillata Gould, 1861: synonym of Septifer cumingii Récluz, 1849
- Septifer fuscus Récluz, 1848: synonym of Septifer excisus (Wiegmann, 1837)
- Septifer herrmannseni Dunker, 1853: synonym of Mytilisepta virgata (Wiegmann, 1837)
- Septifer keenae Nomura, 1936: synonym of Mytilisepta keenae (Nomura, 1936)
- Septifer keeni Nomura, 1936: synonym of Septifer keenae Nomura, 1936: synonym of Mytilisepta keenae (Nomura, 1936) (incorrect original spelling)
- Septifer pulcher Z.-R. Wang, 1983: synonym of Septifer cumingii Récluz, 1849
- Septifer trautwineana Tryon, 1866: synonym of Mytilopsis trautwineana (Tryon, 1866) (original combination)
- Septifer troschelii Dunker, 1853: synonym of Septifer excisus (Wiegmann, 1837)
- Septifer vaughani Dall, Bartsch & Rehder, 1938: synonym of Septifer excisus (Wiegmann, 1837)
- Septifer virgatus (Wiegmann, 1837): synonym of Mytilisepta virgata (Wiegmann, 1837)
- Septifer xishaensis Z.-R. Wang, 1983: synonym of Septifer rudis Dall, Bartsch & Rehder, 1938
