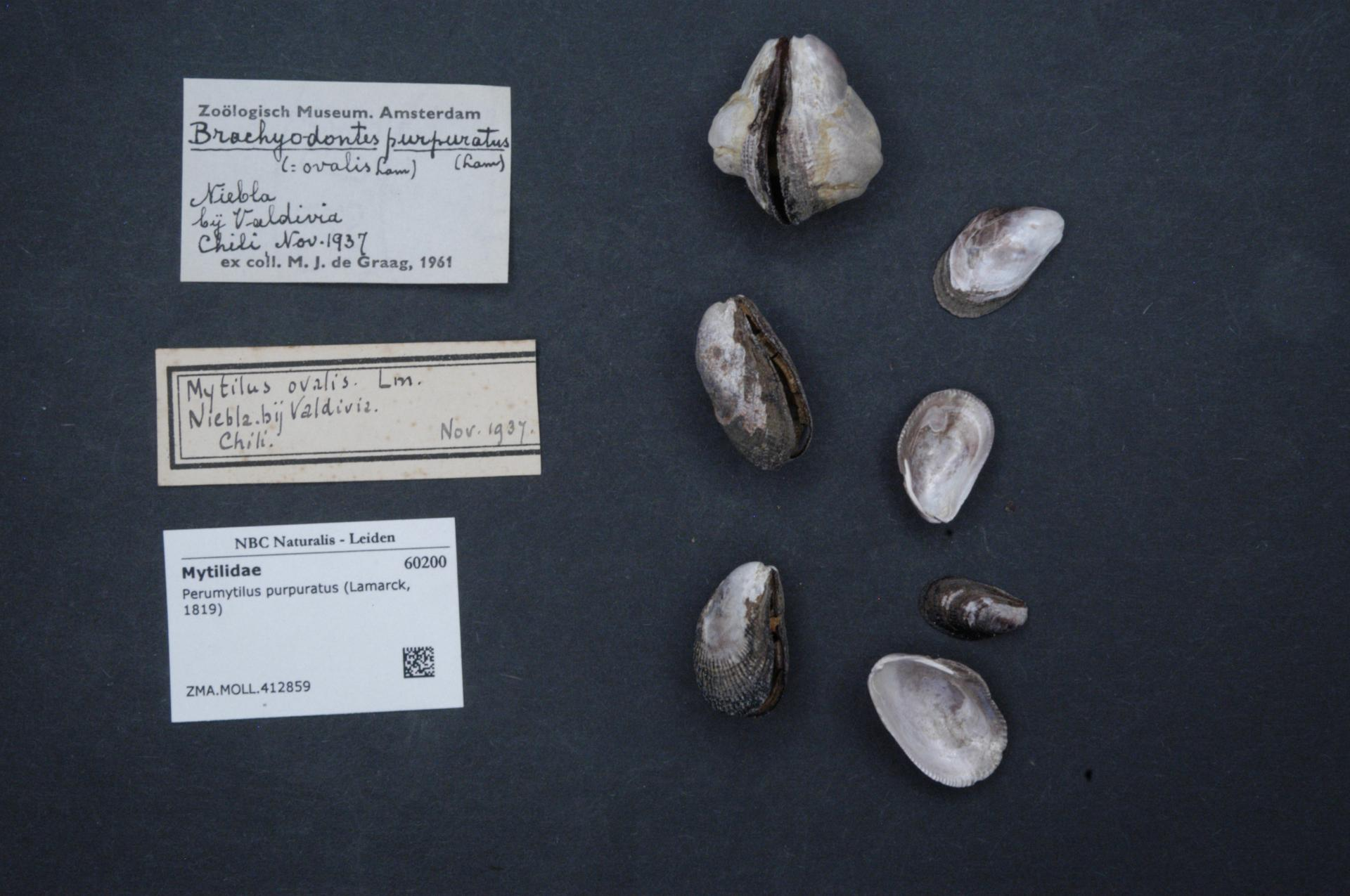
- Perumytilus purpuratus

Scientific classification
- Domain: Eukaryota
- Kingdom: Animalia
- Phylum: Mollusca
- Class: Bivalvia
- Order: Mytilida
- Family: Mytilidae
- Genus: Perumytilus; Olsson, 1961
- Species: P. purpuratus

Binomial name
- Perumytilus purpuratus (Lamarck, 1819)

= Perumytilus =

Genus of bivalves

Perumytilus is a monotypic genus of bivalves belonging to the family Mytilidae. The only species is Perumytilus purpuratus.

The species is found in Southern America.
