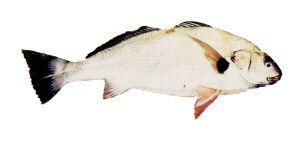

Conservation status
- Least Concern (IUCN 3.1)

Scientific classification
- Kingdom: Animalia
- Phylum: Chordata
- Class: Actinopterygii
- Order: Acanthuriformes
- Family: Sciaenidae
- Genus: Roncador; Jordan & Gilbert, 1880
- Species: R. stearnsii

Binomial name
- Roncador stearnsii (Steindachner, 1876)

Synonyms
- Corvina stearnsii Steindachner, 1876

= Spotfin croaker =

Species of fish

The spotfin croaker (Roncador stearnsii) is a species of marine ray-finned fish belonging to the family Sciaenidae, the drums and croakers, and is found in the Eastern Pacific Ocean. It is the only species in the genus Roncador.

== Description ==
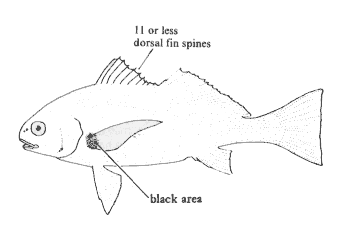
Identification poster

The body of the spotfin croaker is elongate, but heavy forward. The upper profile of the head is steep and slightly curved, and abruptly rounded at the very blunt snout. The mouth is underneath the head (subterminal). The color is silvery gray on the back white below, and may have a bluish blotch near the head. There are dark wavy lines on the side, and a distinct large black spot at the base of the pectoral fin, the sake of the fish's name.

The subterminal mouth, absence of a fleshy barbel and the large black spot at the base of the pectoral fin distinguish spotfin croakers from all other California croakers. Small "spotties" are sometimes confused with small white croakers, but a count of the dorsal fin spines will quickly separate them; the spotfin croaker has 11 or fewer (usually ten), while the white croaker has 12 to 15. So-called "golden croakers" are nothing more than large male spotfin croakers in breeding colors.

This fish can reach a maximum size of 68 centimetres (27 in) and 4.8 kilograms (10.5 lb), with one fish caught in 1951 reported at 6.8 kilograms (15 lb). Most spotfin croaker caught are small to medium-sized fish. They can live to a maximum age of 24 years.

== Range and ecology ==
This species occurs from Mazatlán, Mexico, to Point Conception, California, including the Gulf of California. In California, they are most commonly found south of Los Angeles Harbor. They live along beaches and in bays over bottoms varying from coarse sand to heavy mud and at depths varying from 1 to 15 metres (3.3 to 49.2 ft), and have been recorded at a maximum depth of 22 metres (72 ft). They prefer depressions and holes near shore.

Spotfin croaker travel considerably, but with no definite pattern. They move extensively from bay to bay. For example, fish tagged in Los Angeles Harbor were later taken as far south as Oceanside; spotfin tagged in Newport Bay moved to Alamitos Bay and vice versa.

Spotfin croakers eat a wide variety of food items, such as bivalves (clams and mussels,) marine worms, and extensively feed on small crustaceans. Adults have also been observed eating brittle stars and sea stars. Larval fish eat invertebrate eggs and zooplankton. They use the large pavement-like pharyngeal (throat) teeth to crush their food.

== Reproduction ==
Male spotfin croakers first mature and spawn when two years old and about 9 inches (23 cm) long. Most females mature when three years old and 12.5 inches (32 cm) long. All are mature by the time they are four years old and have reached a size of 14.5 inches (37 cm). The spawning season runs from June to September and may take place offshore, since no ripe fish have been caught in the surf zone. (Juveniles of 1 inch (2.5 cm) appear in the surf in the fall.)

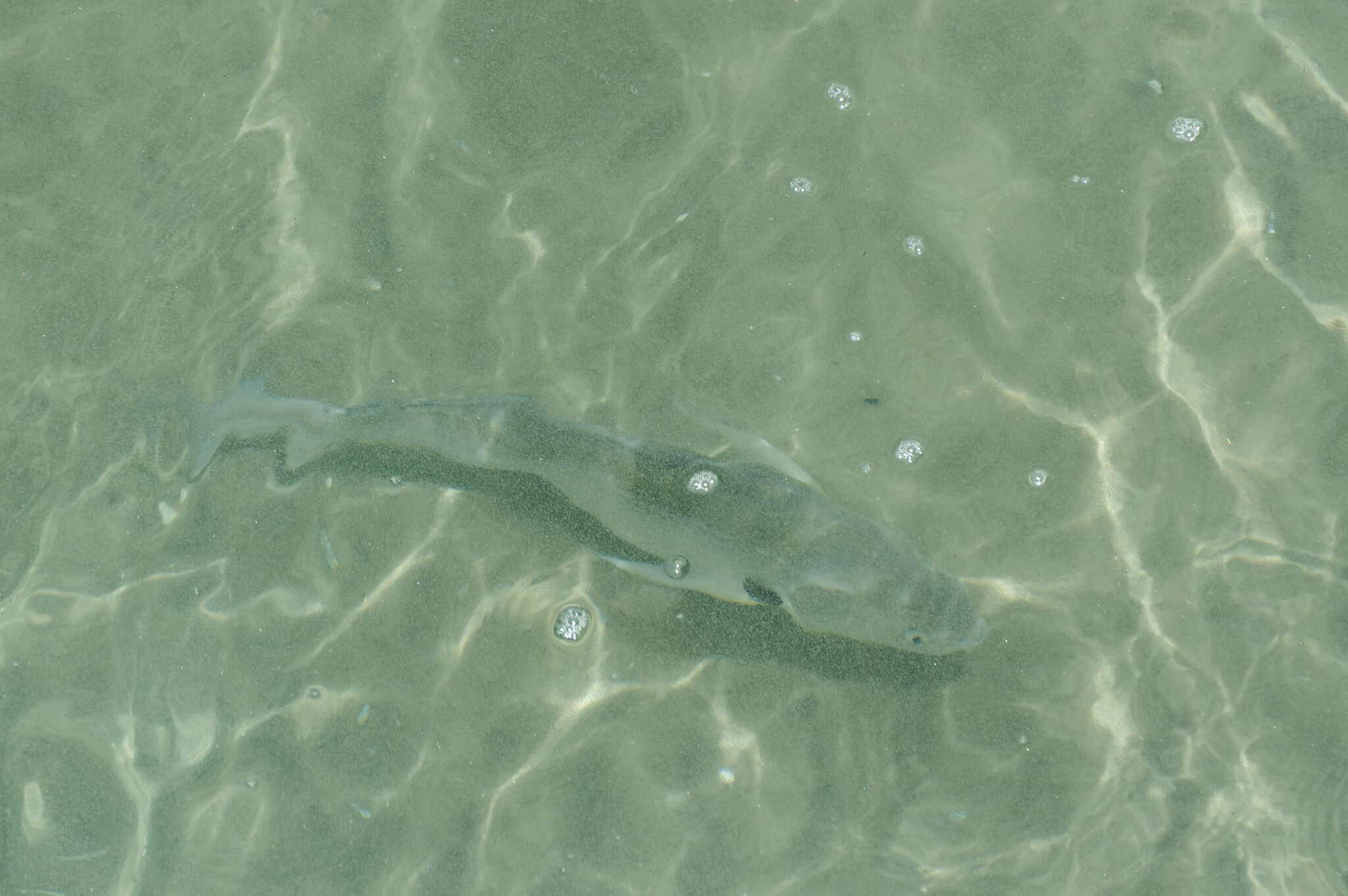
A spotfin croaker swimming, with the distinctive black spot visible

== Fishing information ==
Although some are caught throughout the year, late summer is best for spotfin croaker fishing. Near dawn and dusk are often the most productive times to target this fish. Good fishing seems to depend on runs (when the fish are actively searching for food.) When a "croaker hole" is found and a run is on, good fishing can be had by all present whether in a bay, from a pier or in the surf. Commercial fishing for the species is prohibited, yet they are very commonly taken in recreational fisheries.

Here are excerpts on historical spotfin croaker fishing from an article by Ed Reis "Crazy Croakers" in the August 2010 issue of Pacific Coast Sportfishing:

"Croakers do not get much ink in the fishing news these days, but there was a time when they were a major item in newspaper catch reports (in Southern California). A hundred years ago they were incredibly abundant and drew the attention of many pier and surf fishermen,....

"...Spotfins ... furnished wide-open action when schooled up in "croaker holes" along the beaches or near piers. I enjoyed some fabulous encounters as a youngster fishing at Santa Monica. The wooden sand groin nearest the beach home of actress Marion Davies was a productive spot, as were the coastal inlets and estuaries.

"Mission Bay at San Diego was once famous for its spotfin fishing, but since its transformation by dredging and the huge increase in watercraft traffic, there is not much doing with spotfins these days. In the 1950s I had great luck at Imperial Beach, both in the surf and in the backwater sloughs. San Onofre was a destination for weekend campers, dedicated to surf fishing in the legendary croaker holes found there. Newport's bay was also renowned for it croakers. For whatever reason, spotfins are seldom found in San Diego's big bay, and after 11 years of concentrated bay fishing, I have taken only one.

"They favor clams, mussels, and worms for food and grow to over nine pounds in weight. Large males assume a brassy color during spawning and were called "golden croakers" and thought by some old-timers to be a separate species..."
