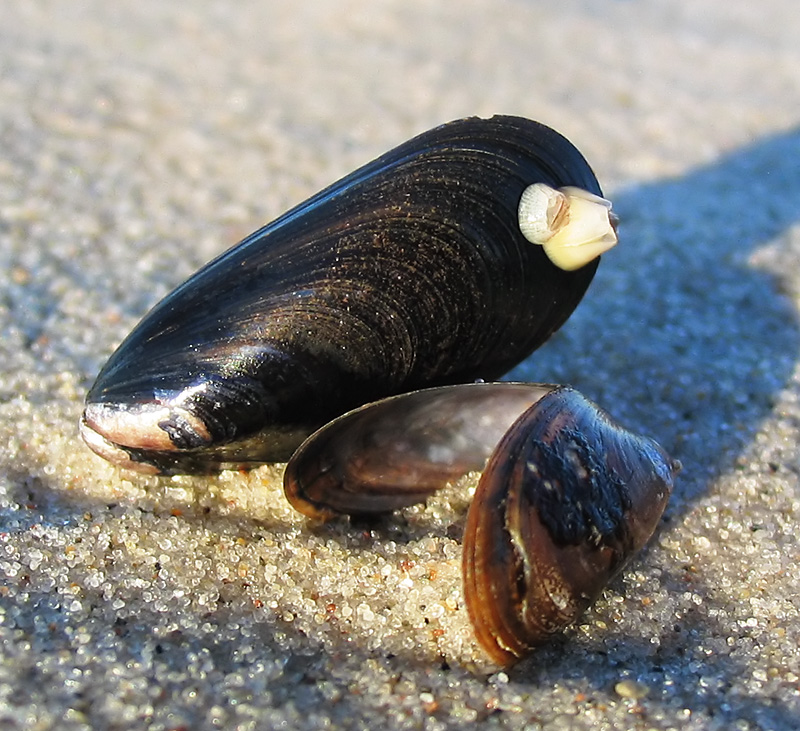
- Two shells of Mytilus edulis washed up on a beach

Scientific classification
- Kingdom: Animalia
- Phylum: Mollusca
- Class: Bivalvia
- Order: Mytilida
- Superfamily: Mytiloidea; Rafinesque, 1815

= Mytiloidea =

Superfamily of bivalves

Mytiloidea are a superfamily of small to large saltwater mussels, marine bivalve molluscs in the order Mytilida.

Mytiloidea contains two families, Mysideiellidae, which is known only from fossils and Mytilidae, which has living representatives.
