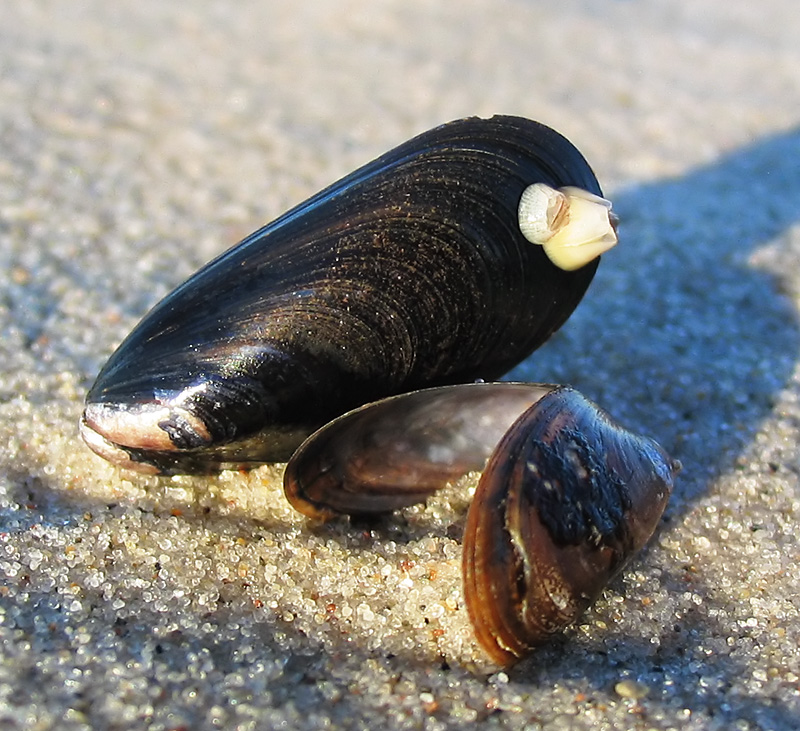
- Two shells of Mytilus edulis washed up on a beach

Scientific classification
- Kingdom: Animalia
- Phylum: Mollusca
- Class: Bivalvia
- Order: Mytilida
- Superfamily: Mytiloidea
- Family: Mytilidae; Rafinesque, 1815

Genera
- 32, See text

= Mytilidae =

Family of bivalves

The Mytilidae are a family of small to large marine and brackish-water bivalve molluscs in the order Mytilida. One of the genera, Limnoperna, inhabits freshwater environments. Mytilidae, which contains some 52 genera, is the only extant family within the order Mytilida.

Species in the family Mytilidae are found worldwide, but they are more abundant in colder seas, where they often form uninterrupted beds on rocky shores in the intertidal zone and the shallow subtidal. The subfamily Bathymodiolinae is found in deep-sea habitats.

Mytilids include the well-known, edible sea mussels.

A common feature of the shells of mussels is an asymmetrical shell, which has a thick, adherent periostracum. The animals attach themselves to a solid substrate using a byssus.

A 2020 study of the phylogeny of the Mytilidae recovered two main clades derived from an epifaunal ancestor, with subsequent lineages shifting to other lifestyles, and correlating convergent evolution of siphon traits.

== Subfamilies and genera ==
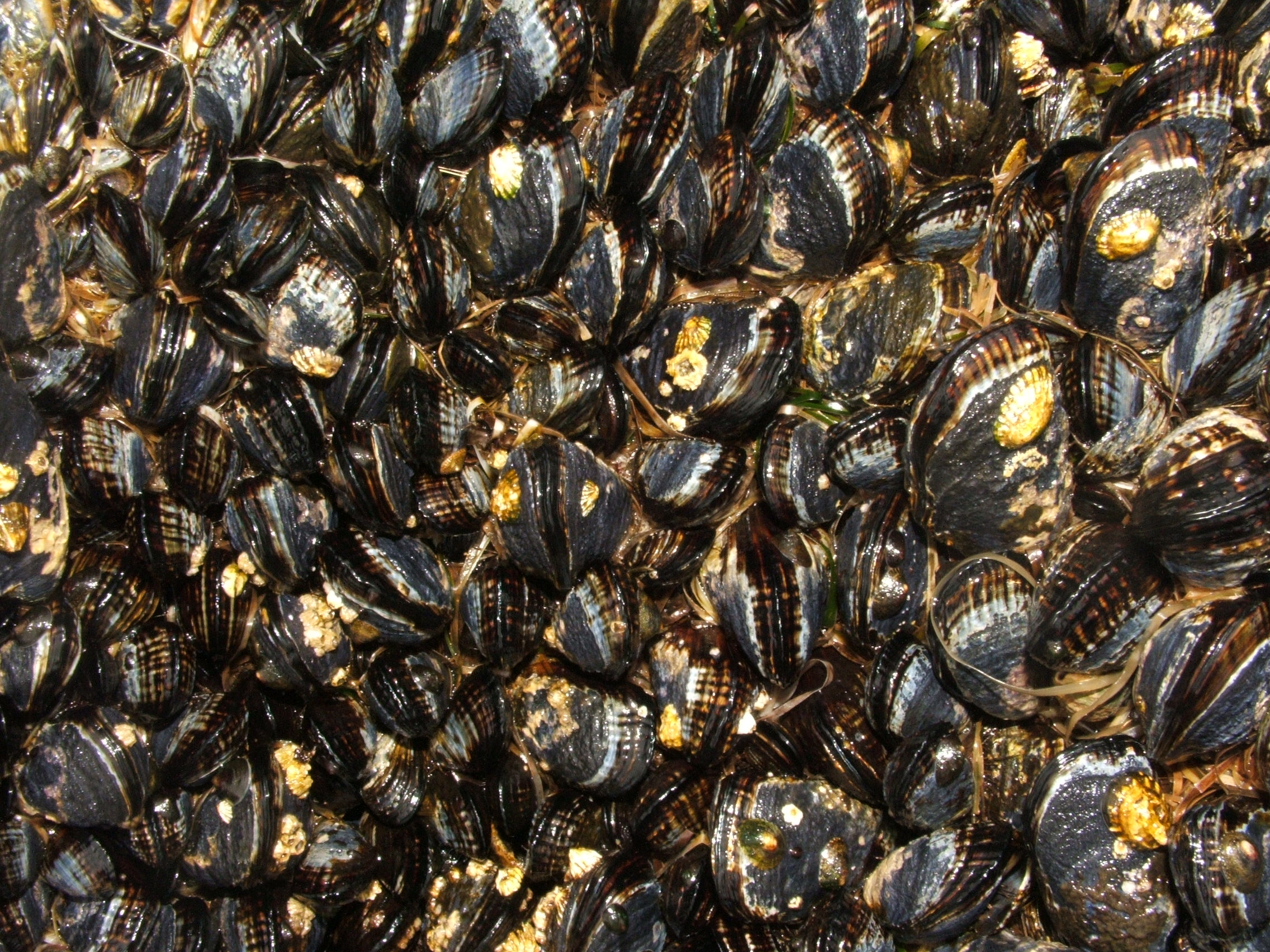
A bed of the edible California mussel, Mytilus californianus

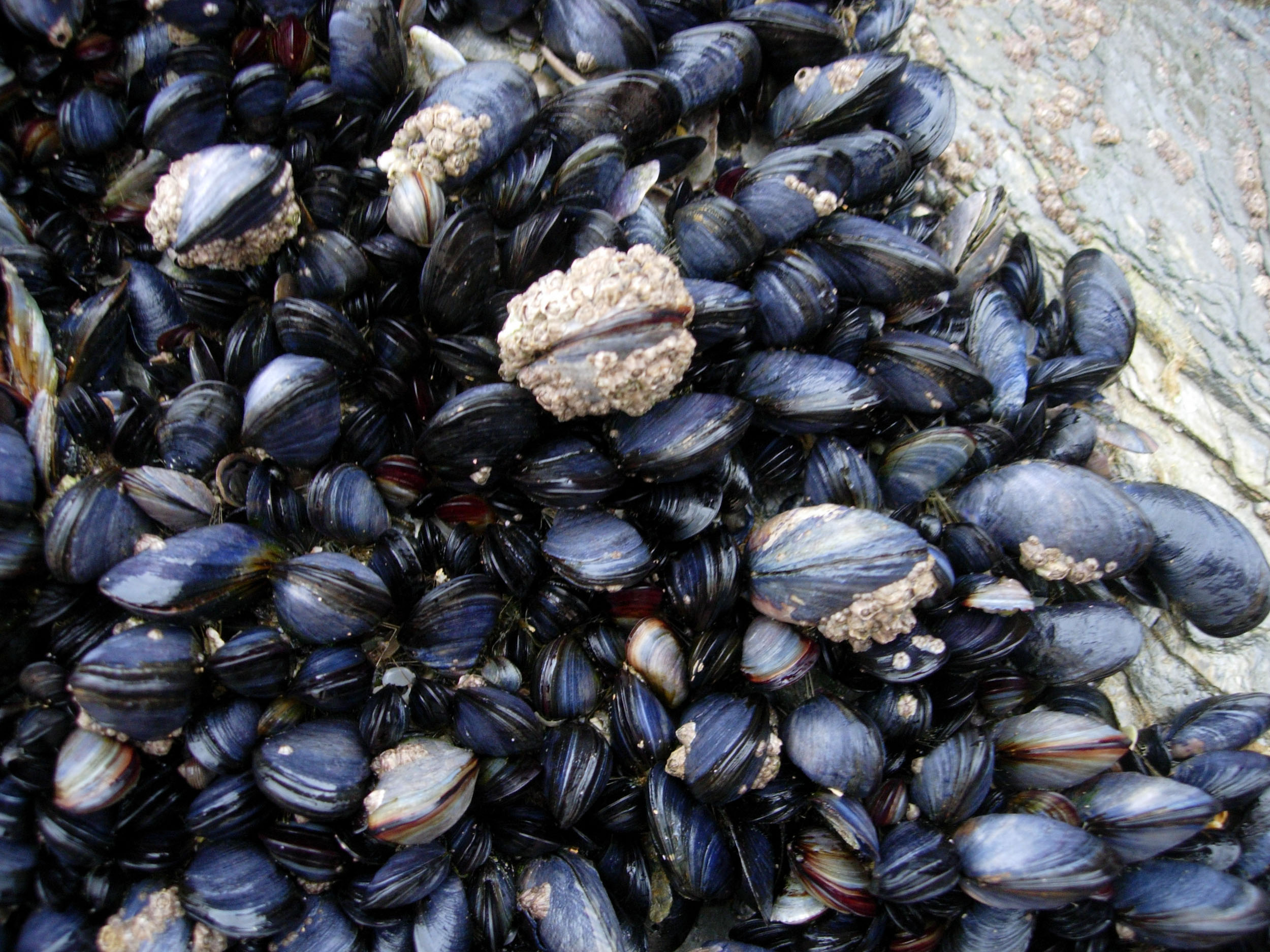
Mussels and attached barnacles on the Cornish coast near Newquay

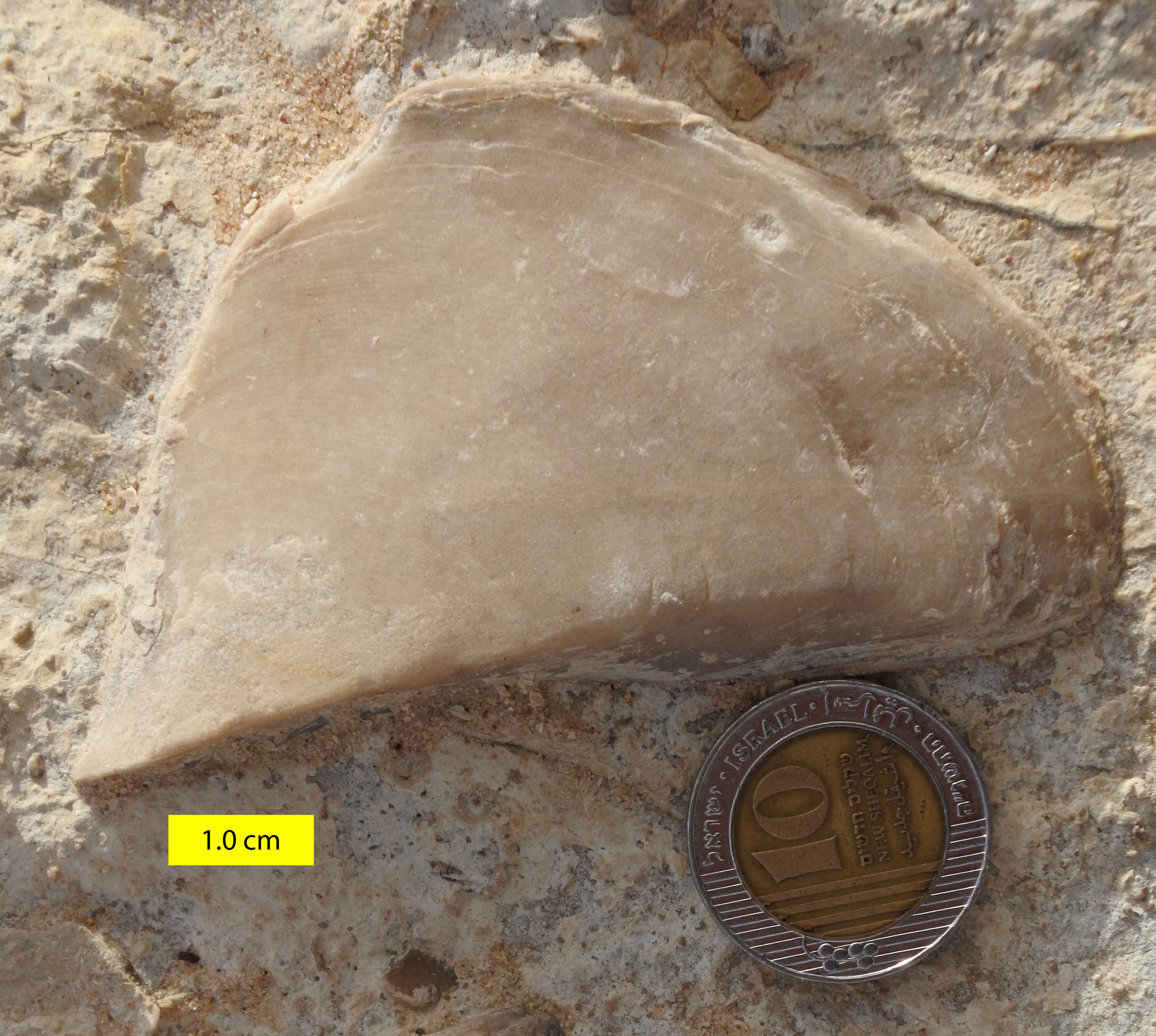
Mytilus (Falcimytilus) jurensis from the Middle Jurassic (Callovian) Matmor Formation of southern Israel

As of March 2025, the World Register of Marine Species accepts 32 genera split into eight subfamilies.

=== Subfamily Brachidontinae ===
- Brachidontes Swainson, 1840
- Geukensia Van de Poel, 1959
- Ischadium Jukes-Browne, 1905
- Mytilaster Monterosato, 1883

=== Subfamily Crenellinae ===
- †Arcoperna Conrad, 1865
- Arcuatula Jousseaume, 1919
- Arvella Scarlato, 1960
- Choromytilus T. Soot-Ryen, 1952
- Crenella T. Brown, 1827
- Exosiperna Iredale, 1929
- Musculus Röding, 1798
- Mytella T. Soot-Ryen, 1955
- Parabrachidontes K. S. Tan, S. H. M. Tan, Sanpanich, Duangdee & Ambarwati, 2024
- Perna Philipsson, 1788
- Rhomboidella Monterosato, 1884
- †Semimodiola Cossmann, 1887
- Solamen Iredale, 1924
- Vilasina Scarlato, 1960

=== Subfamily Dacrydiinae ===
- Dacrydium Torell, 1859

=== Subfamily Lithophaginae ===
- Lithophaga Röding, 1798

=== Subfamily Mytilinae ===
- Adula H. Adams & A. Adams, 1857
- Crenomytilus T. Soot-Ryen, 1955
- Dentimodiolus Iredale, 1939
- Gregariella Monterosato, 1883
- Mytilus Linnaeus, 1758
- †Praemytilus F. W. Anderson & L. R. Cox, 1948
- Trichomya Ihering, 1900

=== Subfamily Mytiliseptinae ===
- Austromytilus Laseron, 1956
- Mytilisepta T. Habe, 1951
- Perumytilus Olsson, 1961
- Semimytilus T. Soot-Ryen, 1955

=== Subfamily Septiferinae ===
- Septifer Récluz, 1848

=== †Subfamily Xenomytilinae ===
- †Lycettia L. R. Cox, 1937
- †Xenomytilus Squires & Saul, 2006

=== Incertae sedis ===
- †Admytilus Berezovsky, 2015
- Amygdalum Megerle von Mühlfeld, 1811
- †Arcomytilus Agassiz, 1842
- †Assytilus Berezovsky, 2015
- Aulacomya Mörch, 1853
- †Cuneolus Stephenson, 1941
- †Inoperna Conrad, 1873
- †Limnolycettia C. M. Kolesnikov, 1980
- †Mauricia G. D. Harris, 1919
- †Mysidioptera Salomon, 1895
- †Mytilosootus Stilwell & Zinsmeister, 1992
- †Paramusculus Kadolsky, 1989
- †Promytilus Newell, 1942
- †Regulifer Fürsich & Werner, 1988
- †Rhynchomytilus Rollier, 1914
- †Samiolus Kiel & Taviani, 2017
- Urumella Hayami & Kase, 1993
- †Volsellina Newell, 1942
