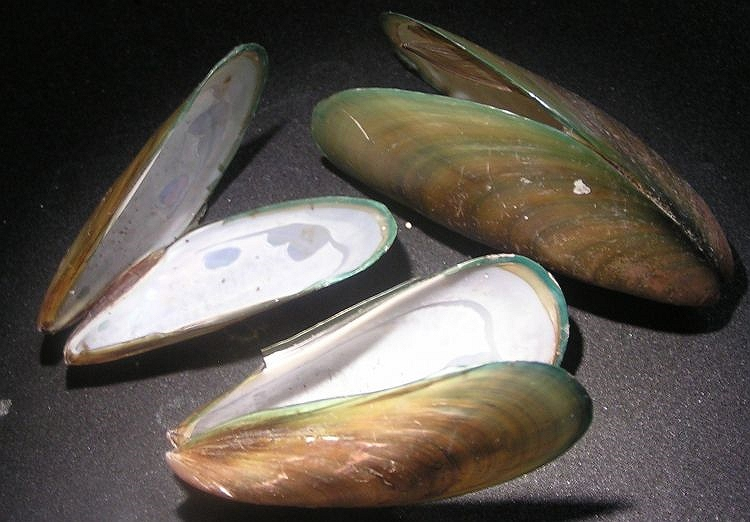
- Three shells of Perna viridis

Scientific classification
- Kingdom: Animalia
- Phylum: Mollusca
- Class: Bivalvia
- Subclass: Pteriomorphia
- Order: Mytilida

Superfamilies
- †Modiolopsoidea; Mytiloidea

Synonyms
- Mytiloida

= Mytilida =

Order of bivalves

Mytilida is an order of marine bivalve molluscs, commonly known as true mussels. There is one extant superfamily, the Mytiloidea, with a single extant family, the Mytilidae.

Species in the order Mytilida are found worldwide, but they are more abundant in colder seas, where they often form uninterrupted beds on rocky shores in the intertidal zone and the shallow subtidal. The subfamily Bathymodiolinae is found in deep-sea habitats.

Mytilids include the well-known edible sea mussels.

A common feature of the shells of mussels is an asymmetrical shell that has a thick, adherent periostracum. The animals attach themselves to a solid substrate using a byssus.

== Taxonomy ==
The following is the phylogenetic tree based on complete mitochondrial genomes per Liu et al. (2019):

- - - Ostreida
    - Pteriida
  - - Mytilida
    - Arcida
- Pectinida

In 2010, a new proposed classification system for the Bivalvia was published by Bieler, Carter & Coan. This included the suborder Mytiloida.

- Superfamily †Modiolopsoidea
  - Family †Colpomyidae
  - Family †Modiolopsidae
  - Family †Saffordiidae
- Superfamily Mytiloidea
  - Family †Mysideiellidae
  - Family Mytilidae
