= Podpeč Limestone =

Geological formation in Slovenia

Podbukovje Formation
- Stratigraphic range: Hettangian-Toarcian 201–175 Ma
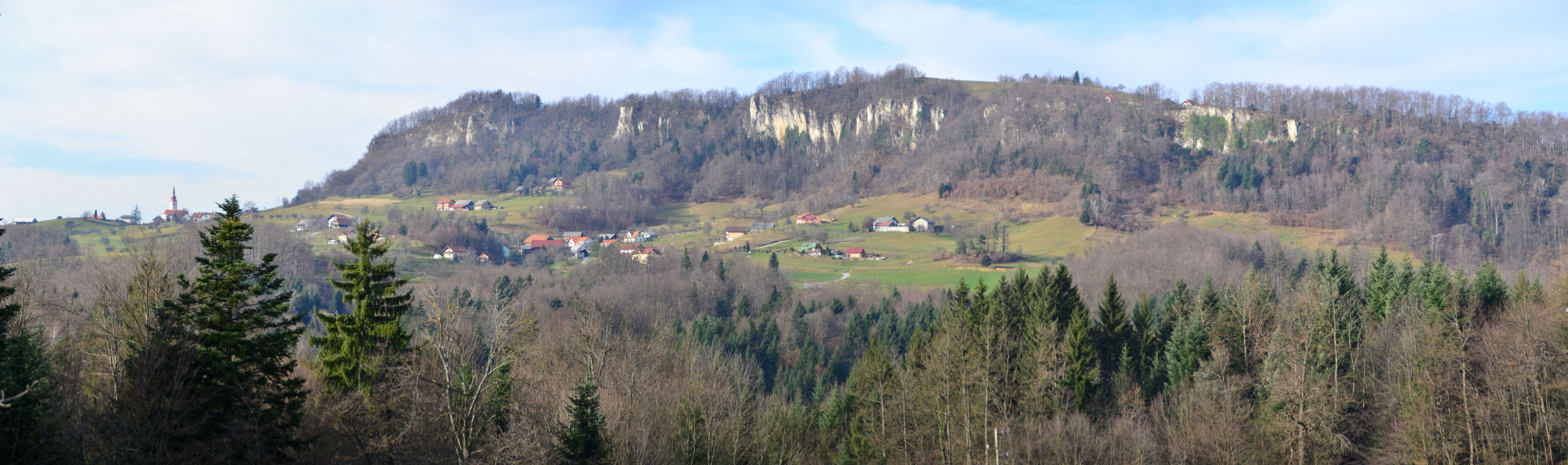
- Podpeč area with the limestone in the background
- Type: Geological formation
- Sub-units: Krka limestone member; Orbitopsella beds member; Lithiotis limestone member; Spotted limestone member
- Underlies: Laze Formation
- Overlies: Main Dolomite
- Area: Dry Carniola
- Thickness: >550 m

Lithology
- Primary: limestone

Location
- Location: Central Slovenia
- Coordinates: 46.0°N 14.4°E
- Region: Dinaric Carbonate Platform
- Country: Slovenia

Type section
- Thickness at type section: ~275 m (902 ft)
- Podpeč Limestone (Slovenia)

The Podbukovje Formation (also known as Podpeč Limestone and Predole Beds) is a geological formation that covers the whole Early Jurassic (Hettangian-Toarcian) age in Dry Carniola, central Slovenia. The total thickness of the carbonate succession in the Podbukovje Formation is approximately 550 meters. It outcrops in a roughly 1.5 km wide belt, extending northwest-southeast along the right bank of the Krka River from Velika Ilova Gora to Zagradec and slightly beyond. The most complete and typical section of this formation is developed between Krka and Podbukovje, extending south to Luze. This unit represents the major depositional record of the Adriatic Carbonate platform (and more or less to the margin of Greater Adria), being known for its shallow marine-lagoon deposits and its bivalve biota, that are abundant enough to give the vulgar name to this unit sometimes in literature as the "Lithiotis Horizon". Is a regional ecological equivalent to the Veneto Rotzo Formation, the Montenegro Seoca Lithiotis Limestone or the Moroccan Aganane Formation. Its regional equivalents include the hemipelagic Krikov Formation at the Tolmin basin.

== Cultural Importance ==
Ljubljana University Library was built using, among others Podpeč limestone

The "Podpeč Limestone" extracted from the Lithiotis limestone member has been used since Roman times in Slovenia, with artefacts crafted from this stone including funerary markers, altars, and boundary stones. The limestone was transported along the Ljubljanica river to Emona (now Ljubljana), where it featured prominently in major Roman structures. When the Roman Empire fell in the 5th century AD, stone extraction at Podpeč ceased for centuries.

Archaeological findings in Emona showed this limestone was valued for its durability, in contrast to the less resilient sandstones, like the ones from Ljubljana Castle. It was also favored due to the accessibility of the quarries by redirecting the Ljubljanica River within a kilometer, facilitating transport.

Interest in Podpeč Limestone remained minimal until around 1850, aside from a few historical buildings, such as a church portal from the 15th century. However, the stone gained popularity by the late 19th and early 20th centuries, leading to its use in various architectural elements like sills, lintels, and door frames in Ljubljana. It also became popular for monuments, fountains, and religious artifacts. The quarry remained active until production ceased in 1967, with the limestone also crushed for roadwork and shipped as blocks for stonecutting workshops.

A notable user of this limestone was by the Slovenian architect Jože Plečnik, who applied them in the construction of several iconic structures in Ljubljana, including the Central Stadium, the Faculty of Natural Sciences and Technology, the National University Library, and various churches and altars. Other notable buildings featuring this stone include the Triglav Insurance Company Palace, sections of the Slovenian Parliament, and Ljubljana skyscraper.

== Sedimentology ==
The Podbukovje Formation is a Lower Jurassic carbonate succession with concordant contacts with both the underlying Main Dolomite and the overlying Laze Formation (Aalenian). The transition between members is gradual but marked by lithological changes. The lowermost member is the Krka Limestone with a thickness of 410 m, made up of dark gray to black, medium-gray micritic, biomikritic, pelsparitic, and intrasparitic limestones. It also contains fenestral limestones, stromatolitic limestones, and occasional dolomites. It represented a mix of shallow marine, tidal and intertidal settings, similar to the older Dachstein Formation and Main Dolomite. The next member, the Foraminifera-rich Orbitopsella-Bearing Layers (60 m) represent periodically restricted shallow marine lagoonal to tidal flats, with a lithology dominated by bioosparitic, biomikritic, and intraoosparitic limestones with bituminous dolomites. The next sequence is represented by the Bivalve-rich "Lithiotid" Limestone (40 m) made up of dark gray, biomikritic and biosparitic limestones, containing lithiotid bivalves that lived in a calm, shallow marine lagoonal setting, forming meadows. The youngest member, the Spotted Limestone (~20-40 m) is made of light gray to medium gray, oosparitic and biointrasparitic and thin-bedded, micritic limestone with red and orange-red iron ooids. deposited in an environment evolving from a very shallow, high-energy carbonate platform with open-marine influence to a low-energy, restricted shelf setting with episodic iron precipitation.

== Paleoenvironment ==
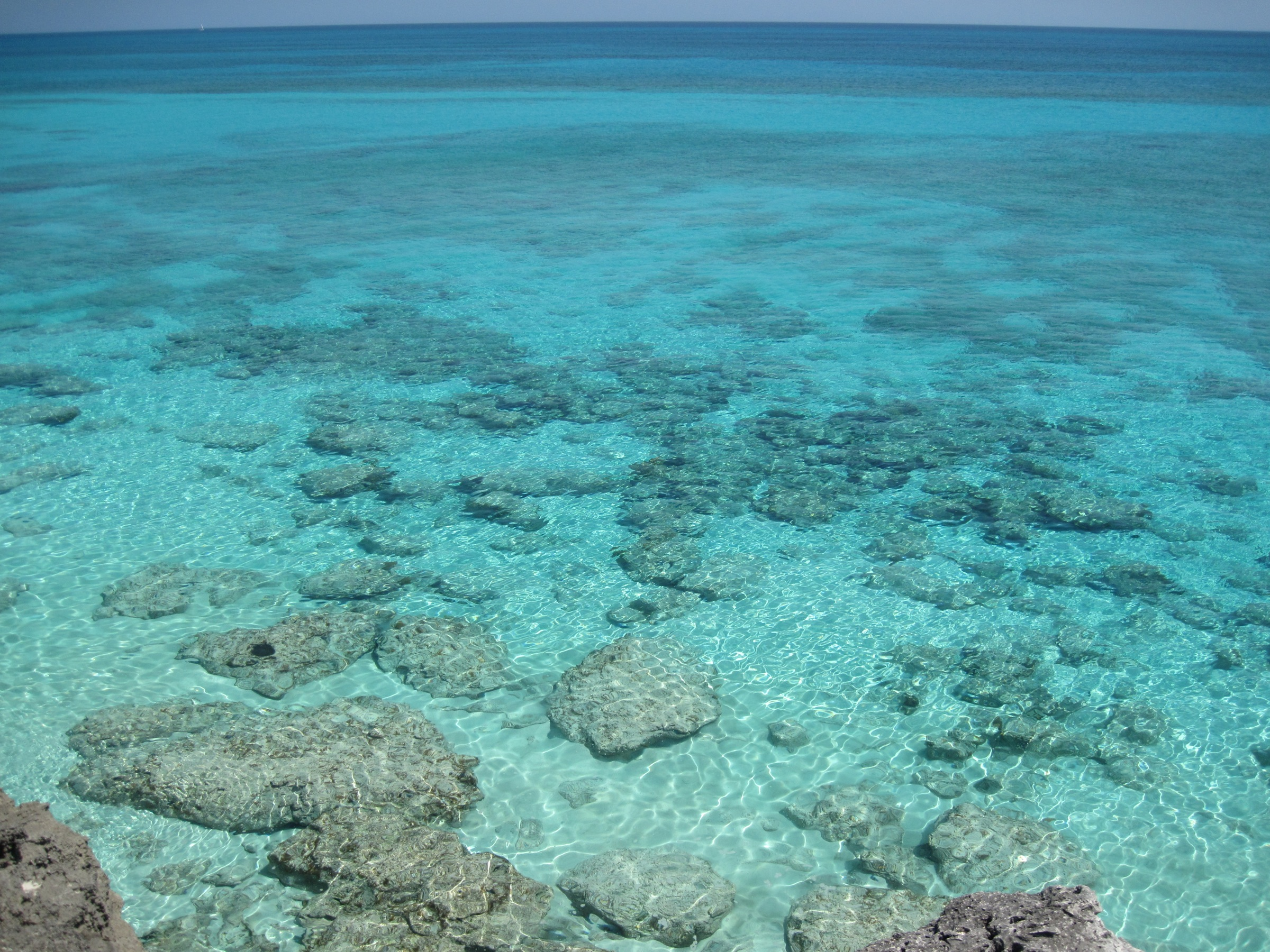
The Podbukovje Fm records a shallow Carbonate Platform sea, similar to modern Bahamas

In Slovenia, the northeastern margin of the Adriatic Platform displays a range of Lower Jurassic carbonate deposits, prominently seen from Tolmin through Vrhnika, Novo Mesto, Krško, and into the Gorjanci region. These deposits are characterized by well-layered, dark platform carbonates, including interbedded mudstones, fossiliferous wackestones, oolitic grainstones, and later-stage diagenetic dolomites. This Slovenian carbonate sequence is comparable to those observed in adjacent regions like Croatia and Bosnia. Hettangian-Sinemurian layers typically consist of white-grey, dense limestone, with some regions containing white carnous dolomite and in areas such as Hrušica and Notranjsko, dark grey, coarse-grained, bituminous dolomites are observed. The Pliensbachian facies are characterized by black, dense limestones that sometimes transition to black bituminous dolomite.

The Lowermost Jurassic (Hettangian-Sinemurian) limestone sequences formed in a shallow marine setting, including subtidal, intertidal, and supratidal environments. The Pliensbachian saw dynamic environmental conditions, with sedimentation in Dry Carniola strongly influenced by tidal and wave activity, leading to poorly sorted carbonate grains and cross-bedding structures. Fossil-rich deposits indicate that the region was part of a vast, interconnected shallow marine platform. Water circulation with the open sea allowed for the formation of sparitic and ruditic carbonates, favorable for lithiotids and other macro-organisms.

Later, Toarcian deposits show evidence of a calmer shelf or lagoon environment, characterized by thinly bedded, fine-grained limestones, micrites, and pelmicrites. The presence of mud-supported breccias and conglomerates suggests occasional higher-energy events, possibly linked to storms or tidal currents.

Throughout the wider Adriatic Carbonate Platform in Slovenia and beyond, the transition to Toarcian carbonates shows a reduction in significant fossils, a trend also noted in the Croatian and Bosnian sections.

The Podbukovje type profile revelated a 75-meter-thick limestone sequence rich in diverse types, including micritic, bioclastic, and ooidal limestone, interspersed with marl, specially within the lower layers, while tectonic activity is evident in the upper sections. The distinctive dark grey to black limestone is highly valued for its aesthetic appeal, marked by white fossilized bivalves. This limestone, known as a "lumachella," formed under low-oxygen lagoonal conditions and contains abundant Lithiotis-type bivalves. Faces similar to those at Preserje near Borovnica indicate littoral zones with alternating subtidal and supratidal conditions, similar to the present-day Bahamas, with occasional high-energy oolitic limestone beds reflecting dynamic water flow.

During the Lower Jurassic, southern Slovenia was part of the Dinaric Carbonate Platform, a shallow marine environment adjacent to the deep-sea Slovenian Basin to the north and stretching into what is now Croatia. The Julian Carbonate Platform lay further north across the basin. Due to the depth of the basin, species exchange between the Dinaric and Julian platforms was unlikely. However, the narrowing of the Slovenian Basin near central Soča Valley may have allowed direct contact between these platforms.

Within the Dinaric Platform, shallow, turbulent waters shaped the limestone formations, forming breccias and oolitic sands that built up into beaches and dunes. Coral reefs served as barriers, protecting southern lagoonal areas rich in organic material, where limited oxygen levels facilitated the formation of bituminous rock layers. Salinity fluctuations, caused by alternating drought and rainfall periods, drove dolomitization, transforming the sediments. The presence of tropical fossils, including Mytilus-like bivalves and land plants, as well as rare coal beds, indicates intermittent swampy land islands.

The fossil record across these layers is diverse, preserving bivalves, gastropods, brachiopods, foraminifera, algae, and occasional coral. A rimmed carbonate platform model is proposed for the Podpeč region, positioning it near the oolitic platform margin with a sheltered lagoon landward characterized by low-energy, mud-rich limestone. Neighboring areas like Trnovski Gozd share these conditions, while sites like Kočevje and Suha krajina reveal lithiotid dolomite layers, breccias, and coal-bearing deposits from marshy environments. While some propose a ramp model, evidence such as cortoids and aggregate grains, as well as frequent emersion events, supports the rimmed platform model and a stable paleogeographic setting.

This area, part of the ancient Adriatic plate, once lay in a tropical belt at lower latitudes, later shifting northward to its present location.

== Fossil Content ==
Color key: Taxon / Reclassified taxon / Taxon falsely reported as present / Dubious taxon or junior synonym / Ichnotaxon / Ootaxon / Morphotaxon	Notes; Uncertain or tentative taxa are in small text; ~~crossed out~~ taxa are discredited.

=== Foraminifera ===
Genus	Species	Location	Material	Notes	Images
Aeolisaccus	A. dunningtoni	Radensko polje; Zalopate section; Grad section	Isolated tests/shells	A foraminifer of the Earlandiidae family	
Agerina	A. martana	Radensko polje; Zalopate section; Grad section	Isolated tests/shells	A foraminifer of the Cornuspiridae family	
Amijiella	A. amiji	Radensko polje; Zalopate section; Grad section	Isolated tests/shells	A foraminifer of the Hauraniidae family	
Bosniella	B. oenensis	Podpeč; Zalopate section; Grad section	Isolated tests/shells	A foraminifer of the Biokovinidae family	
Coronipora	C.? sp.	Podpeč; Zalopate section; Grad section	Isolated tests/shells	A foraminifer of the Trocholinidae family	
Dentalina	D. ssp.	Krim Mountain	Isolated tests/shells	A foraminifer of the family Notosariidae.	
Duotaxis	D. metula	Podpeč; Zalopate section; Grad section	Isolated tests/shells	A foraminifer of the Verneuilinoidinae family	
Everticyclammina	E. praevirguliana	Podpeč; Zalopate section; Grad section	Isolated tests/shells	A foraminifer of the Everticyclamminidae family.	
Glomospira	G. sp.	Podpeč; Zalopate section; Grad section	Isolated tests/shells	A foraminifer of the family Ammodiscidae.	
Haplophragmoides	H. ssp.	Krim Mountain	Isolated tests/shells	A foraminifer of the family Haplophragmoididae.	
Haurania	H. amiji; H. deserta; H. ssp.	Podpeč; Radensko polje; Zalopate section; Grad section	Isolated tests/shells	A foraminifer of the family Hauraniinae.	
Involutina	I. farinacciae	Radensko polje; Zalopate section; Grad section; Kanin mountain	Isolated tests/shells	A foraminifer of the Involutinidae family	
Lituosepta	L. recoarensis; L. compressa; L. sp.var.B; L. ssp.	Podpeč; Radensko polje; Zalopate section; Grad section	Isolated tests/shells	A foraminifer of the Mesoendothyridae family.	
Lituolipora	L. termieri	Podpeč; Zalopate section; Grad section	Isolated tests/shells	A foraminifer of the Mayncinidae family	
Meandrovoluta	M. asiagoensis	Podpeč; Zalopate section; Grad section	Isolated tests/shells	A foraminifer of the Cornuspiridae family	
Mesoendothyra	M.? "sp.A"	Podpeč; Zalopate section; Grad section	Isolated tests/shells	A foraminifer of the Mesoendothyridae family.	
Orbitopsella	O. primaeva; O. preacursor; O. spp.	Podpeč; Radensko polje; Zalopate section; Grad section	Isolated tests/shells	A foraminifer of the Mesoendothyridae family.	
Ophtalmidium	O. concentricum; O. sp.	Podpeč; Krim Mountain; Radensko polje; Zalopate section; Grad section	Isolated tests/shells	A foraminifer of the family Ophthalmidiidae.	
Paleomayncina	P. termieri	Krim Mountain; Podpeč; Zalopate section; Grad section	Isolated tests/shells	A foraminifer of the Planiseptinae family.	
Planisepta	P. compressa	Radensko polje	Isolated tests/shells	A foraminifer of the Planiseptinae family.	
Pseudocyclammina	P. liasica; P. lituus; P. spp.	Podpeč; Radensko polje; Zalopate section; Grad section	Isolated tests/shells	A foraminifer of the Pfenderinidae family.	
Pseudopfenderina	P. butterlini	Podpeč; Zalopate section; Grad section	Isolated tests/shells	A foraminifer of the Pseudopfenderininae family.	
Siphovalvulina	S. gibraltarensis; S. variabilis; S. sp.A	Podpeč; Zalopate section; Grad section	Isolated tests/shells	A foraminifer of the Pfenderinidae family.	
Spirillina	S. ssp.	Krim Mountain	Isolated tests/shells	A foraminifer of the family Spirillinidae.	
Trocholina	T. ssp.	Krim Mountain	Isolated tests/shells	A foraminifer of the family Trocholitidae.	

=== Sponges ===
Genus	Species	Stratigraphic position	Material	Notes	Images
Stromatomorpha	S. lamellosa	Krim Mountain	Colonial imprints	A chaetetidan demosponge, member of Anthaspidellidae.	

=== Anthozoa ===
Genus	Species	Stratigraphic position	Material	Notes	Images
Actinastrea	A. plana	Krim Mountain	Colonial imprints	A scleractinian coral, member of Actinastreidae.	
Allocoeniopsis	A. dendroidea	Krim Mountain	Colonial imprints	A scleractinian coral, member of Actinastreidae.	
Archaeosmiliopsis	A. densus	Krim Mountain	Colonial imprints	A scleractinian coral, member of Zardinophyllidae.	
Cladophyllia	C. dresnayi	Gozd, Trnovski Gozd Plateau	Colonial imprints	A scleractinian coral, member of Cladophylliidae.	
Cuifastraea	C. lopatensis	Krim Mountain	Colonial imprints	A scleractinian coral, member of Cuifastraeidae.	
Dichopsammia	D. gozdensis	Gozd, Trnovski Gozd Plateau	Colonial imprints	A scleractinian coral, member of Dendrophylliidae.	
Epismilia	E. mauretaniensis	Krim Mountain	Colonial imprints	A scleractinian coral, member of Zardinophyllidae.	
Goldfussastrea	G. toarciensis	Krim Mountain	Colonial imprints	A scleractinian coral, member of Montlivaltiidae.	
Heterastraea	H. tomesi; H. angelae; H. eveshami; H. stricklandi	Gozd, Trnovski Gozd Plateau; Krim Mountain	Colonial imprints	A scleractinian coral, member of Oppelismiliidae.	
Hispaniastraea	H. ramosa	Gozd, Trnovski Gozd Plateau	Colonial imprints	A scleractinian coral, member of Hispaniastraeidae.	
Intersmilia	I. trnovensis	Gozd, Trnovski Gozd Plateau	Colonial imprints	A scleractinian coral, member of Intersmiliidae.	
Phacelophyllia	P. fasciata; P. termieri; P. bacari	Gozd, Trnovski Gozd Plateau	Colonial imprints	A scleractinian coral, member of Oppelismiliidae.	
Rhabdophyllia	R. phaceloida	Gozd, Trnovski Gozd Plateau	Colonial imprints	A scleractinian coral, member of Montlivaltiidae.	Specimens of the same genus
Siderosmilia	S. perithecata	Krim Mountain	Colonial imprints	A scleractinian coral, member of Siderastreidae.	
Stylophyllopsis	S. veneta	Gorenja Brezovica reef	Colonial imprints	A scleractinian coral, member of Stylophyllidae	
Thecactinastraea	T. fasciculata; T. krimensis	Gozd, Trnovski Gozd Plateau; Krim Mountain	Colonial imprints	A scleractinian coral, member of Oppelismiliidae.	
Thecosmilia	T. veneta	Podpeč; Zalopate section; Grad section	Colonial imprints	A scleractinian coral, member of Montlivaltiidae.	Thecosmilia specimen

=== Brachiopoda ===
Genus	Species	Stratigraphic position	Material	Notes	Images
Hesperithyris	H. renierii	Podpeč	Isolated shells	A terebratulidan brachiopod, member of Hesperithyrididae.	
Lychnothyris	L. rotzoana	Podpeč	Isolated shells	A terebratulidan brachiopod, member of Plectoconchidae. Typical Mediterranean region taxon in the Pliensbachian, the main Branchiopod locally associated with the Lithiotids facies, where they formed rare mass occurrences at discrete intervals.	

=== Mollusca ===
Unidentified members of Pectinidae, Megalodontidae or Nerineidae are known from several locations.

Genus	Species	Stratigraphic position	Material	Notes	Images
Astarte	A. sp.	Podpeč	Isolated shells	A clam, member of Astartidae inside Carditida.	
Cochlearites	C. loppianus; C. ssp.	Grčarevec, Logatec; Stražišče Hill, Klance; Podpeč; Radensko polje; Globocec	Isolated shells; Mass accumulations of specimens	An oyster, member of Plicatostylidae inside Ostreida. A large bivalve, with a subequivalved shell, up to 60–70 cm high. It is one of the three main bivalves recovered on the Lithiotis Facies, with its accumulations generally overlying megalodontid coquinas.	Cochlearites
Durga	D. trigonalis; D. nikolisi	Podpeč; Zalopate section; Grad section	Isolated shells	A clam, member of the family Pachyrismatidae	
Gervillia	G. (Gervilleia) buchi	Podpeč; Zalopate section; Grad section	Isolated shells	A pteriid, member of the family Bakevelliidae	
Gervilleioperna	G. taramellii; G. buchi; G. timorensis; G. sp.	Špik Mountain; Grčarevec, Logatec; Podpeč; Krim Mountain; Radensko polje	Isolated shells	An oyster, member of Plicatostylidae inside Ostreida.	Gervillioperna
Lithioperna	L. (Lithiopedalion) kuehni; L. scutata; L. spp.	Špik Mountain; Podpeč; Krim Mountain; Radensko polje	Isolated shells; Mass accumulations of specimens	An oyster, member of Plicatostylidae inside Ostreida.	Lithioperna
Lithiotis	L. problematica; L. spp.	Podpeč; Krim Mountain; Radensko polje	Isolated shells; Mass accumulations of specimens	An oyster, member of Plicatostylidae inside Ostreida. A large and aberrant bivalve, its accumulations have had different denominations in literature, such as banks, bioherms, biostromes, bivalve reefs or bivalve mounds.	Lithiotis
Manticula	M. problematica	Špik Mountain	Isolated shells	An oyster, member of the family Pergamidiidae inside Ostreida.	
Mytiloperna	M. lepsii	Špik Mountain; Grčarevec, Logatec; Podpeč; Krim Mountain	Isolated shells	An oyster, member of the family Malleidae inside Ostreida.	
Opisoma	O. excavatum; O. menchikoffi; O. spp.	Podpeč; Krim Mountain	Isolated shells	A clam, member of Astartidae inside Carditida. It is considered a genus that evolved from shallow burrowing ancestors, becoming a secondarily semi-infaunal edgewise recliner adapted to photosymbiosis.	
Pachyrisma	P. (Pachymegalodon) chamaeformis	Podpeč	Isolated shells	A clam, member of the family Pachyrismatidae	
Pecten	P. norigliensis; P. ssp.	Radensko polje	Isolated shells	A scallop, member of the family Pectinidae inside Pectinida	Pecten specimens
Perna	P. taramellii	Podpeč; Zalopate section; Grad section	Isolated shells	A pteriid, member of the family Pteriidae	Perna specimens
Pholadomya	P. norigliensis	Podpeč; Zalopate section; Grad section	Isolated shells	A clam, member of the family Pholadomyidae	Specimen of the genus
Protodiceras	P. pumilum	Podpeč; Zalopate section; Grad section	Isolated shells	A clam, member of the family Megalodontidae	

=== Gastropoda ===
Genus	Species	Stratigraphic position	Material	Notes	Images
Nerinea	N. sp.	Krim Mountain	Isolated shells	A snail, member of Nerineidae inside Heterostropha.	Specimen of the genus

=== Crustacea ===
Genus	Species	Stratigraphic position	Material	Notes	Images
Favreina	F. salevensis; F. spp.	Radensko polje	Coprolites	Crustacean fossil coprolites, assigned to the ichnofamily Favreinidae. Possibly coprolites of taxa similar to modern Axiidae.	Thalassinidea Crustacean

=== Echinodermata ===
Genus	Species	Stratigraphic position	Material	Notes	Images
Pentacrinites	P. sp.	Krim Mountain	Columnnal ossicles	An crinoid, member of the family Pentacrinitidae	

=== "algae" ===
Genus	Species	Location	Material	Notes	Images
Aeolissacus	A. spp.	Podpeč	Calcified thalli	A possible green algae of the family Dasycladaceae.	
Bacinella	B. irregularis	Podpeč; Krim Mountain	Calcified specimens	A cyanobacterial alga of the family Garwoodiaceae	
Dinarella	D. kochi	Kanin mountain	Calcified specimens	A green algae of the family Dasycladaceae.	
Linoporella	L. buseri	Kanin mountain	Calcified specimens	A green algae of the family Triploporellaceae.	
Palaeodasycladus	P. fragilis; P. mediterraneus; P. dolomiticus; P. anae; P. spp.	Podpeč; Mt. Trnovski Gozd; Kanin mountain; Krim Mountain; Radensko polje	Calcified thalli	A green algae of the family Dasycladaceae. A reefal algae usually found in carbonate settings along all the Mediterranean	
Solenopora	S. liasica	Podpeč; Krim Mountain	Calcified specimens	A red alga of the family Solenoporaceae	
Thaumatoporella	T. parvovesiculifera	Podpeč; Krim Mountain	Calcified thalli	A green alga of the Thaumatoporellales group	

== See also ==
- Rotzo Formation, Italy
- Marne di Monte Serrone, Italy
- Calcare di Sogno, Italy
- Aganane Formation, Morocco
- Tafraout Group, Morocco
- Azilal Formation, Morocco
- Budoš Limestone, Montenegro
- Cañadón Asfalto Formation, Argentina
- Los Molles Formation, Argentina
- Mawson Formation, Antarctica
- Kandreho Formation, Madagascar
- Kota Formation, India
- Cattamarra Coal Measures, Australia
