= Magdalen Quarry =

Local nature reserve in Oxford, England

- Interactive map of Magdalen Quarry
- Type: Local Nature Reserve
- Location: Oxford, Oxfordshire, England
- OS grid: SP 551 071
- Coordinates: 51.76°N 1.2016°W
- Area: 0.38 hectares (0.94 acres)
- Created: December 20, 1988; 37 years ago
- Manager: Oxford City Council

Magdalen Quarry is a 0.38-hectare (0.94-acre) a Local Nature Reserve and Site of Special Scientific Interest in a former quarry in east Oxford, England.

== Geology ==
The site is a small former quarry, with an exposed rock face measuring 4 m (13 ft) high, which is noted for Late Jurassic fossils. At that time the area was covered by a warm, shallow sea, and there is evidence of a coral reef at the nearby Rock Edge nature reserve.

The upper geological layers are composed of Wheatley limestone, a member of the Stanford Formation, with some bands of a smooth limestone known as Headington hardstone running through them. Below this are shell pebble peds, and the lower layers are composed of Beckley sand.

The most common fossils found in the quarry are bivalve shell fragments and Thecosmilia (Montlivaltiidae) corals. Isastrea corals, crinoid fragments, and sea urchin spines have also been recorded at the site.

== Natural history ==
The site was designated as a local nature reserve for its biodiversity, having both wildflower meadow and wildlife hedgerow habitats. Harvest mice and water voles both inhabit the reserve.

== History ==
Magdalen Quarry originally belonged to Magdalen College, from which it takes its name. There is some evidence it was being worked as early as 1474 by Magdalen and in 1610 by Wadham College. In the 19th century it was often known as the "Workhouse Pit". At the end of that century, Oxford City Council was renting the quarry from Magdalen for road-building stone and resolved in 1899 to take ownership of it from the college, giving rise to another local name, the "Corporation Pit". It was the last quarry to be worked in Headington, closing in 1949. The site was officially declared a Local Nature Reserve on 20 December 1988.
