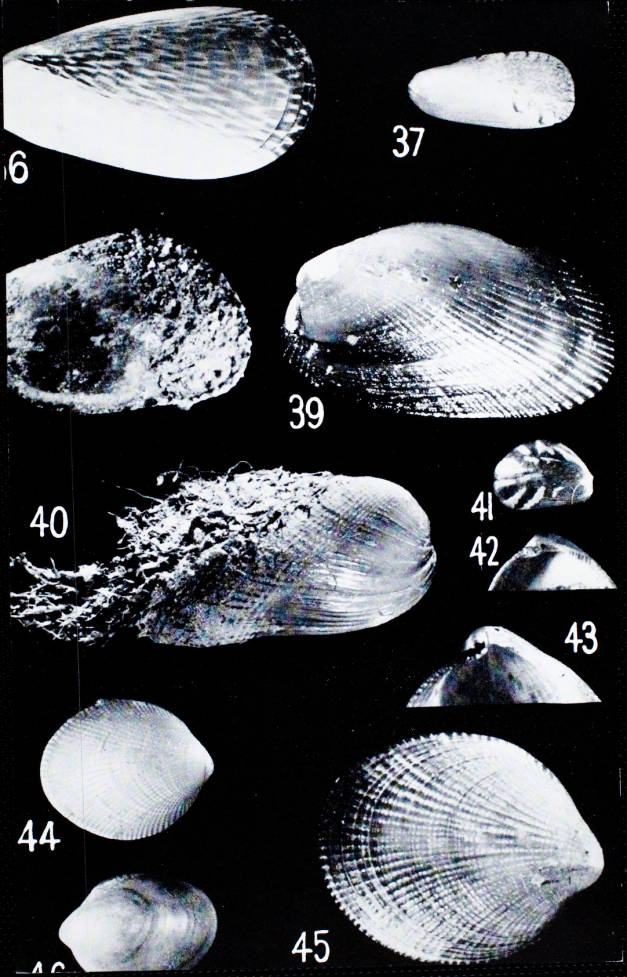

Scientific classification
- Kingdom: Animalia
- Phylum: Mollusca
- Class: Bivalvia
- Order: Mytilida
- Family: Mytilidae
- Genus: Lioberus
- Species: L. salvadoricus

Binomial name
- Lioberus salvadoricus Hertlein & A. M. Strong, 1946

Synonyms
- Volsella salvadorica (Hertlein & A. M. Strong, 1946)

= Lioberus salvadoricus =

Species of bivalve

Lioberus salvadoricus is a species of bivalve in the family Mytilidae. The scientific name of the species was first validly published in 1946 by Hertlein & Strong.
