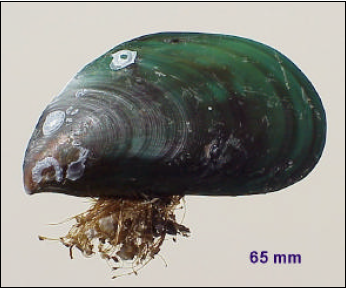
- Perna viridis showing the byssus, the downward-pointing beak, and the dark green color that becomes brownish towards the umbo

Scientific classification
- Kingdom: Animalia
- Phylum: Mollusca
- Class: Bivalvia
- Order: Mytilida
- Family: Mytilidae
- Genus: Perna
- Species: P. viridis

Binomial name
- Perna viridis (Linnaeus, 1758)

Synonyms
- Chloromya smaragdinus Jukes-Browne, 1905; Chloromya viridis Dodge, 1952; Mytilus opalus Lamarck, 1819; Mytilus smaragdinus Chemnitz, 1785; Mytilus viridis Linnaeus, 1758

= Perna viridis =

Asian green mussel

Species of bivalve

Perna viridis, known as the Asian green mussel, is an economically important species of mussel, a bivalve belonging to the family Mytilidae, or the "true mussels". It is harvested for food, but can harbor toxins and cause damage to submerged structures such as drainage pipes. It is native to the Asia-Pacific region, but has been introduced in the Caribbean, and in the waters around Japan, North America, and South America.

== Description ==
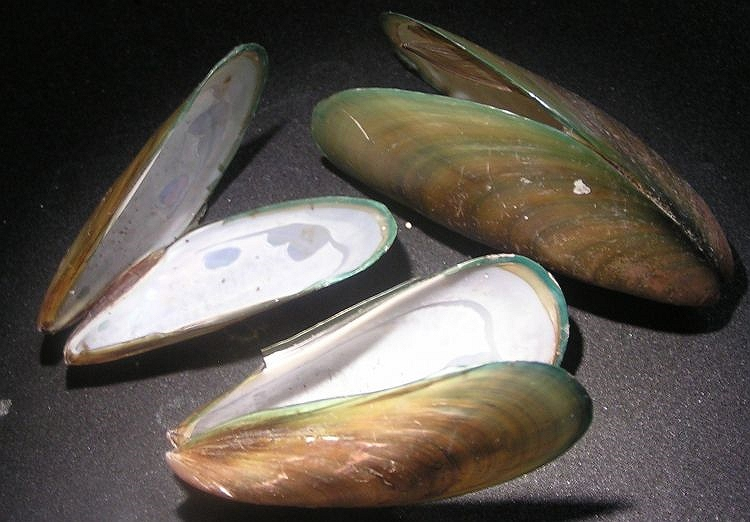
Perna viridis

Perna viridis ranges from 80 to 100 millimetres (3 to 4 in) in length and may occasionally reach 165 millimetres (6 in). Its shell ends in a downward-pointing beak. The smooth periostracum is dark green, becoming increasingly brownish towards its point of attachment (umbo), where it is lighter. Younger mussels are bright green and that becomes darker as it ages. The shell's interior has a pale-blue sheen.

The mussel has a large mobile foot which it uses to climb vertically, should it be covered by sediments. It also produces byssus to help it attach to its substrate.

Perna canaliculus and Perna perna are two similar species, native to the waters of New Zealand and Africa respectively.

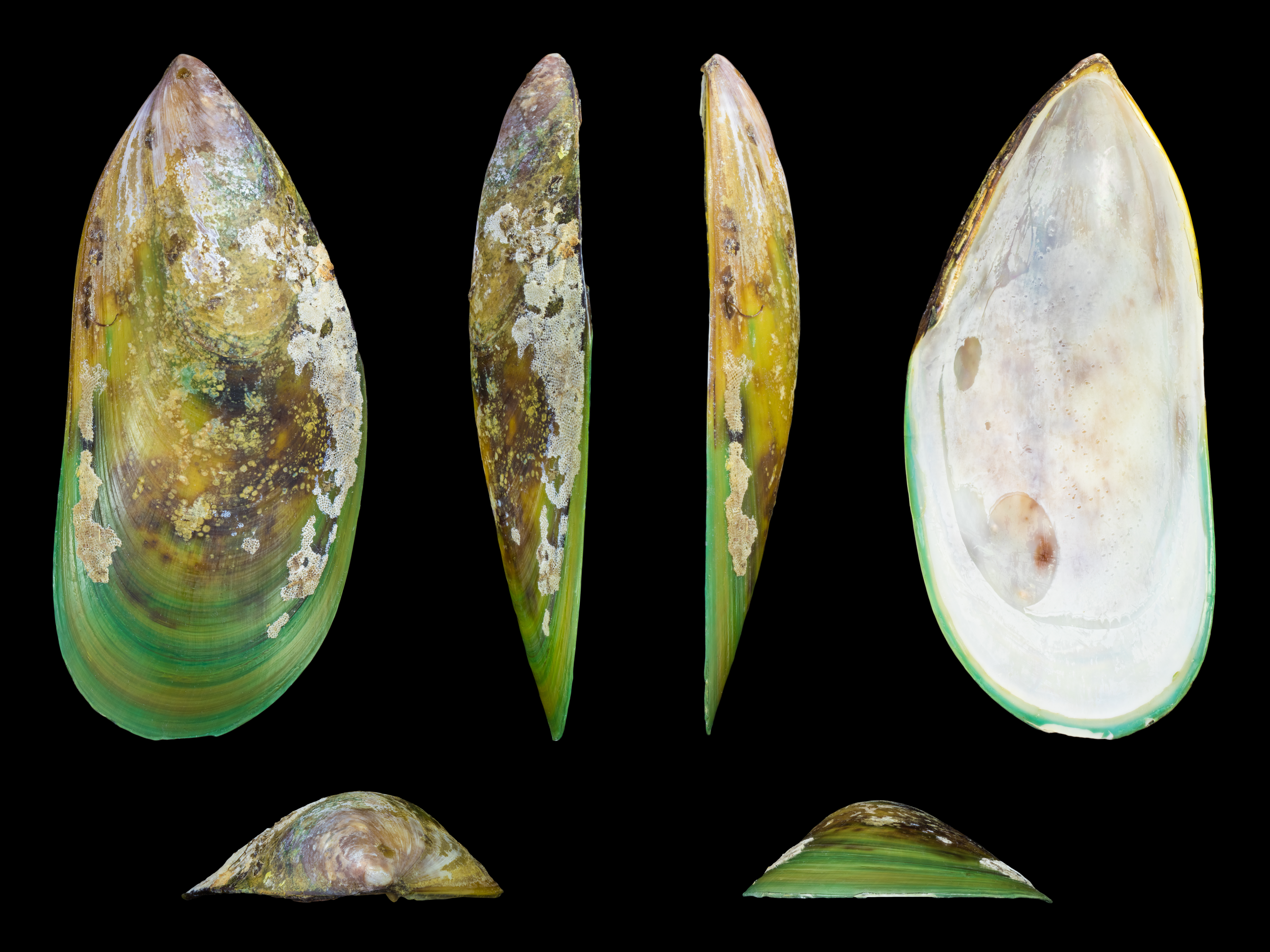
Left valve

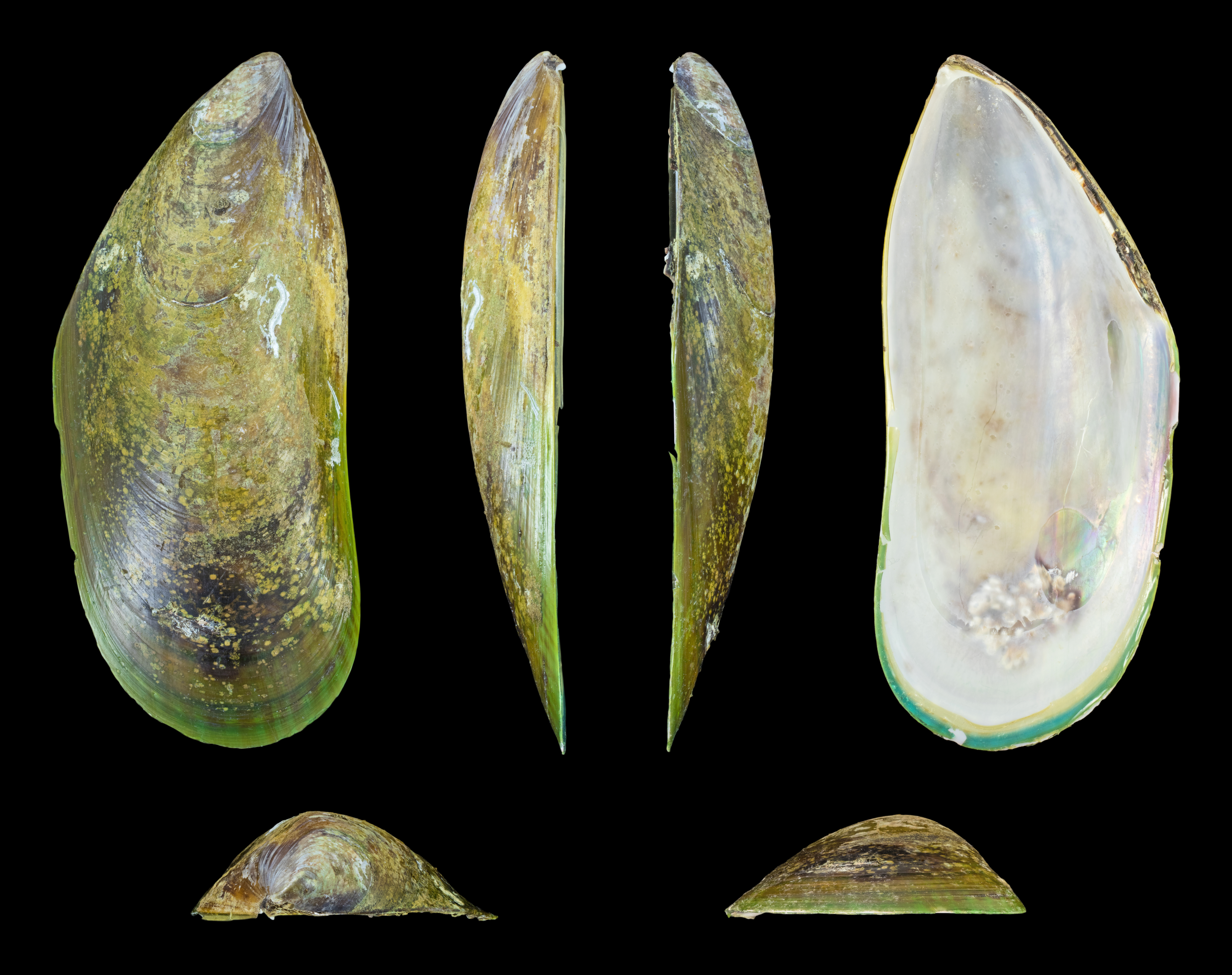
Right valve

== Habitat and distribution ==
The Asian green mussel is found in the coastal waters of the Indo-Pacific region. However the mussels are introduced to other areas as an invasive species via boat hulls and water ballasts.

The mussel inhabits estuarine habitats and is found in densities as high as 35,000 individuals per square meter on any submerged marine object. Although vivid green in appearance, the mussels are shrouded with overgrowth and are often hard to find. The mussels live in waters that are 11–32 °C (52–90 °F) with a wide-ranging salinity of about 18-33 ppt. P. viridis grows fastest at 2 metres (2 yards) below the surface, in high salinity and a high concentration of phytoplankton, although it can tolerate a range of salinity and turbid water.

== Ecology and life history ==
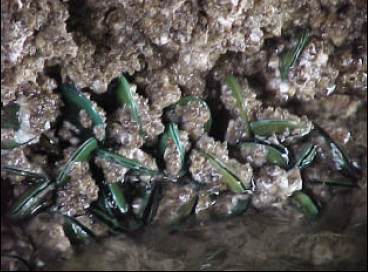
A group of Perna viridis attached on a rocky substrate

The Asian green mussel has separate sexes and fertilizes externally. There are a very few functional hermaphrodites (<0.1%). The mussel's sexual development was shown to be affected by temperature. Spawning ordinarily occurs twice a year between early spring and late autumn; however, the mussels found in the Philippines and Thailand are known to spawn all year round.

The zygote transforms to a larva 7–8 hours after fertilization. The larvae stay in the water column for 10–12 days before undergoing metamorphosis into a juvenile and settling onto a surface. The juveniles become sexually mature when they are 15–30 millimetres (1/2–1 1/4 in) in length, a size reached within 2–3 months. Growth is influenced by the availability of food, temperature, water movement, the mussel's age, and caging. Cage culturing can prevent entry of predators and barnacles increases marketability, but slows down the mussel's growth rate. The adult can live to up 2–3 years. Due to its fast growth, it can outcompete other fouling organisms and cause changes in marine ecological relationships.

This mussel is a filter feeder that feeds on phytoplankton, zooplankton and suspended organic materials. They are eaten by fishes, crustaceans, seastars, octopuses, humans, and other mollusks.

== Importance to humans ==
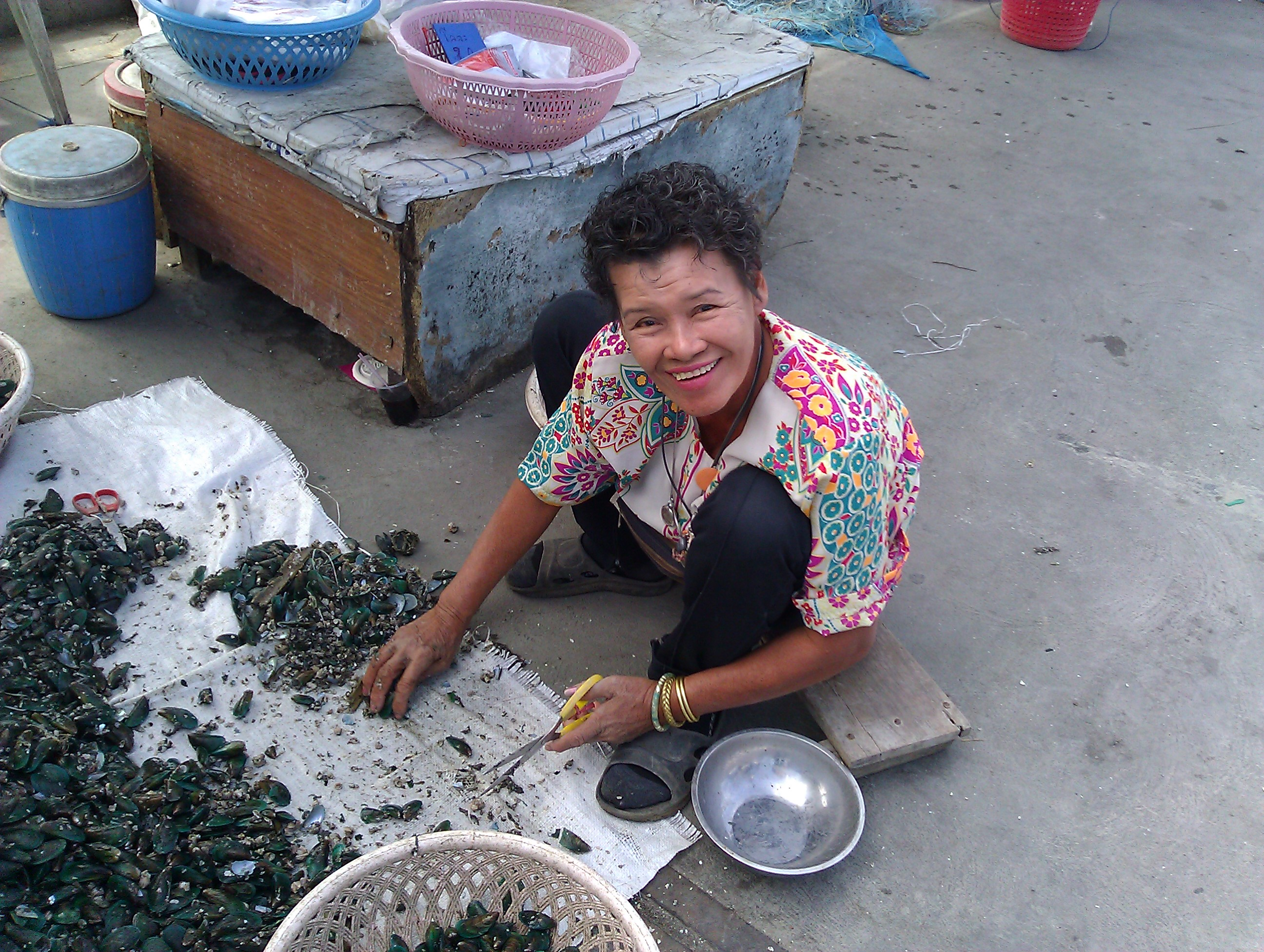
A worker in Chonburi, Thailand, cutting the beards and removing barnacles from Asian green mussels

P. viridis is harvested in the Indo-Pacific region as a food source due to its fast growth. However, it can harbor deadly saxitoxins produced by the dinoflagellates that it feeds upon. It can also be used as a biomonitor to indicate pollution caused by heavy metals, organochlorides and petroleum products. Mussels that are in contaminated areas have labile lysosomal membranes due to metal-induced stress.

This mussel is also notorious for clogging water pipes used by industrial complexes and fouling marine equipment. It has fouled the intake condenser tunnels of power plants in India and Florida, and navigational buoys in China, where their biomass has grown to up to 72 kilograms per square metre (15 lb/sq ft). Chlorination of pipes and using high velocity water was shown to decrease or remove P. viridis population. However, the mussel excretes ammonia which reacts with the chlorine to form monochloramine, a weaker disinfectant than chlorine. Ammonia can also accelerate the corrosion of copper-based alloys found in the water pipes. Heat treatment is also being considered as an alternative to chlorination due to the safety and environmental concerns raised by the latter method.

As an invasive species, the mollusk is viewed as threat to oyster fisheries in several nations where it has been introduced. It might also displace native mussels as well as introduce harmful parasites and diseases. As a fouling species, the mussel also poses a threat by covering anthropogenic surfaces such as the cooling tunnels of power plants and buoys.

The green mussel is edible and used widely in several Asian cuisines. In Thai cuisine, it is popularly baked in a pot with basil and kaffir lime leaves with lemongrass stems, eaten with a spicy and sour dipping sauce, like other seafood dishes.
