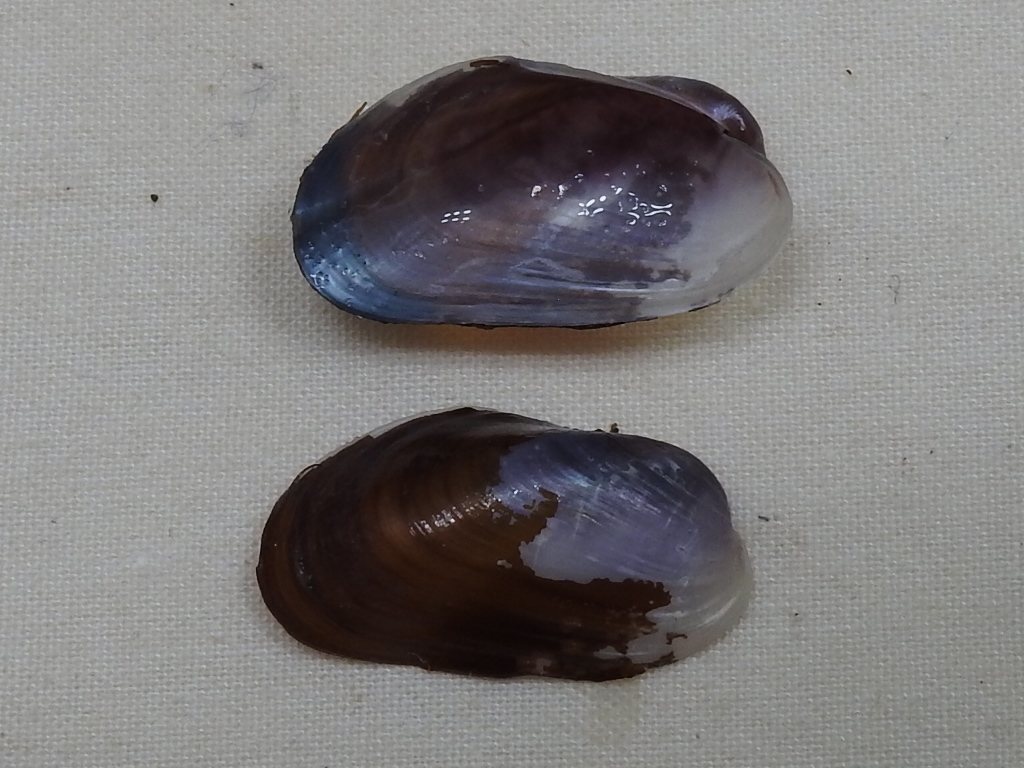

Scientific classification
- Kingdom: Animalia
- Phylum: Mollusca
- Class: Bivalvia
- Order: Mytilida
- Family: Mytilidae
- Genus: Lioberus
- Species: L. castaneus

Binomial name
- Lioberus castaneus (Say, 1822)

Synonyms
- Lioberus castaneus (Say, 1822); Modiola castanea Say, 1822; Volsella splendida Dunker, 1857

= Lioberus castanea =

Species of bivalve

Lioberus castanea is a species of bivalve mollusc in the family Mytilidae. It can be found along the Atlantic coast of North America, ranging from Florida to the West Indies and Brazil.
