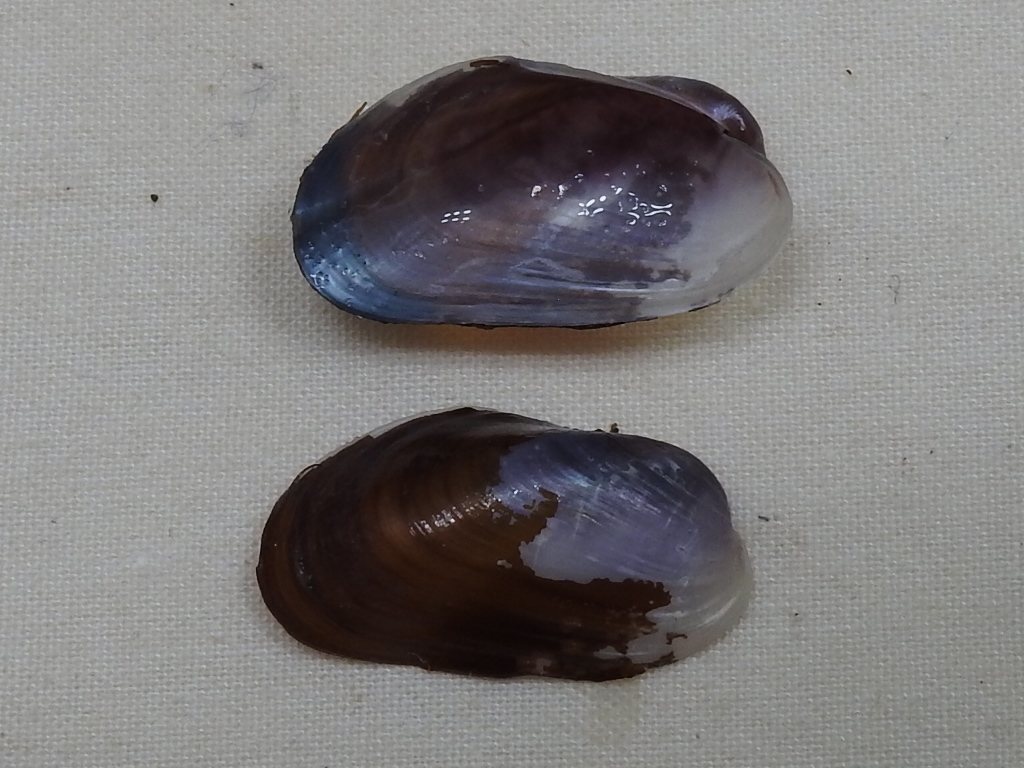
- Lioberus castanea

Scientific classification
- Domain: Eukaryota
- Kingdom: Animalia
- Phylum: Mollusca
- Class: Bivalvia
- Order: Mytilida
- Family: Mytilidae
- Genus: Lioberus; Dall, 1898

Synonyms
- Fulgida Jousseaume, 1919; Modiola (Fulgida) Jousseaume, 1919

= Lioberus =

Genus of bivalves

Lioberus is a genus of mussels in the family Mytilidae.

== Species ==
The following species are recognised in the genus Lioberus:

- Lioberus agglutinans (Cantraine, 1835)
- Lioberus castanea (Say, 1822) — Say's chestnut mussel
- Lioberus ligneus (Reeve, 1858)
- Lioberus salvadoricus (Hertlein & A. M. Strong, 1946)
