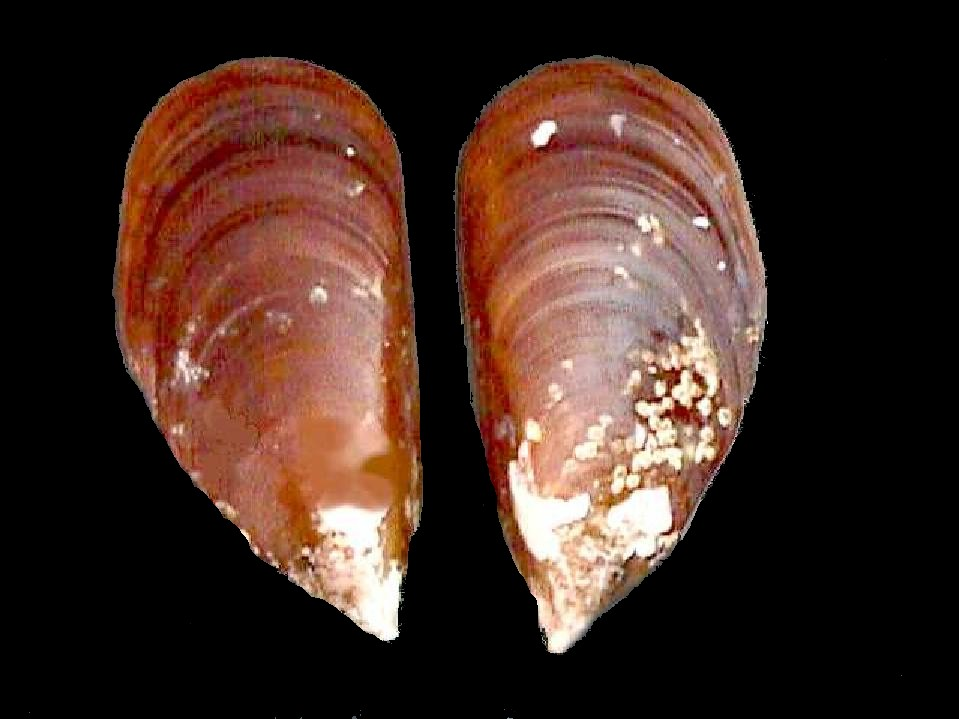

Scientific classification
- Kingdom: Animalia
- Phylum: Mollusca
- Class: Bivalvia
- Order: Mytilida
- Family: Mytilidae
- Genus: Perna
- Species: P. perna

Binomial name
- Perna perna (Linnaeus, 1758)

Synonyms
- Chloromya perna; Melina perna (Linnaeus, 1758); Mya perna Linnaeus, 1758; Mytilus achatinus Lamarck, 1819; Mytilus afer Gmelin, 1791; Mytilus africanus Chemnitz, 1785; Mytilus elongatus Fischer von Waldheim, 1807; Mytilus elongatus Chemnitz in Schröter, 1788 (unavailable name); Mytilus irisans Jousseaume, 1888; Mytilus magellanicus Röding, 1798; Mytilus perna (Linnaeus, 1758); Mytilus pictusBorn, 1778; Mytilus variegatus Röding, 1798; Mytilus venezolanusAndreu, 1965; Mytilus versicolor Gmelin, 1791; Perna africana (Chemnitz, 1785) (not available); Perna africana var. mauretanica Pallary, 1900; Perna africana var. tingitana Pallary, 1900; Perna indica Kuriakose & Nair, 1976; Perna magellanica Philipsson, 1788; Perna perna f. picta (Born, 1778); Perna picta (Born, 1778)

= Perna perna =

Brown mussel

Species of bivalve

Perna perna, the brown mussel, is an economically important mussel, a bivalve mollusc belonging to the family Mytilidae. It is harvested as a food source but is also known to harbor toxins and cause damage to marine structures. It is native to the waters of Africa, Europe, and South America and was introduced in the waters of North America.

== Description ==
Perna perna is usually 90 mm long although it can reach sizes of up to 120 mm. The mussel is easily recognized by its brown color but its identifying characteristic is the "divided posterior retractor mussel scar". Its pitted resillal ridge also differentiates the mussel from other bivalves.

Similar species include the European mussel, Mytilus galloprovincialis, and the black mussel, Choromytilus meridionalis. The European mussel is similar in shape and color to the brown mussel and shares its native habitat on the south-western coast of Africa. The European mussel is also more resistant to human disturbance such as use for baits and consumption. It is out-competing the brown mussel as it is more resistant to certain parasites. The black mussel has similar shape and size although it lacks the distinguishable pitted resillal ridge.

The brown mussel can also be mistaken for the more famous greenish-brown species Perna viridis, as their color and shell shape can change depending on environmental conditions.

Right and left valve of the same specimen:

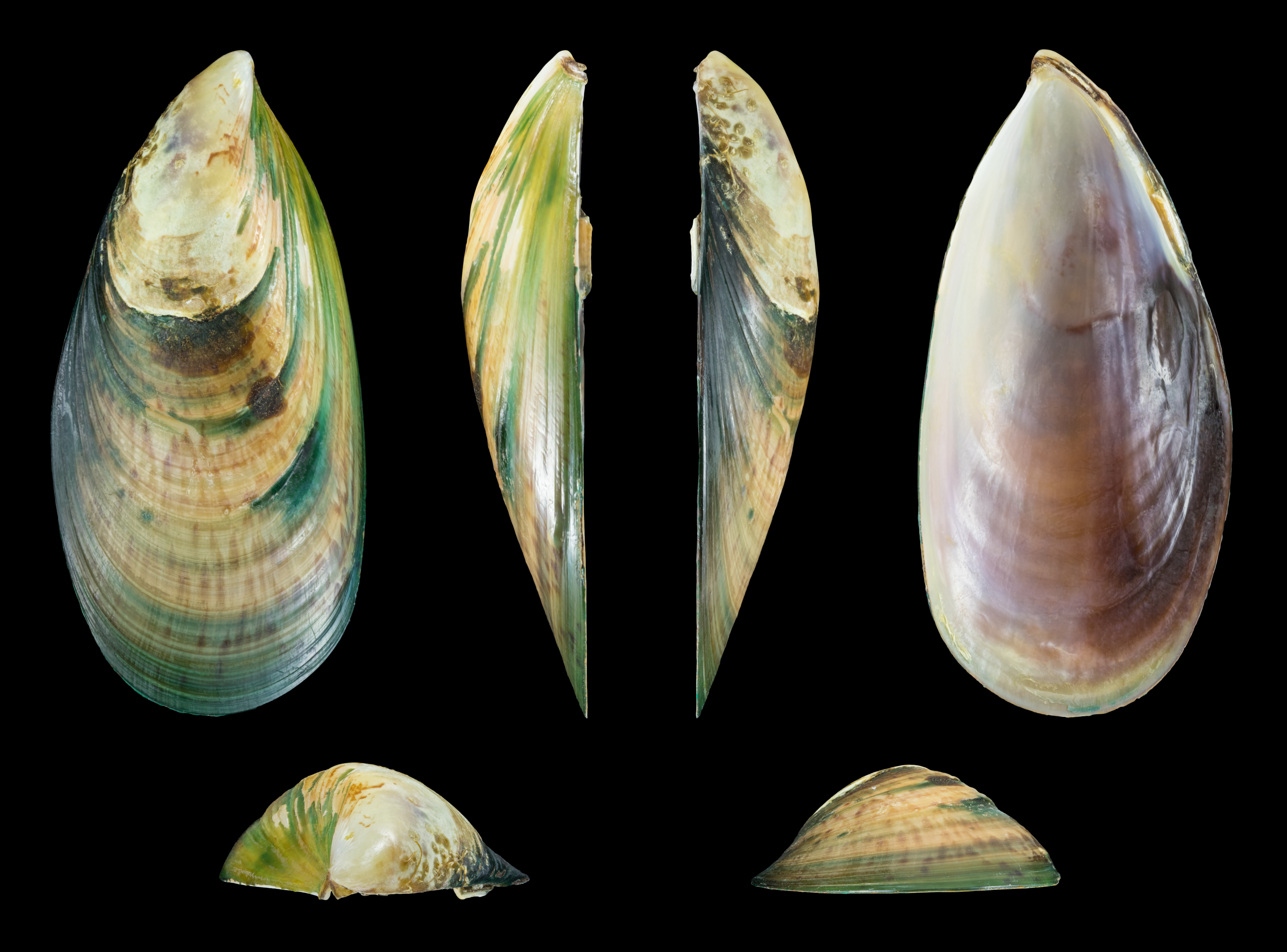
Right valve

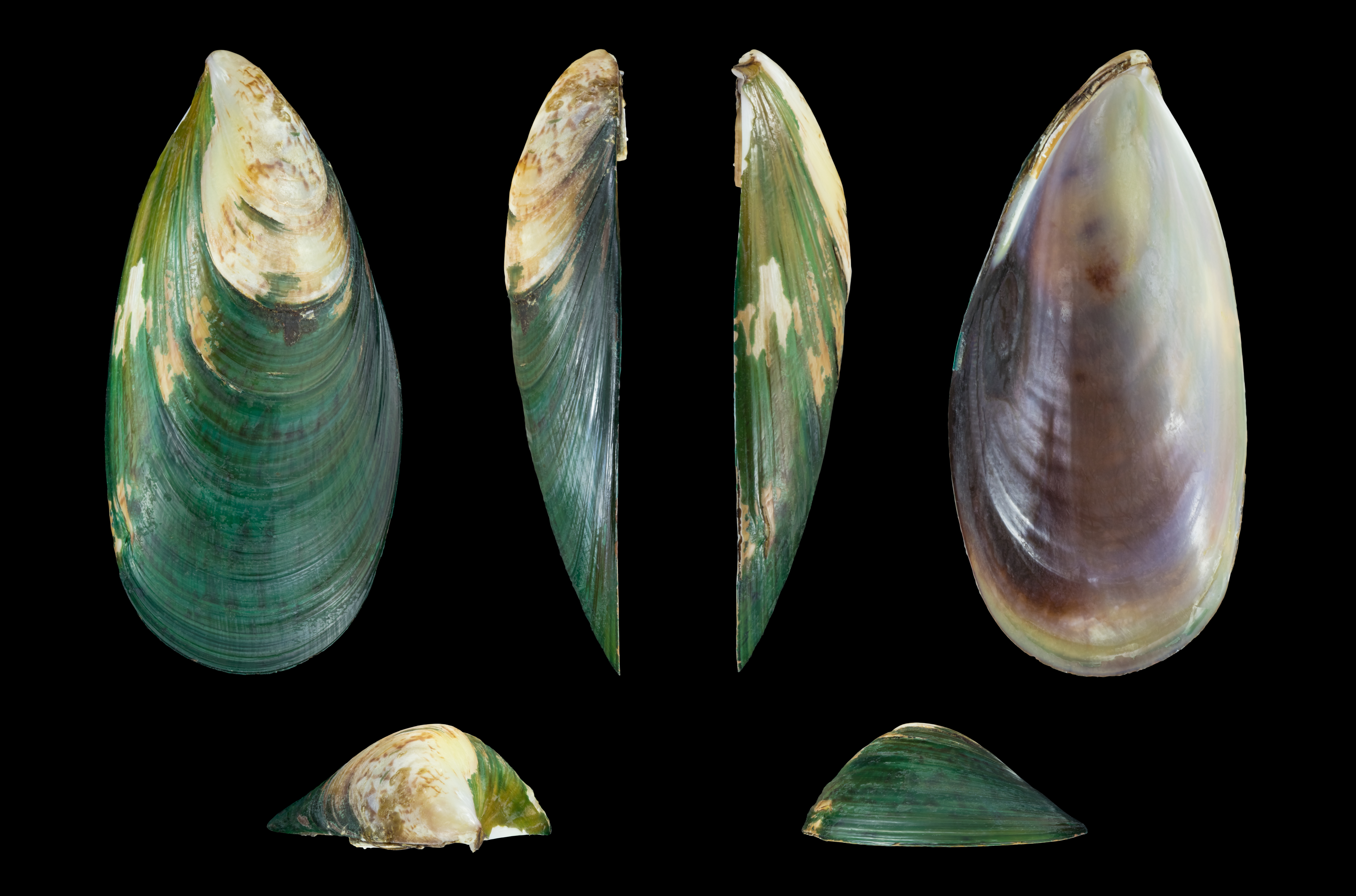
Left valve

Perna perna var. picta
Right and left valve of the same specimen:

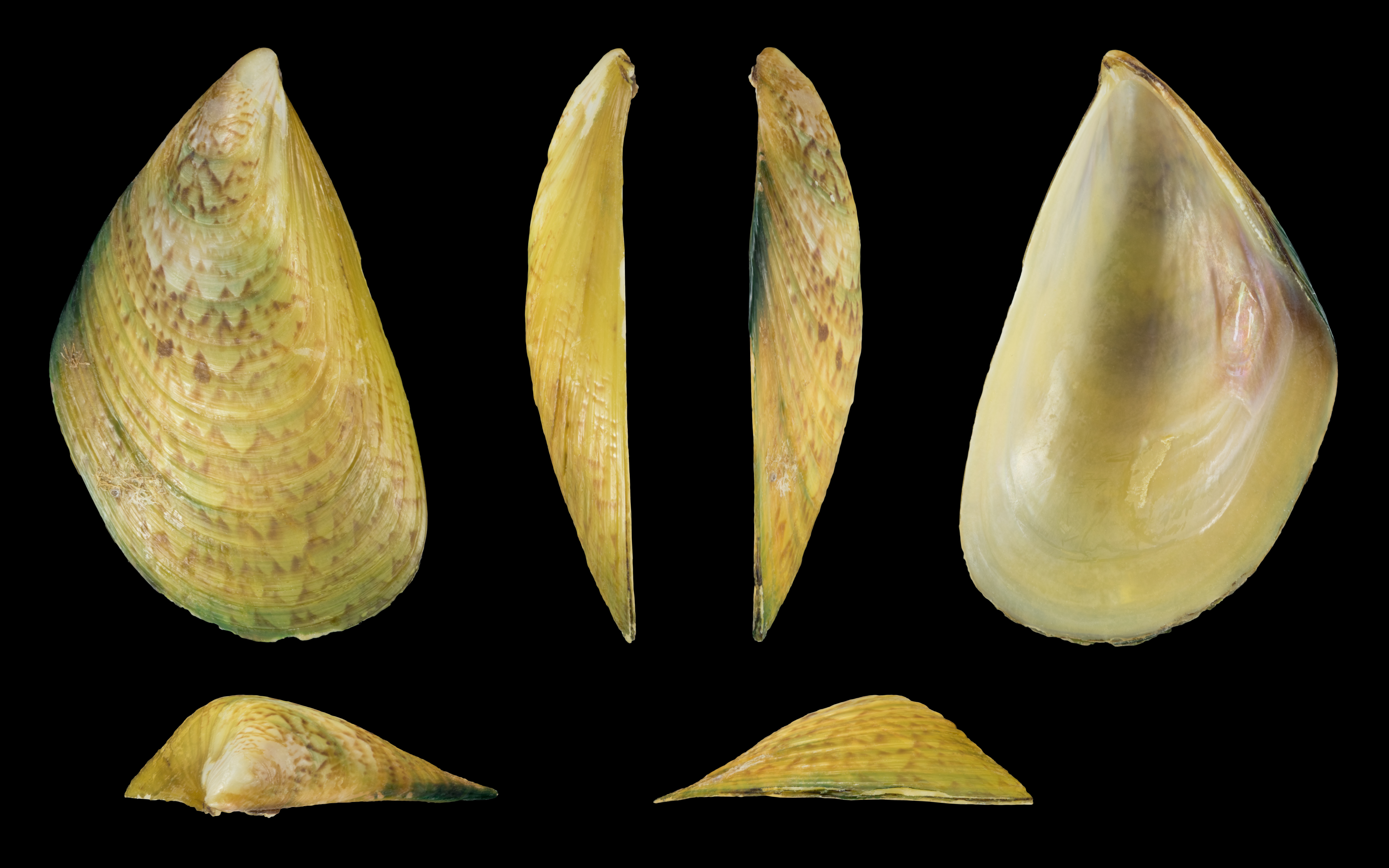
Right valve

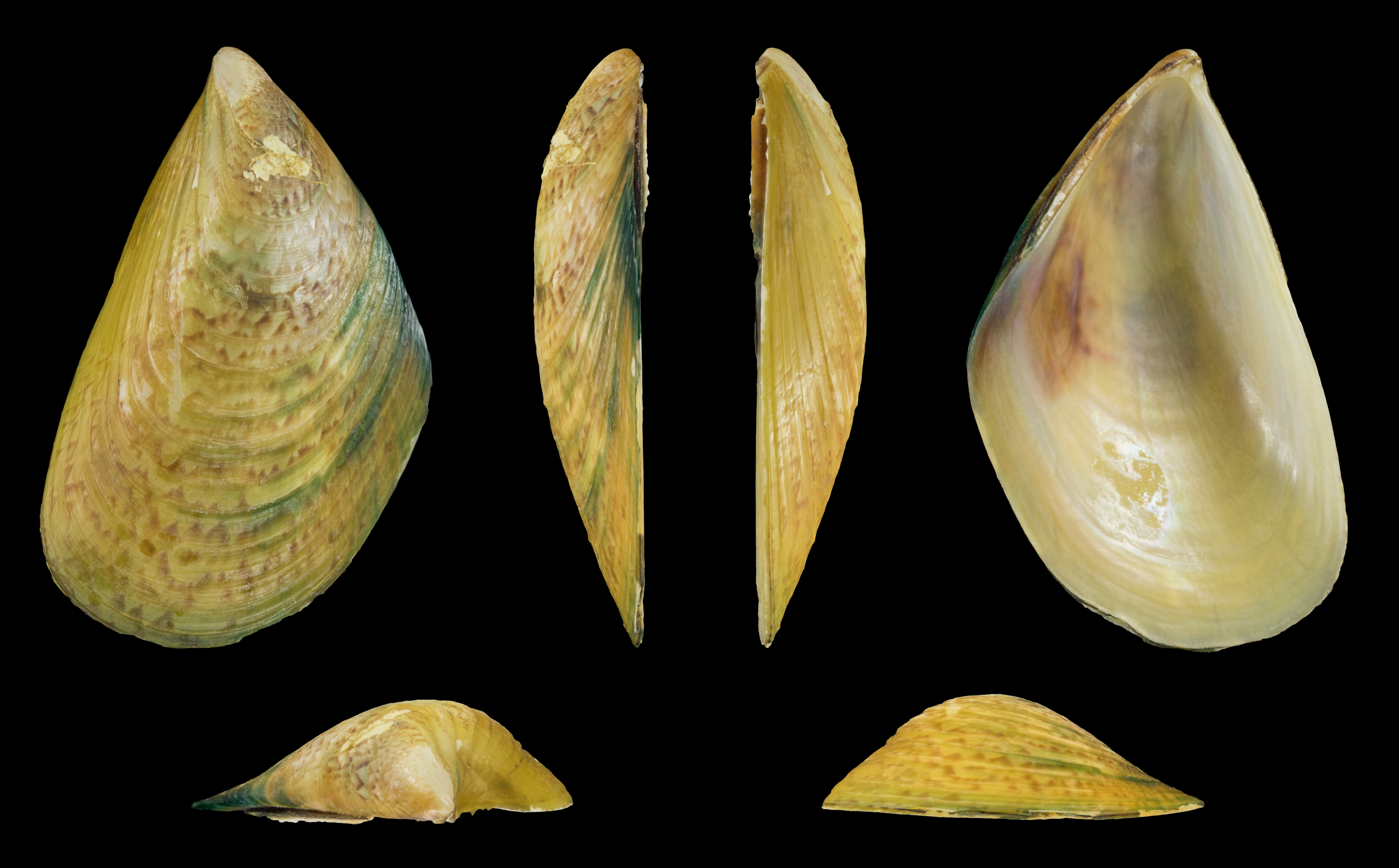
Left valve

Perna perna var. elongata
Right and left valve of the same specimen:

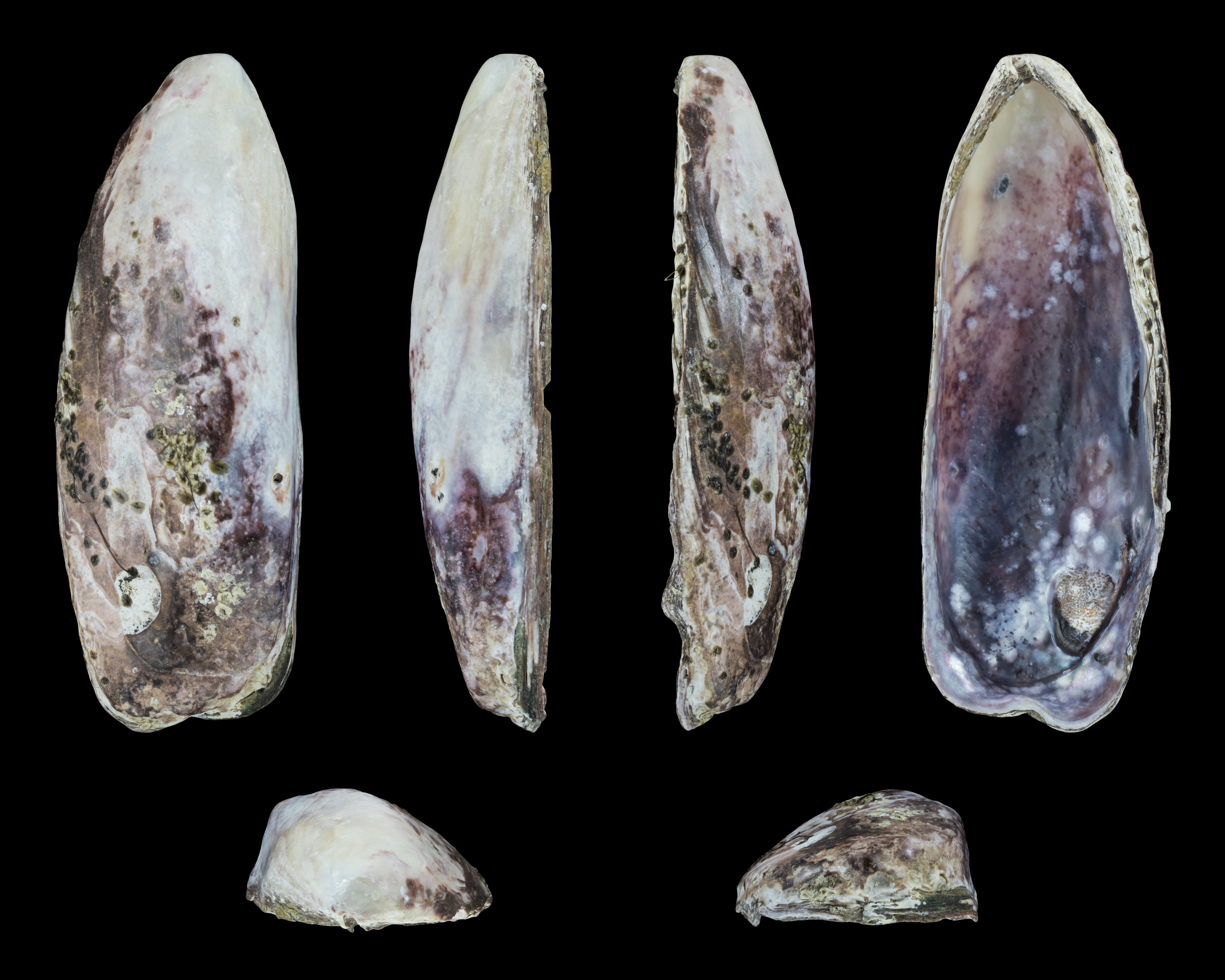
Right valve

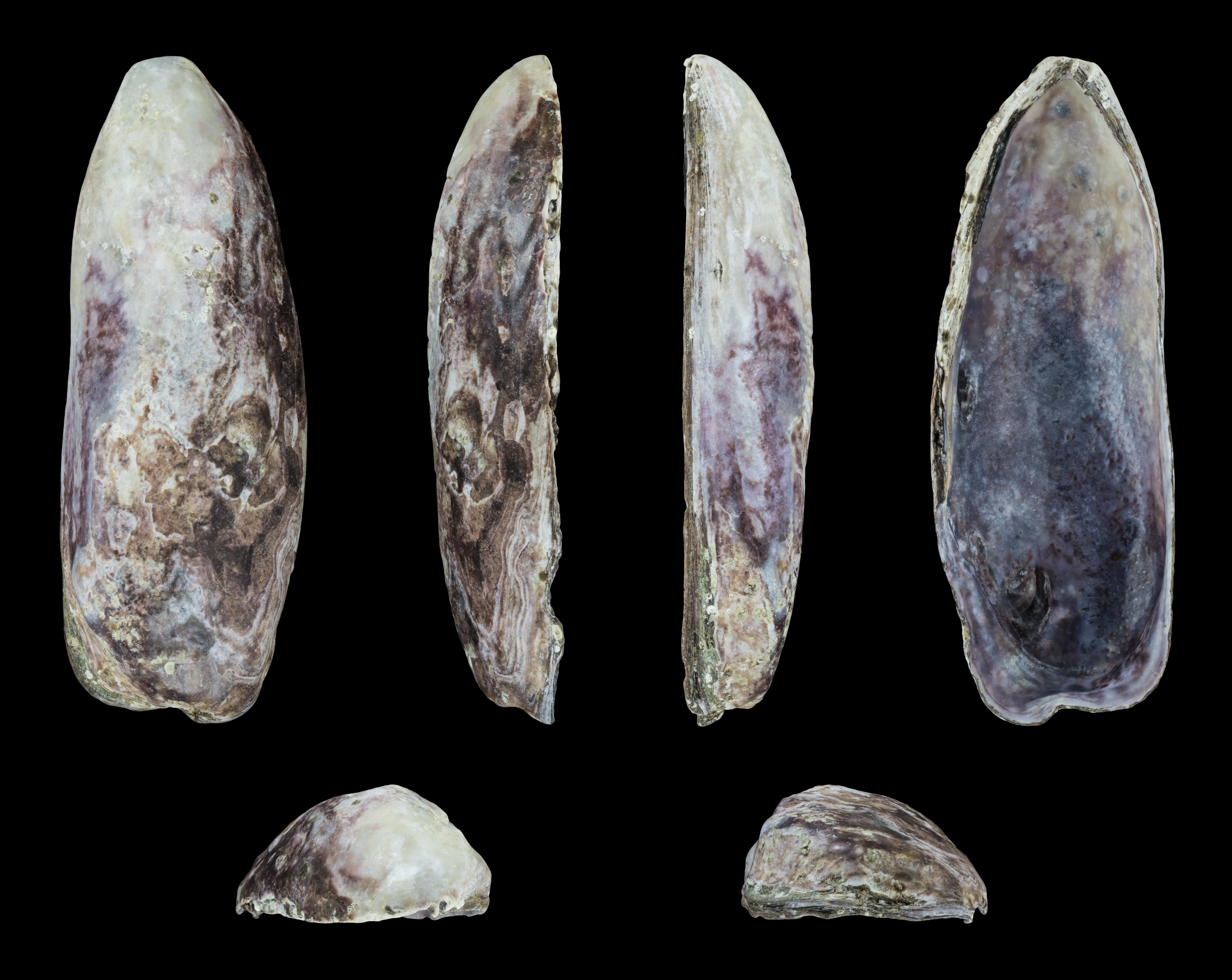
Left valve

== Habitat and distribution ==
The brown mussel is native to the tropical and sub-tropical regions of the Atlantic Ocean and Western Indian Ocean . It is found in waters off the west coast of Africa and the coast of South America up to the Caribbean, as well in the East Coast of Africa and Madagascar. It is accidentally introduced as an invasive species to the coast of Texas via the boat hulls and water ballasts of ships from Venezuela. Its distribution include: Chile, Peru, South Africa.

The brown mussel naturally colonizes rocky shores but can also attach to submerged man-made objects such as navigation buoys, petroleum platforms and shipwrecks. The adult brown mussel can tolerate a temperature range of 10 to 30 °C and a salinity range of about 15 to 50 ppt. Its colonization of the hard strata improves that surface's marine ecology. The colonization increases surface area, encouraging other marine organisms such as limpets, polychaetes, barnacles, snails and algae to settle there as well.

== Ecology and life history ==
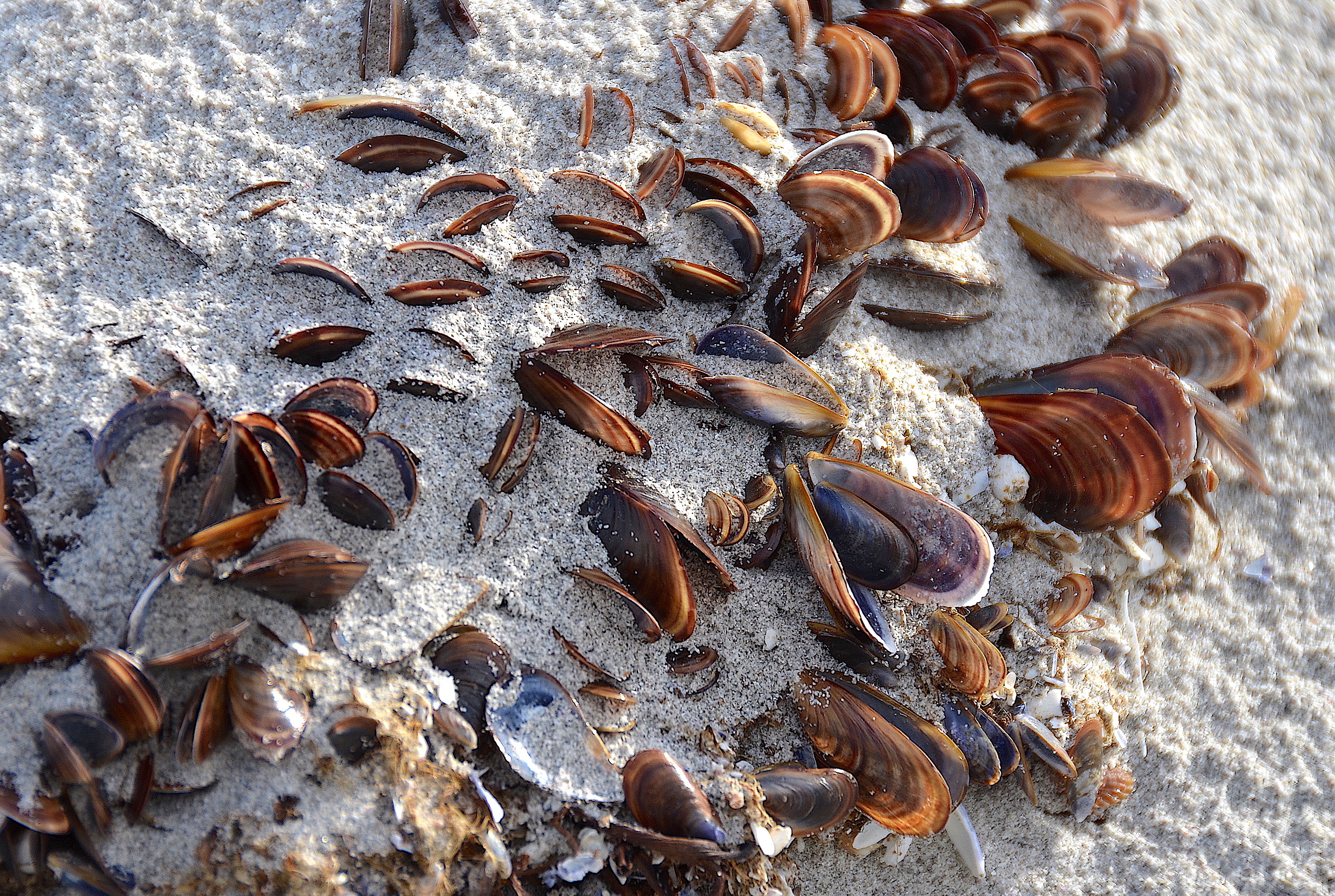
Colony of Brown Mussels silted up in South Africa

The mussel utilizes external fertilization during the spawning season between May and October although this is also reported to occur in December. The two sexes release eggs and sperm to the water during spawning to produce veliger larvae. Fifteen hours after fertilization the larvae have well-developed hinge teeth. Ten to twelve days after fertilization the larvae undergo metamorphosis where byssal threads are secreted. The larvae then settle on rocky surfaces.

The brown mussel is a filter feeder and feeds on phytoplankton, zooplankton and suspended organic materials. It is plagued by the parasite Proctoeces maculatus and an unidentified bucephalid sporocyst which castrates both sexes. On the African coastline it is preyed upon by the whelk Nucella cingulata, lobsters, octopuses, gulls and the African black oystercatcher. On the South American coastline, it provides food for Callinectes danae, Cymatium parthenopeum, Chicoreus brevifrons, Thais haemastoma, and Menippe nodifrons.

== Importance to humans ==
Perna perna is harvested as a food source in Africa and South America. The bivalve is considered for cultivation as it can grow quickly to the commercial size of 60 to 80 mm in just 6 or 7 months. It is also well-suited to tropical and subtropical regions. However, the mussel can harbor saxitoxin from consumed dinoflagellates. Its consumption has caused outbreaks of paralytic shellfish poisoning in Venezuela.

The brown mussel is known to aggregate in such large amounts that it is able to sink navigational buoys. It also coexists with the Asian green mussel in fouling water pipes and marine equipment. It is less resistant to chlorination than Perna viridis and thus easier to control. However, it is recommended that the concentration of chlorine used for chlorination be above the tolerance level of Perna viridis, the tougher of the two biofouling mussels.
