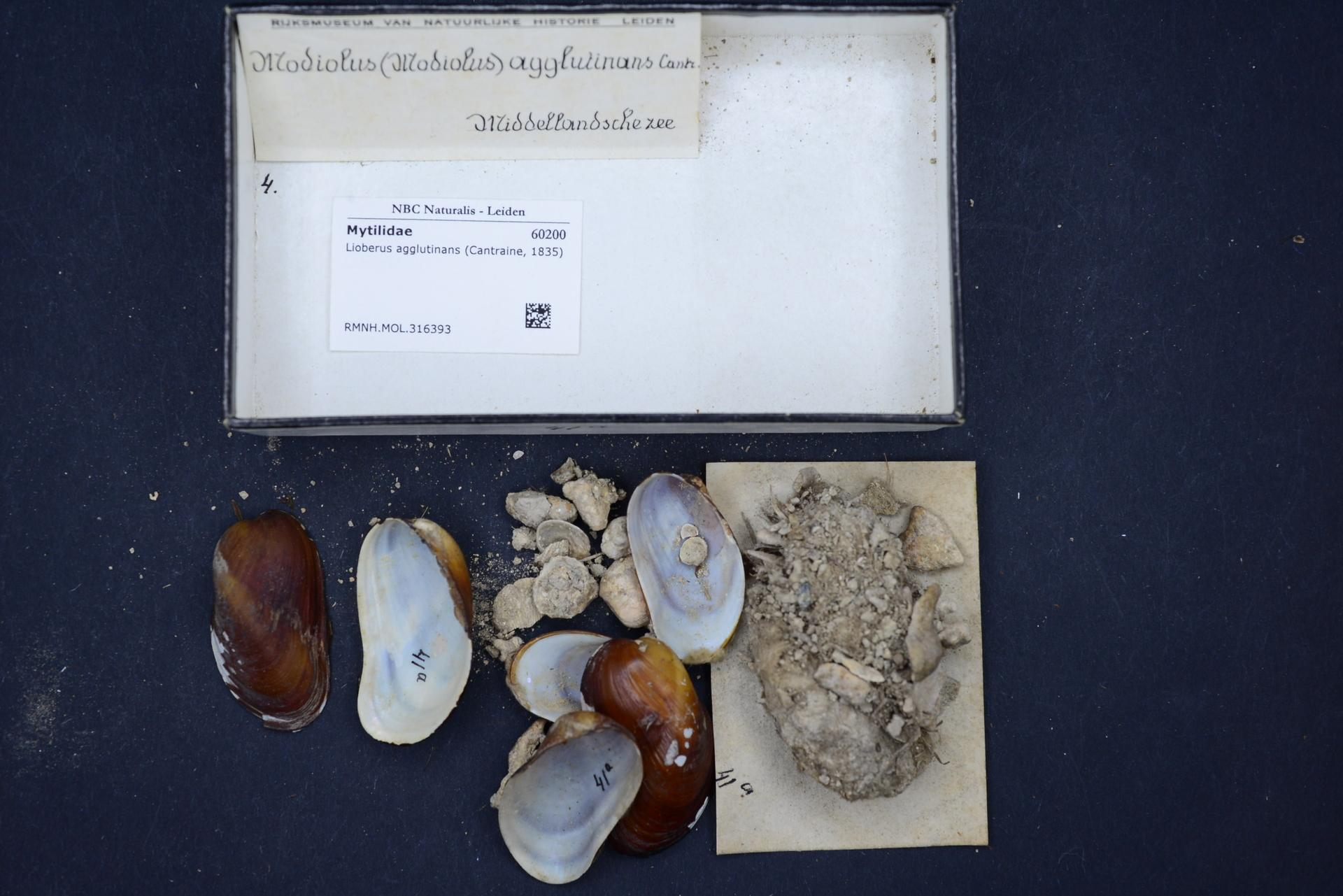

Scientific classification
- Kingdom: Animalia
- Phylum: Mollusca
- Class: Bivalvia
- Order: Mytilida
- Family: Mytilidae
- Genus: Lioberus
- Species: L. agglutinans

Binomial name
- Lioberus agglutinans Cantraine, 1835

Synonyms
- Modiolus agglutinans (Cantraine, 1835); Amygdalum agglutinans Cantraine, 1835; Modiola abscondita Aradas, 1847; Modiola agglutinans Cantraine, 1835; Modiola balli T. Brown, 1844; Modiola ballii T. Brown, 1844; Modiola vestita R. A. Philippi, 1844; Modiola zizyphina Caruana, 1867; Modiolus agglutinans Cantraine, 1835

= Lioberus agglutinans =

Species of bivalve

Lioberus agglutinans is a species of bivalve in the family Mytilidae. The scientific name of the species was first validly published in 1835 by François-Joseph Cantraine.
