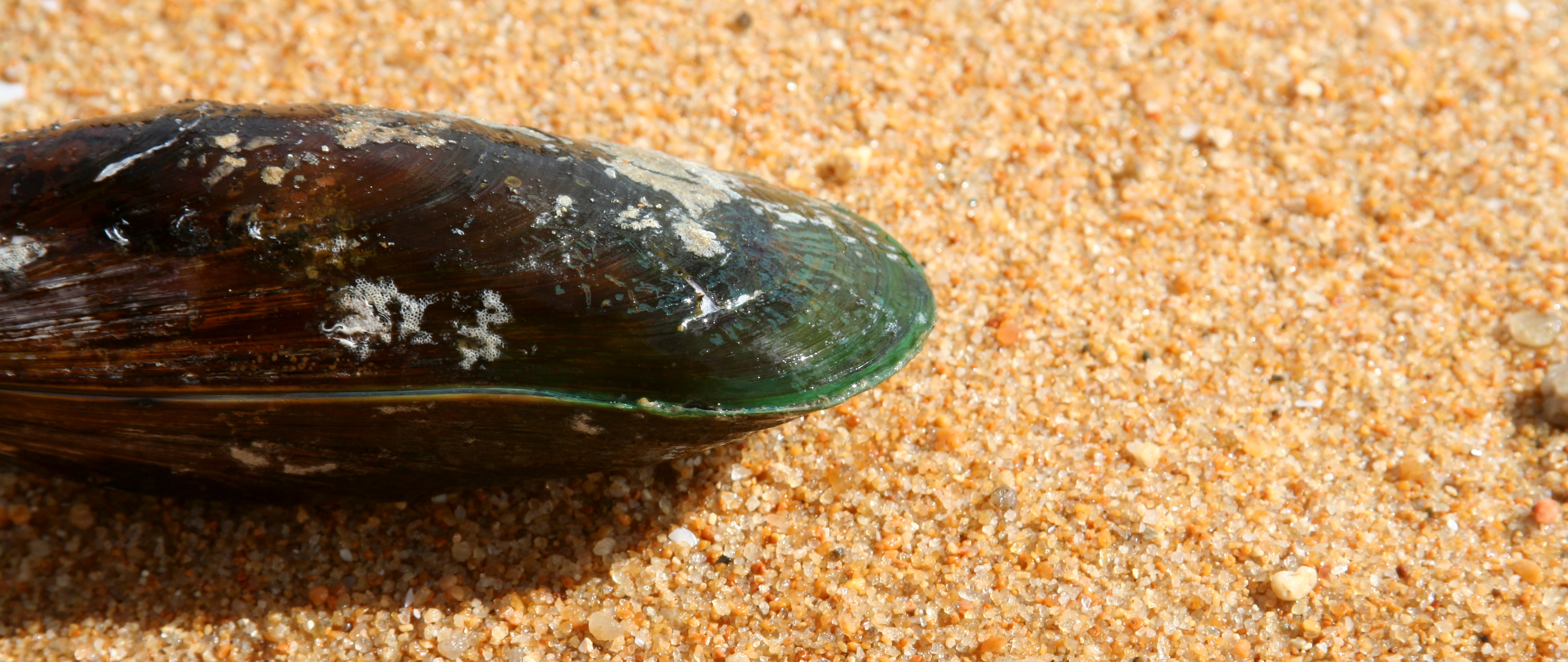
- Perna canaliculus, the New Zealand mussel

Scientific classification
- Kingdom: Animalia
- Phylum: Mollusca
- Class: Bivalvia
- Order: Mytilida
- Family: Mytilidae
- Subfamily: Crenellinae
- Genus: Perna

Species
- See text

Synonyms
- Chloromya Mörch, 1853

= Perna (bivalve) =

Genus of bivalves

Perna is a genus of mussels, marine bivalve molluscs in the family Mytilidae.

Not to be confused with Perna Bruguière, 1789 , synonym of Isognomon Lightfoot, 1786

== Species ==
Species within the genus Perna include:

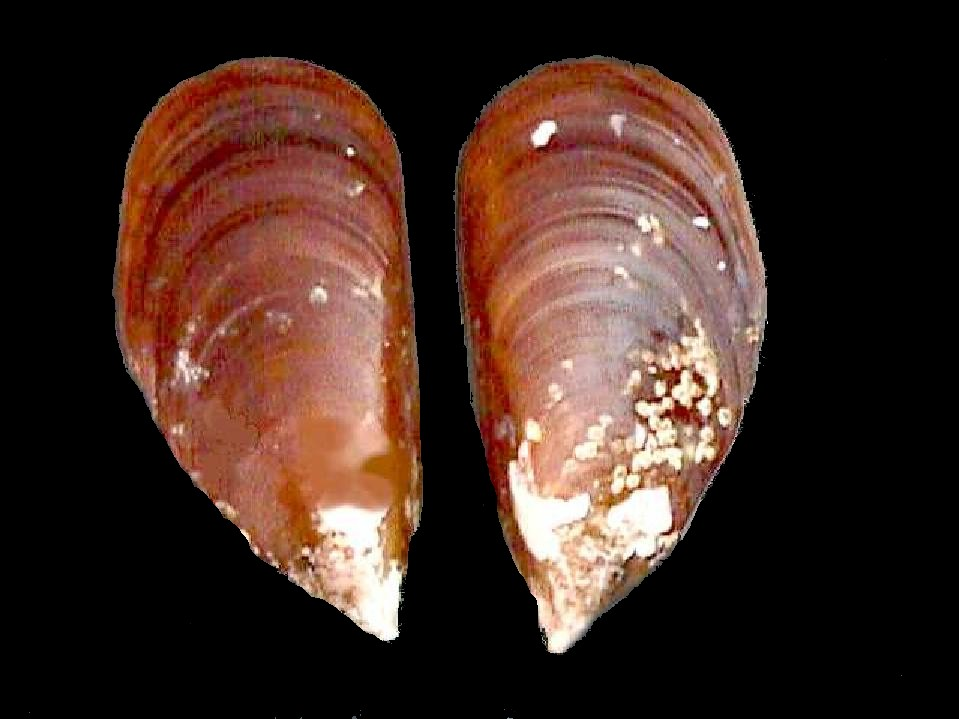
Perna perna

- Perna canaliculus (Gmelin, 1791) New Zealand green-lipped mussel
- Perna perna (Linnaeus, 1758)
- † Perna tetleyi (Powell & Bartrum, 1929)
- Perna viridis: Asian green mussel (Linnaeus, 1758)

Species brought into synonymy:

- Perna africana (Chemnitz, 1785): synonym of Perna perna (Linnaeus, 1758)
- Perna confusa Angas, 1871: synonym of Limnoperna securis (Lamarck, 1819)
- Perna fulgida H. Adams, 1870: synonym of Lioberus ligneus (Reeve, 1858)
- Perna indica Kuriakose & Nair, 1976: synonym of Perna perna (Linnaeus, 1758)
- Perna magellanica Philipsson, 1788: synonym of Perna perna (Linnaeus, 1758)
- Perna picta (Born, 1778): synonym of Perna perna (Linnaeus, 1758)
- Perna plumescens Dunker, 1868: synonym of Modiolus plumescens (Dunker, 1868)
- Perna ungulina Philipsson, 1788: synonym of Mytilus edulis Linnaeus, 1758
- Perna variabilis (Krauss, 1848): synonym of Brachidontes pharaonis (P. Fischer, 1870)
