= Dry Carniola =

Coordinates: 45°47′10″N 14°55′30″E

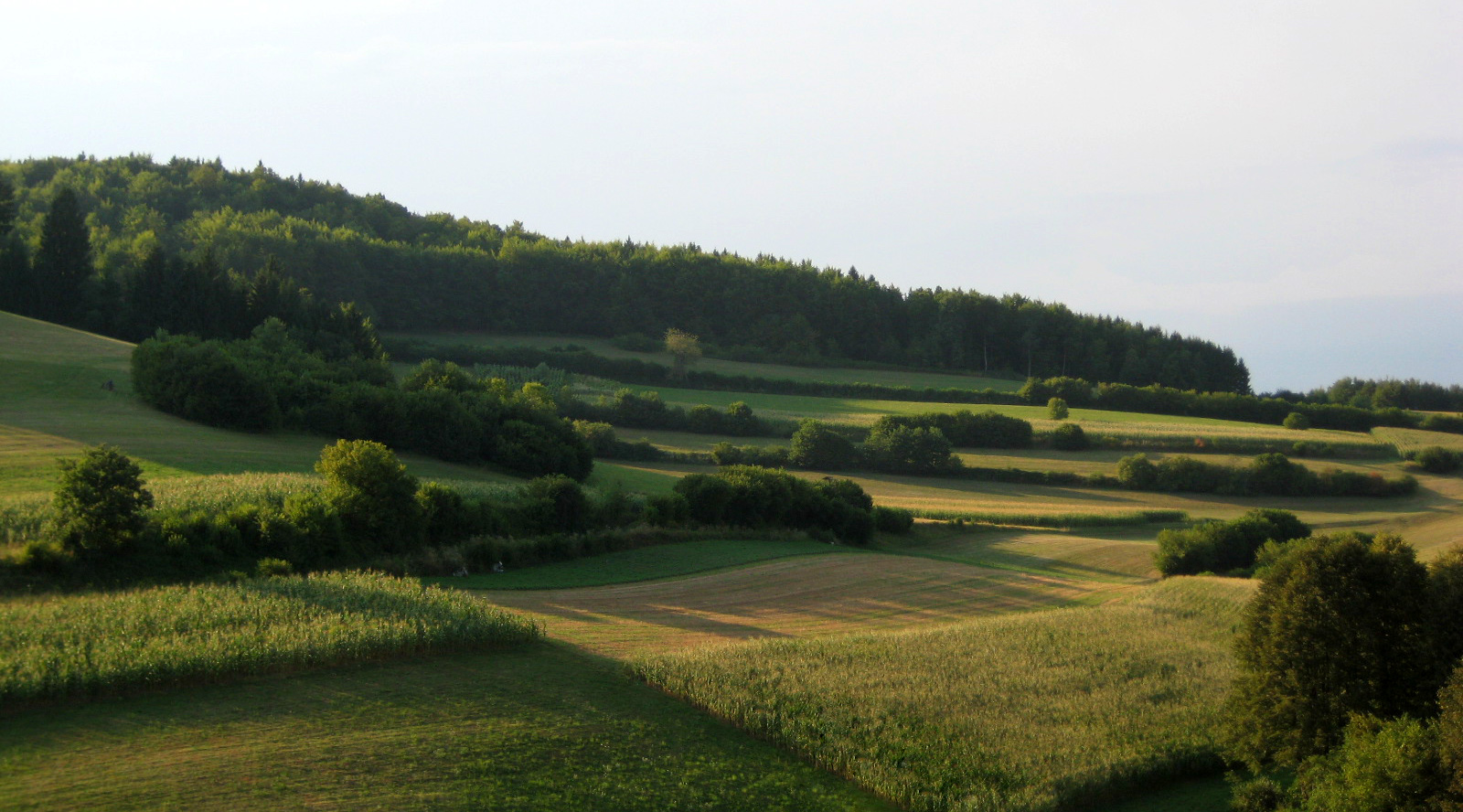
Fields in Dry Carniola (along the road from Žužemberk to Trebnje)

Dry Carniola (Slovene: Suha krajina, German: Dürrenkrain) is a small area in the northwest part of Lower Carniola.

== Geography ==
Dry Carniola is centered around the town of Žužemberk, its largest settlement. The Krka River flows through the area, and Regional Road 216 (R1-216) passes through the area. It has an area of 430 square kilometers (170 sq mi).

== Name ==
The name Suha krajina (literally, 'dry march') refers to dryness of the region. There is a general lack of surface water in the area, which lies on permeable karstified limestone and dolomite, through which most precipitation disappears into the ground and makes its way to the Krka River. The German designation Dürrenkrain (and in turn the English name Dry Carniola) is the result of a hypercorrection based on the adjective ending -krajnski (understood as a dialect metathesis of *-kranjski), as happened for White Carniola.

== History ==
The region is one of the least developed in Slovenia, and its population is sparse and decreasing. Its weak economic position is a result of its unfavorable natural conditions combined with historical circumstances. Mining and foundry work were important in the area until the 19th century, but died out around 1900 due to the area's poor transport accessibility. The construction of the Lower Carniola Railroad along the Temenica River to the east left the Krka Valley economically isolated.

During the Second World War, Dry Carniola was part of the territory annexed by Italy. Much of the population in the area rejected the communist-led Liberation Front movement due to Partisan murders of civilians and the efforts of local priests. In March 1944, German aircraft bombed the villages of Ambrus and Zagradec, and in April the Partisans murdered Franc Kern, the curate in Hinje, and evicted 30 families. In 1945, Partisan forces burned the villages of Hinje and Žvirče.

Today, Dry Carniola is primarily an agricultural area, with most of the population engaged in farming. Nonetheless, only about 15% of the farms are full-time farms, and the majority of other farmers have additional sources of income from non-agricultural activities. Because there are few non-farming jobs in the area, much of the population commutes to larger industrial centers outside the area. The connection to these was facilitated in recent years by the motorway connection between Ljubljana and Novo Mesto.
