= Velika Ilova Gora =

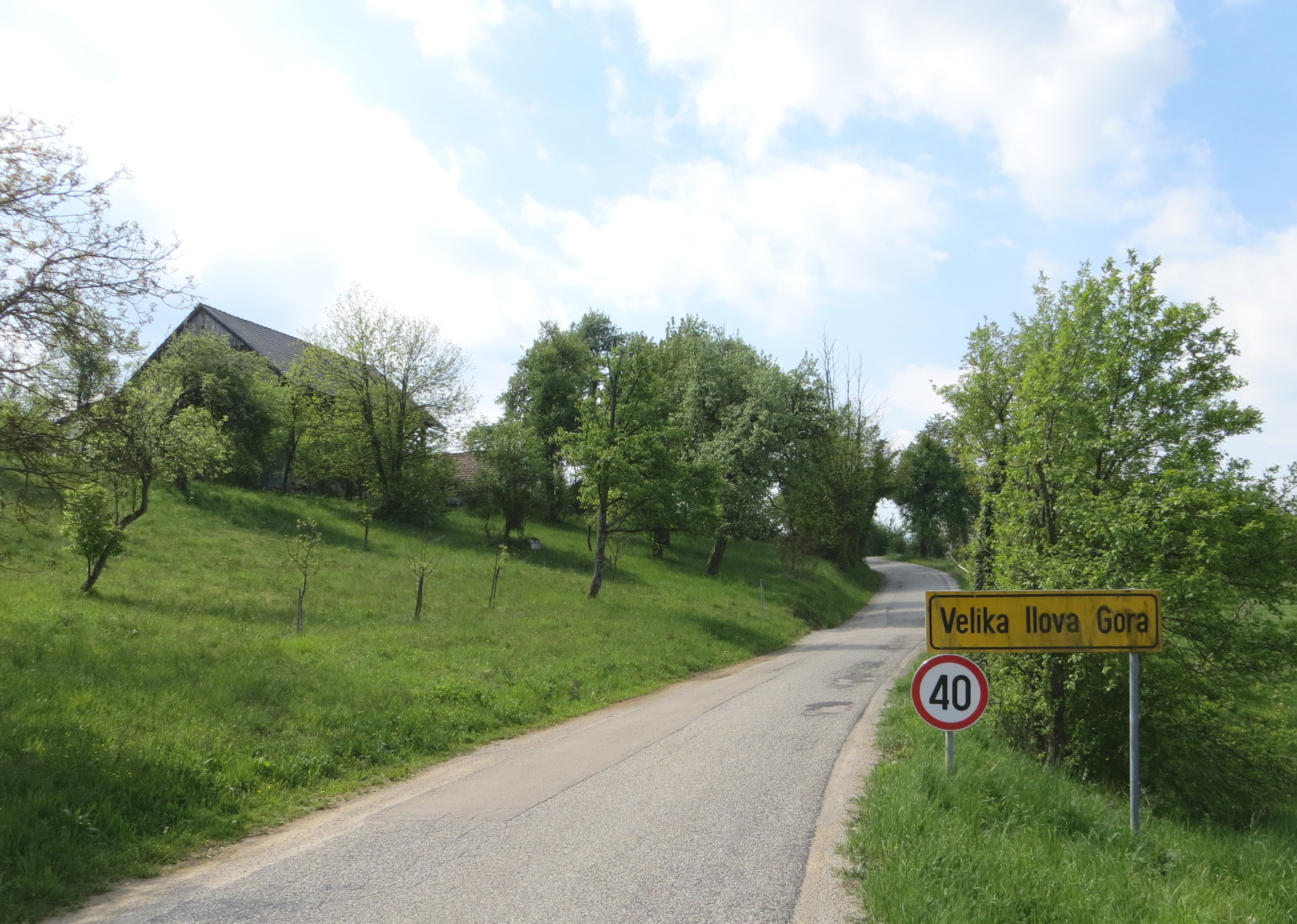

- Location in Slovenia
- Coordinates: 45°53′31.14″N 14°43′57.87″E
- Country: Slovenia
- Traditional region: Lower Carniola
- Statistical region: Central Slovenia
- Municipality: Grosuplje

Area
  - Total: 2.41 km^{2} (0.93 sq mi)
- Elevation: 538.6 m (1,767 ft)

Population (2002)
  - Total: 70

Velika Ilova Gora (pronounced [ˈʋeːlika ˈiːlɔʋa ˈɡɔːɾa]) is a settlement in the Municipality of Grosuplje in central Slovenia. The area is part of the historical region of Lower Carniola. The municipality is now included in the Central Slovenia Statistical Region.

== Church ==
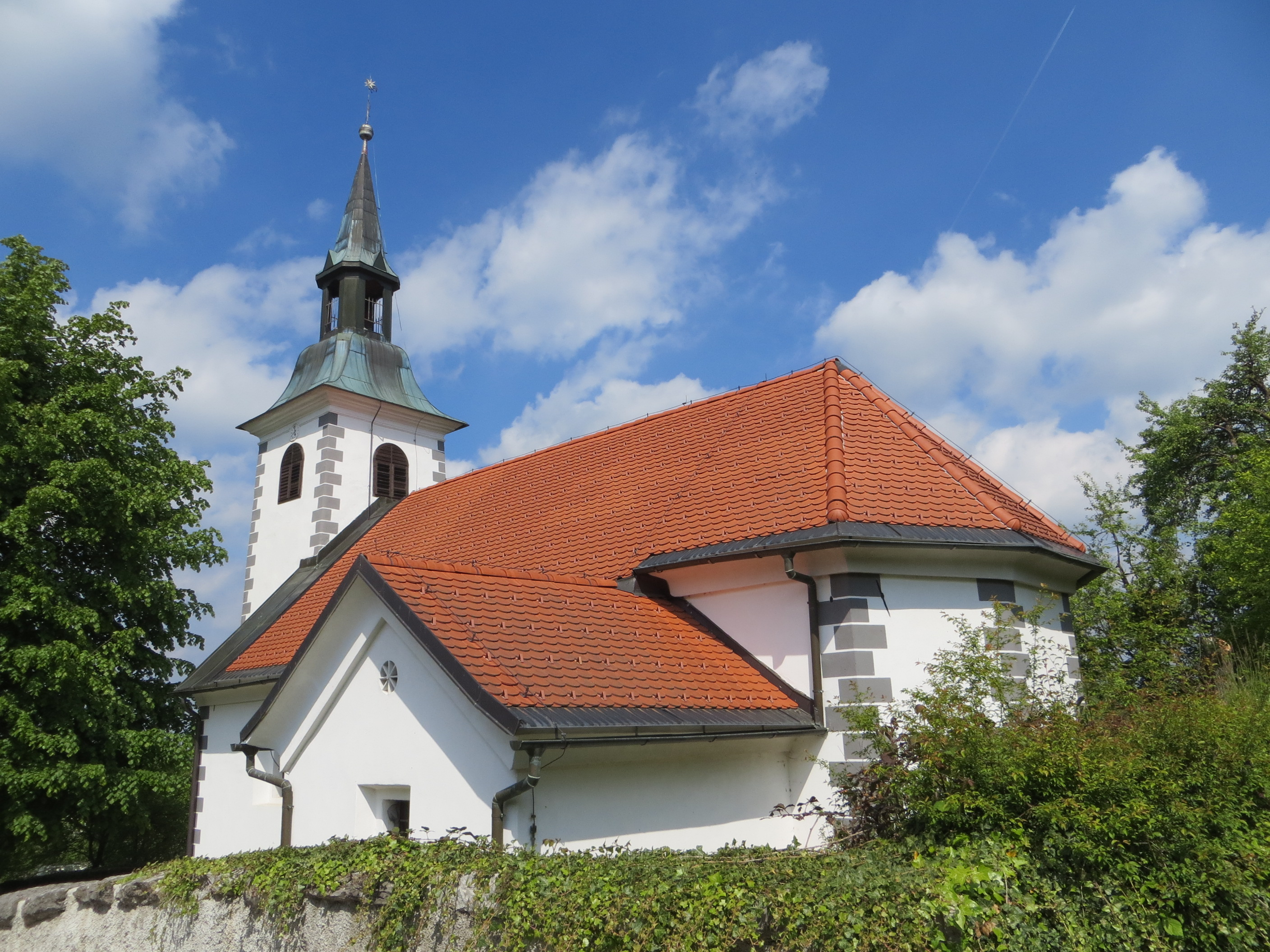
Holy Trinity Church

The local church is dedicated to the Trinity and belongs to the Parish of Kopanj. It was first mentioned in written documents dating to 1433 and has some 17th- and 19th-century additions.
