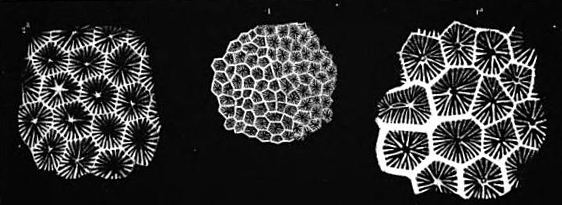

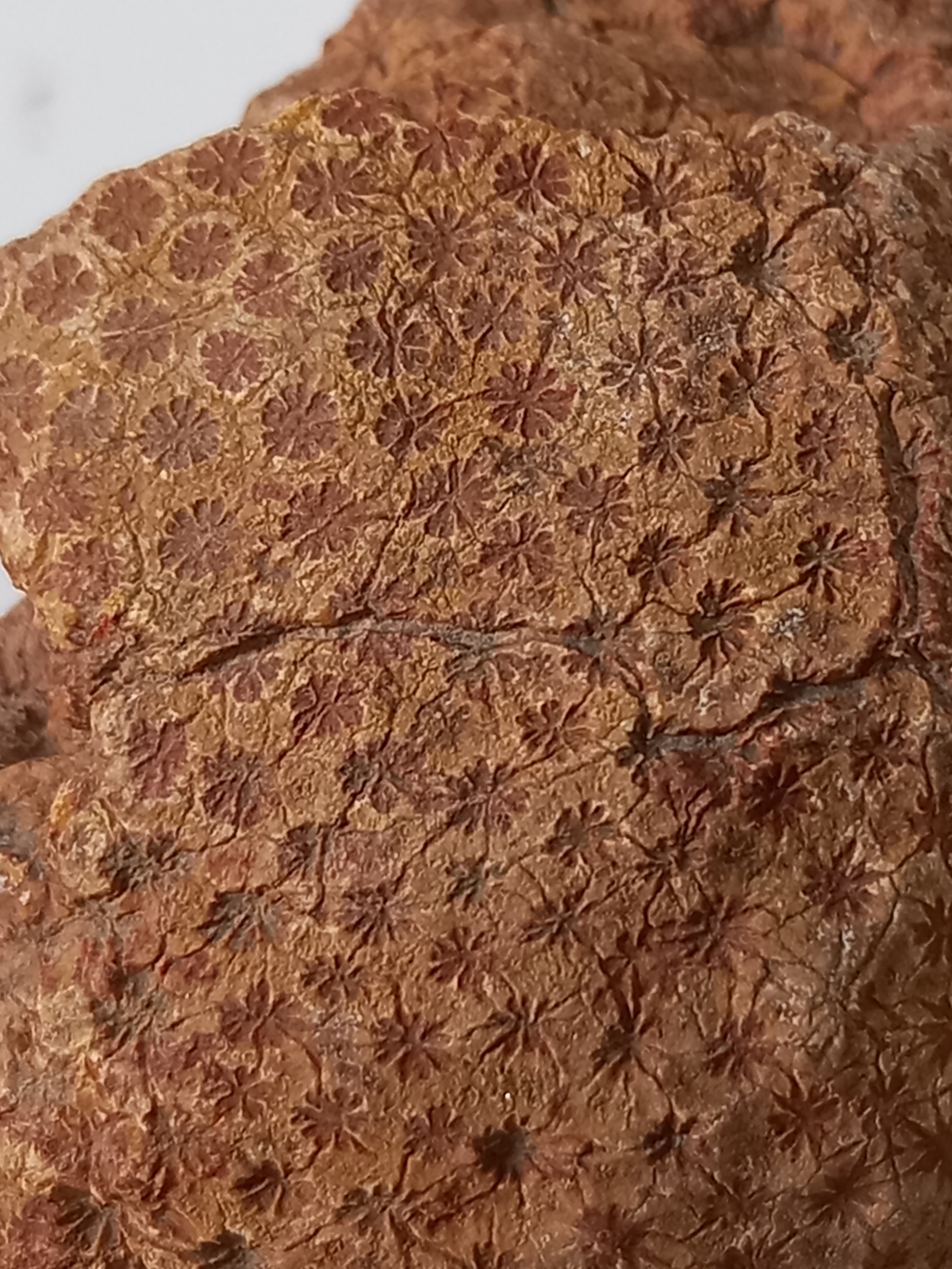
- I. richardsoni showing calyces at various levels of magnification Fossil Isastrea sp from Middle Jurassic, Tabas, Iran

Scientific classification
- Domain: Eukaryota
- Kingdom: Animalia
- Phylum: Cnidaria
- Class: Hexacorallia
- Order: Scleractinia
- Family: †Montlivaltiidae
- Genus: †Isastrea; Milne-Edwards & Haime, 1851

= Isastrea =

Isastrea Temporal range: Jurassic–Cretaceous (Note: Sources variously indicate Jurassic, Middle–Late Cretaceous, and Jurassic–Cretaceous.)

Extinct genus of corals

Isastrea is an extinct genus of corals that lived during the Jurassic and Cretaceous periods. Its fossils have been found in Europe, Africa, North America, Asia and South America.

== Description ==
Isastrea belonged to a group known as the hexacorals, so named for the shape of each individual polyp skeleton (corallite). Each corallite was between 3 millimetres (0.12 in) and 15 millimetres (0.59 in) in diameter. In addition, 30–80 septa (walls dividing body cavities) were present in each animal. Its walls were "weak, discontinuous or absent". In some species, adjacent septa would fuse. Dissepiments ("small blistery plates" serving the purpose of internal support) were plentiful in the animal. Columella (central "rod- or plate-like" structures) were present as well, but were not very strong. The genus is believed to have lived in colonies (each of which could have been 39 inches (0.99 m) long) and formed coral reefs. The colonies were "massive", "encrusting, platey, dome-shaped or sometimes ramose". It was a hermatypic coral, which require "warm, clear, shallow water" and live in symbiotic relationships with algae. It is also likely that zooxanthellae (a kind of protozoa) lived on the coral. It has been theorized that Isastrea could endure lower temperatures than most other hermatypic corals because it occurs farther north than them.

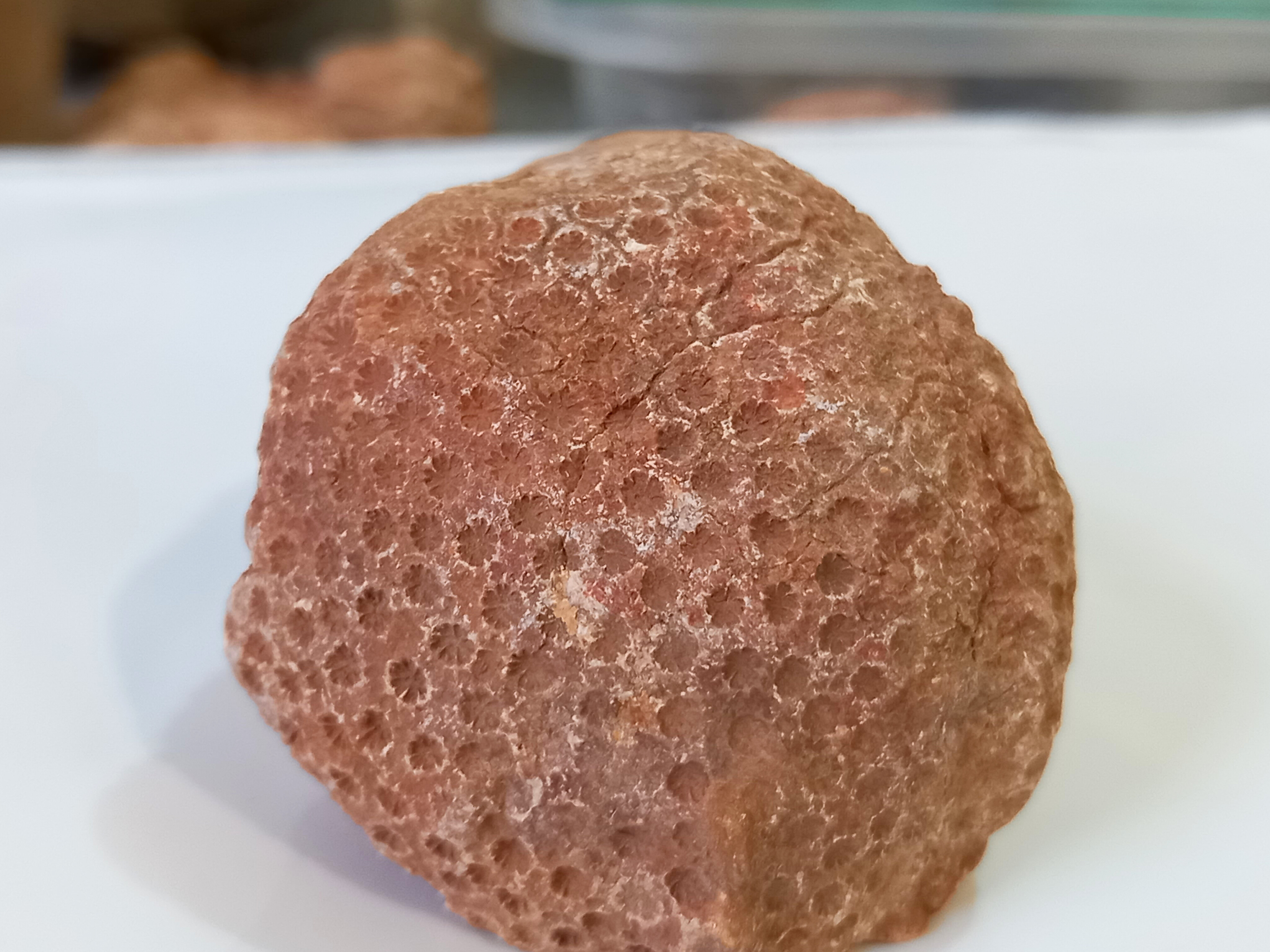
Fossil Isastrea coral from Middle Jurassic, Tabas, Iran

== Species and fossil sites ==
At least 49 species of Isastrea have been described. Milne-Edwards and Haime originally described the following species of Isastrea:

- I. oblonga from the Portland stone
- I. explanata and I. greenoughi from the coral rag
- I. conybearii, I. limitata, I. explanulata, and I. serialis from the Great Oolite
- I. richardsoni, I. tenuistriata, and I. lonsdalii from the Inferior Oolite
