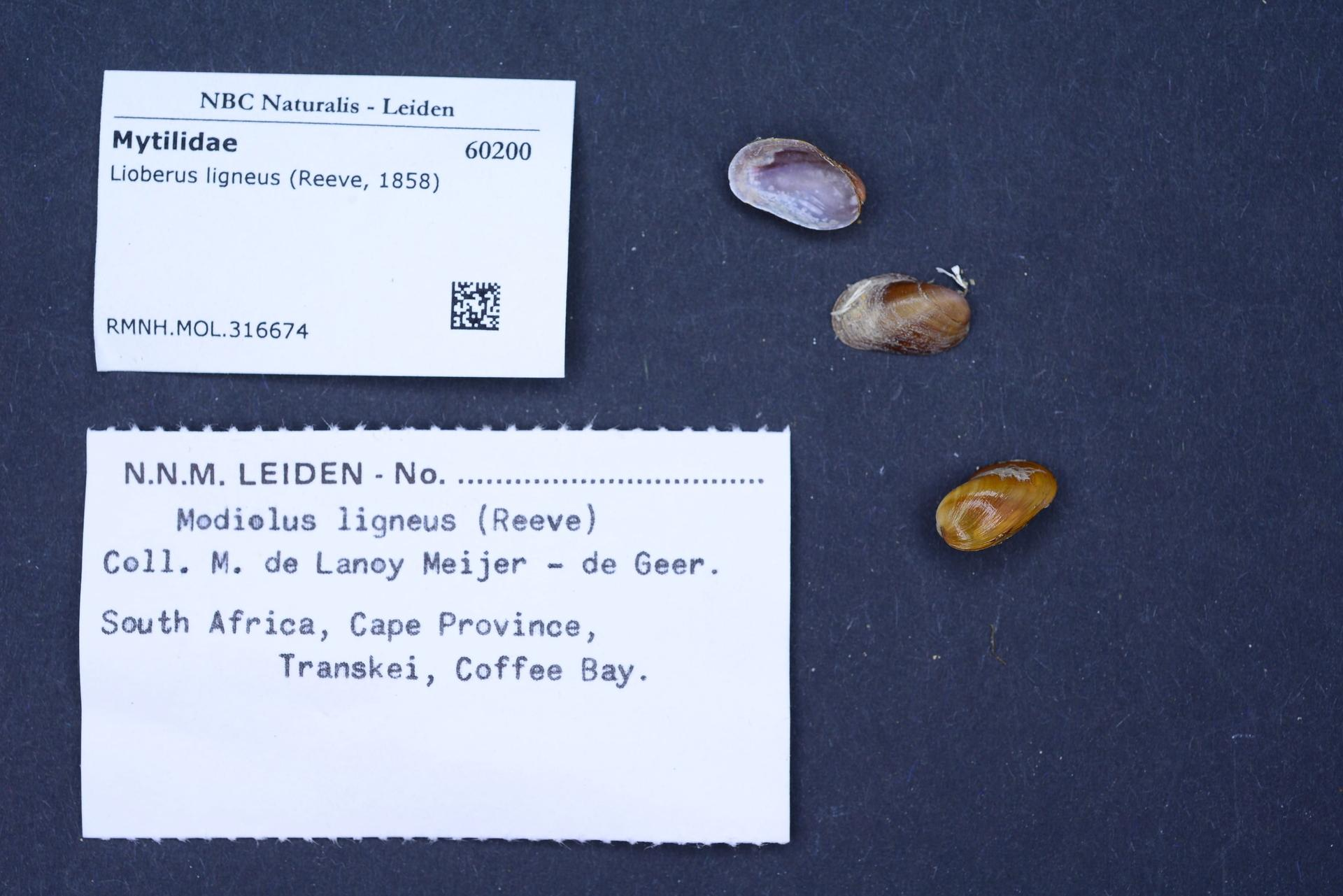

Scientific classification
- Kingdom: Animalia
- Phylum: Mollusca
- Class: Bivalvia
- Order: Mytilida
- Family: Mytilidae
- Genus: Lioberus
- Species: L. ligneus

Binomial name
- Lioberus ligneus Reeve, 1858

Synonyms
- Modiola lignea (Reeve, 1858); Modiolus ligneus Reeve, 1858; Mytilus ligneus Reeve, 1858; Perna fulgida H. Adams, 1870

= Lioberus ligneus =

Species of bivalve

Lioberus ligneus is a species of bivalve in the family Mytilidae. The scientific name of the species was first validly published in 1858 by Lovell Augustus Reeve.
