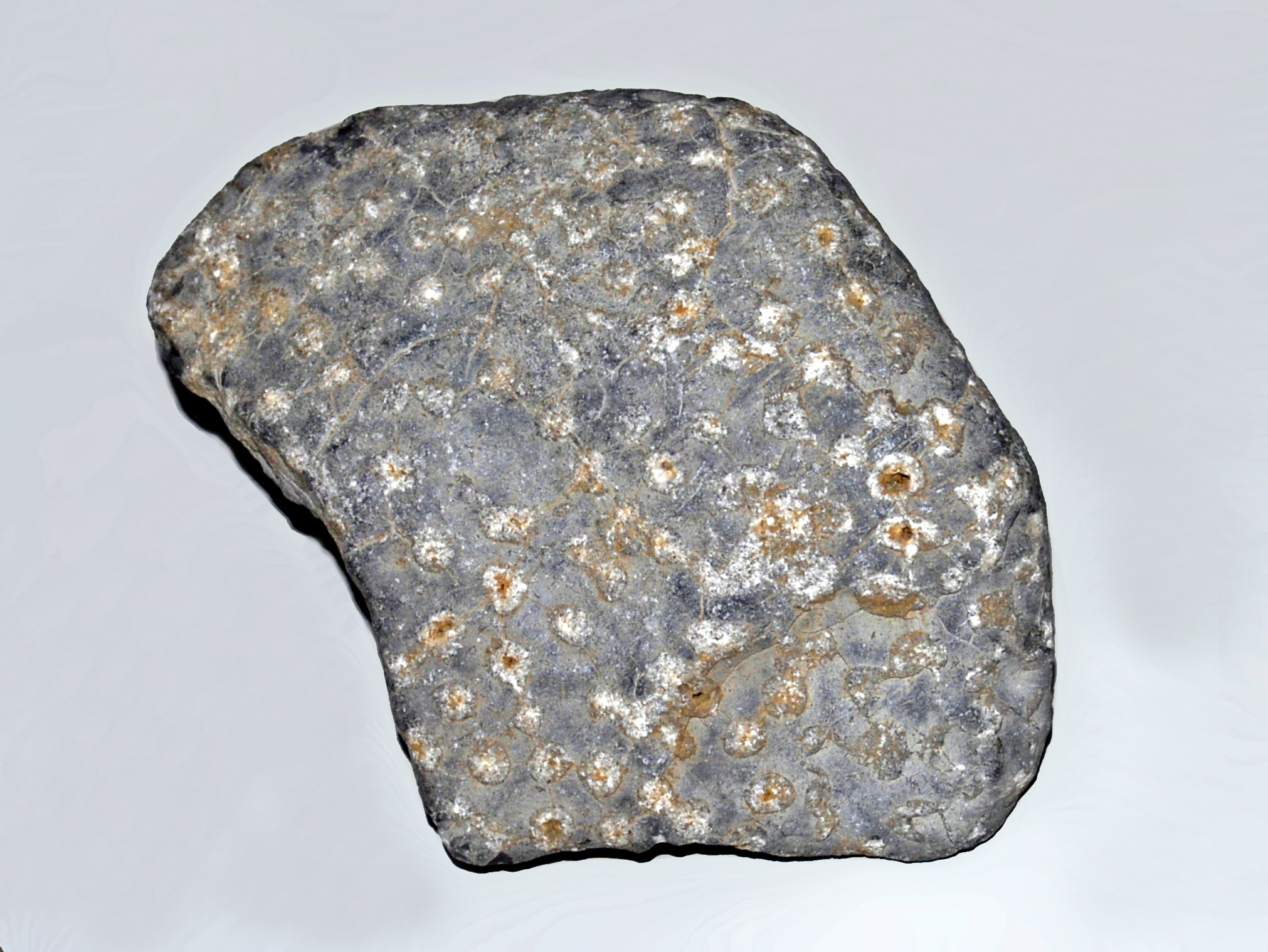
- Rhabdophyllia from Rhaetian of Italy

Scientific classification
- Domain: Eukaryota
- Kingdom: Animalia
- Phylum: Cnidaria
- Subphylum: Anthozoa
- Class: Hexacorallia
- Order: Scleractinia
- Family: †Montlivaltiidae
- Genus: †Rhabdophyllia; Milne-Edwards & Haime, 1851

= Rhabdophyllia =

Rhabdophyllia Temporal range: Jurassic – Miocene 189.6–15.9 Ma

Extinct genus of corals

Rhabdophyllia is an extinct genus of stony corals.

== Fossil records ==
This genus is known in the fossil record from the Jurassic to the Miocene (from about 189.6 to 15.9 million years ago). Fossils of species within this genus have been found in Indonesia, Iran, Europe, Pakistan, Japan and Morocco.

== Species ==
Species within this genus include:

- †Rhabdophyllia budense Kolosvary 1949
- †Rhabdophyllia flexuosa Roniewicz 1976
- †Rhabdophyllia indica Duncan 1880
- †Rhabdophyllia nariensis Duncan 1880
- †Rhabdophyllia oshimaensis Eguchi 1951
- †Rhabdophyllia phaceloida Beauvais 1986
- †Rhabdophyllia recondita Laube 1865
- †Rhabdophyllia retiformans Kühn 1933
- †Rhabdophyllia schmidti Koby 1895
