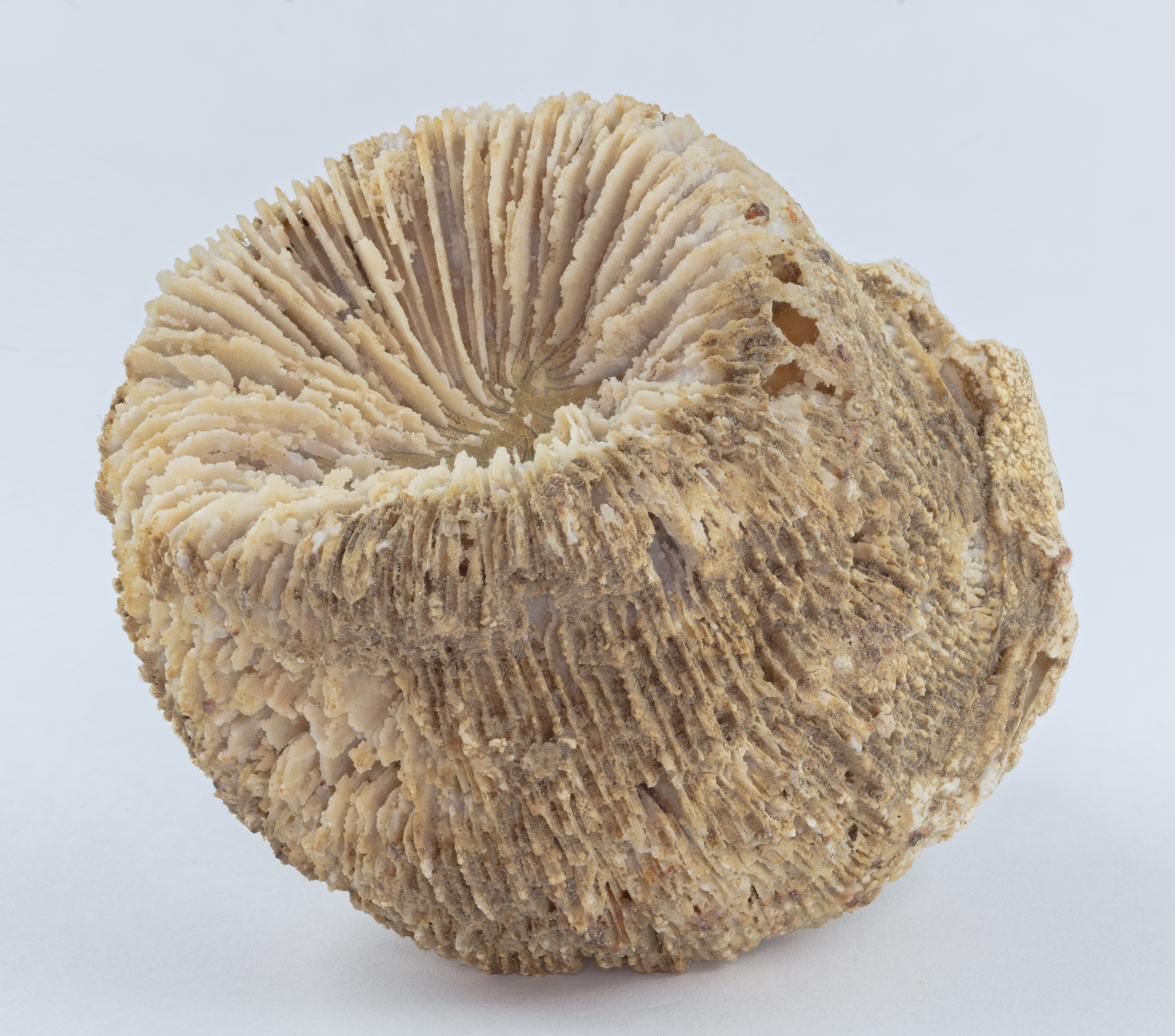
- Montlivaltia obconica from Nattheim in Germany

Scientific classification
- Kingdom: Animalia
- Phylum: Cnidaria
- Subphylum: Anthozoa
- Class: Hexacorallia
- Order: Scleractinia
- Family: †Montlivaltiidae; Dietrich, 1926

= Montlivaltiidae =

Extinct family of corals

Montlivaltiidae is an extinct family of stony corals.

== Genera ==
The following genera are classified in the family Montlivaltiidae:

- †Brevimaeandra Babaev 1964
- †Ceratothecia Turnsek 1972
- †Clausastrea d'Orbigny 1850
- †Coenotheca Quenstedt 1881
- †Complexastraeopsis Morycowa 1974
- †Complexastraeopsis Sikharulidze 1985
- †Complexastrea d'Orbigny 1850
- †Confusastrea d'Orbigny 1849
- †Cyathophyllia Fromentel 1865
- †Cyathophylliopsis Beauvais 1970
- †Dimorphocoenia de Fromentel 1857
- †Elasmophyllia d'Achiardi 1875
- †Ellipsosmilia d'Orbigny 1849
- †Goldfussastraea Beauvais 1964
- †Goldfussastrea Beauvais 1964
- †Isastrea Milne-Edwards & Haime, 1851
- †Mapucheastrea Morsch 1996
- †Margarastreopsis Beauvais 1964
- †Montlivaltia Lamouroux, 1821
- †Montlivaltiinae Dietrich 1926
- †Nerthastraea Chevalier 1961
- †Neuquinosmilia Morsch 1991
- †Paraclausastraea Zlatarski 1968
- †Paraphyllogyra Beauvais 1970
- †Peplosmilia Milne-Edwards and Haime 1850
- †Placosmilia Milne Edwards & Haime, 1848
- †Placosmiliinae Alloiteau 1952
- †Puschastraea Roniewicz 1966
- †Rhabdophyllia Milne-Edwards & Haime, 1851
- †Thecomeandra Eliasova 1973
- †Thecosmilia Milne-Edwards and Haime 1848
- †Trochophyllia Alloiteau 1952
- †Trochosmilia Milne-Edwards and Haime 1848
