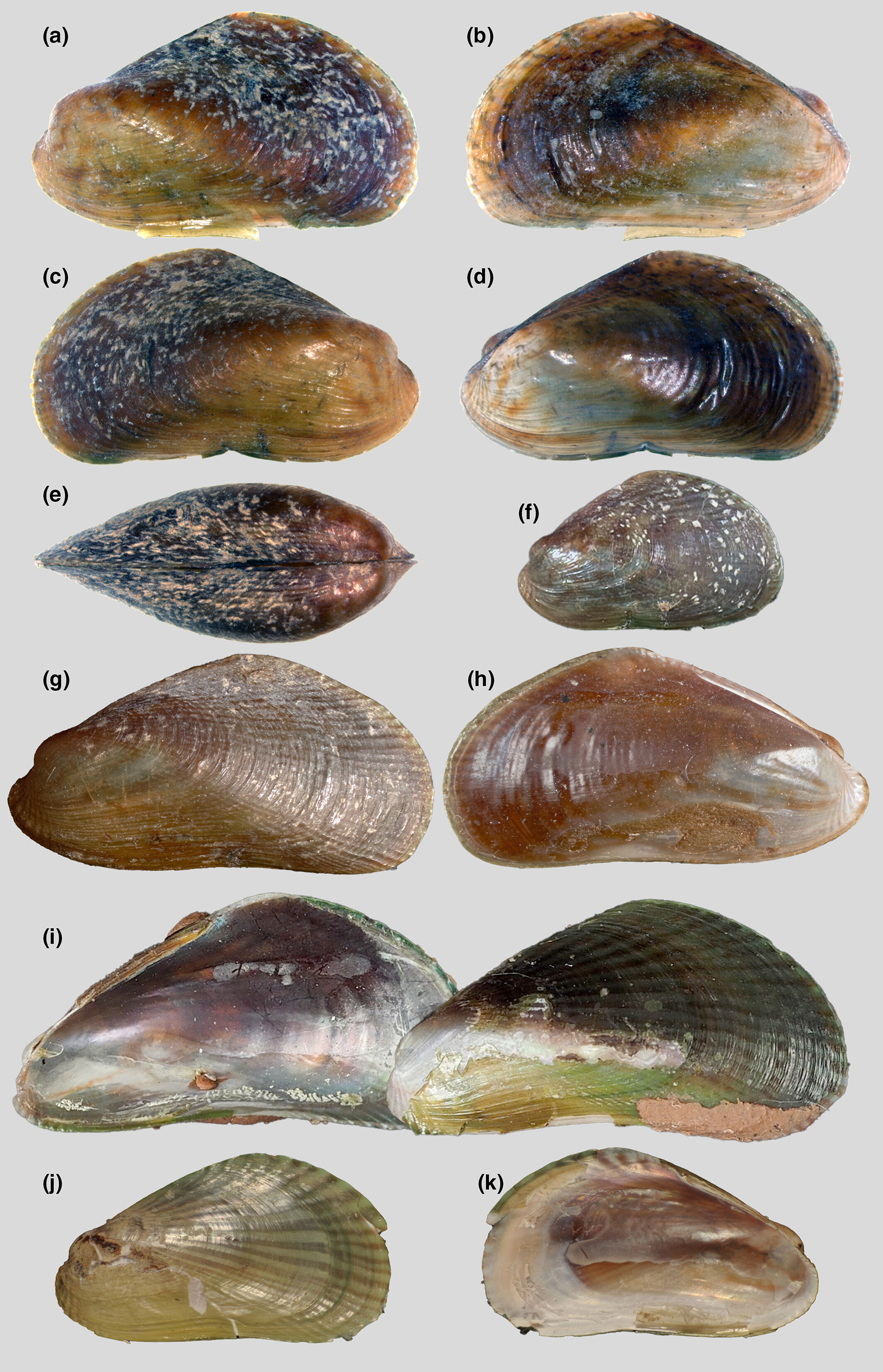
- Parabrachidontes leucostictus, the type species of Parabrachidontes

Scientific classification
- Kingdom: Animalia
- Phylum: Mollusca
- Class: Bivalvia
- Order: Mytilida
- Family: Mytilidae
- Subfamily: Crenellinae
- Genus: Parabrachidontes; Tan et al., 2023

Type species
- Parabrachidontes leucostictus E. von Martens, 1897

Species
- Parabrachidontes amnicus Tan et al., 2023; Parabrachidontes leucostictus (Preston, 1909); Parabrachidontes cochinensis (E. von Martens, 1897)

= Parabrachidontes =

Genus of bivalves

Parabrachidontes is a genus of small freshwater and brackish-water mussels in the family Mytilidae. The genus was first described in 2023 to accommodate three Southeast Asian species that form a distinct monophyletic clade within the Mytilidae, closely related to Mytella, Perna, and Arcuatula.

== Etymology ==
Parabrachidontes derives its name from the parallel evolution of radial ribs on the shell's exterior and small scalloped features (crenules) along the inner upper margins of certain species' shells, traits also observed in species belonging to the existing mussel genus Brachidontes. It is derived from the Greek prefix para- ("near") and Brachidontes, reflecting its phylogenetic proximity to Brachidontes while being morphologically and ecologically distinct.

== Species ==
The genus includes three species:

- Parabrachidontes amnicus Tan et al., 2023: a newly described species with strong radial ribs, found in freshwater habitats in southern Thailand. It has thus far only been recorded in the upper reaches of the Pak Bara River in southwest Thailand, where it inhabits low-salinity waters (2 psu). Its potential occurrence in other locations remains undocumented. This discovery suggests that Southeast Asia and Australasia host at least six mytilid species across four genera adapted to freshwater and weakly estuarine environments: Limnoperna fortunei, L. siamensis, Sinomytilus harmandi, Parabrachidontes amnicus, P. leucostictus, and Xenostrobus securis.
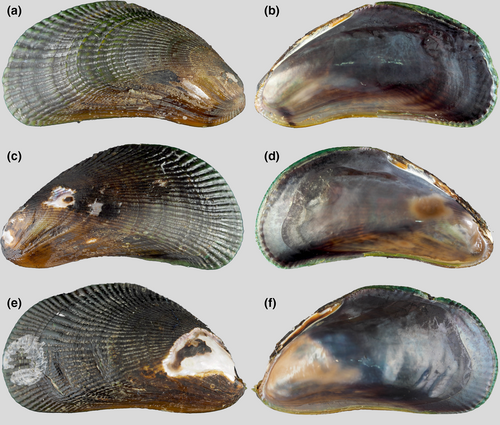
  Parabrachidontes amnicus sp. n., Khlong Pak Bara, Satun Province, Thailand.
- Parabrachidontes leucostictus (Preston, 1909): previously classified under Modiolus, this species has weak radial ribs and inhabits freshwater and low-salinity environments in Thailand, Malaysia, and Indonesia. P. leucostictus was originally described as Modiola cochinensis (Preston, 1909) and described by Tan et al. (2023).
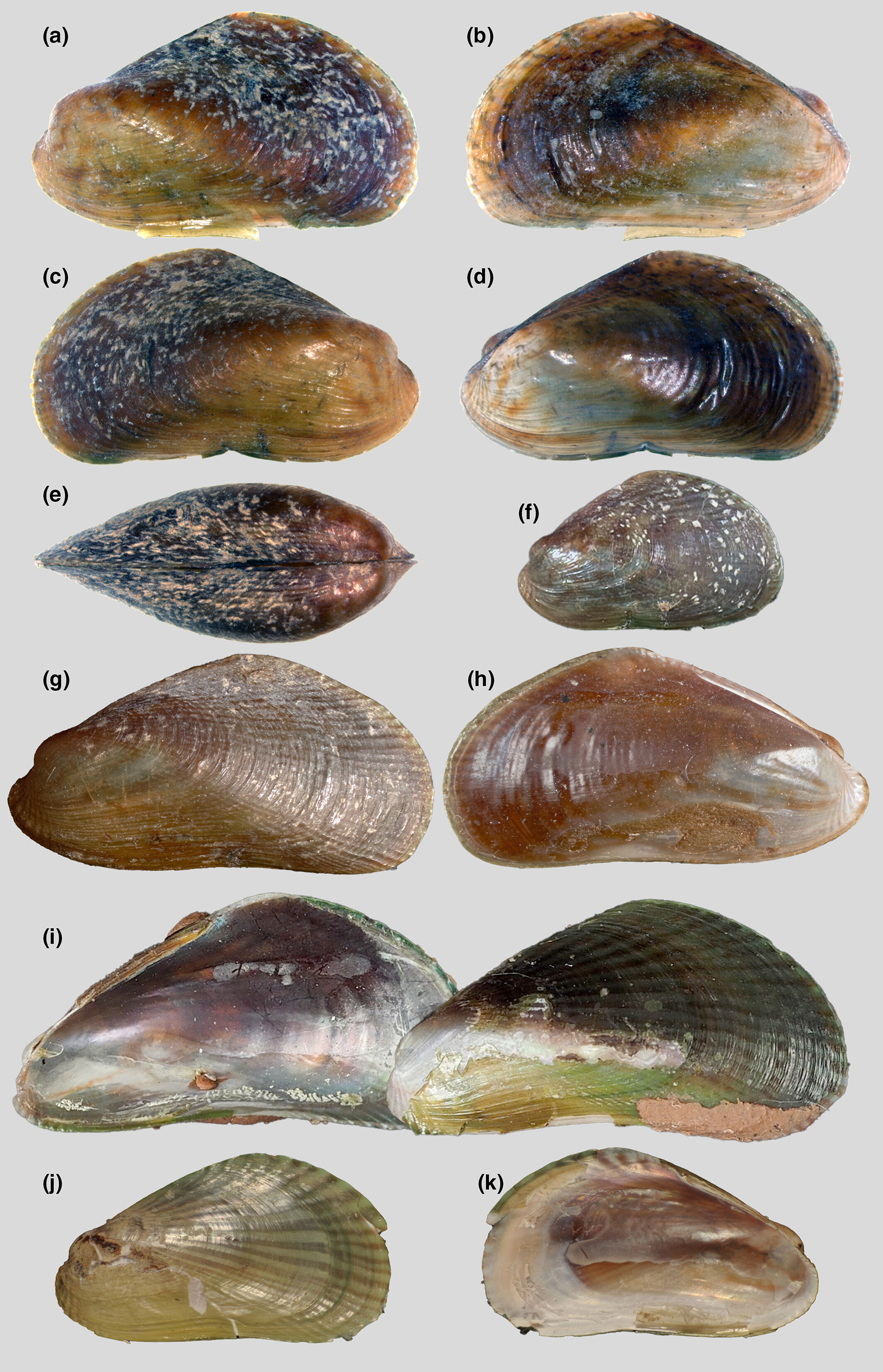
  Parabrachidontes leucostictus (von Martens, 1897).
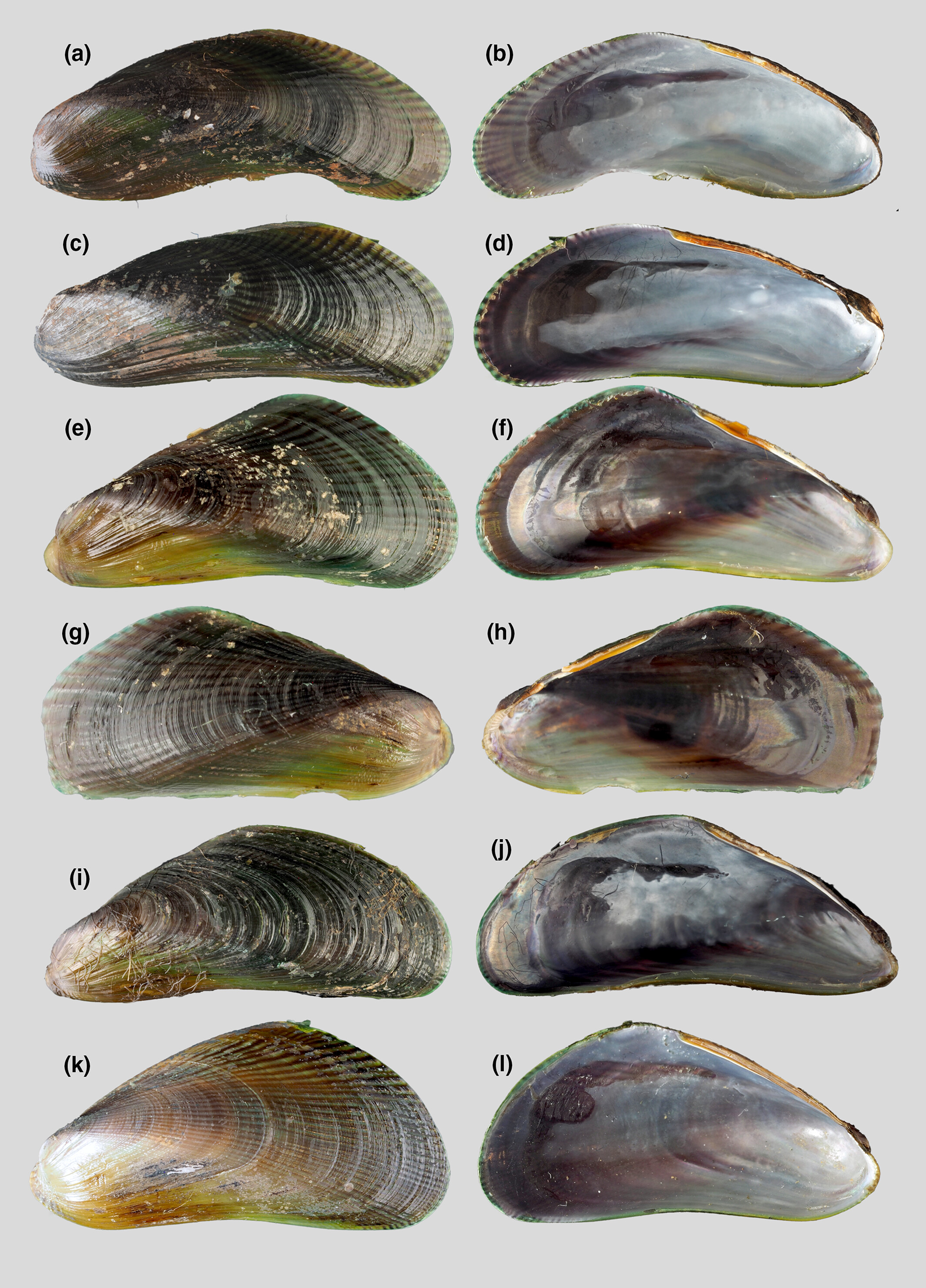
  Parabrachidontes leucostictus (von Martens, 1897)
- Parabrachidontes cochinensis (E. von Martens, 1897): a smooth-shelled estuarine species found in India, Thailand, Singapore, and Indonesia. It has been recently documented in several locations: its type locality in the Cochin backwaters of Kerala, India; the Johor Strait in Singapore; and the Pute River near Makassar, South Sulawesi, Indonesia. Unlike its congeners P. amnicus and P. leucostictus, available evidence suggests P. cochinensis does not inhabit fully freshwater environments, being restricted to brackish water habitats. P. cochinensis was originally described as Modiola leucosticta (E. von Martens, 1897) and rescribed by Tan et al. (2023).
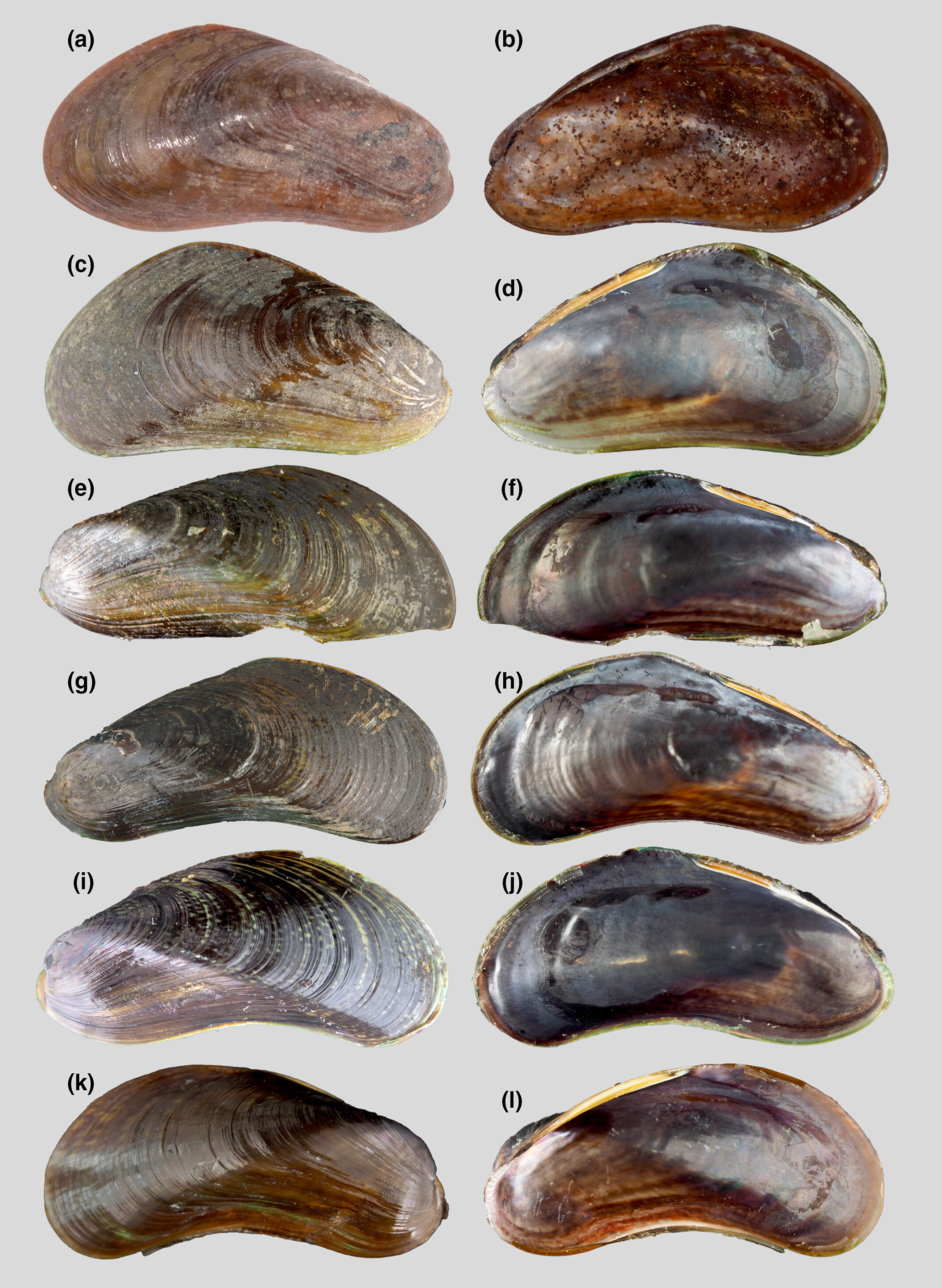
  Parabrachidontes cochinensis (Preston, 1909)

== Morphology ==
=== Shell ===
The three Parabrachidontes species share similar small shells (<30 mm) with subterminal umbones (usually subterminal in position), but exhibit distinct external features, with their shape varying from mytiliform (mussel-like) to modioliform (elongate-oval). Their surface may be smooth or feature radial ribs of varying prominence, often accompanied by fine, closely spaced commarginal growth lines. P. amnicus displays dark brown shells with greenish tones, characterised by prominent radial ribs separated by deep grooves. P. leucostictus shows weaker, dark brown or black radial ribs defined by faint greenish grooves. P. cochinensis lacks radial ribs entirely, presenting instead a speckled surface with only concentric growth lines.

All three species share several internal shell features:

- A short series of small teeth both anterior and posterior to the ligament;
- Subterminal umbones positioned slightly behind the shell's anterior edge;
- Consistent shell microstructure consisting of:
  - A thin (10-15 μm) outer homogeneous layer (likely calcite);
  - A thicker (250-300 μm) middle nacreous layer (aragonite);
  - An inner simple prismatic myostracum (aragonite).

Mineralogical analysis shows the shells are predominantly aragonite (86-99%), with minor calcite components (0.8-3.0%) present in all species.

=== Anatomy ===
The shells of Parabrachidontes species exhibit an iridescent interior with distinctive dental features: approximately twelve slender, closely spaced teeth anterior to the ligament and seven papillate crenules posterior to it. The ligament is internal and narrow, lacking resilial pits, while the posterior adductor muscle scar merges with a single, narrow posterior byssal retractor scar. Shell microstructure consists of three layers: a thin outer calcitic layer (10-15 μm), a thick middle nacreous layer (250-300 μm), and an inner prismatic myostracum.

All species display identical gill morphology, with the ascending lamella of the outer demibranch being shorter than the descending lamella and fused to the adjacent mantle lobe. The inner demibranch's ascending lamella may also attach to the visceral mass in some specimens. Notably, plicate glands are absent across the genus. The pericardium consistently occupies the space between the anterior and posterior muscle groups of the posterior byssal retractor complex (Category 3 morphology). All three species possess pigmented exhalant siphon tips, though pigmentation intensity varies considerably in P. leucostictus and P. cochinensis.

Parabrachidontes amnicus is uniquely characterized by up to ten simple guard papillae lining its inhalant siphon margin, a feature entirely absent in its congeners. However, the exhalant siphon morphology of living P. amnicus specimens remains undocumented. Shell surface patterns provide additional diagnostic characters: P. amnicus shows prominent radial ribs, P. leucostictus displays faint ribbing, while P. cochinensis lacks ribs entirely, bearing only commarginal striae.

== Characteristics ==
Species under the genus Parabrachidontes share the following characteristics.

Shell surface	Ribbed-smooth
Crenules behind ligament	Yes
Dysodont teeth at anterior end of valves	Yes
Position of anterior adductor muscle scar	Antero-ventral
Resilial pits along ligament	No
Ctenidial attachment scars	No
Plicate gland	Absent
Ascending lamellae of outer demibranch attached to mantle	Yes
Ascending lamellae of inner demibranch attached to visceral mass	Yes
Number of distinct byssal-foot retractor muscle bundles	2
Position of heart in relation to byssal-foot retractor muscle bundles	Cat 3

== Type specimens ==
Species belonging to the Parabrachidontes genus are defined by the following type material:

- Parabrachidontes amnicus Tan et al., 2023:
  - Holotype: PMBC 30680 (deposited at the Phuket Marine Biological Centre);
  - Paratype: PMBC 30681 (same repository);
- Parabrachidontes cochinensis (Preston, 1909):
  - Basionym: Modiola cochinensis Preston, 1909;
- Parabrachidontes leucostictus (von Martens, 1897):
  - Basionym: Modiola leucosticta E. von Martens, 1897;
  - Holotype: ZMA Moll. 135170 (deposited at the Zoological Museum Amsterdam), collected from Maros River, South Sulawesi, Indonesia;
  - Paratypes: ZMB Moll. 108.841 (Museum für Naturkunde, Berlin).

== Evolution ==
Molecular phylogenetics places Parabrachidontes within Clade M2 of the Mytilidae, distinct from other freshwater and brackish-water lineages such as Limnoperninae (Limnoperna, Sinomytilus) and Xenostrobinae (Xenostrobus). Genetic distances between Parabrachidontes species (0.130-0.150) are comparable to interspecific differences in Perna.

The genus represents a third independent evolutionary transition to freshwater/brackish habitats among mytilids, parallel to the subfamilies Limnoperninae and Xenostrobinae. Retention of the outer calcitic shell layer may represent an adaptation to calcium-rich tropical freshwater systems, potentially enhancing shell stability in these environments. This combination of anatomical features and ecological specialization distinguishes Parabrachidontes from related marine mussel lineages.

== Distribution ==
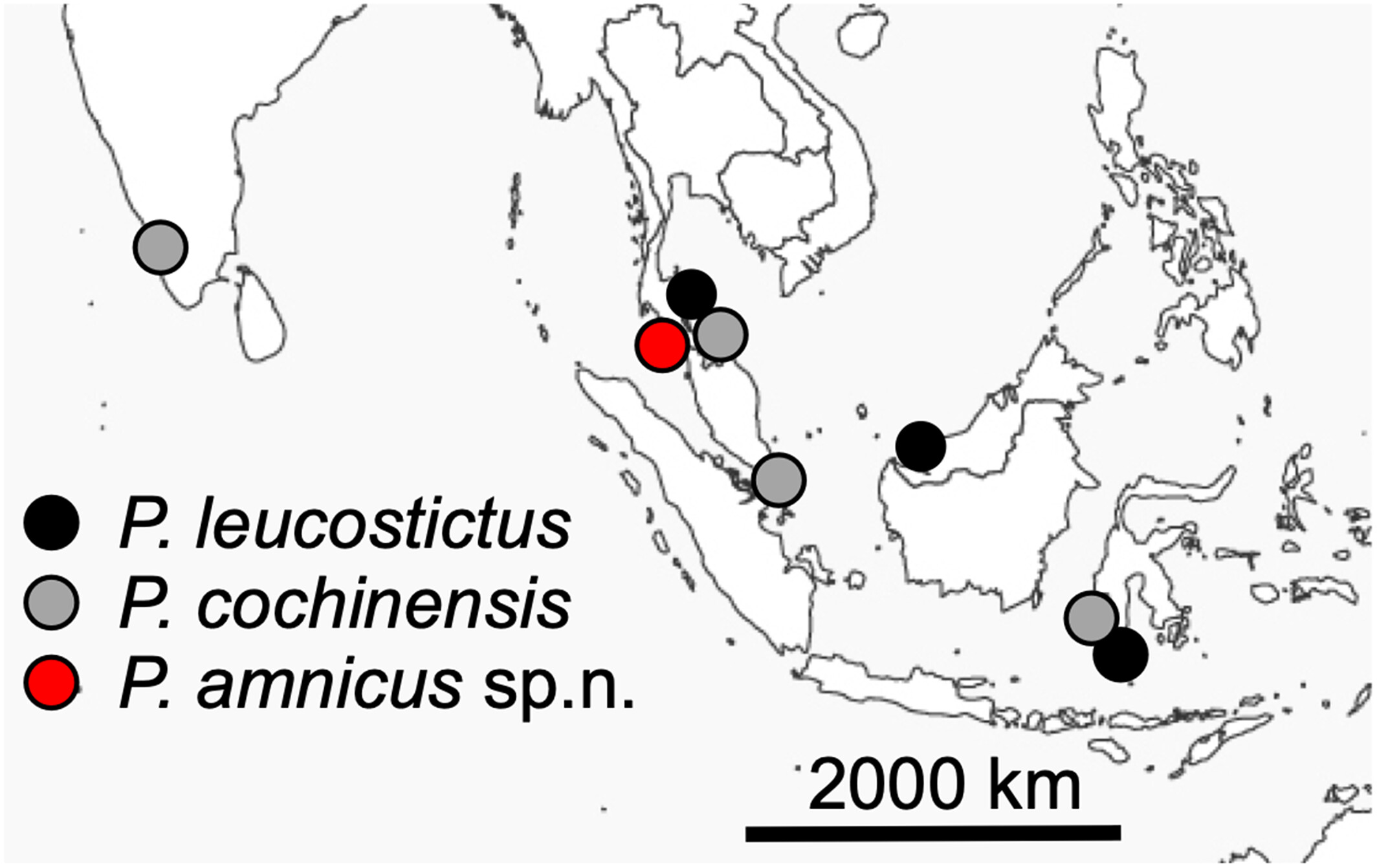
Distribution of Parabrachidontes species in South and Southeast Asia.

Existing specimens of Parabrachidontes species were collected from fresh- and brackish-water habitats in Southeast Asia, and specifically southern Thailand, Singapore, East Malaysia (northern Borneo) and south Sulawesi (Indonesia). Two of the three species occur in salinities below 3 psu.
