= Shell growth in estuaries =

Aspect of marine biology

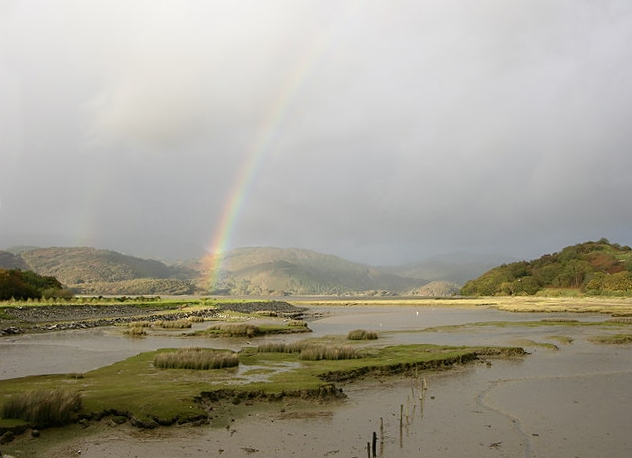
Temperature and salinity variations produced by ocean tides and freshwater rivers in estuaries make them ideal habitats for studying how temperature and salinity affect the growth of shells. Image shows the estuary of the River Mawddach in North Wales.

Shell growth in estuaries is an aspect of marine biology that has attracted a number of scientific research studies. Many groups of marine organisms produce calcified exoskeletons, commonly known as shells, hard calcium carbonate structures which the organisms rely on for various specialized structural and defensive purposes. The rate at which these shells form is greatly influenced by physical and chemical characteristics of the water in which these organisms live. Estuaries are dynamic habitats which expose their inhabitants to a wide array of rapidly changing physical conditions, exaggerating the differences in physical and chemical properties of the water.

Estuaries have large variation in salinity, ranging from entirely fresh water upstream to fully marine water at the ocean boundary. Estuarine systems also experience daily, tidal and seasonal swings in temperature, which affect many of the chemical characteristics of the water and in turn affect the metabolic and calcifying processes of shell-producing organisms. Temperature and salinity affect the carbonate balance of the water, influencing carbonate equilibrium, calcium carbonate solubility and the saturation states of calcite and aragonite. The tidal influences and shallow water of estuaries mean that estuarine organisms experience wide variations in temperature, salinity and other aspects of water chemistry; these fluctuations make the estuarine habitat ideal for studies on the influence of changing physical and chemical conditions on processes such as shell deposition. Changing conditions in estuaries and coastal regions are especially relevant to human interests, because about 50% of global calcification and 90% of fish catch occurs in these locations.

A substantial proportion of larger marine calcifying organisms are molluscs: bivalves, gastropods and chitons. Cnidarians such as corals, echinoderms such as sea urchins, and arthropods such as barnacles also produce shells in coastal ecosystems. Most of these groups are benthic, living on hard or soft substrates at the bottom of the estuary. Some are attached, like barnacles or corals; some move around on the surface like urchins or gastropods; and some live inside the sediment, like most of the bivalve species.

Minute pelagic species in the phyla Foraminifera and Radiolaria also produce ornate calcareous skeletons. Many benthic mollusks have planktonic larvae called veligers that have calcareous shells, and these larvae are particularly vulnerable to changes in water chemistry; their shells are so thin that small changes in pH can have a large impact on their ability to survive. Some holoplankton (organisms that are planktonic for their full lives) have calcareous skeletons as well, and are even more susceptible to unfavorable shell deposition conditions, since they spend their entire lives in the water column.

== Details of carbonate usage ==
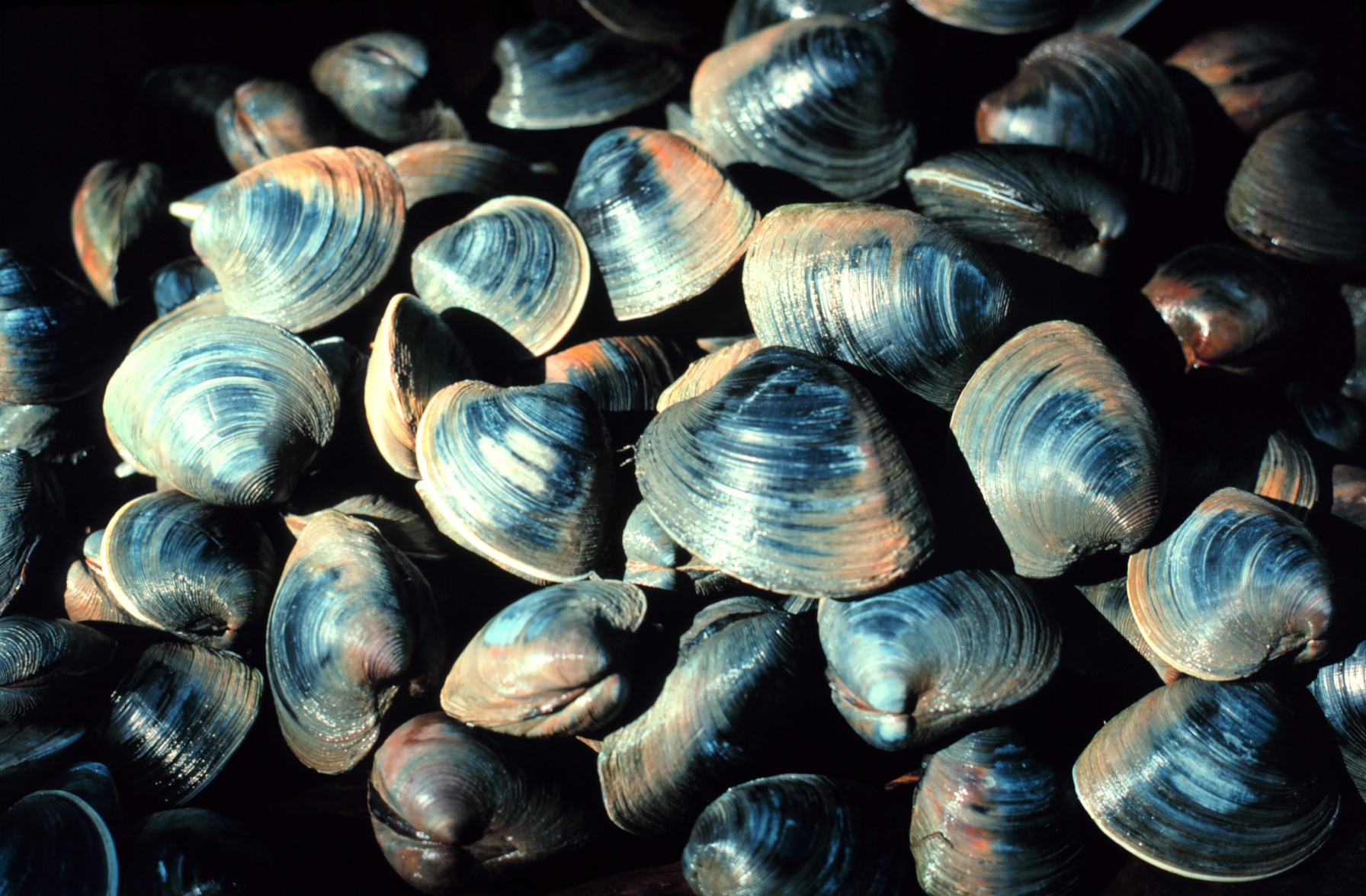
The saltwater clam known as the Northern quahog, Mercenaria mercenaria, thrives in the muddy sands of estuaries.

There are several variations in calcium carbonate (CaCO_{3}) skeletons, including the two different crystalline forms, calcite and aragonite, as well as other elements which can become incorporated into the mineral matrix, altering its properties. Calcite is a hexagonal form of CaCO_{3} that is softer and less dense than aragonite, which has a rhombic form. Calcite is the more stable form of CaCO_{3} and is less soluble in water under standard temperature and pressure than aragonite, with a solubility product constant (K_{sp}) of 10^{−8.48} compared to 10^{−8.28} for aragonite. This means that a greater proportion of aragonite will dissolve in water, producing calcium (Ca^{2+}) and carbonate (CO^{2−}_{3}) ions. The amount of magnesium (Mg) incorporated into the mineral matrix during calcium carbonate deposition can also alter the properties of the shell, because magnesium inhibits calcium deposition by inhibiting nucleation of calcite and aragonite. Skeletons with significant amounts of magnesium incorporated into the matrix (greater than 12%) are more soluble, so the presence of this mineral can negatively impact shell durability, which is why some organisms remove magnesium from the water during the calcification process.

== Influencing factors ==
Food availability can alter shell growth patterns, as can chemical cues from predators, which cause clams, snails and oysters to produce thicker shells. There are costs to producing thicker shells as protection, including the energetic expense of calcification, limits on somatic growth, and reduced growth rates in terms of shell length. In order to minimize the significant energetic expense of shell formation, several calcifying species reduce shell production by producing porous shells or spines and ridges as more economical forms of predator defense.

Temperature and salinity also affect shell growth by altering organismal processes, including metabolism and shell magnesium (Mg) incorporation, as well as water chemistry in terms of calcium carbonate solubility, CaCO_{3} saturation states, ion-pairing, alkalinity and carbonate equilibrium. This is especially relevant in estuaries, where salinities range from 0 to 35, and other water properties such as temperature and nutrient composition also vary widely during the transition from fresh river water to saline ocean water. Acidity (pH) and carbonate saturation states also reach extremes in estuarine systems, making these habitats a natural testing ground for the impacts of chemical changes on the calcification of shelled organisms.

== Carbonate and shell deposition ==
Calcium carbonate
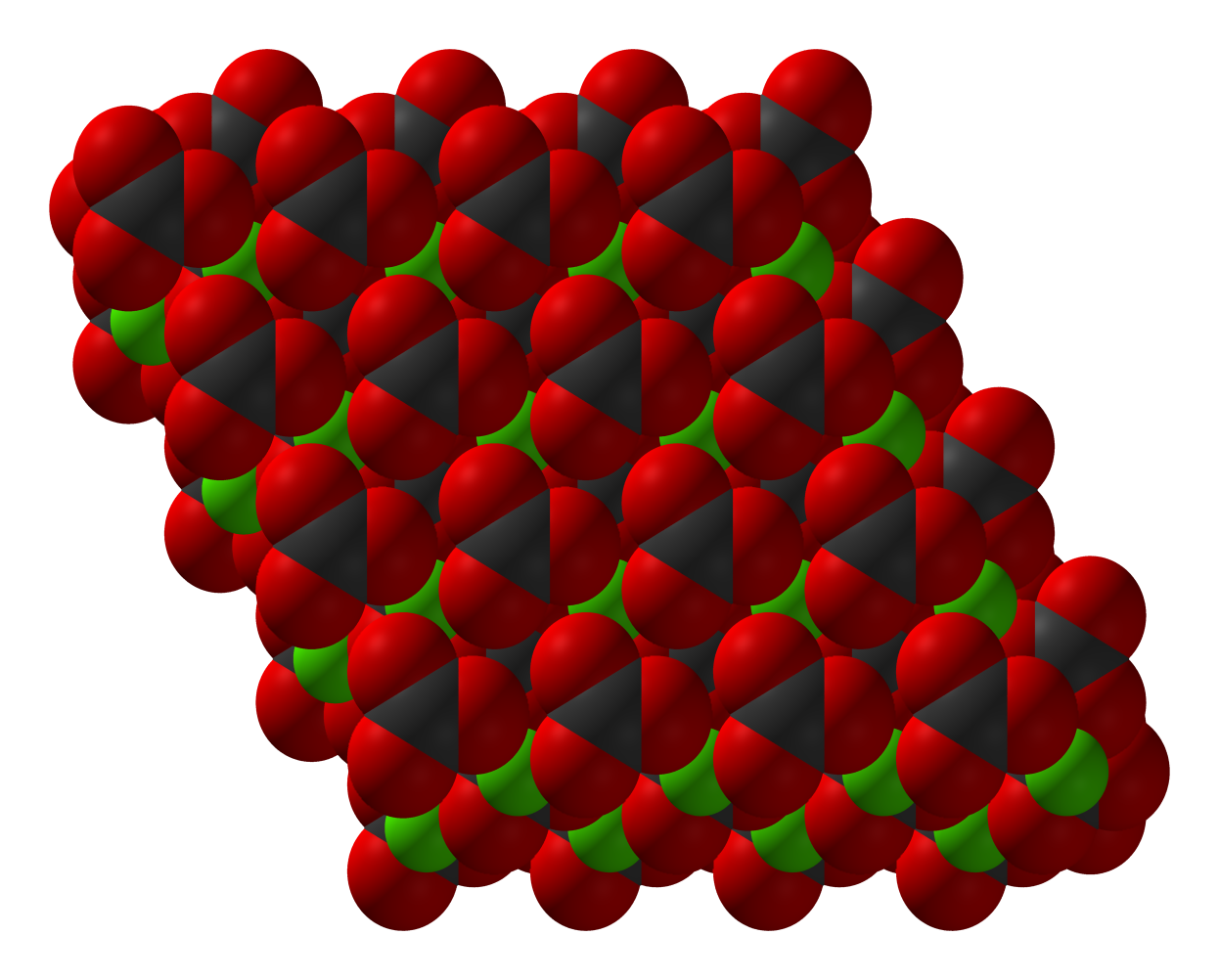

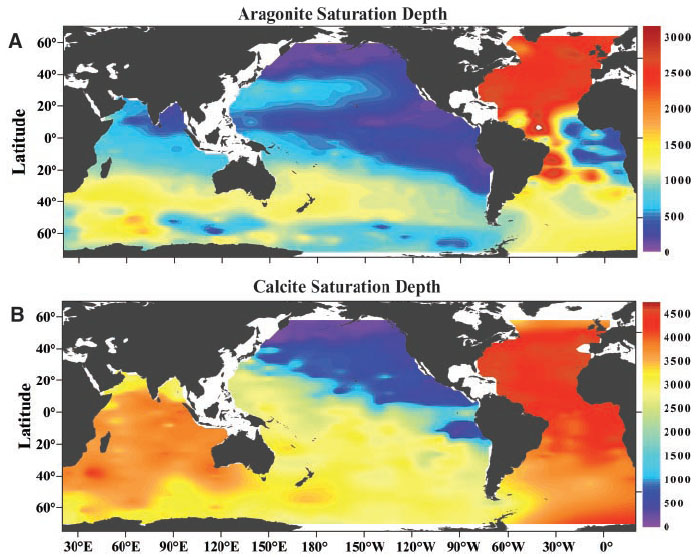
Distribution of (A) aragonite and (B) calcite saturation depth in the global oceans

Calcification rates are largely related to the amount of available carbonate (CO_{3}^{2−}) ions in the water, and this is linked to the relative amounts of (and reactions between) different types of carbonate. Carbon dioxide from the atmosphere and from respiration of animals in estuarine and marine environments quickly reacts in water to form carbonic acid, H_{2}CO_{3}. Carbonic acid then dissociates into bicarbonate (HCO^{−}_{3}) and releases hydrogen ions, and the equilibrium constant for this equation is referred to as K_{1}. Bicarbonate dissociates into carbonate (CO^{2−}_{3}), releasing another hydrogen ion (H^{+}), with an equilibrium constant known as K_{2}. The equilibrium constants refer to the ratio of products to reactants produced in these reactions, so the constants K_{1} and K_{2} govern the relative amounts of different carbonate compounds in the water.

H_{2}CO_{3} ⇌ H^{+} + HCO^{−}_{3} K_{1} = ([H^{+}][HCO^{−}_{3}])/ [H_{2}CO_{3}]

HCO^{−}_{3} ⇌ H^{+} + CO^{2−}_{3} K_{2} = ([H^{+}][CO^{2−}_{3}])/( [HCO^{−}_{3}])

Since alkalinity, or acid-buffering capacity, of the water is regulated by the number of hydrogen ions that a cation can accept, carbonate (can accept 2 H^{+}) and bicarbonate (can accept 1 H^{+}) are the principal components of alkalinity in estuarine and marine systems. Since acidic conditions promote shell dissolution, the alkalinity of the water is positively correlated with shell deposition, especially in estuarine regions that experience broad swings in pH. Based on the carbonate equilibrium equations, an increase in K_{2} leads to higher levels of available carbonate and a potential increase in calcification rates as a result. The values for K_{1} and K_{2} can be influenced by several different physical factors, including temperature, salinity and pressure, so organisms in different habitats can encounter different equilibrium conditions. Many of these same factors influence solubility of calcium carbonate, with the solubility product constant K_{sp} expressed as the concentration of dissolved calcium and carbonate ions at equilibrium:

K_{sp} = [Ca^{2+}][CO^{2−}_{3}].

Therefore, increases in K_{sp} based on differences in temperature or pressure or increases in the apparent solubility constant K’_{sp} as a result of salinity or pH changes means that calcium carbonate is more soluble. Increased solubility of CaCO_{3} makes shell deposition more difficult, and so this has a negative impact on the calcification process.

The saturation state of calcium carbonate also has a strong influence on shell deposition, with calcification only occurring when the water is saturated or supersaturated with CaCO_{3}, based on the formula:

Ω = ([CO^{2−}_{3}][Ca^{2+}])/K’_{sp}.

Higher saturation states mean higher concentrations of carbonate and calcium relative to the solubility of calcium carbonate, favoring shell deposition. The two forms of CaCO_{3} have different saturation states, with the more soluble aragonite displaying a lower saturation state than calcite. Since aragonite is more soluble than calcite and solubility increases with pressure, the depth at which the ocean is undersaturated with aragonite (aragonite compensation depth) is shallower than the depth at which it is undersaturated with calcite (calcite compensation depth). As a result, aragonite-based organisms live in shallower environments. Calcification rate does not change much with saturation levels above 300%. Since saturation state can be affected by both solubility and carbonate ion concentrations, it can be strongly impacted by environmental factors such as temperature and salinity.

== Effect of temperature on calcification ==
Water temperatures vary widely on a seasonal basis in polar and temperate habitats, inducing metabolic changes in organisms exposed to these conditions. Seasonal temperature swings are even more drastic in estuaries than in the open ocean due to the large surface area of shallow water as well as the differential temperature of ocean and river water. During the summer, rivers are often warmer than the ocean, so there is a gradient of decreasing temperature towards the ocean in an estuary. This switches in the winter, with ocean waters being much warmer than river water, producing the opposite temperature gradient. Temperature is changing on a larger time scale as well, with predicted temperature changes slowly increasing both freshwater and marine water sources (though at variable rates), further enhancing the impact that temperature has on shell deposition processes in estuarine environments.

=== Solubility product ===
Temperature has a strong effect on the solubility product constants for both calcite and aragonite, with an approximately 20% decrease in K’_{sp} from 0 to 25 °C. The lower solubility constants for calcite and aragonite with elevated temperature have a positive impact on calcium carbonate precipitation and deposition, making it easier for calcifying organisms to produce shells in water with lower solubility of calcium carbonate. Temperature can also influence the calcite:aragonite ratios, as aragonite precipitation rates are more strongly tied to temperature, with aragonite precipitation dominating above 6 °C.

=== Saturation state ===
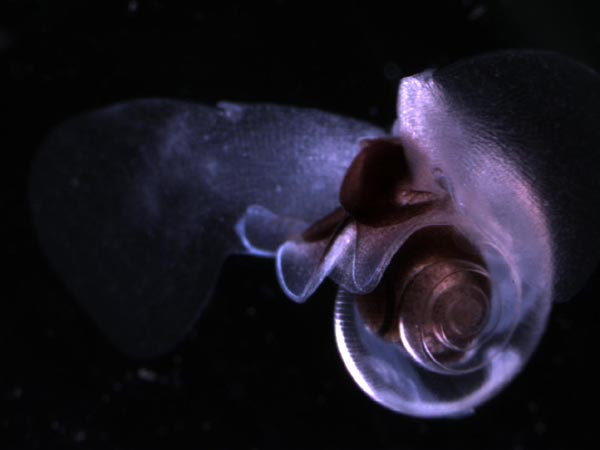
Limacina helicina, a pteropod

Temperature also has a large impact on the saturation state of calcium carbonate species, as the level of disequilibrium (degree of saturation) strongly influences reaction rates. Comeau et al. point out that cold locations such as the Arctic show the most dramatic decreases in aragonite saturation state (Ω) associated with climate change. This particularly affects pteropods since they have thin aragonite shells and are the dominant planktonic species in cold Arctic waters. There is a positive correlation between temperature and calcite saturation state for the eastern oyster Crassostrea virginica, which produces a shell primarily composed of calcite. While oysters are benthic and use calcite instead of aragonite (like pteropods), there is still a clear increase in both calcite saturation level and oyster calcification rate at the higher temperature treatments.

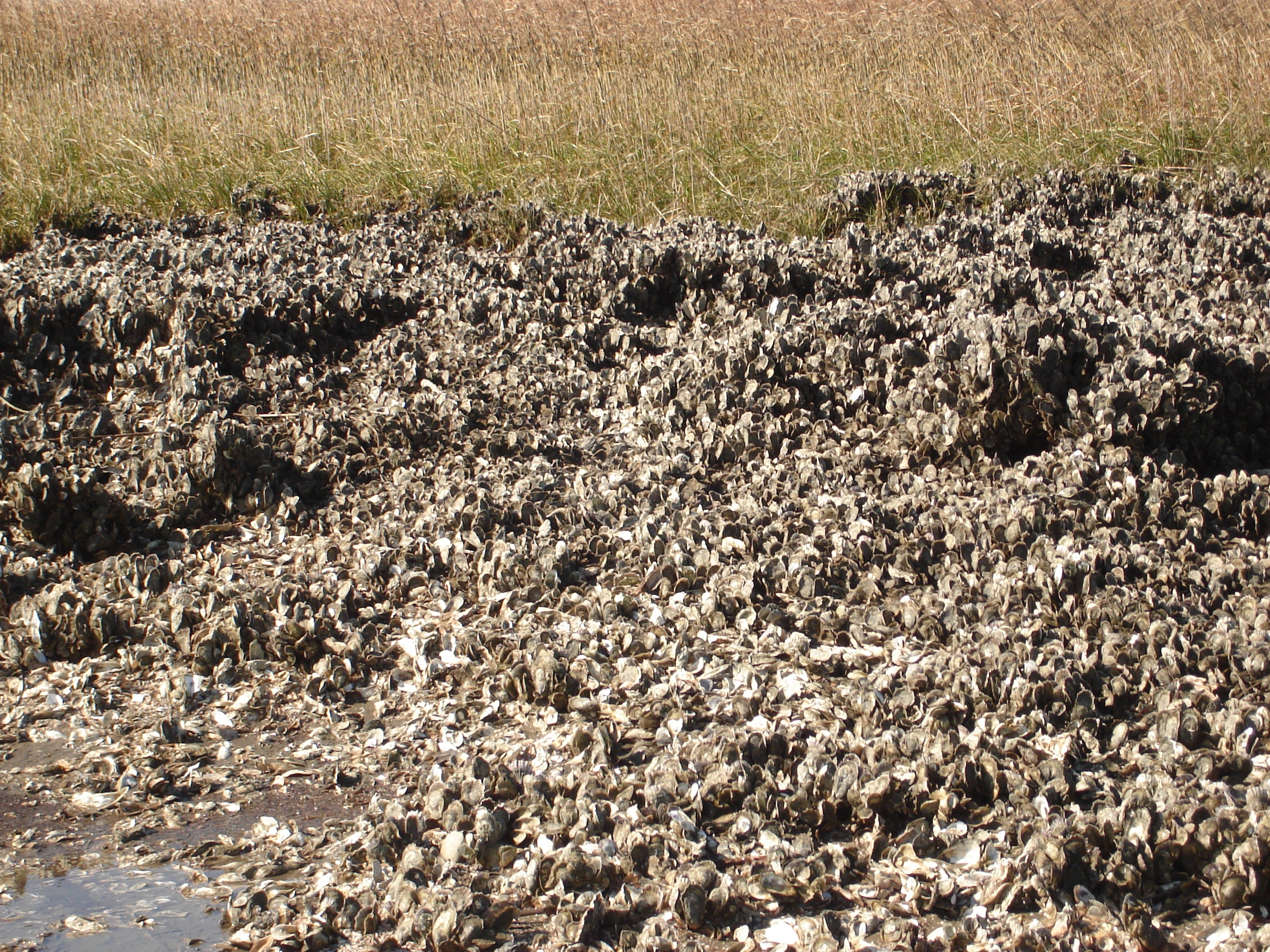
A bed of Crassostrea virginica on Cockspur Island, Georgia

In addition to impacting the solubility and saturation state of calcite and aragonite, temperature can alter the composition of shell or calcified skeletons, especially influencing the incorporation of magnesium (Mg) into the mineral matrix. Magnesium content of carbonate skeletons (as MgCO_{3}) increases with temperature, explaining a third of the variation in sea star Mg:Ca ratios. This is important because when more than 8–12% of a calcite-dominated skeleton is composed of MgCO_{3}, the shell material is more soluble than aragonite. As a result of the positive correlation between temperature and Mg content, organisms that live in colder environments such as the deep sea and high latitudes have a lower percentage of MgCO_{3} incorporated into their shells.

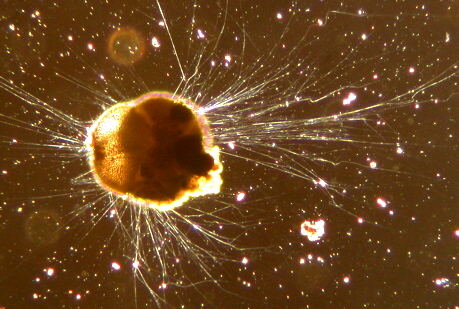
Live Ammonia tepida (Foraminifera)

Even small temperature changes such as those predicted under global warming scenarios can influence Mg:Ca ratios, as the foraminiferan Ammonia tepida increases its Mg:Ca ratio 4-5% per degree of temperature elevation. This response is not limited to animals or open ocean species, since crustose coralline algae also increase their incorporation of magnesium and therefore their solubility at elevated temperatures.

=== Shell deposition ===
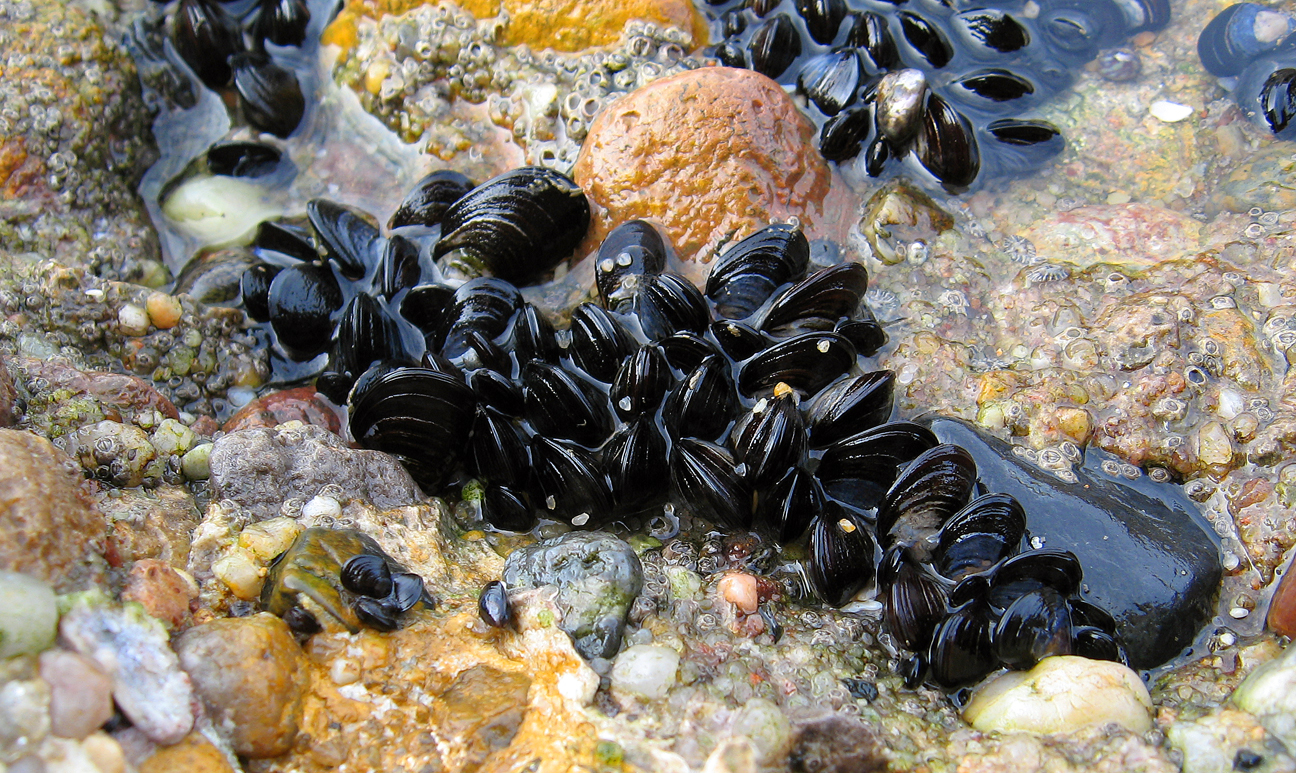
Mytilus edulis on a hard substrate

Between the effect that temperature has on Mg:Ca ratios as well as on solubility and saturation state of calcite and aragonite, it is clear that short- or long-term temperature variations can influence the deposition of calcium carbonate by altering seawater chemistry. The impact that these temperature-induced chemical changes have on shell deposition has been repeatedly demonstrated for a wide array of organisms that inhabit estuarine and coastal systems, highlighting the cumulative effect of all temperature-influenced factors.

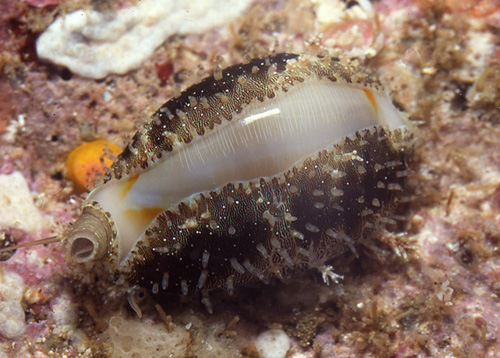
A live Monetaria annulus

The blue mussel Mytilus edulis is a major space occupier on hard substrates on the east coast of North America and west coast of Europe, and the calcification rate of this species increases up to five times with rising temperature. Eastern oysters and crustose coralline algae have also been shown to increase their calcification rates with elevated temperature, though this can have varied effects on the morphology of the organism.

Schone et al. (2006) found that the barnacle Chthamalus fissus and mussel Mytella guyanensis showed faster shell elongation rates at higher temperature, with over 50% of this variability in shell growth explained by temperature changes. The cowry (a sea snail) Monetaria annulus displayed a positive correlation between sea surface temperature (SST) and the thickness of the callus, the outer surface of juvenile shells.

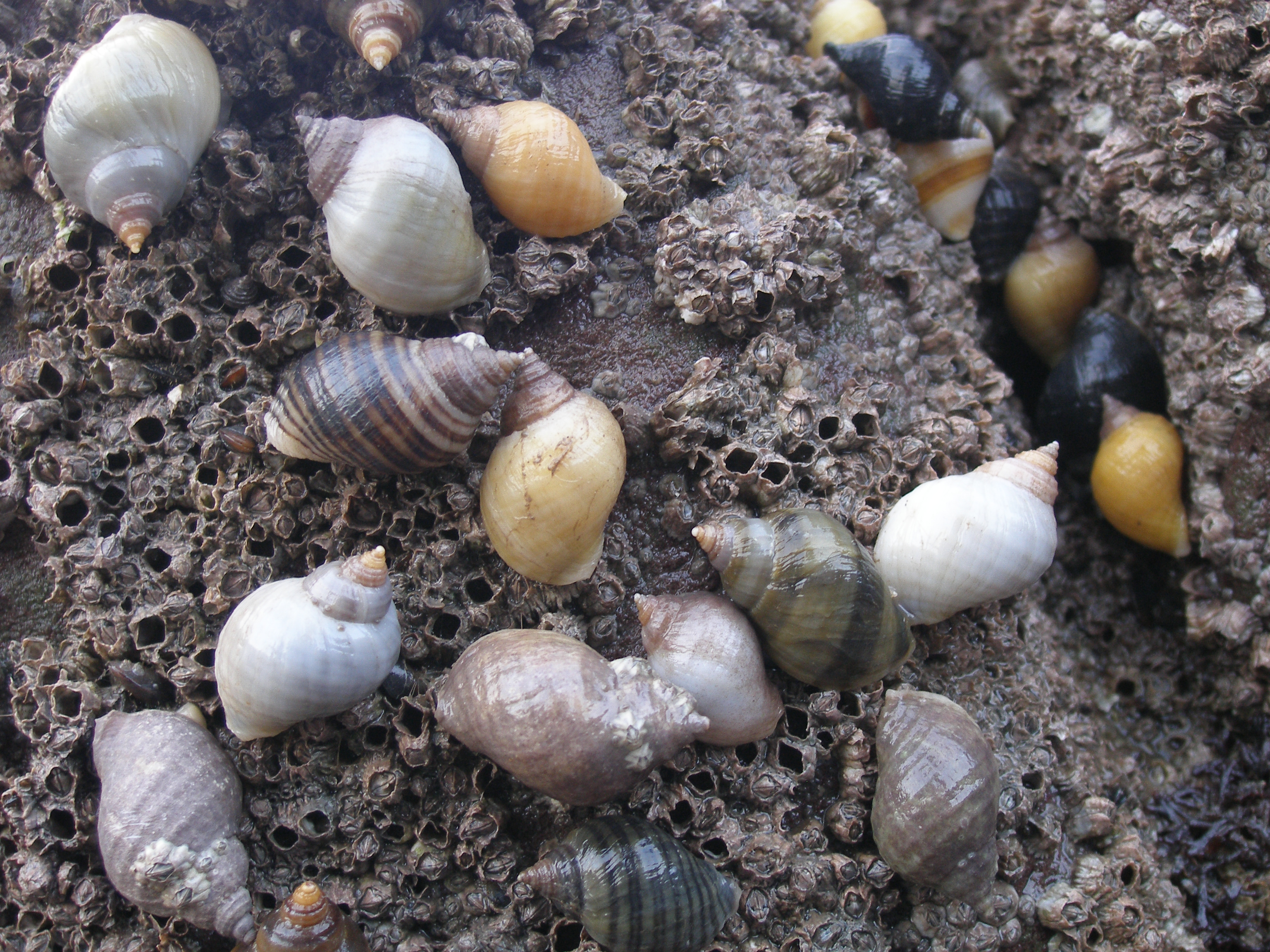
Nucella lapillus

The predatory intertidal snail Nucella lapillus also develops thicker shells in warmer climates, likely due to constraints on calcification in cold water. Bivalve clams show higher growth rates and produce thicker shells, more spines, and more shell ornamentation at warmer, low latitude locations, again highlighting the enhancement of calcification as a result of warmer water and the corresponding chemical changes.

The short-term changes in calcification rate and shell growth described by the aforementioned studies are based on experimental temperature elevation or latitudinal thermal gradients, but long-term temperature trends can also affect shell growth. Sclerochronology can reconstruct historical temperature data from growth increments in shells of many calcifying organisms based on differential growth rates at different temperatures. The visible markers for these growth increments are similar to growth rings, and are also present in fossil shells, enabling researchers to establish that clams such as Phacosoma balticum and Ruditapes philippinarum grew the fastest during times of warmer climate.

== Effect of salinity on calcification ==
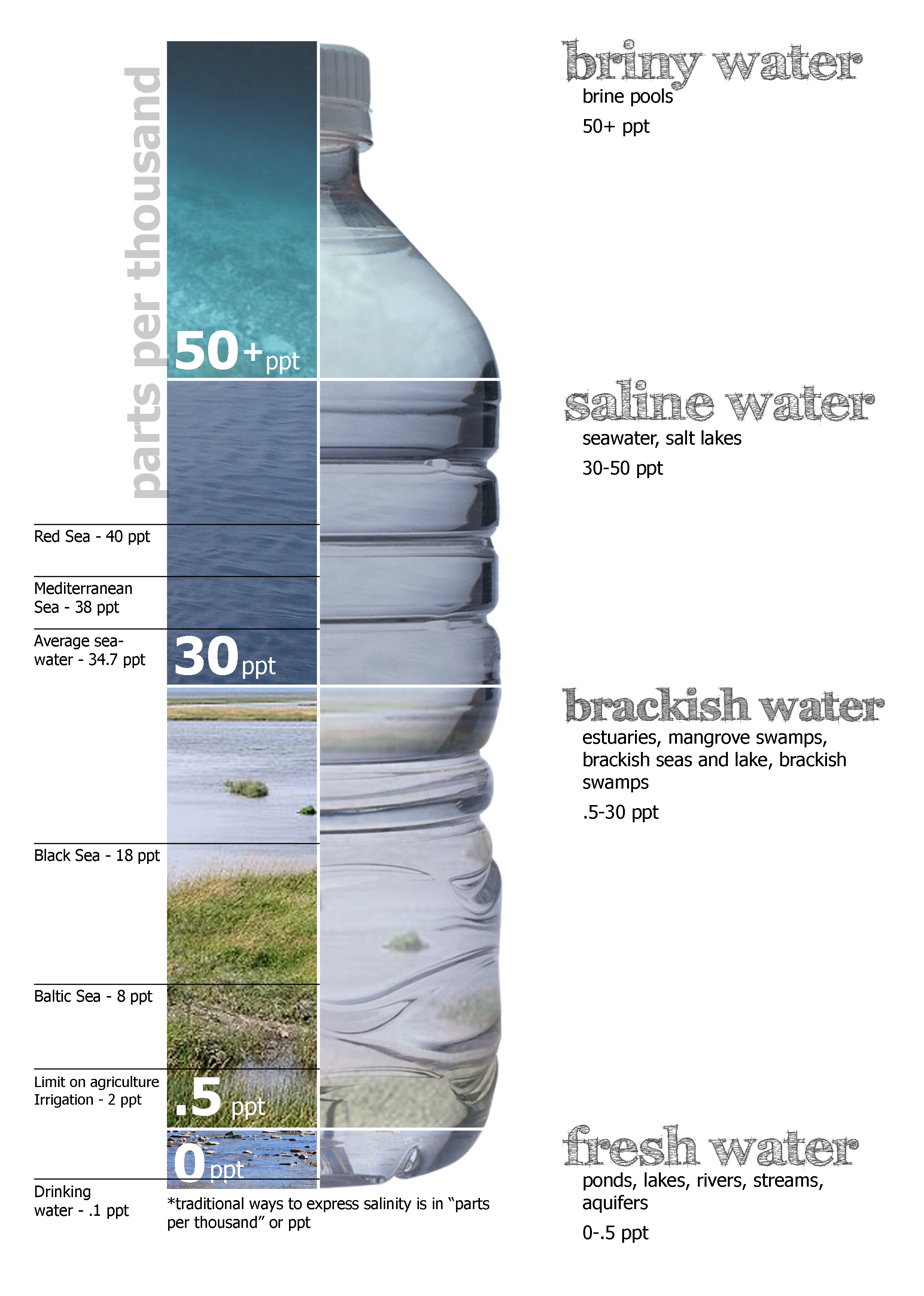
Terms for water with different salinities

Salinity refers to the water's "saltiness". In oceanography and marine biology, it has been traditional to express salinity not as a percent, but as permille (parts per thousand) (‰), which is approximately grams of salt per kilogram of solution. Salinity varies even more widely than temperature in estuaries, ranging from zero to 35, often over relatively short distances. Even organisms in the same location experience broad swings in salinity with the tides, exposing them to very different water masses with chemical properties that provide varying levels of support for calcification processes. Even within a single estuary, an individual species can be exposed to differing shell deposition conditions, resulting in varied growth patterns due to changes in water chemistry and resultant calcification rates.

=== Magnesium:calcium ratios ===
Salinity displays a positive correlation with magnesium:calcium (Mg:Ca) ratios, though shows only about half as much influence as temperature. Salinity in some systems can account for about 25% of the variation in Mg:Ca ratios, with 32% explained by temperature, but these salinity induced changes in shell MgCO_{3} incorporation are not due to differences in available magnesium. Instead, in planktonic foraminiferans, changes in salinity could hinder the internal mechanisms of magnesium removal prior to calcification. Foraminiferans are thought to produce calcification vacuoles that transport pockets of seawater to the calcification site and alter the makeup of the seawater and remove magnesium, a process that may be interrupted by high levels of salinity. Salinity can also affect the solubility of CaCO_{3}, as shown by the following formulas relating temperature T and salinity S to K’_{sp}, the apparent solubility product constant for CaCO_{3}.

K’_{sp}(calcite) = (0.1614 + 0.05225 S – 0.0063 T)×10^{−6}
K’_{sp}(aragonite) = (0.5115 + 0.05225 S – 0.0063 T)×10^{−6}

These equations show that temperature displays a negative relationship with K’_{sp}, while salinity shows a positive relationship with K’_{sp} (calcite and aragonite). The slopes of these lines are the same, with only the intercept changing for the different carbonate species, highlighting that at standard temperature and pressure, aragonite is more soluble than calcite. Mucci presented more complex equations relating temperature and salinity to K’_{sp}, but the same general pattern appears.

The increasing solubility of CaCO_{3} with salinity indicates that organisms in more marine environments would have difficulty depositing shell material if this factor was the only one influencing shell formation. Apparent solubility product is tied to salinity because of the ionic strength of the solution and the formation of cation-carbonate ion pairs that lower the amount of carbonate ions that are available in the water. This equates to the removal of the products from the equation for the dissolution of CaCO_{3} in water (CaCO_{3} ⇌ Ca^{2+} + CO^{2−}_{3}), which facilitates the forward reaction and favors the dissolution of calcium carbonate. This results in an apparent solubility product for CaCO_{3} that is 193 times higher in 35‰ seawater than in distilled water.

=== Saturation state ===
Salinity has a different effect on the saturation state of calcite and aragonite, causing increases in these values and in calcium concentrations with higher salinity, favoring the precipitation of calcium carbonate. Both alkalinity, or acid buffering capacity, and CaCO_{3} saturation state increase with salinity, which may help estuarine organisms to overcome fluctuations in pH that could otherwise negatively impact shell formation. However, river waters in some estuaries are oversaturated with calcium carbonate, while mixed estuarine water is undersaturated due to low pH resulting from respiration. Highly eutrophic estuaries support high amounts of planktonic and benthic animals that consume oxygen and produce carbon dioxide, which lowers the pH of estuarine waters and the amount of free carbonate. Therefore, even though higher salinity can cause increased saturation states of calcite and aragonite, there are many other factors that interact in this system to influence the shell deposition of estuarine organisms.

=== Shell deposition ===
All of these aspects of shell deposition are affected by salinity in different ways, so it is useful to examine the overall impact that salinity has on calcification rates and shell formation in estuarine organisms, especially in conjunction with temperature, which also affects calcification. Fish bones and scales are heavily calcified, and these parts of Arctic fish are about half as calcified (27% inorganic material) as those from fish in temperate (33%) and tropical (50%) environments. The benthic blue mussel Mytilus edulis also displayed an increase in calcification rate with salinity, showing calcification rates up to 5 times higher at 37‰ than 15‰.

For oysters in Chesapeake Bay, salinity does not have an influence on calcification at high temperature (30 °C), but does significantly increase calcification at cooler temperature (20 °C). In the crustose coralline algae Phymatolithon calcareum, temperature and salinity showed an additive effect, as both of these factors increased the overall calcification rate of this encrusting alga. The gross effect of salinity on calcification is largely a positive one, as evidenced by the positive impact of salinity on calcification rates in diverse groups of species. This is likely a result of the increased alkalinity and calcium carbonate saturation states with salinity, which combine to decrease free hydrogen ions and increase free carbonate ions in the water. Higher alkalinity in marine waters is especially important since carbon dioxide produced via respiration in estuaries can lower pH, which decreases saturation states of calcite and aragonite and can cause CaCO_{3} dissolution. Because of lower salinity in fresher parts of estuaries, alkalinity is lower, increasing the susceptibility of estuarine organisms to calcium carbonate dissolution due to low pH. Increases in salinity and temperature can counteract the negative impact of pH on calcification rates, as they elevate calcite and aragonite saturation states and generally facilitate more favorable conditions for shell growth.

== Future changes ==
Shell growth and calcification rate are the cumulative outcome of the impacts of temperature and salinity on water chemistry and organismal processes such as metabolism and respiration. It has been established that temperature and salinity influence the balance of the carbonate equilibrium, the solubility and saturation state of calcite and aragonite, as well as the amount of magnesium that gets incorporated into the mineral matrix of the shell. All of these factors combine to produce net calcification rates that are observed under different physical and environmental conditions. Organisms from many phyla produce calcium carbonate skeletons, so organismal processes vary widely, but the effect of physical conditions on water chemistry impacts all calcifying organisms. Since these conditions are dynamic in estuaries, they serve as an ideal test environment to draw conclusions about future shifts in calcification rates based on changes in water chemistry with climate change.

=== Climate change ===
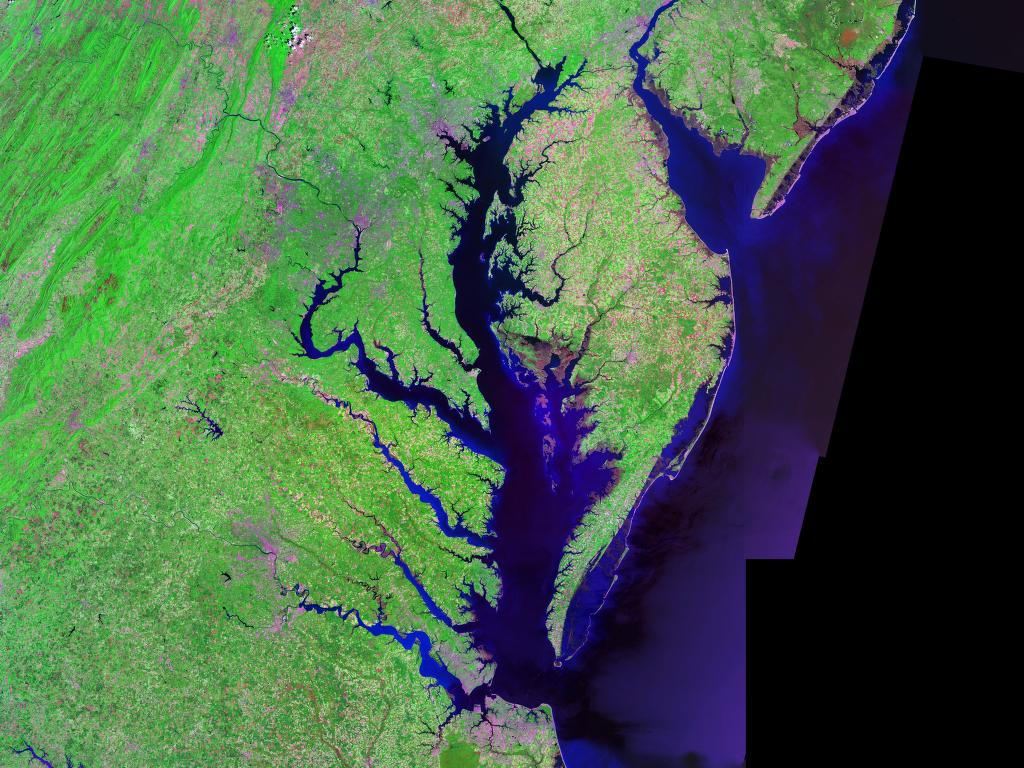
Satellite view of Chesapeake Bay (center) and Delaware Bay (top), on the east coast of the US

With changing climate, precipitation is predicted to increase in many areas, resulting in higher river discharge into estuarine environments. In large estuaries such as the Chesapeake Bay, this could result in a large-scale decrease in salinity over hundreds of square kilometers of habitats and cause a decrease in alkalinity and CaCO_{3} saturation states, reducing calcification rates in affected habitats. Lower alkalinity and increased nutrient availability from runoff will increase biological activity, producing carbon dioxide and thus lowering the pH of these environments. This could be exacerbated by pollution that could make estuarine environments even more eutrophic, negatively impacting shell growth since more acidic conditions favor shell dissolution. However, this may be mitigated by increased temperature due to global warming, since elevated temperature result in lower solubility and higher saturation states for calcite and aragonite, facilitating CaCO_{3} precipitation and shell formation. Therefore, if organisms are able to adapt or acclimate to increased temperature in terms of physiology, the higher temperature water will be more conducive to shell production than current water temperature, at least in temperate regions.

=== Calcification rates ===
The limiting factor in shell deposition may be saturation state, especially for aragonite, which is a more soluble and less stable form of CaCO_{3} than calcite. In 1998, the average global aragonite saturation state was 390%, a range commonly experienced since the last glacial period and a percentage above which calcification rates plateaued. However, there is a precipitous drop in calcification rate with aragonite saturation state dropping below 380%, with a three-fold decrease in calcification accompanying a drop to 98% saturation. By 2100, pCO_{2} of 560 and pH drop to 7.93 (global ocean average) will reduce the saturation state to 293%, which is unlikely to cause calcification decreases. The following 100–200 years may see pCO_{2} increase to 1000, pH drop to 7.71, and aragonite saturation state drop to 192, which would result in a 14% drop in calcification rate based on this alone. This could be exacerbated by low salinity from higher precipitation in estuaries, but could also be mitigated by increased temperature which could increase calcification rates. The interaction between pH, temperature and salinity in estuaries and in the world ocean will drive calcification rates and determine future species assemblages based on susceptibility to this change.

One problem with counting on increased temperature to counteract effects of acidification on calcification rate is the relationship between temperature and Mg:Ca ratios, as higher temperature result in higher amounts of magnesium incorporated into the shell matrix. Shells with higher Mg:Ca ratios are more soluble, so even organisms with primarily calcite (less soluble than aragonite) skeletons may be heavily impacted by future conditions.

== See also ==
- Bivalve shell
- Carapace
- Exoskeleton
- Gastropod shell
- Marine biogenic calcification
- Mineralized tissues
- Mollusc shell
- Seashell
- Test (biology)
