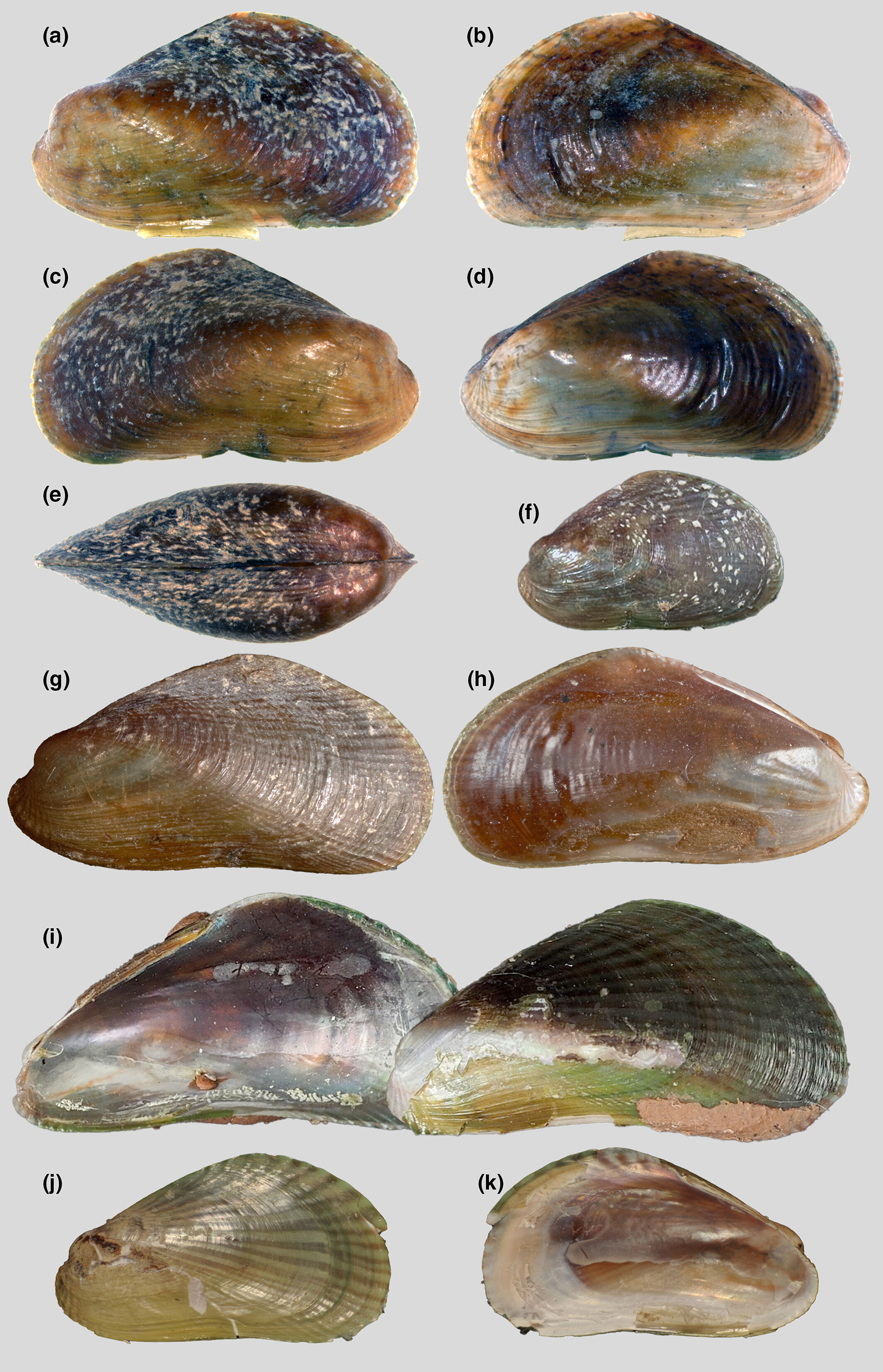

Scientific classification
- Kingdom: Animalia
- Phylum: Mollusca
- Class: Bivalvia
- Order: Mytilida
- Family: Mytilidae
- Genus: Parabrachidontes
- Species: P. leucostictus

Binomial name
- Parabrachidontes leucostictus (von Martens, 1897)

Synonyms
- Modiola leucosticta von Martens, 1897; Arcuatula leucosticta (von Martens, 1897); Modiola evansi E. A. Smith, 1903; Brachidontes evansi (E. A. Smith, 1903)

= Parabrachidontes leucostictus =

Species of bivalve

Parabrachidontes leucostictus is a species of bivalve in the family Mytilidae. The species was first scientifically described in 1897 by Carl Eduard von Martens as Modiola leucosticta. This freshwater species is known from southern Thailand, Borneo (East Malaysia), and Sulawesi (Indonesia). It has been collected in both lakes and rivers and can also occur in weakly brackish water (salinity <3 ‰).

The shell is thin, elongate, and mytiliform, and can reach 30 mm (1.2 in) in length.
