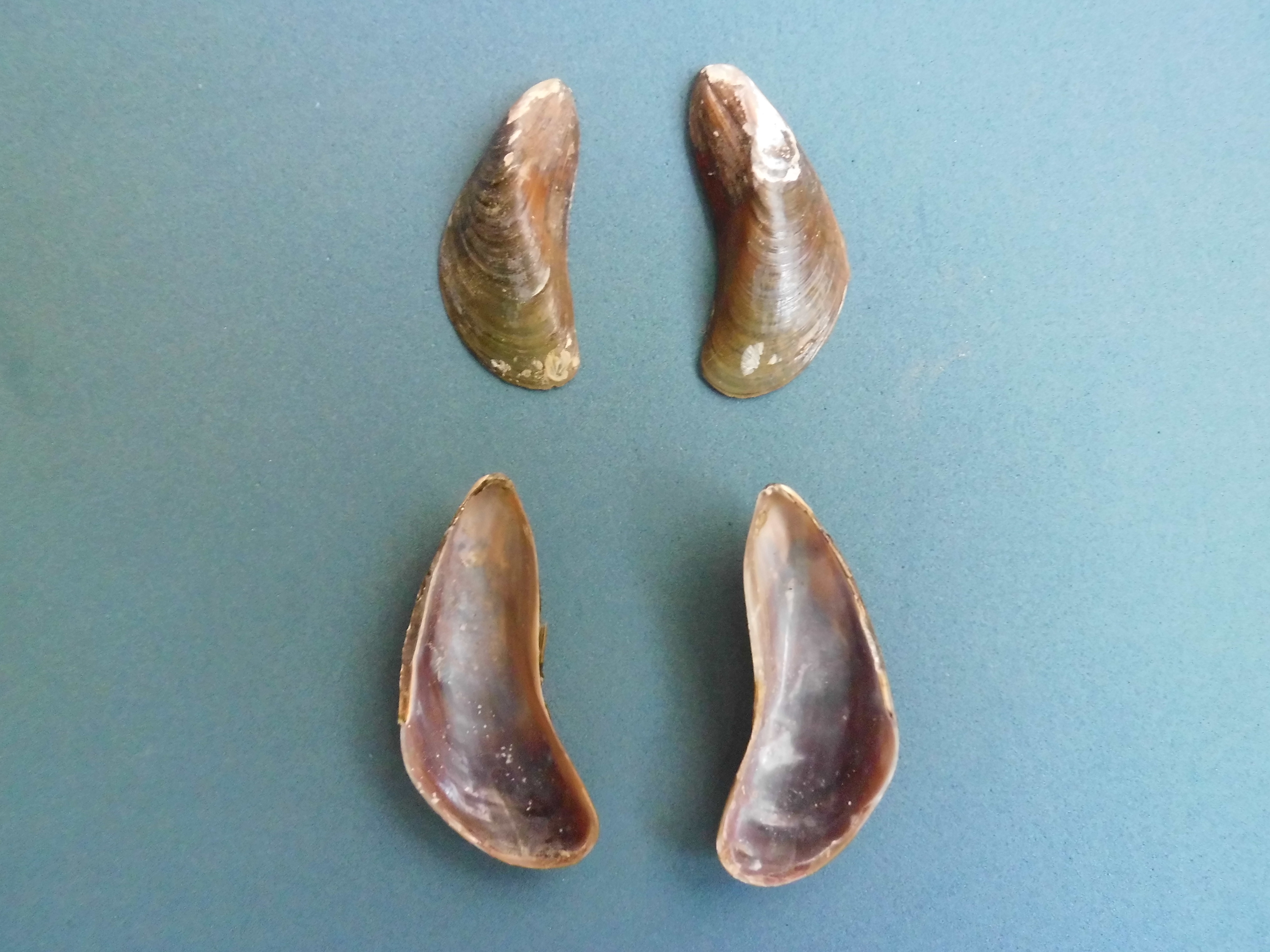
- Mytella strigata

Scientific classification
- Kingdom: Animalia
- Phylum: Mollusca
- Class: Bivalvia
- Order: Mytilida
- Family: Mytilidae
- Genus: Mytella
- Species: M. strigata

Binomial name
- Mytella strigata (Hanley, 1843)

Synonyms
- Synonymy: Modiola strigata Hanley, 1843; Modiolus arciformis Dall, 1909; Mytella charruana d'Orbigny, 1846; Mytella falcata d'Orbigny, 1846; Mytella maracaibensis Beauperthuy, 1967; Mytilus charruanus d'Orbigny, 1846; Mytilus falcatus d'Orbigny, 1846; Mytilus mundahuensis Duarte, 1926; Mytilus sinuatus Reeve, 1857; Mytilus strigatus Hanley, 1843; Volsella reevei Angas, 1867

= Mytella strigata =

Species of bivalve

Mytella strigata is a bivalve, commonly known as the charru mussel or charrua mussel. This species was described by Sylvanus Charles Thorp Hanley based on a specimen from the Philippines. It was found in Central and South America and by Alcide d'Orbigny, a French naturalist, in 1842, where it was assigned the synonym Mytilus charruanus. They are less than an inch long (2.5 cm), and range from brown to black in color.

== Habitat ==
The charru mussel is native to Panama, Argentina, Brazil and Venezuela, but is invasive to Southeastern U.S., the Philippines, Singapore, Thailand, and India. Specifically, the indigenous range of the mytilid Mytella strigata extends along the Eastern coast of South America from Venezuela to Argentina and in the Pacific from Sonora, Mexico to El Salvador. It is also said that they are native to the Galapagos Islands, the Pacific coast from Mexico to Ecuador and, again, the Atlantic coast from Argentina to Venezuela.

=== Climate tolerance ===
Mytella strigata can survive best in temperatures from 20°C - 23°C with a survival rate of 83-88%, but have been found in temperatures between 13°C-36°C. Higher temperatures around 28°C - 36°C have about a 0-24% survival rate. Any temperature at or higher than 36°C has a survival rate of 0%. There is low 38% survival rate in cold temperatures at 13°C.

=== Salinity tolerance ===
Mytella strigata can survive at salinities as low as 2 ppt (parts per thousand) and as high as 22.5 ppt. They can also survive large fluctuations in salinity for long and short periods of time.

== Morphology ==
Mytella strigata contain byssal threads, these rope-like structures are made from collagen and act like tethers. Byssal threads can reach approximately 160% of a mussels length. These threads help mussels adhere to solid surfaces. Like other bivalves, M. strigata has a protective shell made from calcium. Two interior adductor muscles are used to open and close the shell.

== Life cycle ==
Mytella strigata has a spawning period between July and October. Embryos develop into free-swimming larvae, then mature into a bivalve veliger that resembles a small clam. The veliger matures, and under certain conditions may experience sexual reversal. Insemination and fertilization has not been observed in M. strigata.

== Ecology ==
Mytella strigata is an epifaunal tropical and subtropical mussel colonizing rocky substrates in estuaries primarily along the Atlantic and Caribbean coasts of South America.

=== Feeding ===
Mytella strigata feed on phytoplankton and deleterious materials which are macronutrients.

== As an invasive species ==
=== History ===
Since the charru mussel is Native in warmer climates, such as Central and South America, the species has invaded other close by warm waters. M. strigata populations moved to southeastern United States, specifically Florida and Georgia and has since been found at these areas. The population density is much lower than that of their native habitats where M. strigata densities can reach to more than 11,036 mussels m^{−2}. In 2014-2015, M. strigata has been reported to have invaded the Philippines, specifically in Manila South Harbor, Manila Bay, Luzon Island. Subsequently, these mussels have appeared in Singapore in 2016, in Thailand in 2018, and in India in 2019.

=== Dispersal vectors ===
Charru mussels have great dispersal ability and appear to readily colonize a variety of habitats. This ability facilitated this mussel in becoming an important invasive species in several regions of the world.
