= Marine biogenic calcification =

Shell formation mechanism

Marine biogenic calcification is the process by which marine organisms such as oysters and clams form calcium carbonate. Seawater is full of dissolved compounds, ions and nutrients that organisms can use for energy and, in the case of calcification, to build shells and outer structures. Calcifying organisms in the ocean include molluscs, foraminifera, coccolithophores, crustaceans, echinoderms such as sea urchins, and corals. The shells and skeletons produced from calcification have important functions for the physiology and ecology of the organisms that create them.

== Chemical process ==
The ocean is the largest sink or reservoir of atmospheric carbon dioxide (CO_{2}), continually taking in carbon from the air. This dissolved CO_{2} initially reacts with water to form carbonic acid, before reacting further to generate carbonate (CO_{3}^{2−}), bicarbonate (HCO_{3}^{−}), and hydrogen (H^{+}) ions. Not only does this sequence of reactions regulate oceanic pH levels, it also determines the saturation state of seawater - how saturated (or unsaturated) the seawater is with said ions. This has a proportionate effect on the net calcification of marine calcifiers - dissolution versus calcification.

The saturation state for calcium carbonate (CaCO_{3}) can be determined using the equation:

Ω = ([Ca^{2+}][CO_{3}^{2−}])/ K_{sp}

Where the numerator denotes the concentrations of calcium ions to carbonate ions, and the denominator K_{sp} refers to the stoichiometric solubility product for the mineral (solid) phase of calcium carbonate. When the saturation state is high, organisms can extract the calcium and carbonate ions from the seawater and form solid crystals of calcium carbonate.

Ca^{2+}_{(aq)} + 2HCO_{3}^{−}_{(aq)} → CaCO_{3(s)} + CO_{2} + H_{2}O

The three most common calcium carbonate minerals are aragonite, calcite, and vaterite. Though these minerals have the same chemical formula (CaCO_{3}), they are considered polymorphs because the atoms making up the molecules are stacked in different configurations. For example, aragonite minerals have an orthorhombic crystal lattice structure while calcite crystals have a trigonal structure.

Amongst calcite polymorphs, there are even further subdivisions delineated by relative Magnesium content (Mg/Ca ratio), where the solubility of calcite increases with its Mg-content.

There are two main types of biogenic calcification in marine organisms. The extracellular biologically induced mineralization involves deposition of calcium carbonate on the exterior of the organism. In contrast, during intracellular mineralization the calcium carbonate is formed within the organism and can either be kept within the organism in a sort of skeleton or internal structure or is later moved to the outside of the organism but retains the cell membrane covering.

Molluscs and corals use the extracellular strategy, which is a basic form of calcification where ions are actively pumped out of a cell or are pumped into a vesicle within a cell and then the vesicle containing the calcium carbonate is secreted to the outside of the organism. However, there are obstacles to overcome. The saturation state must be high enough for calcification, and the organism must control the hydrogen ion concentration in the surrounding area. Hydrogen interferes with shell formation because it can bond with carbonate ions. This would reduce the amount of carbonate available to the organism for shell building. To counteract this effect, the organism can pump hydrogen out, thereby increasing the amount of free carbonate ions for calcification.

== Marine calcifying organisms ==
=== Corals ===
Corals are an obvious group of calcifying organisms, a group that easily comes to mind when one thinks of tropical oceans, scuba diving, and of course the Great Barrier Reef off the coast of Australia. However, this group only accounts for about 10% of the global production of calcium carbonate. Corals undergo extracellular calcification and first develop an organic matrix and skeleton on top of which they will form their calcite structures. Coral reefs uptake calcium and carbonate from the water to form calcium carbonate via the following chemical reaction:

CO_{3}^{2-} + Ca^{2+} → CaCO_{3}

It is proposed that calcification via pH upregulation of the coral’s extracellular calcifying fluid occurs at least in part via Ca^{2+}-ATPase. Ca^{2+}-ATPase is an enzyme in the calicoblastic epithelium that pumps Ca^{2+} ions into the calcifying region and ejects protons (H^{+}). This process circumvents the kinetic barriers to CaCO_{3} precipitation that exist naturally in seawater.

Dissolved inorganic carbon (DIC) from the seawater is absorbed and transferred to the coral skeleton. An anion exchanger will then be used to secrete DIC at the site of calcification. This DIC pool is also used by algal symbionts (dinoflagellates) that live in the coral tissue. These algae photosynthesize and produce nutrients, some of which are passed to the coral. The coral in turn will emit ammonium waste products which the algae uptake as nutrients. There has been an observed tenfold increase in calcium carbonate formation in corals containing algal symbionts than in corals that do not have this symbiotic relationship.

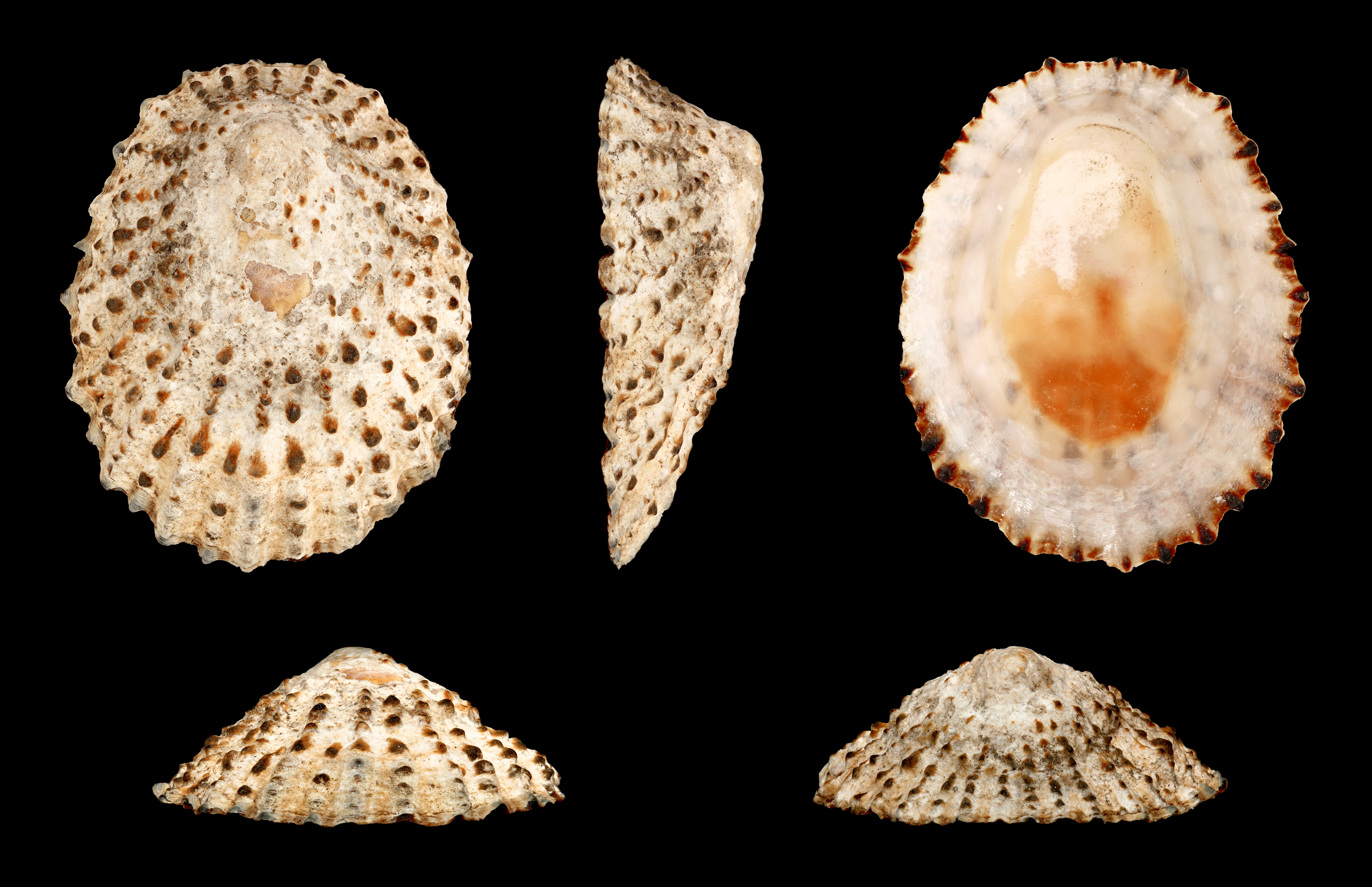
The shell of a Patella piperatamollusc seen from the dorsal, lateral (left side), ventral, back, and front views.

=== Molluscs ===
As mentioned above, the molluscs are a well-known group of calcifying organisms. This diverse group contains the slugs, cuttlefish, oysters, limpets, snails, scallops, mussels, clams, octopuses, squid, and others. In order for organisms such as oysters and mussels to form calcified shells, they must uptake carbonate and calcium ions into calcifying areas next to their shells. Here they reinforce the protein casing of their shell with calcium carbonate. These organisms also pump hydrogen out so that it will not bond to the carbonate ions and make them unable to crystallize as calcium carbonate.

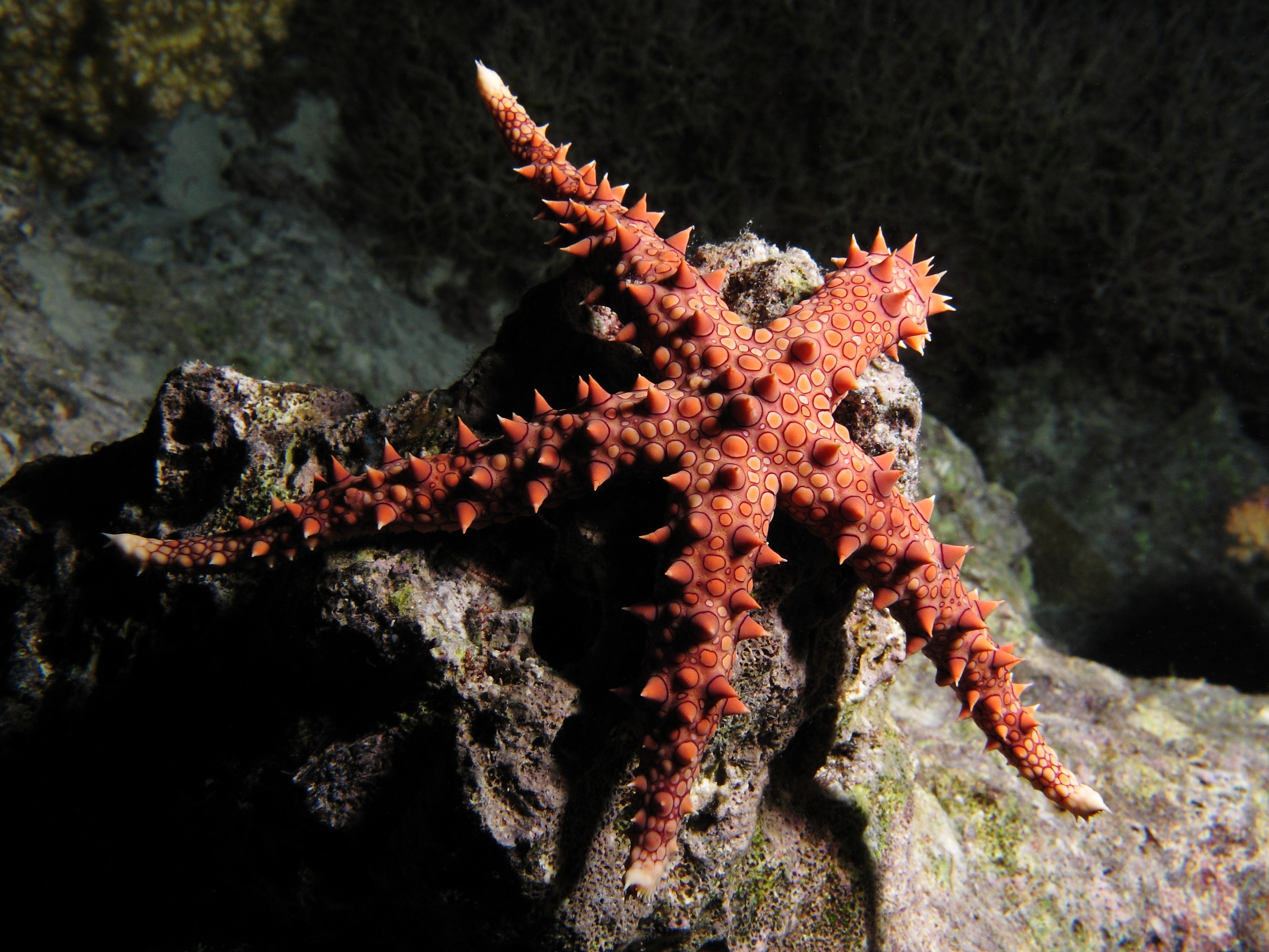
An Egyptian sea star, a common example of an Echinoderm.

=== Echinoderms ===
Echinoderms, of the phylum Echinodermata, include sea creatures such as sea stars, sea urchins, sand dollars, crinoids, sea cucumbers and brittle stars. This group of organisms is known for their radial symmetry and they mostly use the intracellular calcifying strategy, keeping their calcified structures inside their bodies. They form large vesicles from the fusing of their cell membranes and inside these vesicles is where the calcified crystals are formed. The mineral is only exposed to the environment once those cell membranes are degraded, and therefore serve as a sort of skeleton.

The echinoderm skeleton is an endoskeleton that is enclosed by the epidermis. These structures are made of interlocking calcium carbonate plates, which can either fit tightly together, as in the case of sea urchins, or can be loosely bound, such as in the case of starfish. The epidermis or skin covering the calcium carbonate plates are able to uptake and secrete nutrients in order to support and maintain the skeleton. The epidermis usually also contains pigment cells to give the organism color, can detect motion of small creatures on the animal’s surface, and also generally contain gland cells to secrete fluids or toxins. These calcium carbonate plates and skeletons provide the organism structure, support, and protection.

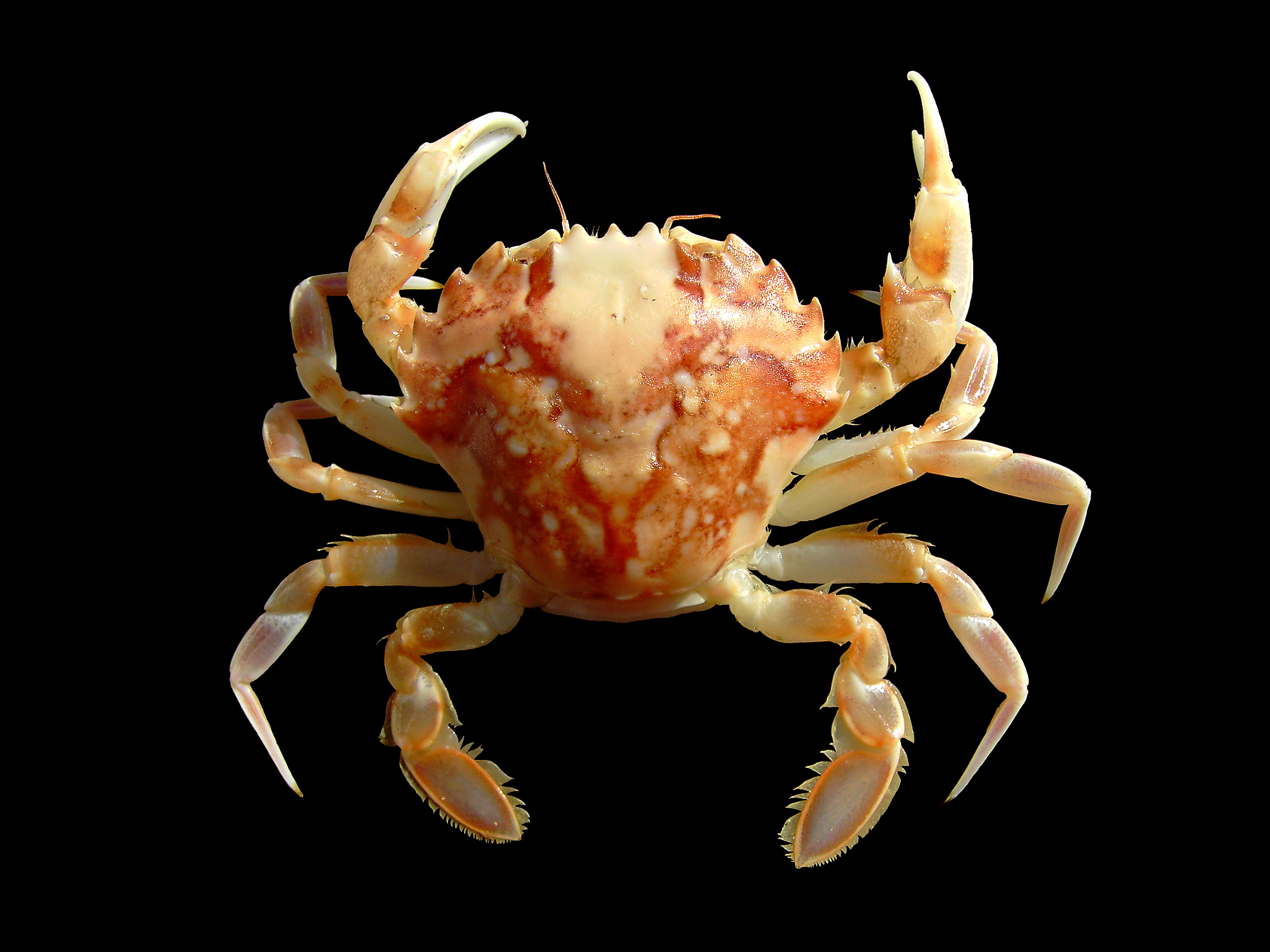
A marbled swimming crab.

=== Crustaceans ===
Crustaceans have a hard outer shell. A crustacean will form a network of chitin-protein fibers and then will precipitate calcium carbonate within this matrix of fibers. These chitin-protein fibers are first hardened by sclerotization, or crosslinking of protein and polysaccharides and of proteins with other proteins before the calcification process begins. The calcium carbonate component makes up between 20 and 50% of the shell. The presence of a hard, calcified exoskeleton means that the crustacean has to molt and shed the exoskeleton as its body size increases. This links the calcification process to the molting cycles, making a regular source of calcium and carbonate ions crucial. The crustacean is the only phylum of animals that can resorb calcified structures, and will reabsorb minerals from the old shell and incorporate them into the new shell. Various body parts of the crustacean will have a different mineral content, varying the hardness at these locations with the harder areas being generally stronger. This calcite shell provides protection for the crustaceans, and between the molting cycles the crustacean must avoid predators while it waits for the calcite shell to form and harden.

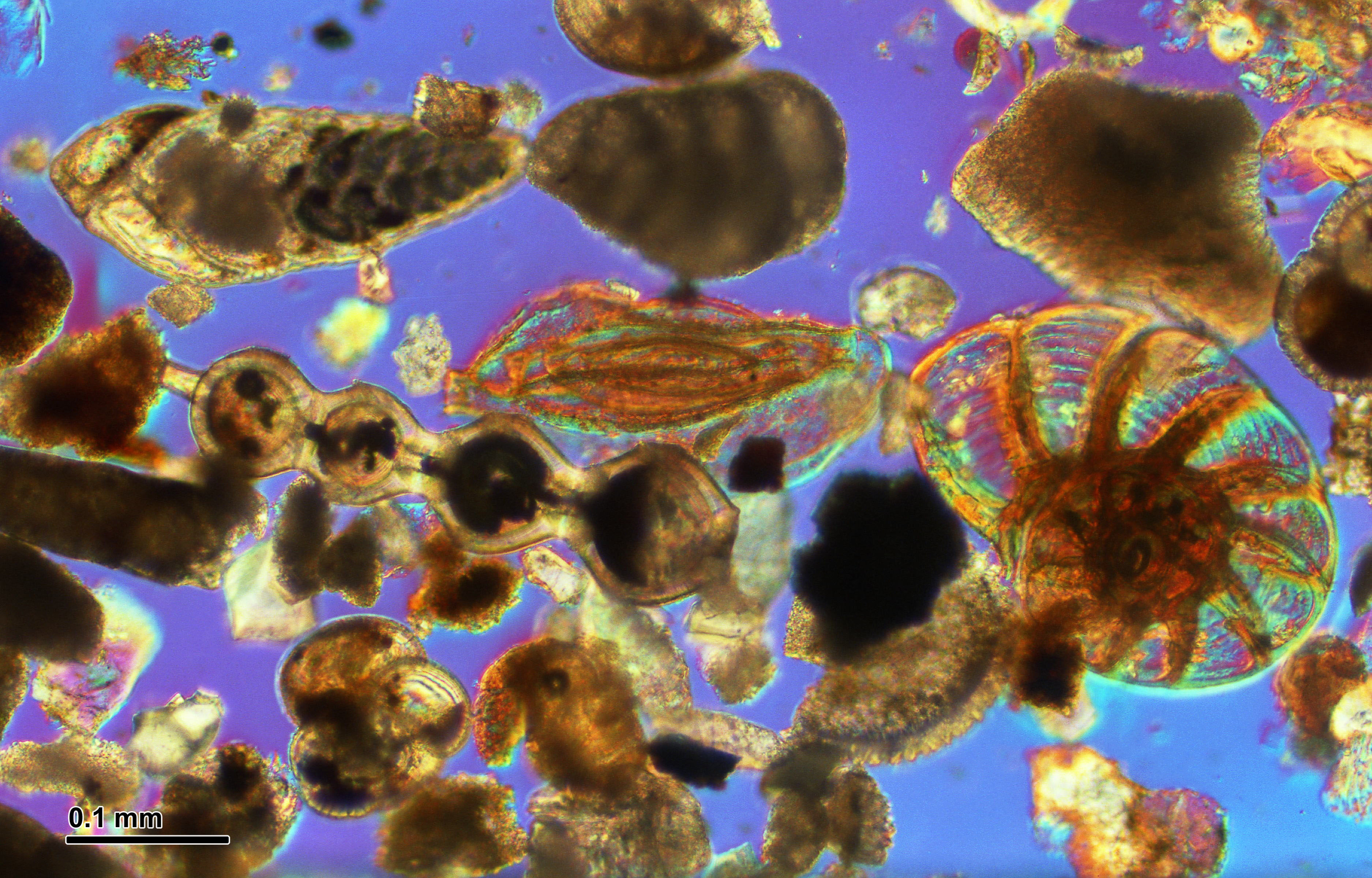
Various types of foraminifera observed through a microscope using differential interference contrast.

=== Foraminifera ===
Foraminifera, or forams, are single-celled protists with shells, or tests made of calcium carbonate shells to protect themselves. These organisms are one of the most abundant groups of shelled organisms, but are very small, usually between 0.05 and 0.5mm in diameter. However their shells are divided into chambers that accumulate during growth, in some cases allowing these single-celled organisms to become almost 20 centimeters in length. Foraminiferal classification is dependent on the characteristics of the shell, such as chamber shape and arrangement, surface ornamentation, wall composition, and other features.

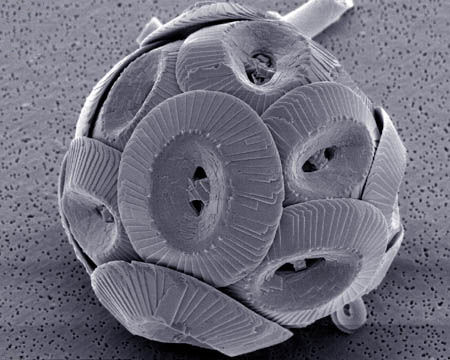
Coccolithus pelagicus, a species of coccolithophore sampled from the North Atlantic Ocean.

=== Coccolithophores ===
Phytoplankton, such as coccolithophores, are also well known for their calcium carbonate production. It is estimated that these phytoplankton may contribute up to 70% to the global calcium carbonate precipitation, and coccolithophores are the largest phytoplankton contributors. Contributing between 1 and 10% of total primary productivity, 200 species of coccolithophores live in the ocean, and under the right conditions they can form large blooms in subpolar regions. These large bloom formations are a driving force for the export of calcium carbonate from the surface to the deep ocean in what is sometimes called “Coccolith rain”. As the coccolithophores sink to the seafloor they contribute to the vertical carbon dioxide gradient in the water column.

Coccolithophores produce calcite plates termed coccoliths which together cover the entire cell surface forming the coccosphere. The coccoliths are formed using the intracellular strategy where the plates are formed in a coccoliths vesicle, but the product forming within the vesicle varies between the haploid and diploid phases. A coccolithophore in the haploid phase will produce what is called a holococcolith, while one in the diploid phase will produce heterococcoliths. Holococcoliths are small calcite crystals held together in an organic matrix, while heterococcoliths are arrays are larger, more complex calcite crystals. These are often formed over a pre-existing template, giving each plate its particular structure and forming complex designs. Each coccolithophore is a cell surrounded by the exoskeleton coccosphere, but there exists a wide range of sizes, shapes and architectures between different cells. Advantages of these plates may include protection against infection by viruses and bacteria, as well as protection from grazing zooplankton. The calcium carbonate exoskeleton enhances the amount of light the coccolithophore can uptake, increasing the level of photosynthesis. Finally, the coccoliths protect the phytoplankton from photodamage by UV light from the sun.

The coccolithophores are also important in the geological history of Earth. The oldest coccolithophore fossil records are more than 209 million years old, placing their earliest presence in the Late Triassic period. Their calcium carbonate formation may have been the first deposition of carbonate on the seafloor.

== Responses to ocean acidification ==
Contrary to popular belief, the negative responses of marine calcifiers to ocean acidification are not absolute. A 2009 study by researchers at Woods Hole Oceanographic Institution elucidated not only acidification's potentially neutered or even positive effects on species like crab and shrimp, but also the mechanisms that facilitated their unexpected responses. Accompanying investigations have further shown that such responses only pertain to the short-term, with the gradual onset of biochemical fatigue and associated "muscle wastage" giving rise to long-term complications.

== See also ==
- Ocean acidification - a threat for marine biogenic calcification
- Protist shell
- Seashell
- Shell growth in estuaries
