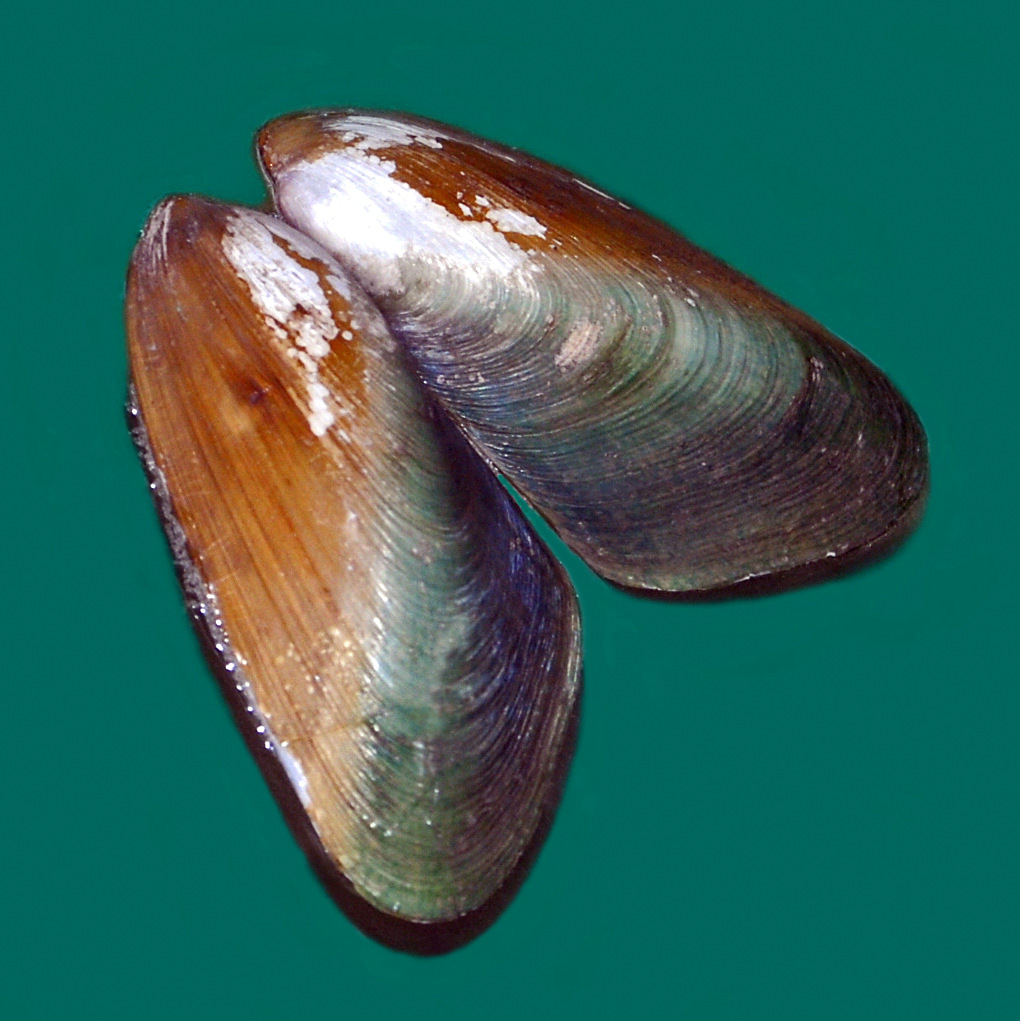
- Mytella guyanensis

Scientific classification
- Domain: Eukaryota
- Kingdom: Animalia
- Phylum: Mollusca
- Class: Bivalvia
- Order: Mytilida
- Superfamily: Mytiloidea
- Family: Mytilidae
- Genus: Mytella; Soot-Ryen, 1955

Type species
- Modiola guyanensis Lamarck, 1819

= Mytella =

Genus of bivalves

Mytella is a genus of saltwater clams, marine bivalve molluscs in the subfamily Arcuatulinae of the family Mytilidae, the mussels.

== Species ==
- Mytella brasiliensis (Gray, 1825)
- Mytella guyanensis J.B.P.A. Lamarck, 1819
- Mytella speciosa (Reeve, 1857)
- Mytella strigata (Hanley, 1843)
- Mytella tumbezensis (Pilsbry & Olsson, 1935)

Synonyms

- Mytella bicolor (Bruguière, 1792): synonym of Mytella guyanensis (Lamarck, 1819)
- Mytella charruana (d'Orbigny, 1846): synonym of Mytella strigata (Hanley, 1843)
- Mytella falcata (d'Orbigny, 1846): synonym of Mytella strigata (Hanley, 1843)
- Mytella maracaibensis Beauperthuy, 1967: synonym of Mytella strigata (Hanley, 1843)
