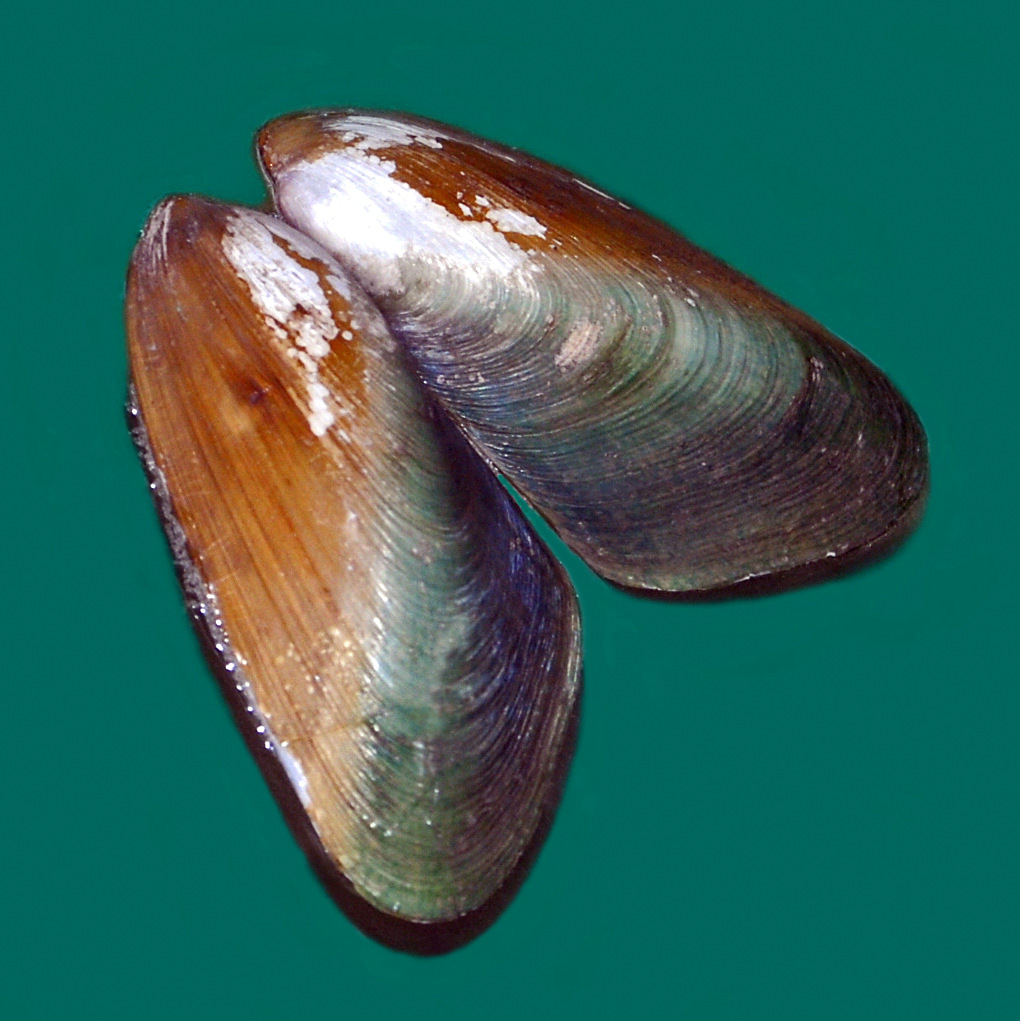
- Two shells of Mytella guyanensis

Scientific classification
- Kingdom: Animalia
- Phylum: Mollusca
- Class: Bivalvia
- Order: Mytilida
- Family: Mytilidae
- Genus: Mytella
- Species: M. guyanensis

Binomial name
- Mytella guyanensis J.B.P.A. Lamarck

Synonyms
- Modiolus bicolor J.B.P.A. Lamarck, 1819; Mytella bicolor J.G. Bruguière, 1792; Modiola bicolor J.B.P.A. Lamarck, 1819; Modiolus brasiliensis S.C.T. Hanley, 1843; Mytella brasiliensis J.E. Gray, 1825; Modiola brasiliensis J.E. Gray, 1825; Modiola brasiliensis mutabilis P.P. Carpenter, 1857; Mytella guyanaensis J.B.P.A. Lamarck, 1819; Modiola semifusca G.B. I Sowerby, 1825; Modiolus sinuosa King, 1832; Modiola sinuosa P.P. King & W.J. Broderip, 1832; Modiola subfuscata S. Clessin, 1887; Mytilus umbonata H.E. Anton, 1838; Mytella umbonata H.E. Anton, 1838

= Mytella guyanensis =

Species of bivalve

Mytella guyanensis is a species of tropical saltwater mussel, marine bivalve molluscs in the family Mytilidae. This species has been referred to colloquially as the “Trinidad Swamp Mussel” —although not formally confirmed as the common name. It was first described in detail by the French naturalist Jean Baptiste Lamarck in 1819.

== Description ==
The size of this mussel may vary depending on where an individual organism is found. Originally, sources indicated that shells of this species can reach a length of 50–60 millimetres (2.0–2.4 in). It has since been observed that matured M. guyanensis specimen have been recorded with lengths as small as 18 millimeters (mm), and their maximum lengths can range from 65 - 86.2 mm (Brazil) or 67.8 – 84.3 mm (Costa Rica and Trinidad). The average growth rate of an individual within this species has been observed to be 3.76 to 6.23 mm per month within the first year when growing in the wild, but when cultured can reach an average growth rate of 5.77 mm per month. There has been no significant difference recorded between the size of males or females of M. guyanensis.

Shell coloration of this species is consistent between males and females, which both present as dark brown. It has been observed that distinct color patterns can be present in individuals that are shorter than 40mm. The shape of the shells of this organism are widest in the central axis between the dorsal and ventral sides. Shell texture is typically smooth, although older organisms can develop rough shells due to erosive interactions with the substrates found in their environment.

== Distribution ==
Lamarck initially observed M. guyanensis in the western region of Trinidad in an area known as the Caroni Swamp, which is a wetland habitat along the Caroni River. This initial record of the species gave rise to the name “Trinidad Swamp Mussel”, although since its discovery in other regions, the name became far less common. This saltwater mussel species has been found residing along the coastline from Baja California to Peru. Additionally, this species has been found thriving along the coastlines of Venezuela and Brazil. This species is thought to be present in Mexico, Brasil, Costa Rica, El Salvador, Australia, Tasmania, Macquarie Island, Jamaica, Panama, Peru and South Carolina. Little is currently known about the population density of this organism, but early estimates range from 1 to 200 mussels per meter squared.

The typical sediment characteristics of the habitat in which M. guyanensis include firm, muddy sediment commonly associated with the roots of the Black Mangrove (Avicennia germinans), although this species has been observed to exist with regions of coarser substrates. Sediment type is a distinguishing feature of the habitat for this species considering its burying behavior. M. guyanensis has been found to bury themselves in a vertical position with a portion of their shell protruding from the sediment. A relative of this species, Mytella falcata, is commonly found near populations of M. guyanensis, although M. falcata typically utilizes roots of mangroves to anchor to. One notable characteristic about this species of mussel is that the byssal threads produced will form a dense nest formation, which attaches the organism to the substrate.

As evidenced by many marine organisms, M. guyanensis thrives within a specific range of temperature and salinity. M. guyanensis resides half-buried within sediments, and those sediments act as an insulator to temperature. This mussel species is often shaded by the canopy of mangrove trees as well, which further reduces this mussel species’ exposure to temperature changes at low tide due to air exposure. When comparing the ability to withstand certain temperatures, M. guyanensis has a smaller ideal temperature niche than its counterpart, M. falcata. It has been determined that M. guyanensis has an ideal seawater temperature at 24 degrees Celsius, but may withstand temperatures reaching 30 degrees Celsius. Beyond these seawater temperatures, these mussels will begin to experience mortality and a decrease in byssus thread production. M. guyanensis has a far greater range of tolerable salinities.

== Ecological relevance ==
Mussels provide a wide variety of benefits to the ecosystems in which they reside, and among those benefits is the filtration of water due to their nature as filter feeders. Mussels will slightly open their shells, filter water through their gills, and process the water to filter out the microplankton species from the water. Given its habitat, M. guyanensis is exposed to predators including whelks (Melongena melongena), and the Great Hairy Melongena (Pugilina morio), which is a species of sea snail. Additionally, crabs including Goniopsis cruentata and Eurytium limosum prey on M. guyanensis. Swamp birds, including herons, sandpipers, and rails, have also been known to prey on mussels when exposed by low tide.

Beyond the predator/prey relationships of M. guyanensis, this species of mussel is plagued by a parasite that is only found interacting with only these genera of mussel. Nematopsis mytella n. spp. is a parasite that infects the gill epithelium of the mussel, although there is currently little known about the impacts that this parasite has on this species. In addition to this parasitic relationship, these mussels are known to have commensalistic relationships with some species commonly encountered within its habitat. Due to its burrowing habit as described in 1975 by Bacon, there are very few—if any—organisms that attach themselves to the hardened shells of M. guyanensis. However, this species is known to be associated with Black Mangroves (A. germinans) and White Mangroves (Laguncularia racemosa). These mangrove species offer shade and protection for these mussels as well as providing structure to the surrounding habitat. Although M. guyanensis rely on their own production of byssus nests for stability, these mangrove species provide supplementary consistency for mussels and the other species within their habitats.

=== Role as a bioindicator ===
Like many marine organisms, mussels respond to changes in their environments. These organisms can indicate whether or not a habitat and the organisms that reside there are imperiled due to climate change or anthropogenic activity. Trinidad and Tobago, a country with large populations of M. guyanensis, is one of the world's leading exporters of ammonia and methanol. This process is taxing on the environment, and metal contamination can be detrimental to local marine environments. However, examining the tissues of local mussel species can indicate the presence of anthropogenic pollution as mussels are filter feeders. There are many characteristics of mussels that make these organisms an excellent indicator of environmental stability, some of which include their bioaccumulation capabilities, geographic distribution, global abundance, and their sessile nature. Within a laboratory environment, chemical biomarkers of M. guyanensis have been examined; and this examination indicated that the individuals were under oxidative stress promoted by pollution within the region. Another study indicated that M. guyanensis would be an ideal indicator organism for heavy metal and organic pollution presence. When considering environmental temperature, another study indicated that when mussels undergo physiological stressor due to temperature, their byssal thread production heavily decreases. This could become an indicator of ecosystem health.

=== Economic value ===
There is a demand for mussels in markets as a consumer good. Marketable size of M. guyanensis for human consumption is roughly 40 mm in length, and it is at this length that this species of mussels enters into a baseline marketable value. Currently, estimates indicate that around 60% of net production of wild bivalves found along the coast of Brazil are a vital natural resource for those in the area. Some coastal communities are already utilizing mussels within the Mytella genus as a key component of their diets. It has been noted that M. guyanensis is a target for aquacultural development, and this species has already been successfully cultivated on floating substrates in Costa Rica. Experiments with a closely related counterpart of M. guyanensis, M. falcata, indicate that market size can be obtained with roughly 4–5 months of growth, and it would be expected that M. guyanensis would have a similar timeline.

== Reproductive characteristics ==
M. guyanensis are dioecious, meaning that reproductive organisms of males and females are separated by sexes, and no individual will have both male and female reproductive organs. This species is also gonochoristic, meaning that an individual organism’s sex will not change over time, and there is no current record of any M. guyanensis individual exhibiting hermaphroditism or protandry. In any given population, the ratio between males and females is generally 1:1, and sexes are observable in individuals that reach a certain size—which is estimated to be around 30mm in length. These individuals are identified as either male or female based on gonad color, which can be observed if the shell is opened. Female M. guyanensis present with yellow-colored gonads while their counterparts present with a range of darker, brown-colored gonads. However, there is no noticeable sexual dimorphism of the shell in males and females of this species.

Saltwater mussel species like that of M. guyanensis fertilize internally, although males will release spermatozoa into the water for females to take in. Individuals within this species of mussel reach maturity at one fourth of their total length, which is estimated to be about 18–22 mm, although females typically require a greater length of time for gonadal development. These mussels have been observed to breed continuously throughout the year, which has provided researchers and conservationists the opportunity to study the consistently growing population. However, there are two peaks in the annual breeding season that experience greater activity. The first of these two seasons is September through November, spawning activity reaching the peak in November. The second of these two seasons is February through April, with spawning activity reaching the peak in March. These breeding seasons are apexes in the wet and dry seasons of their geographic distribution, and the breeding seasons are generally considered consistent throughout globally distributed populations of M. guyanensis. The peaks in breeding activity are generally ruled by female activity as oocyte diameter and gonad area are largely important indicators of successful breeding.

Considering general tenants of bivalve reproduction characteristics and patterns, it is likely that within this species, the younger (and thus more populus) individuals will have the greatest reproduction rates. The decrease in reproductive capabilities with age is consistent with other bivalve species in that reproduction comes at a high metabolic cost. As organisms age, metabolism efficiency diminishes, thus slowing reproduction. Abiotic indicators of favorable breeding environments include higher salinity values which occur in the dry season, which is ideal for spermatozoa production. Some research has indicated that salinity may not have a strong impact on M. guyanensis gametogenesis as results of a study indicated that rainfall, which impacts the salinity of a region, did not deter reproduction activity.
