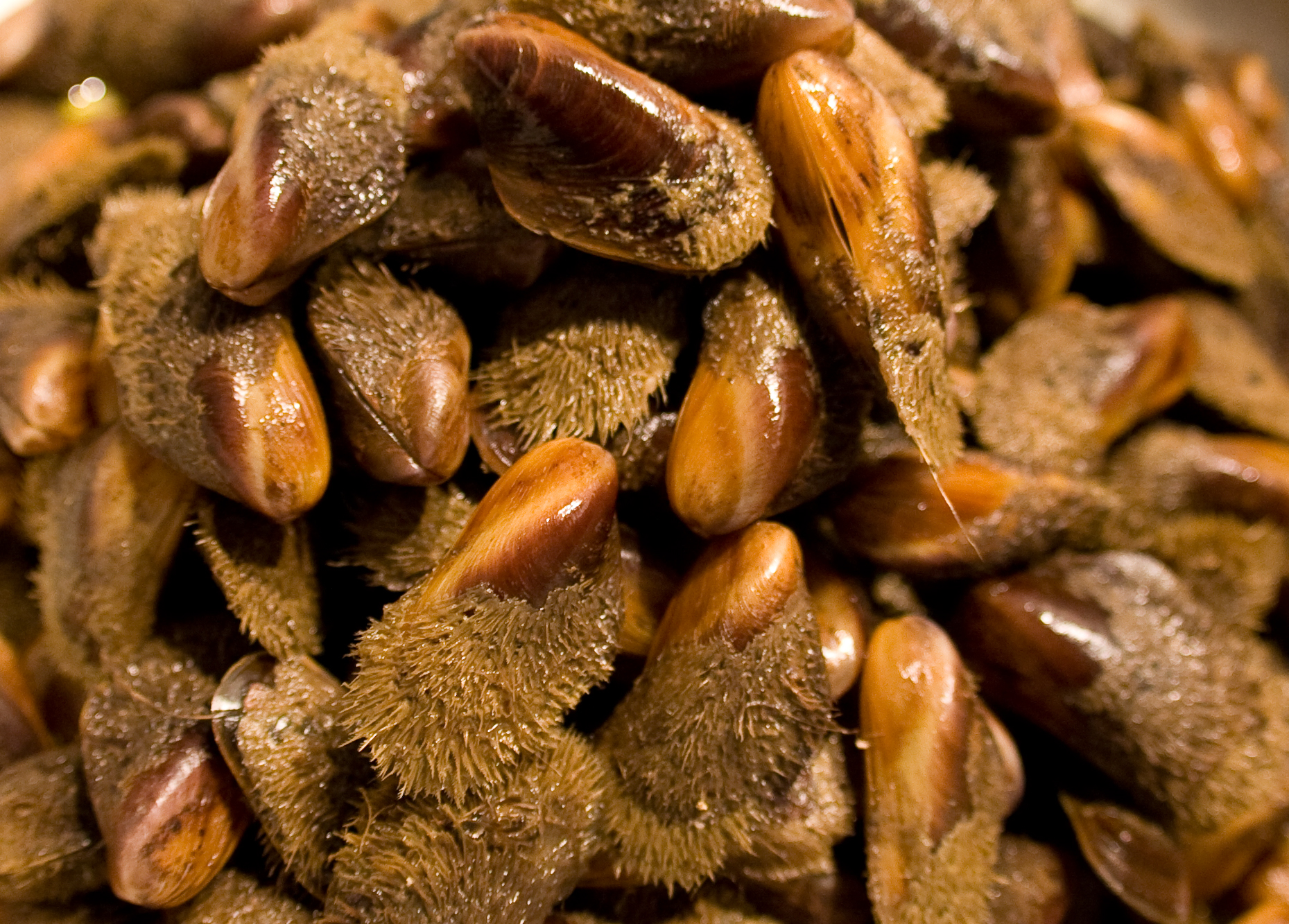
- Live Modiolus barbatus for sale as seafood

Scientific classification
- Kingdom: Animalia
- Phylum: Mollusca
- Class: Bivalvia
- Order: Mytilida
- Family: Modiolidae
- Genus: Modiolus; Lamarck, 1799

Type species
- Modiolus modiolus (Linnaeus, 1758)

Species
- See text.

Synonyms
- Eumodiolus Ihering, 1900; Modiola Lamarck, 1801

= Modiolus (bivalve) =

Genus of medium-sized marine bivalve molluscs in the family Mytilidae

Modiolus, the horsemussels, are a genus of medium-sized marine bivalve molluscs in the family Mytilidae.

== Fossil record ==
Fossils of species within this very ancient genus can be found in sediments from the Devonian period to recent (age range: 409.1 to 0.0 Ma).

Modiolus bipartitus
Middle Jurassic

Modiolus giganteus
Middle Jurassic

== Species ==
Species within the genus Modiolus include:

- Modiolus adriaticus (Lamarck, 1819)
- Modiolus albicostus (Lamarck, 1819)
- Modiolus americanus (Leach, 1815) - tulip mussel
- Modiolus areolatus (Gould, 1850)
- Modiolus auriculatus (Krauss, 1848)
- Modiolus aurum Osorio Ruiz, 1979
- Modiolus barbatus (Linnaeus, 1758) - bearded horsemussel
- Modiolus capax (Conrad, 1837) - fat horsemussel
- Modiolus carpenteri (Soot-Ryen, 1963) - California horsemussel
- Modiolus carvalhoi Klappenbach, 1966
- Modiolus cecillii (Philippi, 1847)
- Modiolus cimbricus Ockelmann and Cedhagen, 2019
- Modiolus comptus (Sowerby III, 1915)
- †Modiolus concentrice (Roemer, 1849)
- Modiolus demissus
- Modiolus eiseni (Strong and Hertlein, 1937) - eisen horsemussel
- Modiolus ficoides Macsotay & Campos, 2001
- Modiolus gallicus (Dautzenberg, 1895)
- Modiolus gubernaculum (Dunker, 1856)
- Modiolus kurilensis F. R. Bernard, 1983
- Modiolus lulat (Dautzenberg, 1891)
- Modiolus margaritaceus (Nomura & Hatai, 1940)
- Modiolus matris Pilsbry, 1921
- Modiolus modiolus (Linnaeus, 1758) - northern horsemussel
- Modiolus modulaides (Röding, 1798)
- Modiolus neglectus (Soot-Ryen, 1955) - neglected horsemussel
- Modiolus nicklesi Ockelmann, 1983
- Modiolus nipponicus (Oyama, 1950)
- Modiolus patagonicus (d'Orbigny, 1842)
- †Modiolus Pedernalis (Roemer, 1849)
- Modiolus penetectus (Verco, 1907)
- Modiolus peronianus Laseron, 1956
- Modiolus phaseolinus
- Modiolus philippinarum (Hanley, 1843)
- Modiolus plumescens (Dunker, 1868)
- Modiolus rectus (Conrad, 1837) - straight horsemussel
- Modiolus rumphii (Philippi, 1847)
- Modiolus sacculifer (S. S. Berry, 1953) - bag horsemussel
- Modiolus squamosus Beauperthuy, 1967
- Modiolus stultorum (Jousseaume, 1893)
- Modiolus traillii (Reeve, 1857)
- Modiolus tumbezensis Pilsbry & Olsson, 1935
- Modiolus verdensis Cosel, 1995

== See also ==
- Modiolus (disambiguation)
