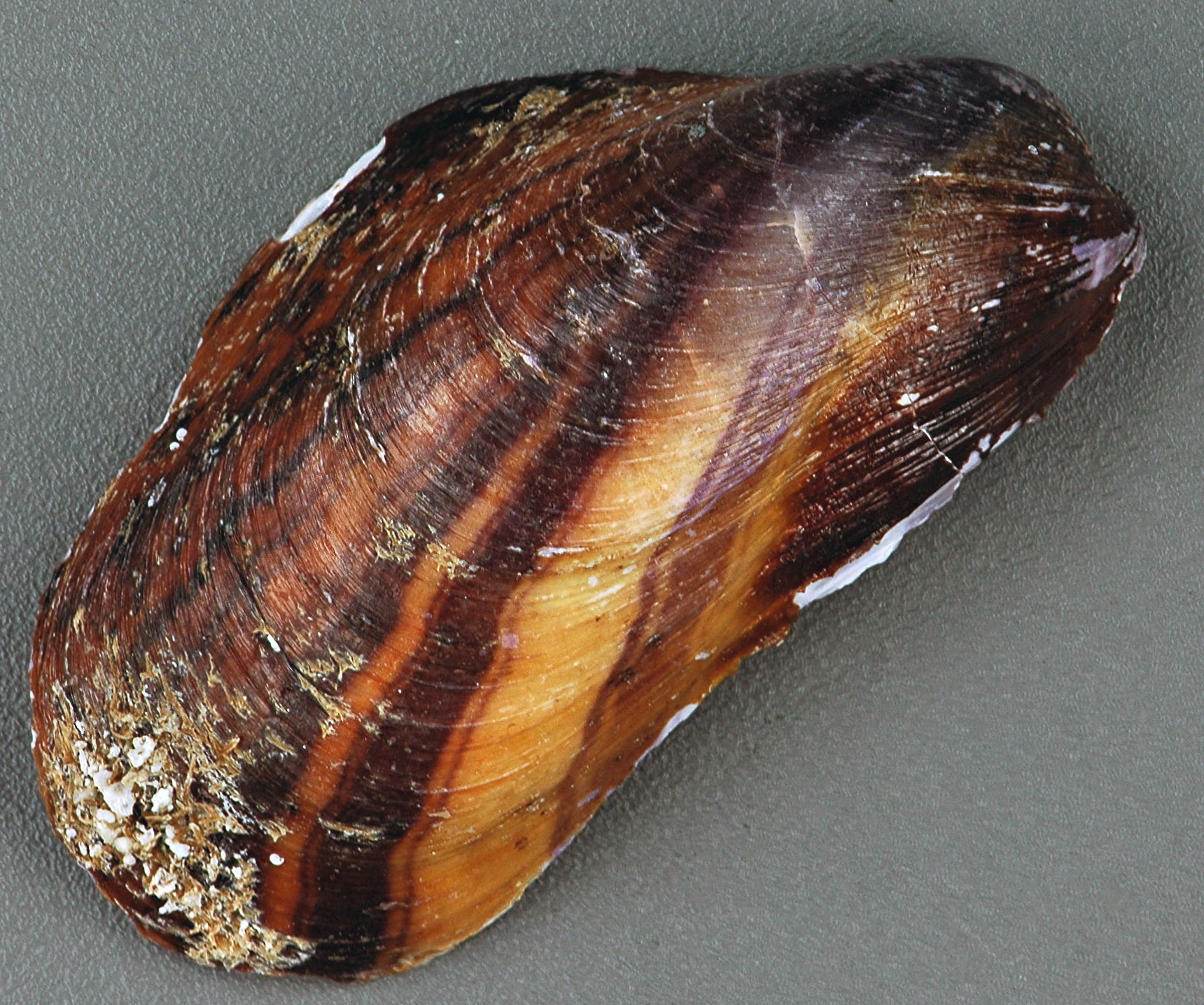

Scientific classification
- Kingdom: Animalia
- Phylum: Mollusca
- Class: Bivalvia
- Order: Mytilida
- Family: Modiolidae
- Genus: Modiolus
- Species: M. americanus

Binomial name
- Modiolus americanus (Leach, 1815)

= Modiolus americanus =

Species of bivalve

Modiolus americanus, or the tulip mussel, is a species of bivalve mollusc in the family Mytilidae. It can be found along the Atlantic coast of North America, ranging from North Carolina to the West Indies.

Right and left valve of the same specimen:

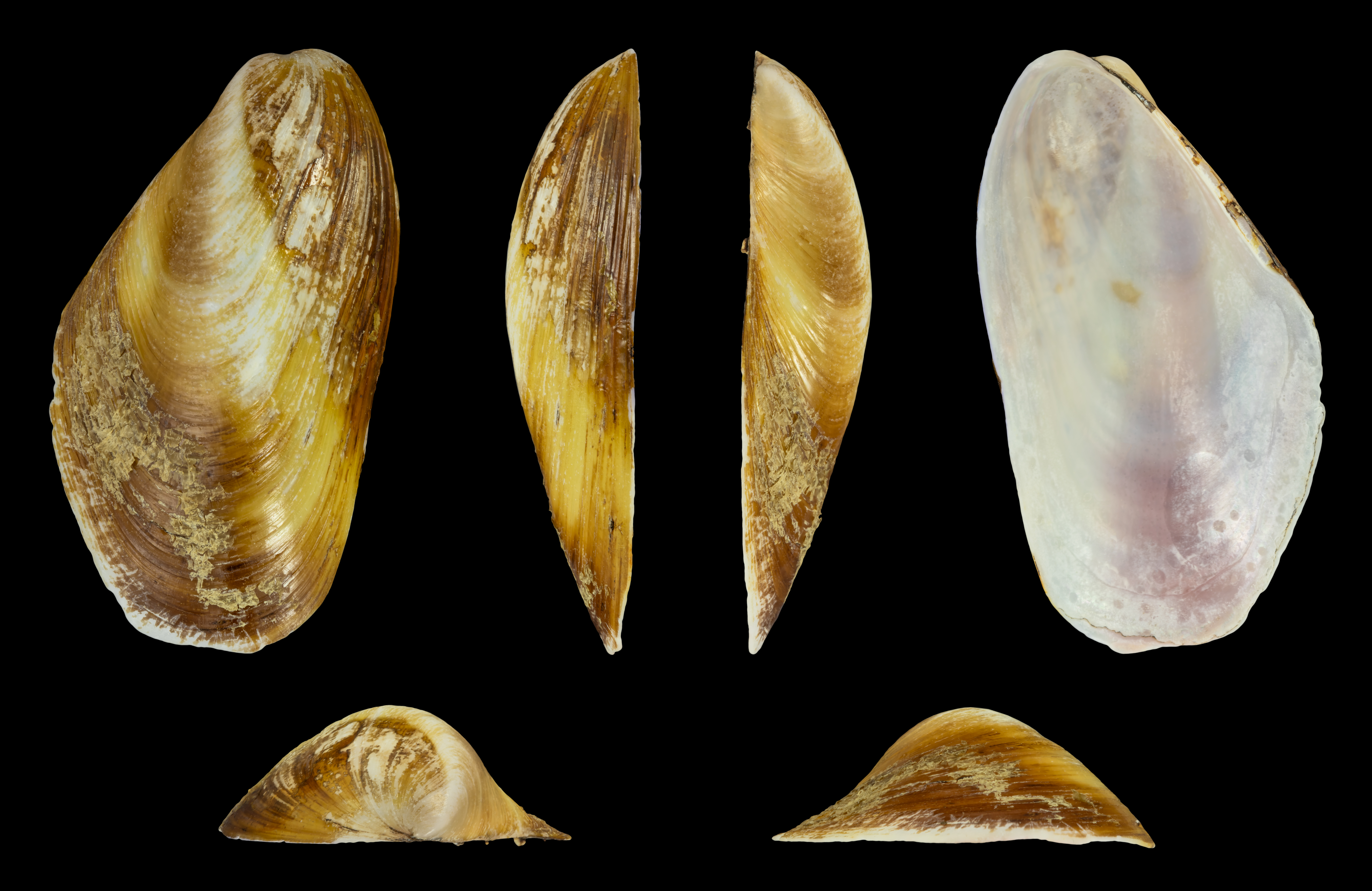
Right valve

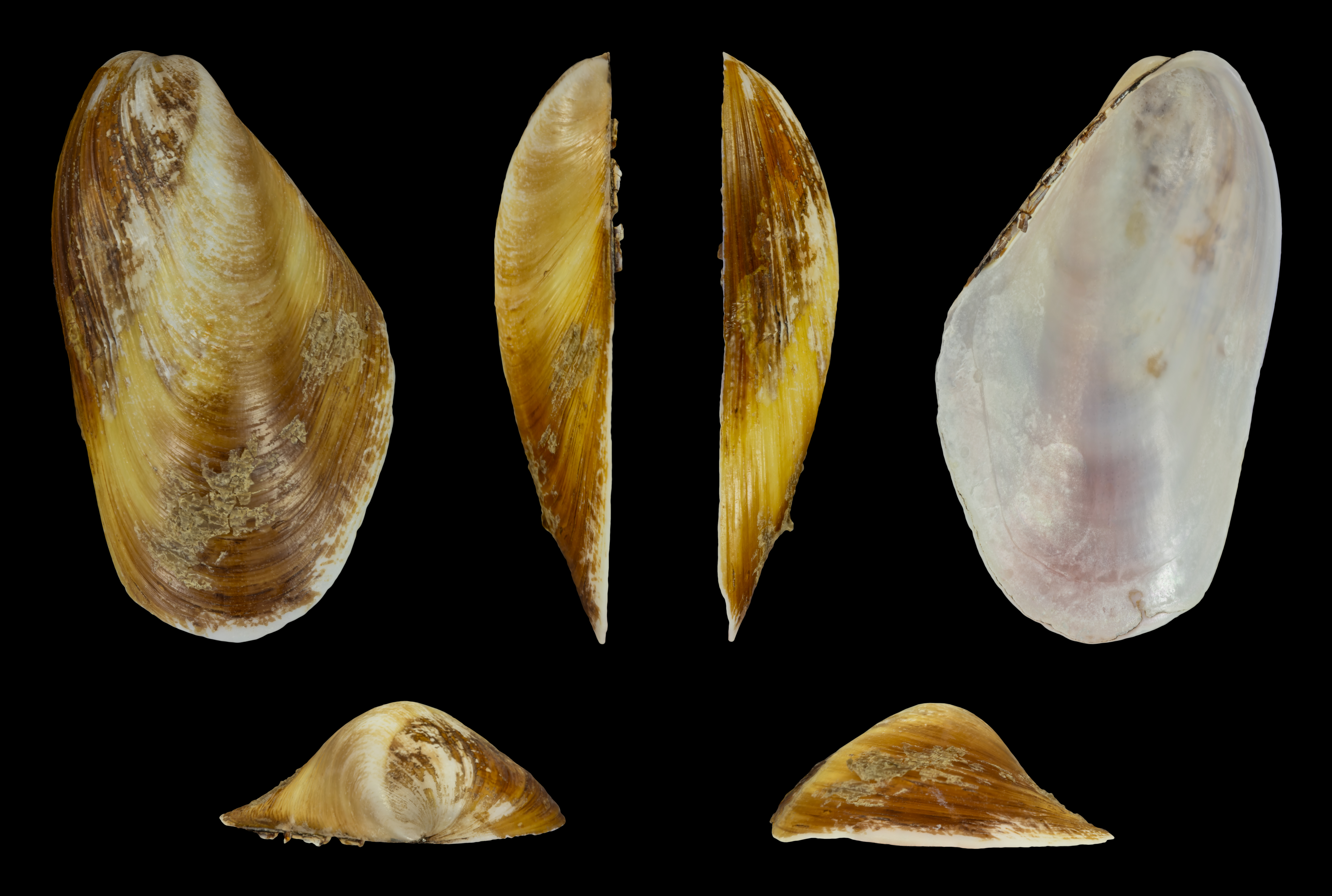
Left valve
