= Modiolus carvalhoi =

Scientific classification
- Kingdom: Animalia
- Phylum: Mollusca
- Class: Bivalvia
- Order: Mytilida
- Family: Modiolidae
- Genus: Modiolus
- Species: M. carvalhoi

Binomial name
- Modiolus carvalhoi Klappenbach, 1966

Species of bivalve

Modiolus carvalhoi is a species of bivalve mollusc, commonly known as a horsemussel, described by Klappenbach in 1966. It belongs to the genus Modiolus, which includes other species of horsemussels. Modiolus carvalhoi is part of the family Mytilidae, the mussels.
