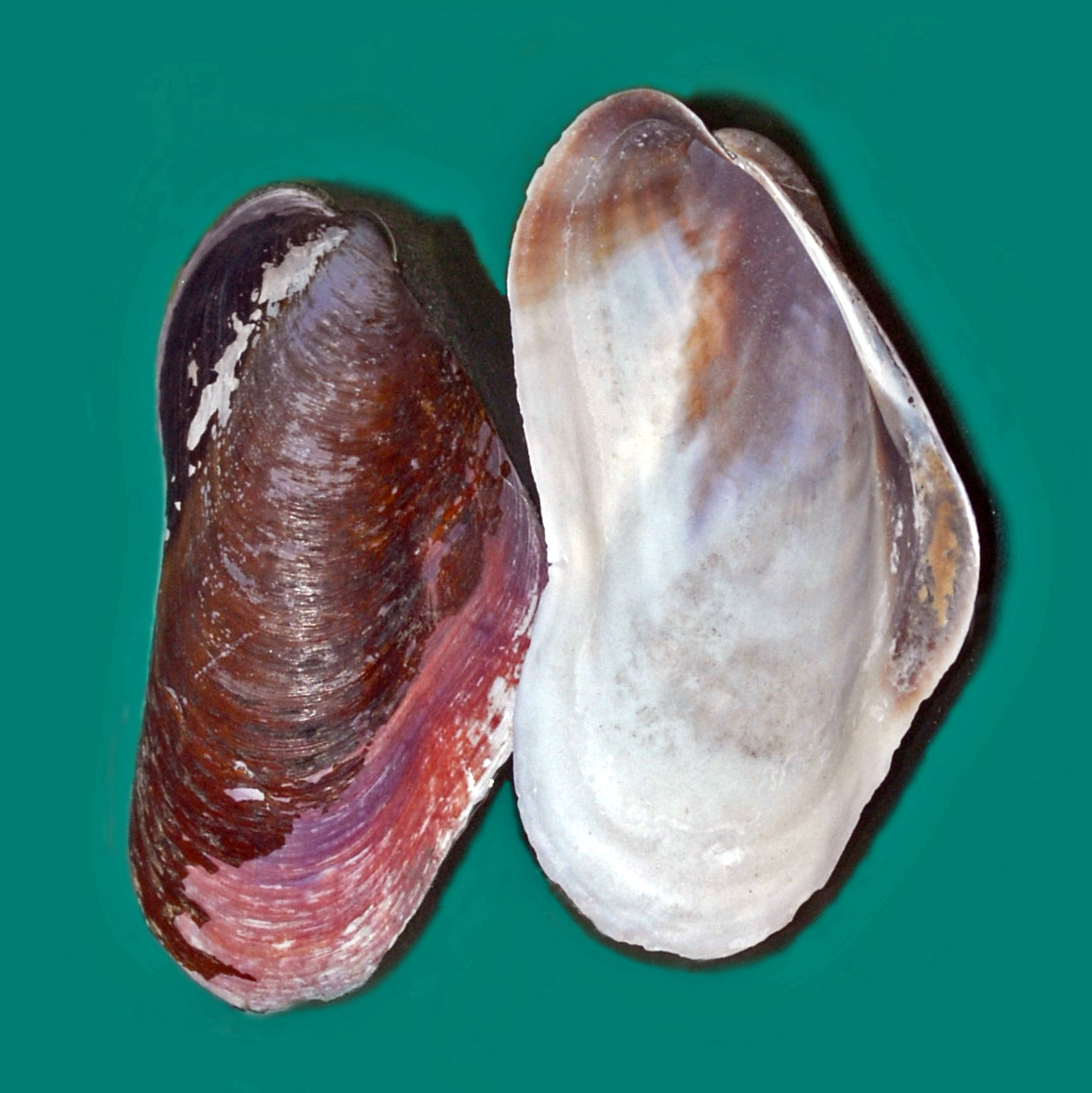
- Two shells of Modiolus philippinarum

Scientific classification
- Kingdom: Animalia
- Phylum: Mollusca
- Class: Bivalvia
- Order: Mytilida
- Family: Modiolidae
- Genus: Modiolus
- Species: M. philippinarum

Binomial name
- Modiolus philippinarum Hanley, 1843

Synonyms
- Modiola philippinarum Hanley, 1843

= Modiolus philippinarum =

Species of bivalve

Modiolus philippinarum, common name Philippine horse mussel, is a species of "horse mussel", a marine bivalve mollusc in the family Mytilidae, the mussels.

== Description ==
Shells of Modiolus philippinarum can reach a length of 74–87 millimetres (2.9–3.4 in), with a maximum of about 130 millimetres (5.1 in). These shells are thin but solid, swollen, elongate-ovate and roughly trapeziform. The anterior margin is short, while posterodorsal margin is long and oblique in relation to the ventral margin. Hind margin is convex and hinge-line is approximately one half the total length. Outer surface of the shell shows many concentric growth striae. The basic color of the external surface is yellowish brown, while the interior varies from pearly white to purplish red.

Right and left valve of the same specimen:

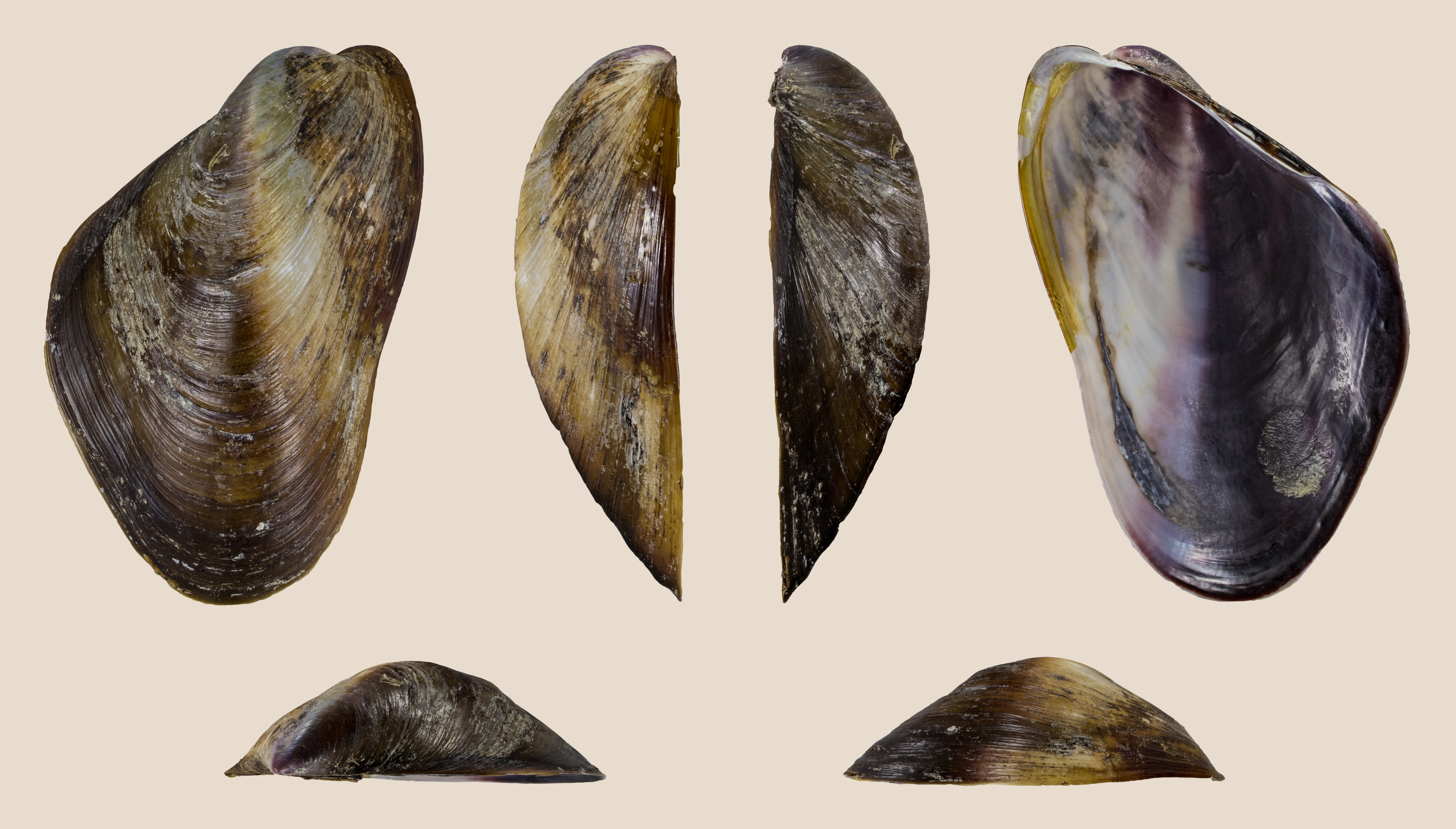
Right valve

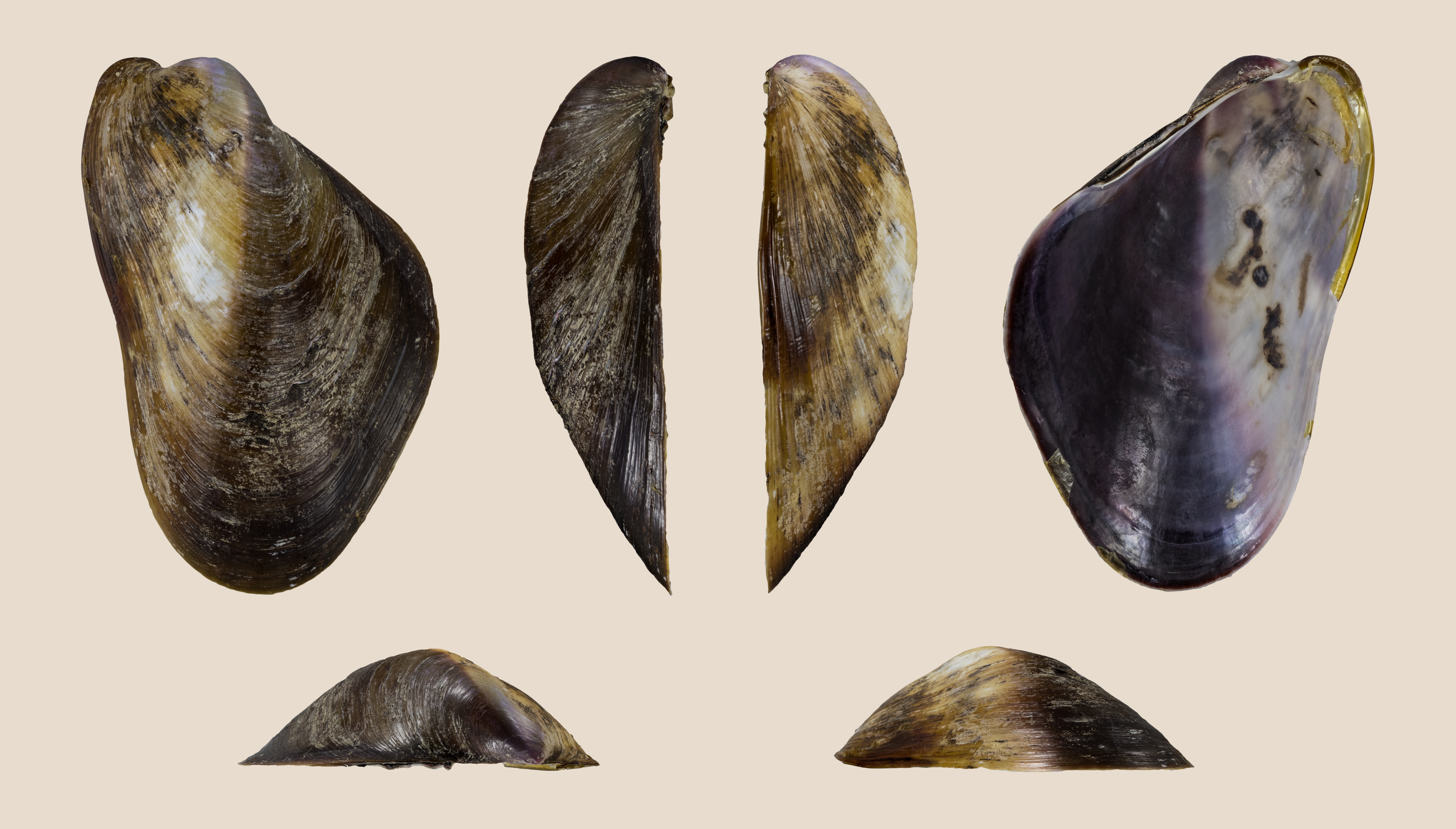
Left valve

== Distribution and habitat ==
This species is present in the Red Sea, Madagascar and Indo-Pacific, from eastern Africa, to eastern Indonesia; north to Japan and south to Queensland and Western Australia. It inhabits sublittoral muds, at depth of 0-40m.
