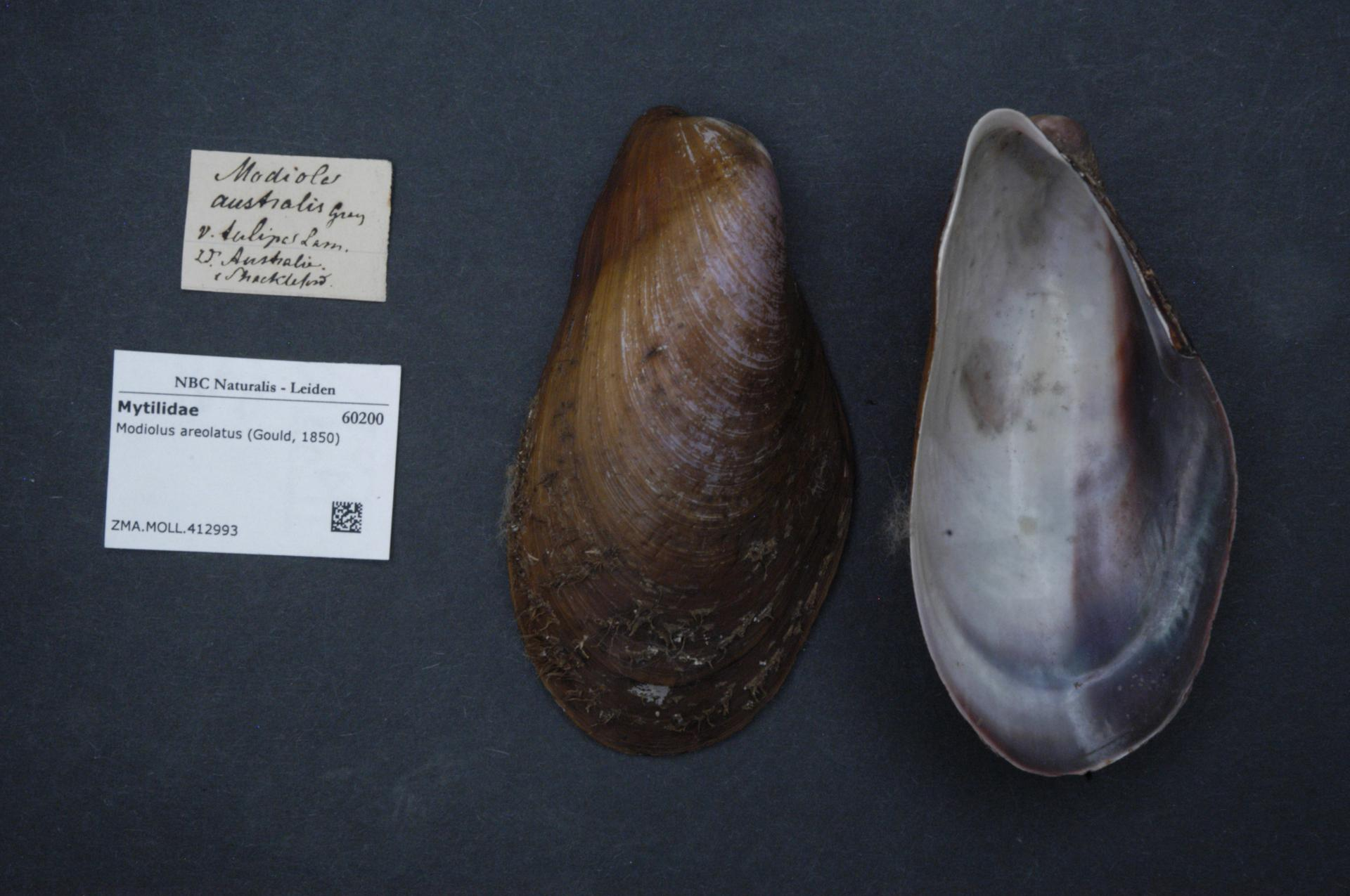

Scientific classification
- Kingdom: Animalia
- Phylum: Mollusca
- Class: Bivalvia
- Order: Mytilida
- Family: Modiolidae
- Genus: Modiolus
- Species: M. areolatus

Binomial name
- Modiolus areolatus (Gould, 1850)

= Modiolus areolatus =

Species of bivalve

Modiolus areolatus, or the bearded horse mussel, is a species of bivalve mollusc in the family Mytilidae (mussels). It is found in New Zealand, and its shell typically is 90 millimetres (3.5 in).
