= Modiolus (cochlea) =

Conical shaped central axis in the cochlea

- Interior of right osseous labyrinth. (Modiolus not labeled, but is represented at the axis of the spiral of the cochlea at the right.)

Details

Identifiers
- Latin: modiolus, columella cochleae
- TA98: A15.3.03.038
- TA2: 6980
- FMA: 61278

The modiolus is a conical shaped central axis in the cochlea. The modiolus consists of spongy bone and the cochlea turns approximately 2.75 times around the central axis in humans. The cochlear nerve, as well as spiral ganglion is situated inside it. The cochlear nerve conducts impulses from the receptors located within the cochlea.

The picture shows the osseous labyrinth. The modiolus is not labeled; it's at the axis of the spiral of the cochlea.

== See also ==
- Modiolus (disambiguation)
