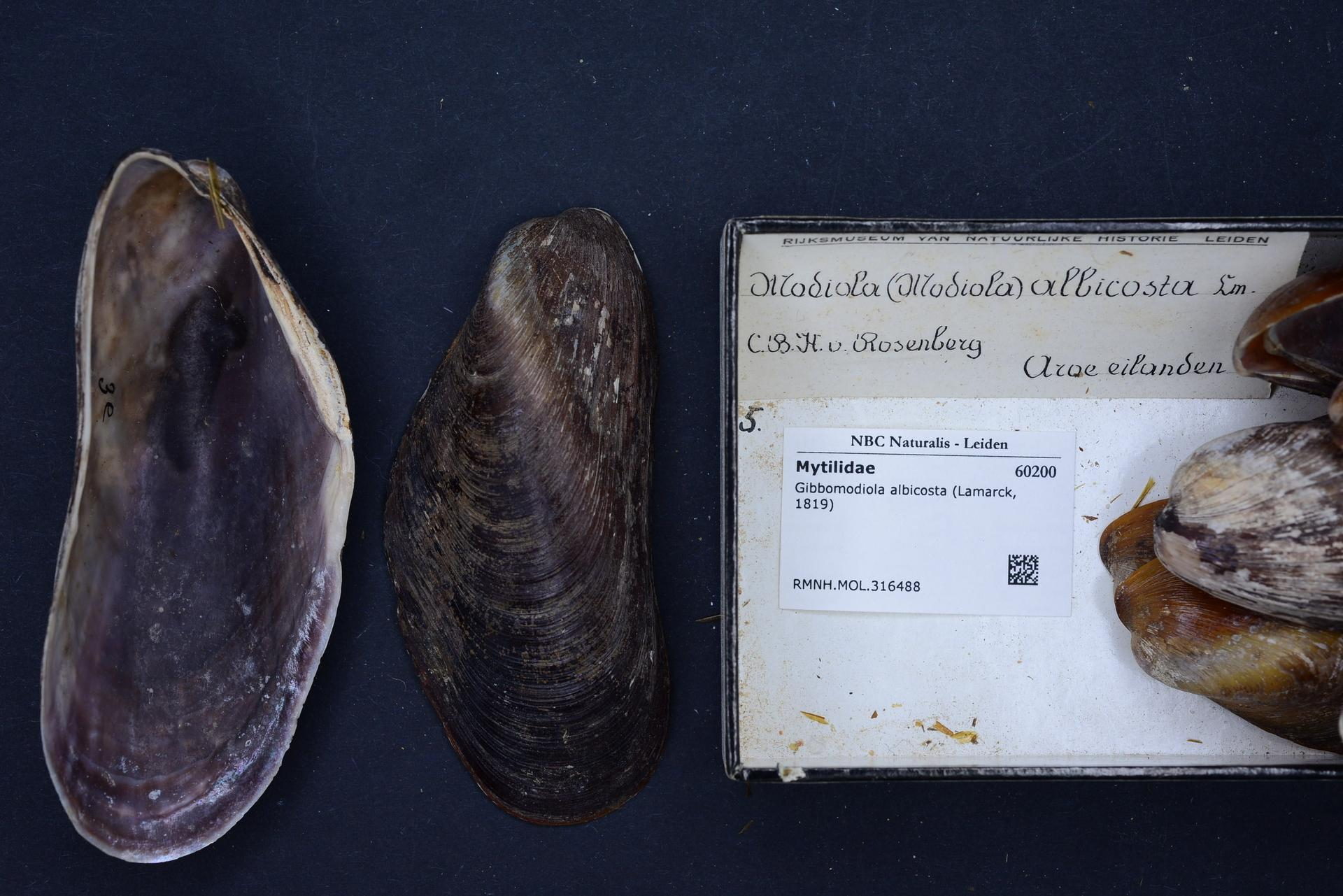
- Gibbomodiola albicosta

Scientific classification
- Domain: Eukaryota
- Kingdom: Animalia
- Phylum: Mollusca
- Class: Bivalvia
- Order: Mytilida
- Family: Mytilidae
- Genus: Gibbomodiola; Sacco, 1898

= Gibbomodiola =

Genus of bivalves

Gibbomodiola is a genus of bivalves belonging to the family Mytilidae.

The species of this genus are found in Europe, Southeastern Asia and Australia.

Species:

- Gibbomodiola adriatica (Lamarck, 1819)
- Gibbomodiola albicosta (Lamarck, 1819)
- Gibbomodiola biradiata (Hanley, 1843)
- Gibbomodiola taurarcuata Sacco, 1898
