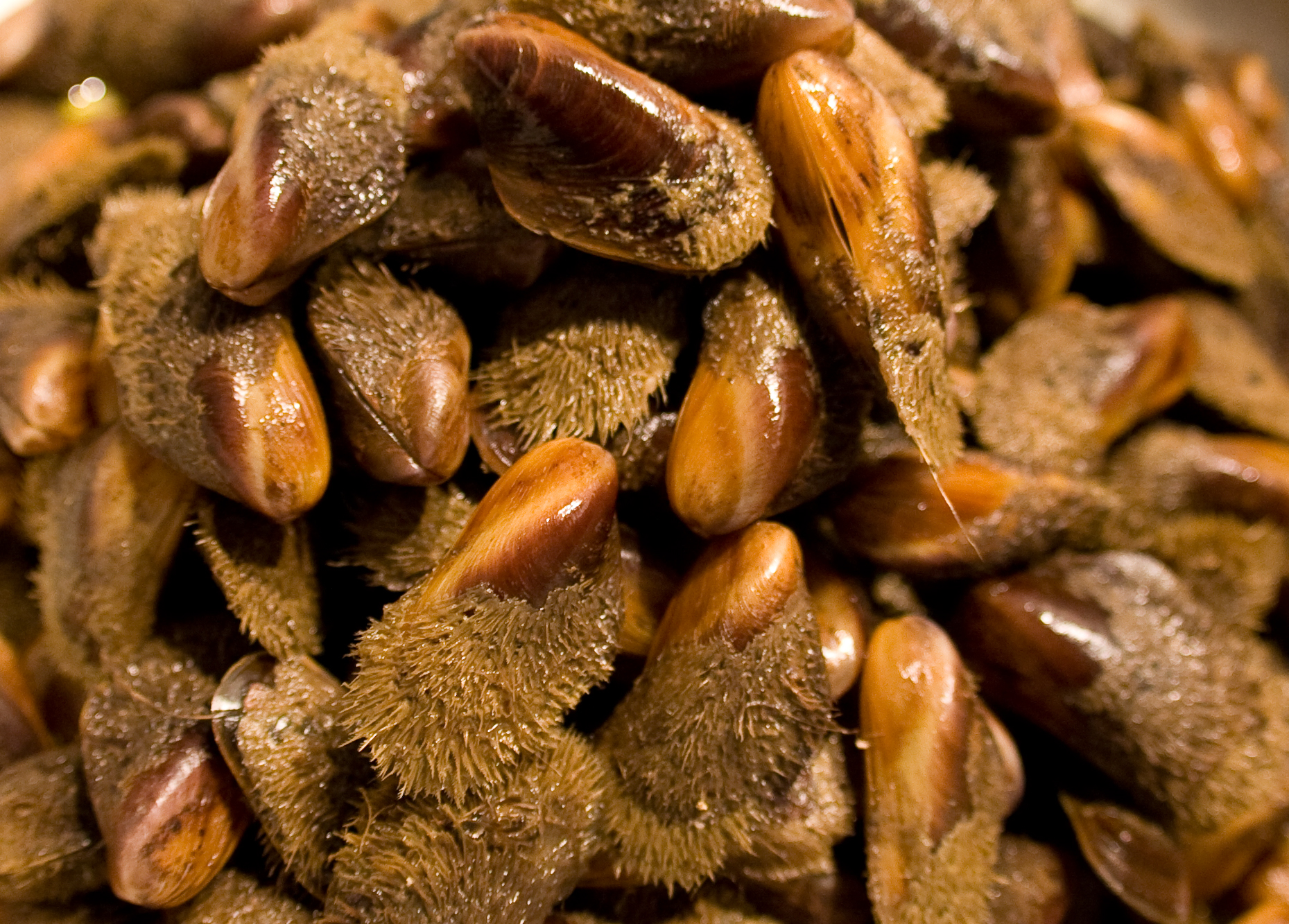

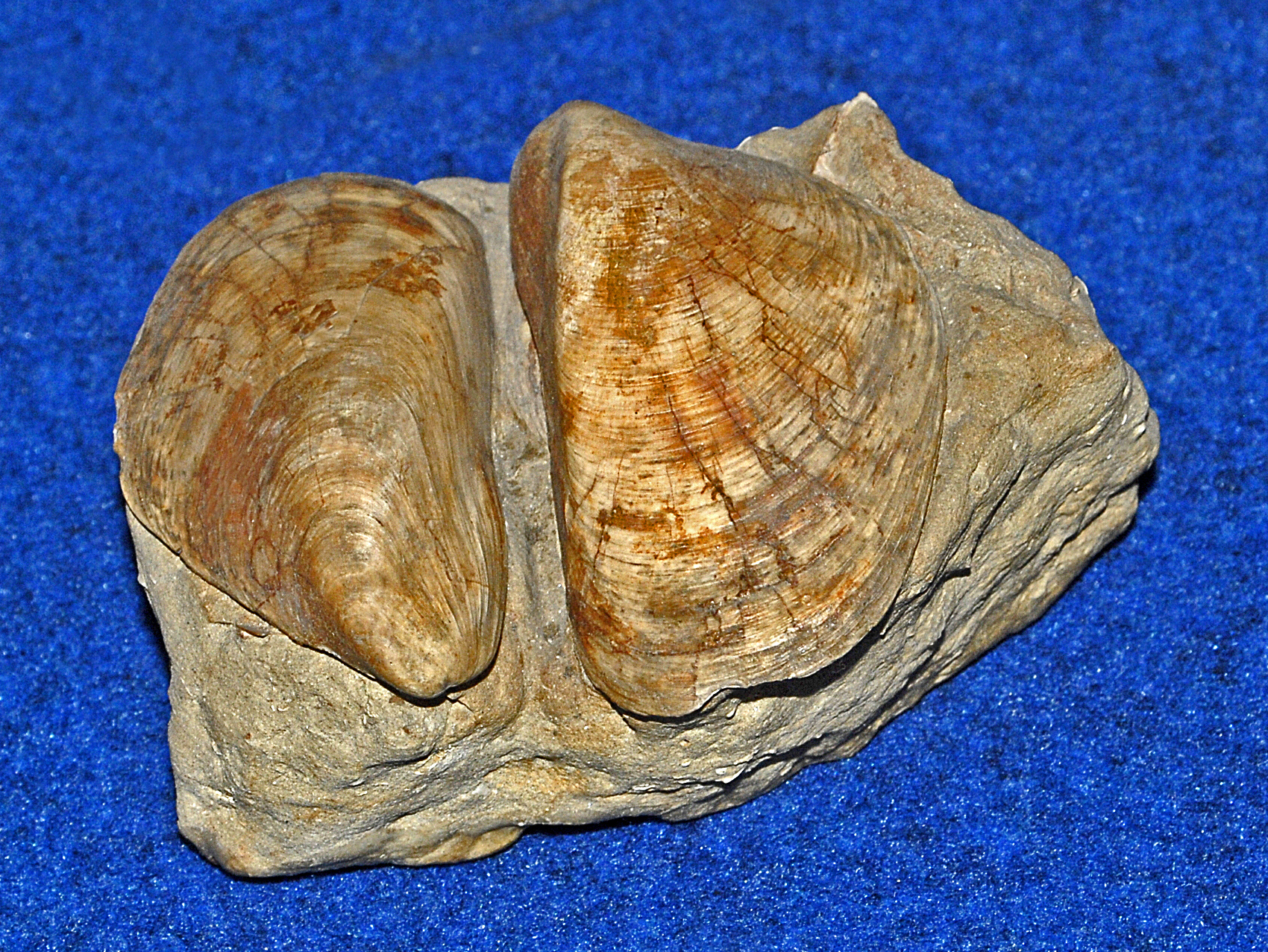
- Fossil shells of Modiolus barbatus from Pliocene of Italy

Scientific classification
- Kingdom: Animalia
- Phylum: Mollusca
- Class: Bivalvia
- Order: Mytilida
- Family: Modiolidae
- Genus: Modiolus
- Species: M. barbatus

Binomial name
- Modiolus barbatus (Linnaeus, 1758)

Synonyms
- Modiola gibbsii Leach, 1815; Modiola mytiloides Locard, 1888; Modiola pterota Locard, 1888; Modiola villlosa Nardo, 1847; Mytilus barbatus Linnaeus, 1758; Mytilus gibbsianus Leach en Gray, 1852; Mytilus incurvatus Pennant, 1777; Mytilus ruber Linnaeus, 1758

= Modiolus barbatus =

Modiolus barbatus Temporal range: Pliocene - Recent

Species of bivalve

Modiolus barbatus, commonly called the bearded horse mussel, is a species of "horse mussel", a marine bivalve mollusc in the family Mytilidae, the mussels.

The fossil record of this species dates back to the Pliocene (age range: 3.6 to 2.588 million years ago).

== Description ==
The shell of an adult Modiolus barbatus can be as long as 30–60 millimetres (1.2–2.4 in). The shape is elongated and ovoid or rhomboidal with a curved or obtuse dorsal margin. The outer surface of the shell is dark brown, while the inside of the valves is blue or slightly iridescent gray. These mussles are characterized by a periostracum with long, stiff, flat bristles. They are attached with strong byssus to the underground.

== Distribution and habitat ==
This species is present from the Mediterranean Sea to the Black Sea, on the southern and western coasts of Great Britain and Ireland and along the Atlantic coast of Morocco. It inhabits in large communities on rocks and stones the coastal marine environments at depths of 5 to 110 m.

== Human use ==
The bearded horse mussels are harvested for human consumption from their natural beds, together with Mytilus galloprovincialis.

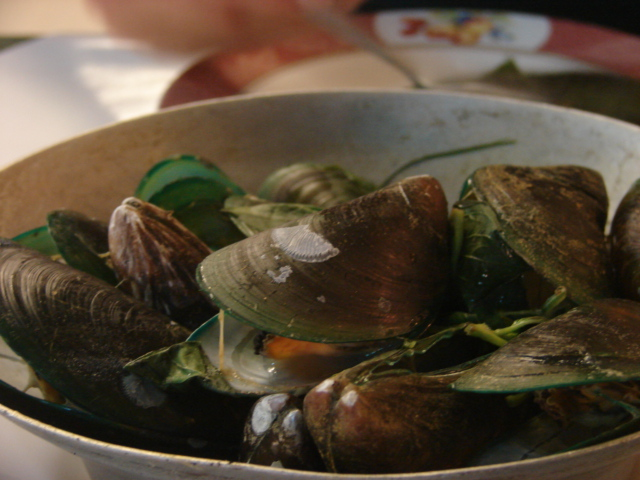
Green mussels being cooked in Kerala, India
