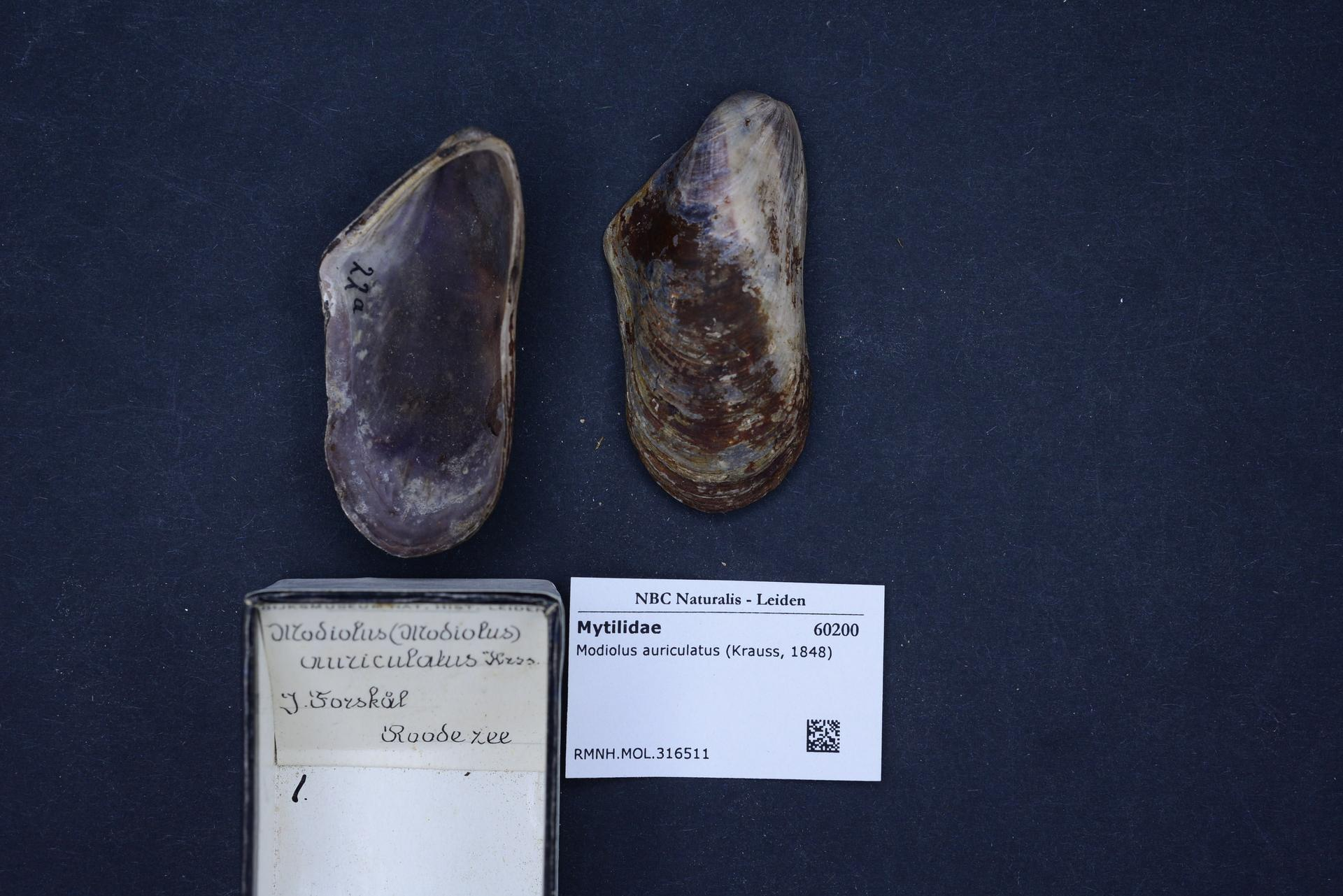

Scientific classification
- Kingdom: Animalia
- Phylum: Mollusca
- Class: Bivalvia
- Order: Mytilida
- Family: Modiolidae
- Genus: Modiolus
- Species: M. auriculatus

Binomial name
- Modiolus auriculatus (Krauss, 1848)

Synonyms
- Limnoperna hepatica (Gould, 1850); Modiola auriculata Krauss, 1848; Modiola cymbula Preston, 1908; Modiola rufanensis Turton, 1932; Modiolus agripetus (Iredale, 1939); Modiolus auriculatus var. aurantius Jousseaume in Lamy, 1919; Modiolus semifuscus Lamarck; Mytilus hepaticus Gould, 1850; Volsella agripetus Iredale, 1939

= Modiolus auriculatus =

Species of bivalve

Modiolus auriculatus, the eared horse mussel, is a bivalve mollusc of the family, Mytilidae, which has a natural range in the Indian and Pacific Oceans. It has colonised the eastern Mediterranean Sea from the Red Sea by Lessepsian migration via the Suez Canal.

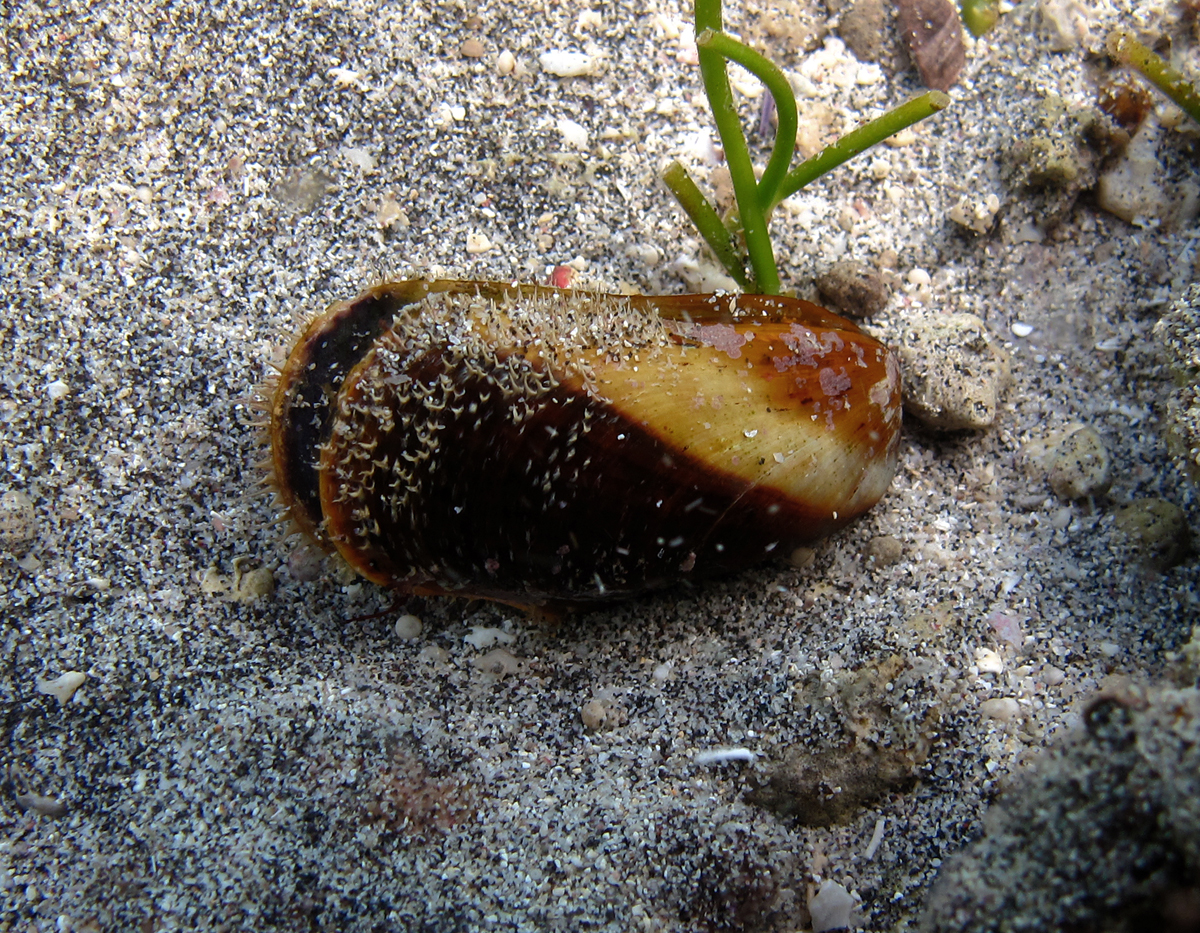
Modiolus auriculatus

== Description ==
Modiolus auriculatus has an equivalve shell with each valve being inequilateral with their beaks being very close to the anterior end. The shell is the typical mussel form with the ligament and dorsal margins distinctly disjunct and the dorsal and ventral margins being parallel; the dorsal margin is concave. The shell has a smooth with growth lines and the covering periostracum is pubescent. The outer surfaces of the shell is olive-brownish or orange-brown and the shell interior is browny-purple. The commonly grow to a shell size of 70mm.

== Distribution ==
Modiolus auriculatus occurs naturally in the Indian Ocean and the Pacific Ocean from the Red Sea south to South Africa, east to eastern Polynesia, north as far as Japan and south to Australia. It was first recorded in Suez Canal in the 1900s and in the Mediterranean in 1935 off the coast of Palestine most likely after the planktonic larvae had travelled through the Suez Canal. Its Mediterranean distribution is still largely restricted to the coast off Israel where it is not uncommon.

== Biology ==
Modiolus auriculatus is not restricted to a single specific habitat, it is commonest in rocky habitats and least common in areas which contain rocky sand and algae. It is often associated with small holes in rocky shores, especially on the seaward edge of sea grass beds and at the landward margin of ridges vegetated with algae. In the Red Sea spawning individuals were found throughout the year but with a peak in March through to June/July and all sexually mature individuals had a shell length in excess of 30mm. Water temperatures appear to be an important controlling factor in the spawning of this species

== Uses ==
Modiolus auriculatus has been suggested as a biological indicator used to monitor marine pollution in tropical waters.
