= Modiolus =

Modiolus can refer to:

- Modiolus (cochlea)
- Modiolus (face)
- Modiolus (bivalve), a genus of mussels in the Mytilidae
