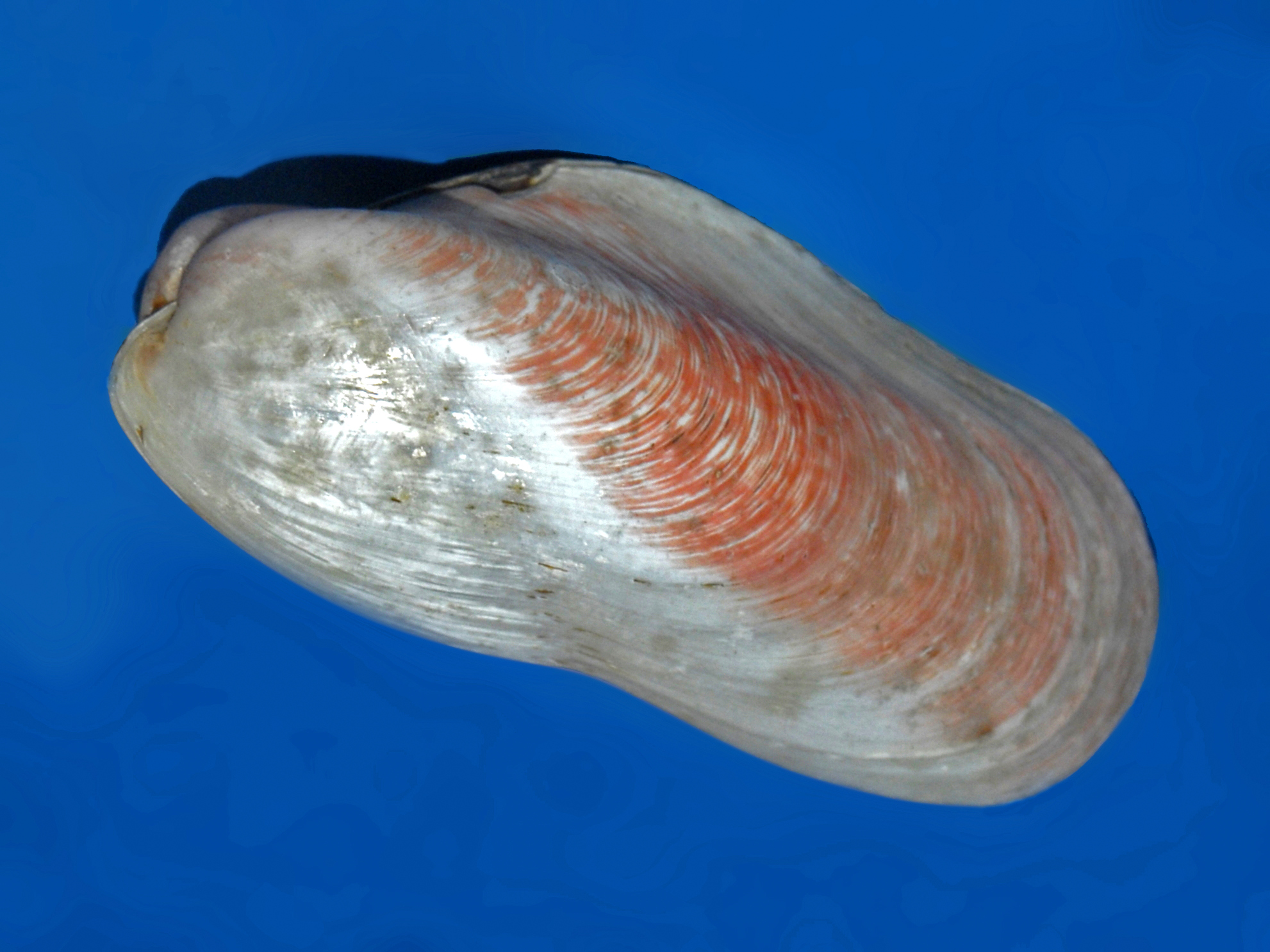
- A shell of Modiolus albicostus from Indochina on display at the Museo Civico di Storia Naturale di Milano

Scientific classification
- Kingdom: Animalia
- Phylum: Mollusca
- Class: Bivalvia
- Order: Mytilida
- Family: Modiolidae
- Genus: Modiolus
- Species: M. albicostus

Binomial name
- Modiolus albicostus Lamarck, 1819

Synonyms
- Modiola albicosta Lamarck, 1819; Modiolus delinificus Iredale, 1924; Gibbomodiola albicosta Lamarck, 1819

= Modiolus albicostus =

Species of bivalve

Modiolus albicostus is a species of "horse mussel", a marine bivalve mollusc in the family Mytilidae, the mussels.

== Description ==
The shell of an adult Modiolus albicostus can be as long as 75–105 millimetres (3.0–4.1 in).

== Distribution ==
This species is widespread from Indochina to Southwestern Australia.
