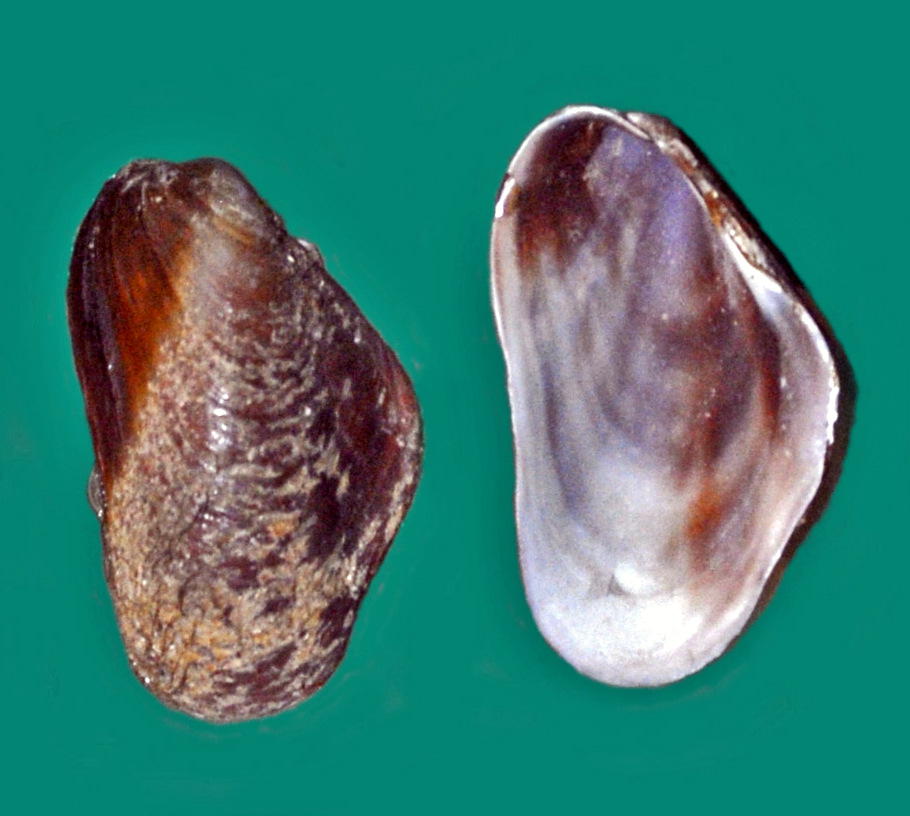
- Two shells of Modiolus capax

Scientific classification
- Kingdom: Animalia
- Phylum: Mollusca
- Class: Bivalvia
- Order: Mytilida
- Family: Modiolidae
- Genus: Modiolus
- Species: M. capax

Binomial name
- Modiolus capax (Conrad, 1837)

Synonyms
- Modiola capax Conrad, 1837; Mytilus spatula Menke, 1848; Mytilus splendens Dunker, 1857

= Modiolus capax =

Species of bivalve

Modiolus capax, common name fat horsemussel, is a species of "horse mussel", a marine bivalve mollusc in the family Mytilidae, the mussels. It was first described to science by American malacologist Timothy Abbott Conrad in 1837. The type specimen was collected in San Diego by Thomas Nuttall.

Fossils of Modiolus capax have been found in Miocene epoch deposits, suggesting that this species is between 5.3 and 20.4 million years old.

== Description ==
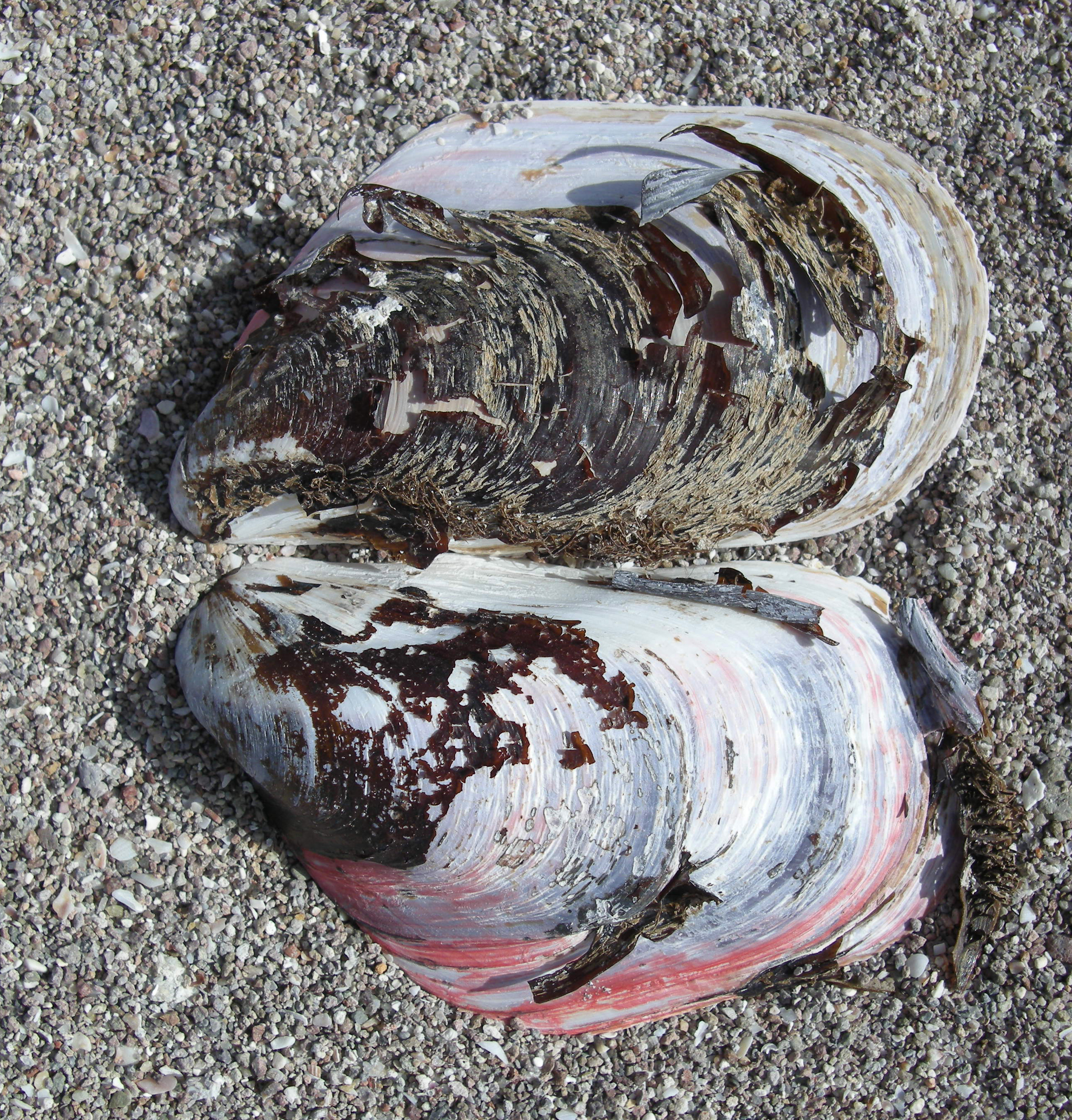
Modiolus capex, showing exterior of the valves with periostracum partially removed

Shells of Modiolus capax can reach a length of about 81 millimetres (3.2 in), a width of about 40 millimetres (1.6 in) and a diameter of about 36 millimetres (1.4 in). Individuals may weigh up to 144.1 grams (5.08 oz). This species has a quite variable form, but it always shows serrate hairs on the periostracum. The left valve is more inflated than the right one. The external surface of the shell is blue to bright orange brown, while the inside is reddish-violet on the posterior half.

== Distribution ==
This species is present in Santa Cruz, California, to Playa, Peru and in Galapagos Islands. It is found throughout the Gulf of California. Fat horsemussels live is shallow water from the intertidal zone to 25 fathoms. They live on rocks, boulders, and pebbles on the sea bottom and attached to wood pilings. Occasionally they can be found partially buried in mud.

== Life history ==
Fat horse mussels are gonochoric, that is to say that there are two sexes and each individual is either male or female. The reproduce by broadcast spawning, by releasing gametes into the sea where fertilization takes place. In laboratory conditions, a free-swimming veliger develops about 24 hours after fertilization, which develops an umbo about four days later. The pediveliger stage is reach in 10 to 12 days, at which point the animal is 275 micrometres (0.0108 in) long. Settlement to the bottom takes place 3 to 4 days later.

This species is a filter feeder, drawing seawater into its body where it filters out nutrients. It then ejects excess water and waste products into the sea.

== Human consumption ==
Local consumption of fat horsemussels takes place in coastal communities. The cultivation of Modiolus capax in aquaculture has been studied since the 1980s. Among the findings were that this species does not readily settle on the artificial substrates used by the industry and that it is relatively slow-growing. Consequently, this species is among the least promising for aquaculture.
