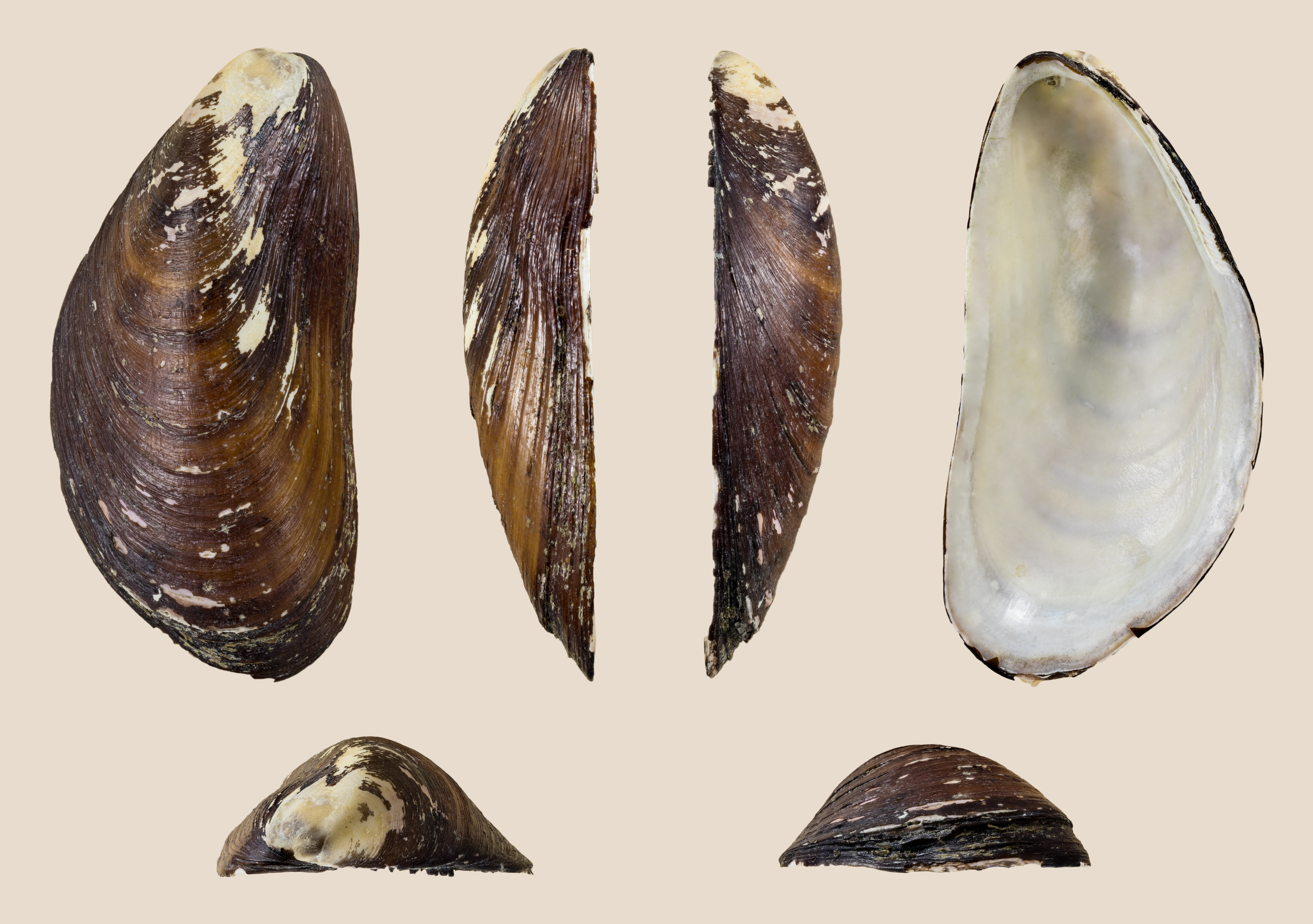

Scientific classification
- Domain: Eukaryota
- Kingdom: Animalia
- Phylum: Mollusca
- Class: Bivalvia
- Order: Mytilida
- Family: Mytilidae
- Genus: Gibbomodiola
- Species: G. adriatica

Binomial name
- Gibbomodiola adriatica (Lamarck, 1819)

= Gibbomodiola adriatica =

Species of bivalve

Gibbomodiola adriatica is a species of mussel commonly known as the Adriatic mussel. It can be found in: France, Ireland, the Mediterranean Sea, the North Atlantic Ocean, Sweden, Ukraine, and the United Kingdom.
