= List of marine molluscs of Chile =

This list of marine molluscs of Chile is a partial list of marine mollusc species which have been recorded in Chile. In other words, it is a list of salt water species of snails, clams and other molluscs. The list does not include land snails or slugs, or freshwater snails or clams.

== Polyplacophora ==
Order: Neoloricata

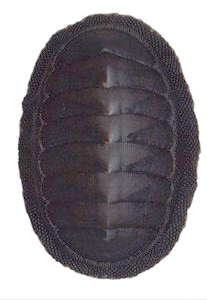
Chiton magnificus

Chaetopleuridae

- Chaetopleura peruviana

Chitonidae

- Acanthopleura echinata (Barnes, 1824)
- Chiton granosus
- Chiton magnificus (Deshayes, 1844)
- Tonicia atrata
- Tonicia chilensis
- Tonicia disjuncta
- Tonicia lebruni

Ischnochitonidae

- Chaetopleura angulata (Spengler, 1797)
- Chaetopleura benaventei
- Chaetopleura peruviana
- Ischnochiton pusio (Sowerby in Sow. & Brod, 1832)

Mopaliidae

- Plaxiphora aurata

== Gastropoda ==
Patellidae

- Cellana ardosioea (Hombron & Jacquinot, 1841)

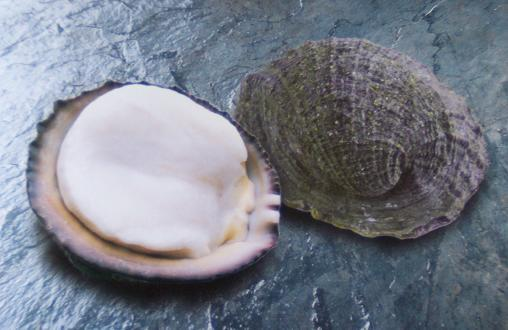
Concholepas concholepas

Cypraeidae

- Cypraea caputdraconis (Melvill, 1888)
- Cypraea englerti (Summers & Burgess, 1965)

Muricidae

- Chorus giganteus
- Concholepas concholepas - also referred as Chilean abalone. Local name: Loco
- Thais chocolata (Duclos, 1832) - local name: Locate
- Thais delessertiana (D'Orbigny, 1841)
- Thais haemastoma (Linnaeus, 1758)
- Xanthochorus buxeus
- Xanthochorus cassidiformis

Turbinellidae

- Columbarium tomicici (McLean & Andrade, 1982)

== Bivalvia ==
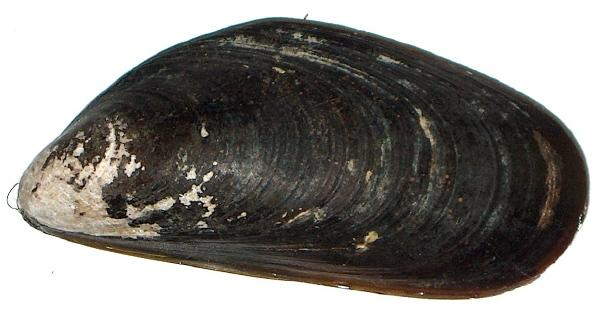
Mytilus platensis

=== Mytiloida ===
Mytilidae

- Aulacomya ater - local name Cholga
- Choromytilus chorus - local name Choro zapato
- Mytilus platensis (d'Orbigny, 1842) - local name Chorito
- Mytilus edulis - local name Choro
- Perna perna (Linnaeus, 1758) - local name Navaja or Huepo

=== Veneroida ===
Solenidae

- Ensis macha (Molina, 1782) - local name Navajuela

Veneridae

- Protothaca thaca (Molina, 1782) - local name: Almeja

Mesodesmatidae (Gray, 1839)

- Mesodesma donacium - local name: Macha

=== Ostreoida ===
Pectinidae

- Chlamys purpurata - local name: Ostión
- Chlamys patagonica - local name: Ostión del sur or Ostión patagónico

Ostreidae (Rafinesque, 1815)

- Crassostrea gigas - local name: Ostra del Pacífico
- Ostrea chilensis - local name: Ostra chilena

== Cephalopoda ==
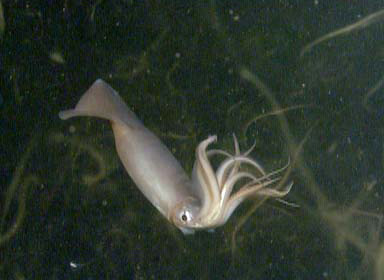
Dosidicus gigas

=== Teuthida ===
Ommastrephidae

- Dosidicus gigas (D'Orbigny, 1835). Also known as Humboldt squid.

=== Octopoda ===
Octopodidae

- Enteroctopus megalocyathus (Gould, 1852) - local name: Pulpo de Chiloé
- Octopus mimus

== See also ==
- List of non-marine molluscs of Chile
- Wildlife of Chile
