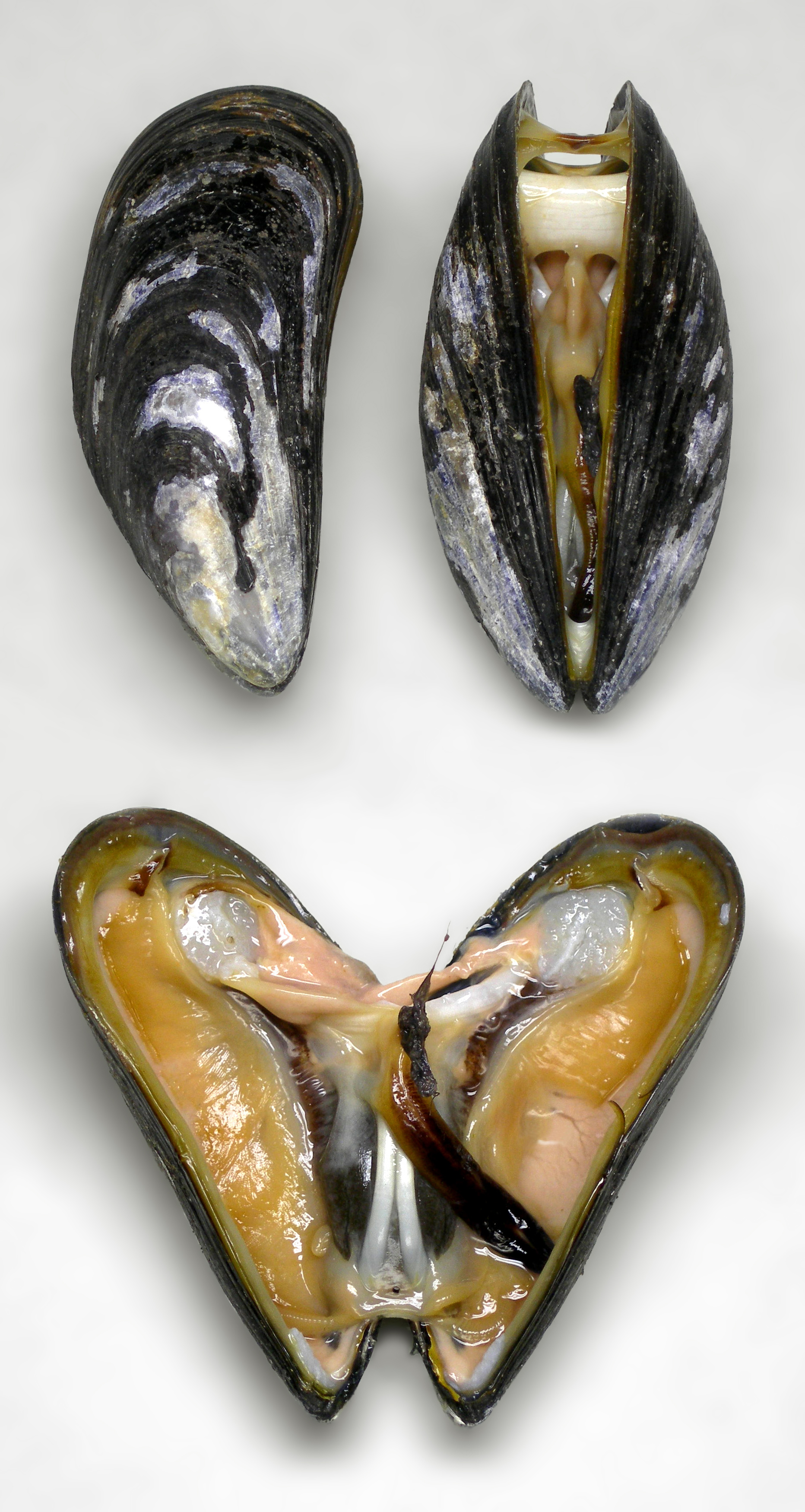

Scientific classification
- Kingdom: Animalia
- Phylum: Mollusca
- Class: Bivalvia
- Order: Mytilida
- Family: Mytilidae
- Genus: Mytilus
- Species: M. edulis

Binomial name
- Mytilus edulis Linnaeus, 1758

= Blue mussel =

Species of mollusc

The blue mussel (Mytilus edulis), also known as the common mussel, is a medium-sized edible marine bivalve mollusc in the family Mytilidae, the only extant family in the order Mytilida, known as "true mussels". Blue mussels are subject to commercial use and intensive aquaculture. A species with a large range, the blue mussel leaves empty shells that are commonly found on beaches around the world.

== Systematics and distribution ==
=== The Mytilus edulis complex ===
Systematically blue mussel consists of a group of (at least) three closely related taxa of mussels, known as the Mytilus edulis complex. Collectively they occupy both coasts of the North Atlantic (including the Mediterranean) and of the North Pacific in temperate to polar waters, as well as coasts of similar nature in the Southern Hemisphere. The distribution of the component taxa has been recently modified as a result of human activity. The taxa can hybridise with each other, if present at the same locality.

- Mytilus edulis sensu stricto: Native to the North Atlantic.
- Mytilus galloprovincialis, the Mediterranean mussel: Native in the Mediterranean, the Black Sea and Western Europe. Introduced in the temperate North Pacific, South Africa and elsewhere in the Southern Hemisphere.
- Mytilus planulatus, the New Zealand blue mussel, a distinct lineage native to the Southern Hemisphere along the southern coast of Australia, Tasmania and New Zealand.
- Mytilus platensis (junior synonym M. chilensis), the Chilean mussel: Temperate and sub-Antarctic waters of South America and the Kerguelen Islands.
- Mytilus trossulus: North Pacific, northern parts of the North Atlantic, Baltic Sea.

=== Mytilus edulis, strict sense ===
The Atlantic blue mussel is native on the North American Atlantic coast, but is found intermixed with M. trossulus north of Maine. In Atlantic Canada, M. trossulus was found to have smaller shell growth values than M. edulis and contain less meat than M. edulis. Keeping this in mind, M. edulis, under raft culture conditions, is estimated to have an economic value of 1.7 times M. trossulus. In Europe it is found from French Atlantic coast northwards to Novaya Zemlya and Iceland, but not in the Baltic Sea. In France and in the British Isles, it makes hybrid zones with M. galloprovincialis, and also is sometimes intermixed with M. trossulus.

The genetically distinct lineage of M. edulis present in the Southern Hemisphere has been attributed to subspecies Mytilus edulis platensis (now Mytilus platensis).

== Habitat ==
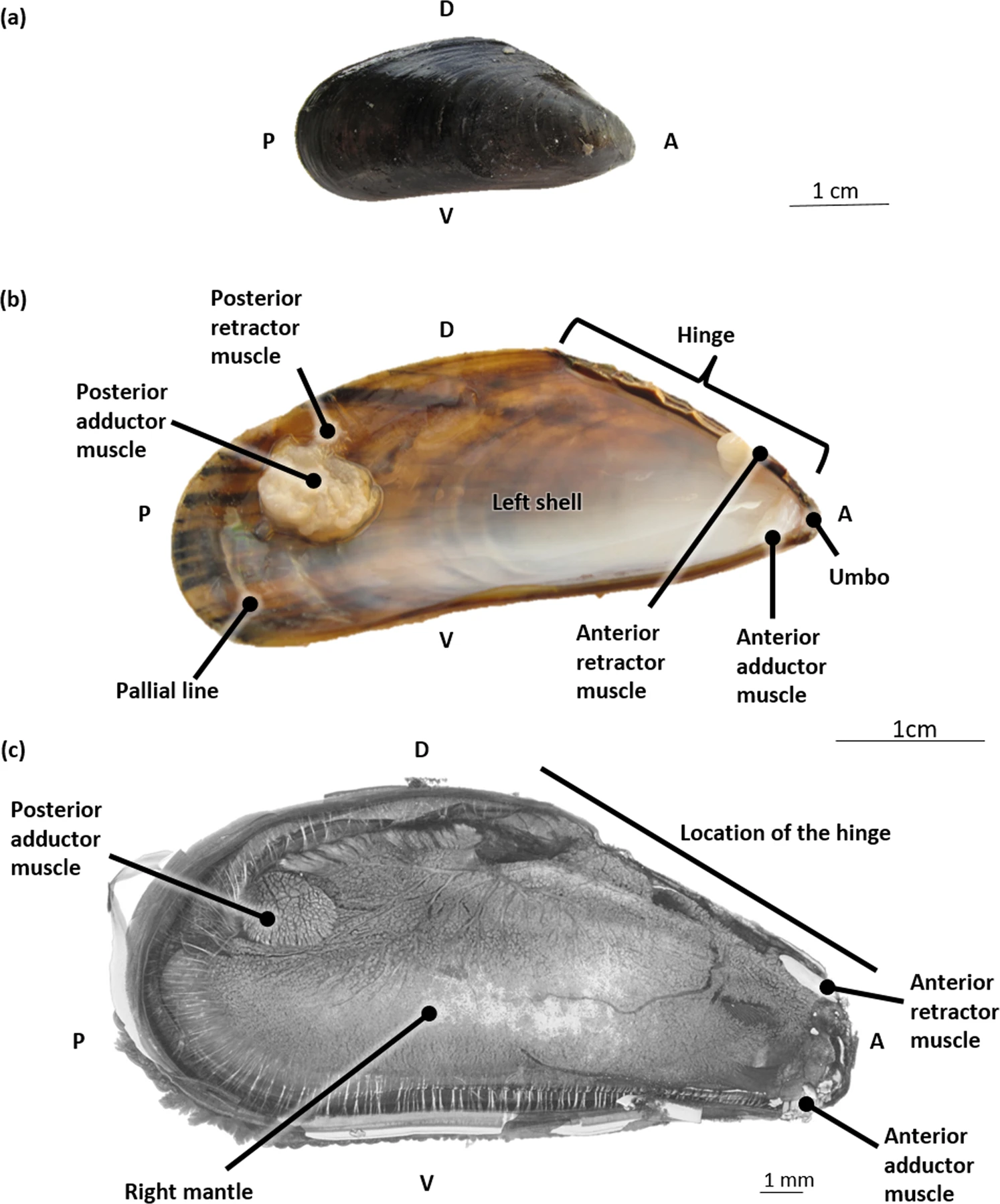
Orientation terminology (a) The outside of the right shell (b) The inside of the left shell (c) Without shells, right lateral overview generated from a micro-CT scan D, Dorsal; V, Ventral; A, Anterior; P, Posterior

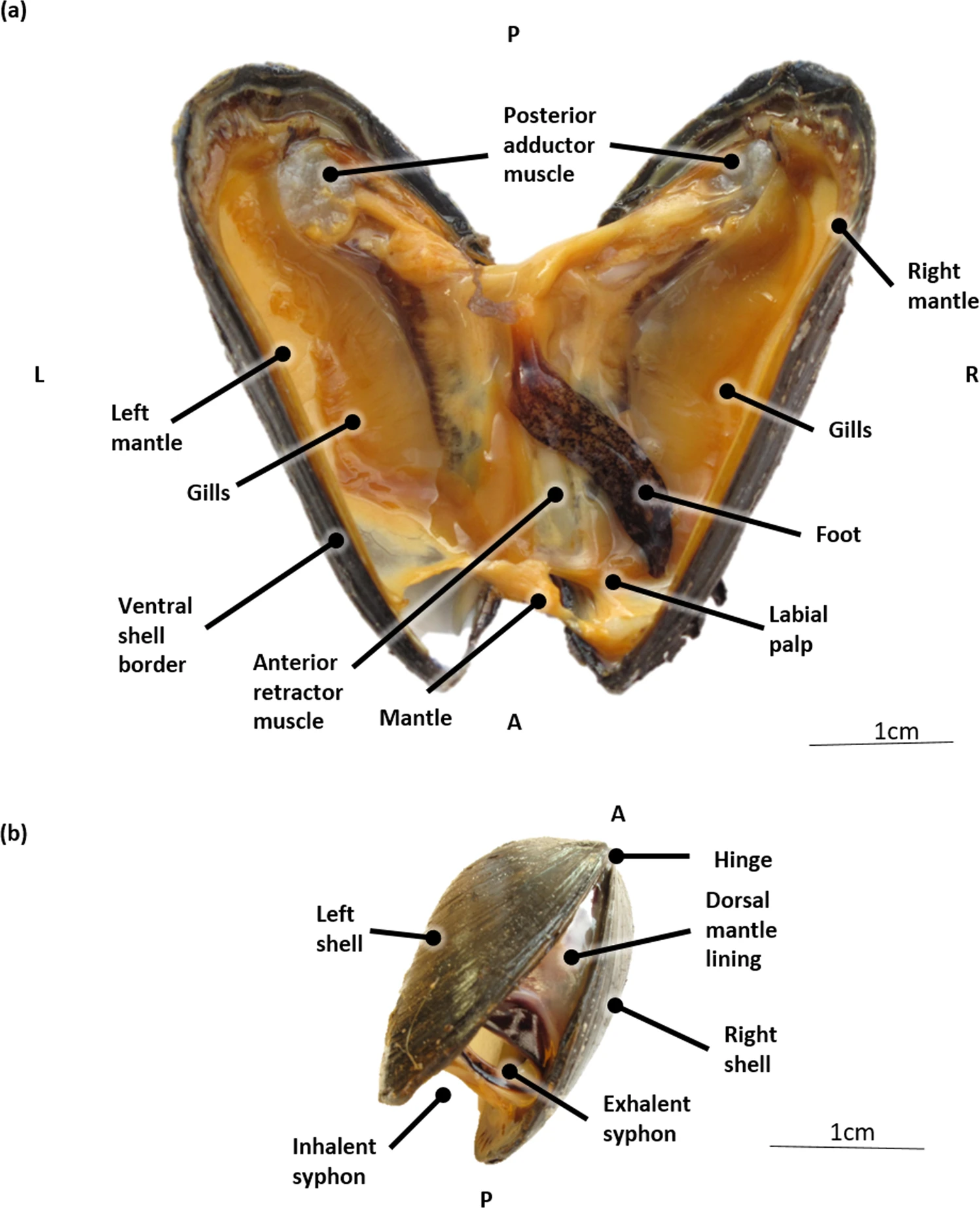
General anatomy of the tissues (a) Ventral view after cutting the adductor muscles and forcing the valves to open, hereby rupturing the connecting mantle parts (b) Oblique dorsal view on a sedated specimen L, Left; R, Right; P, Posterior; A, Anterior

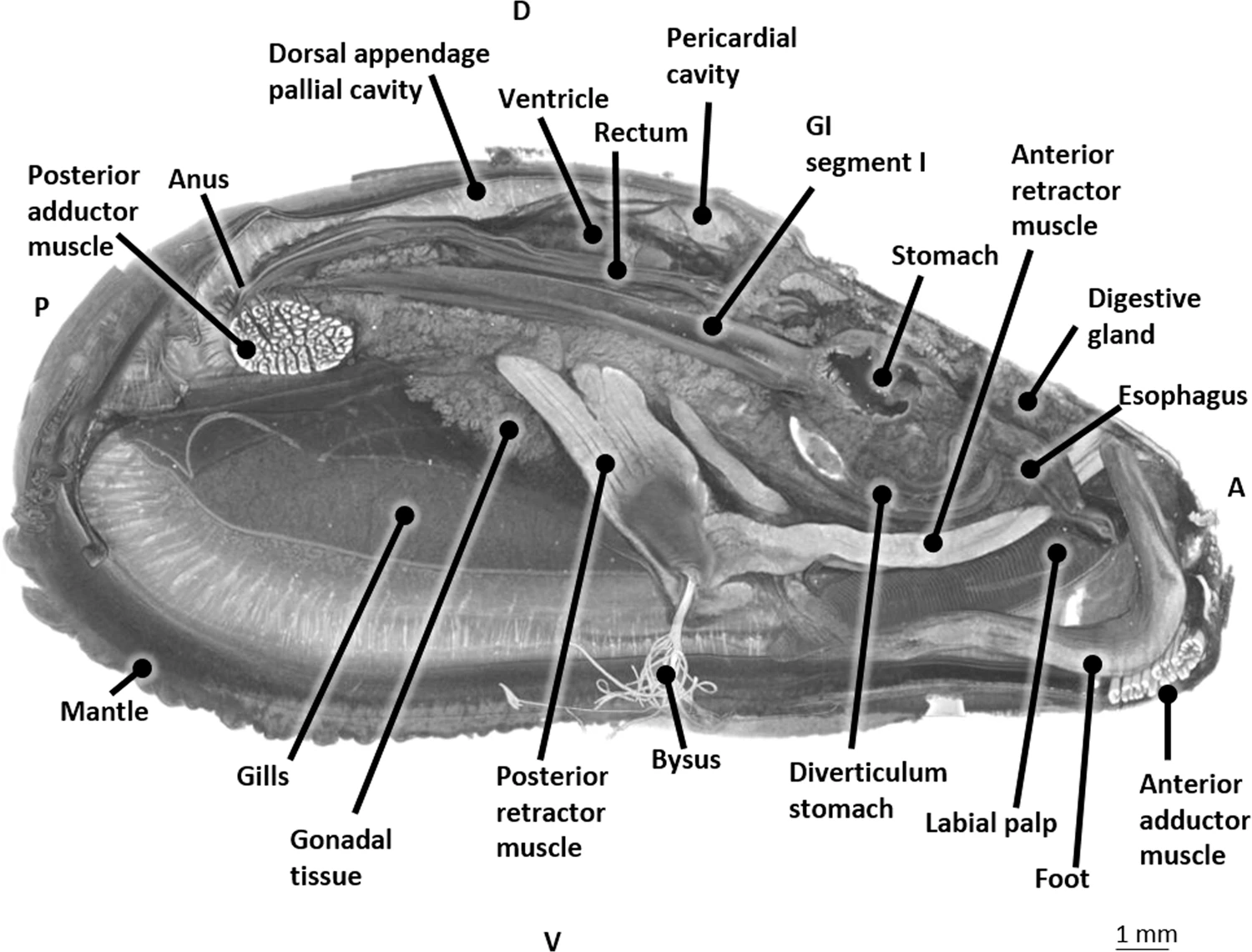
Internal anatomy Longitudinal micro-CT section in 3D at the level of the heart of a critical point dried blue mussel after Bouin fixation. GI, Gastro-intestinal; D, Dorsal; V, Ventral; P, Posterior; A, Anterior

Blue mussels are boreo-temperate invertebrates that live in intertidal areas attached to rocks and other hard substrates by strong (and somewhat elastic) thread-like structures called byssal threads, secreted by byssal glands located in the foot of the mussel.

== Description ==
The shape of the shell is triangular and elongated with rounded edges. The shell is smooth with a sculpturing of fine concentric growth lines but no radiating ribs. The shells of this species are purple, blue or sometimes brown in color, occasionally with radial stripes. The outer surface of the shell is covered by the periostracum which as eroded, exposes the colored prismatic calcitic layer. Blue mussels are semi-sessile, having the ability to detach and reattach to a surface allowing the mollusk to reposition itself relative to the water position.

Right and left valve of the same specimen:

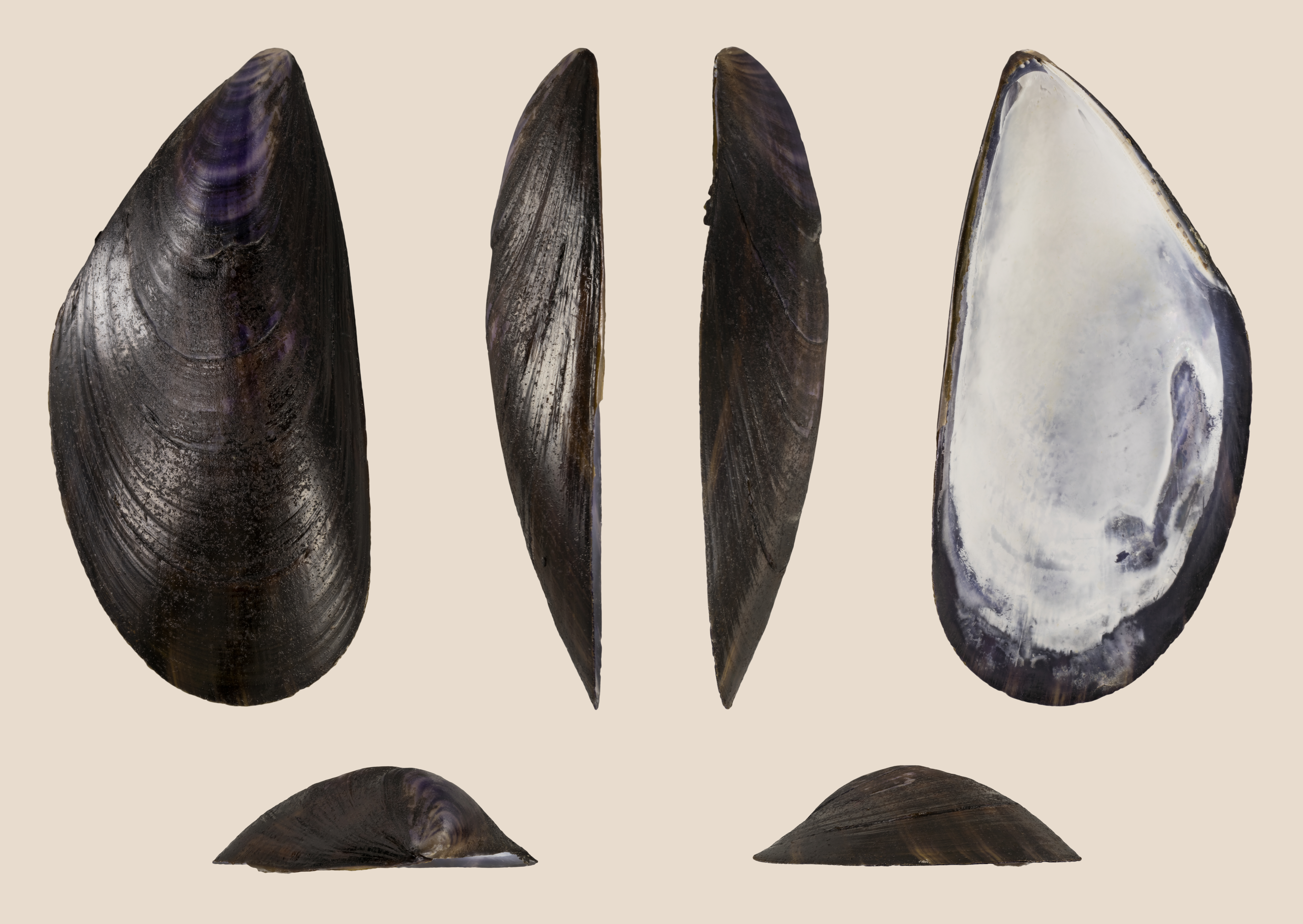
Right valve

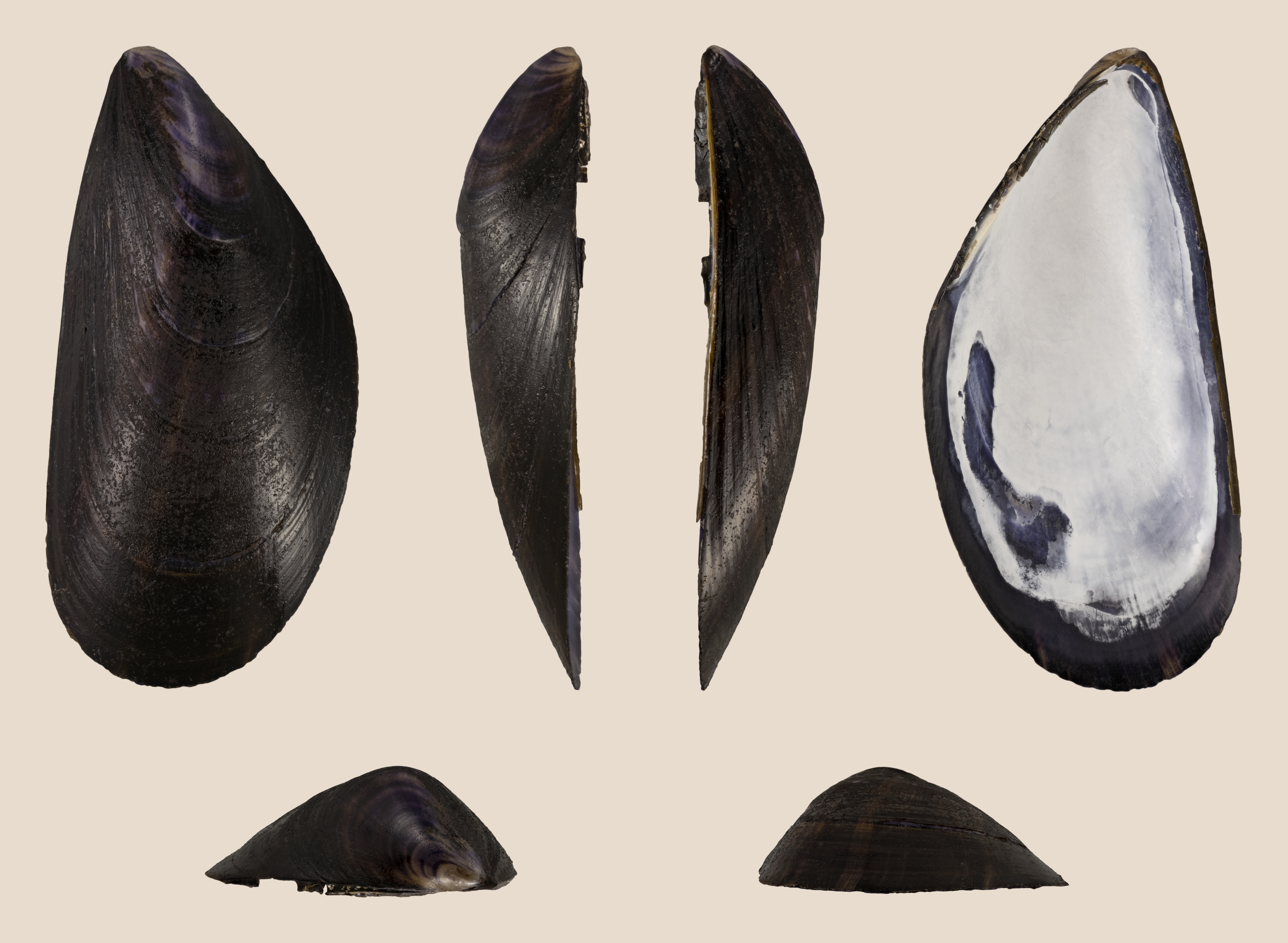
Left valve

var. flavida

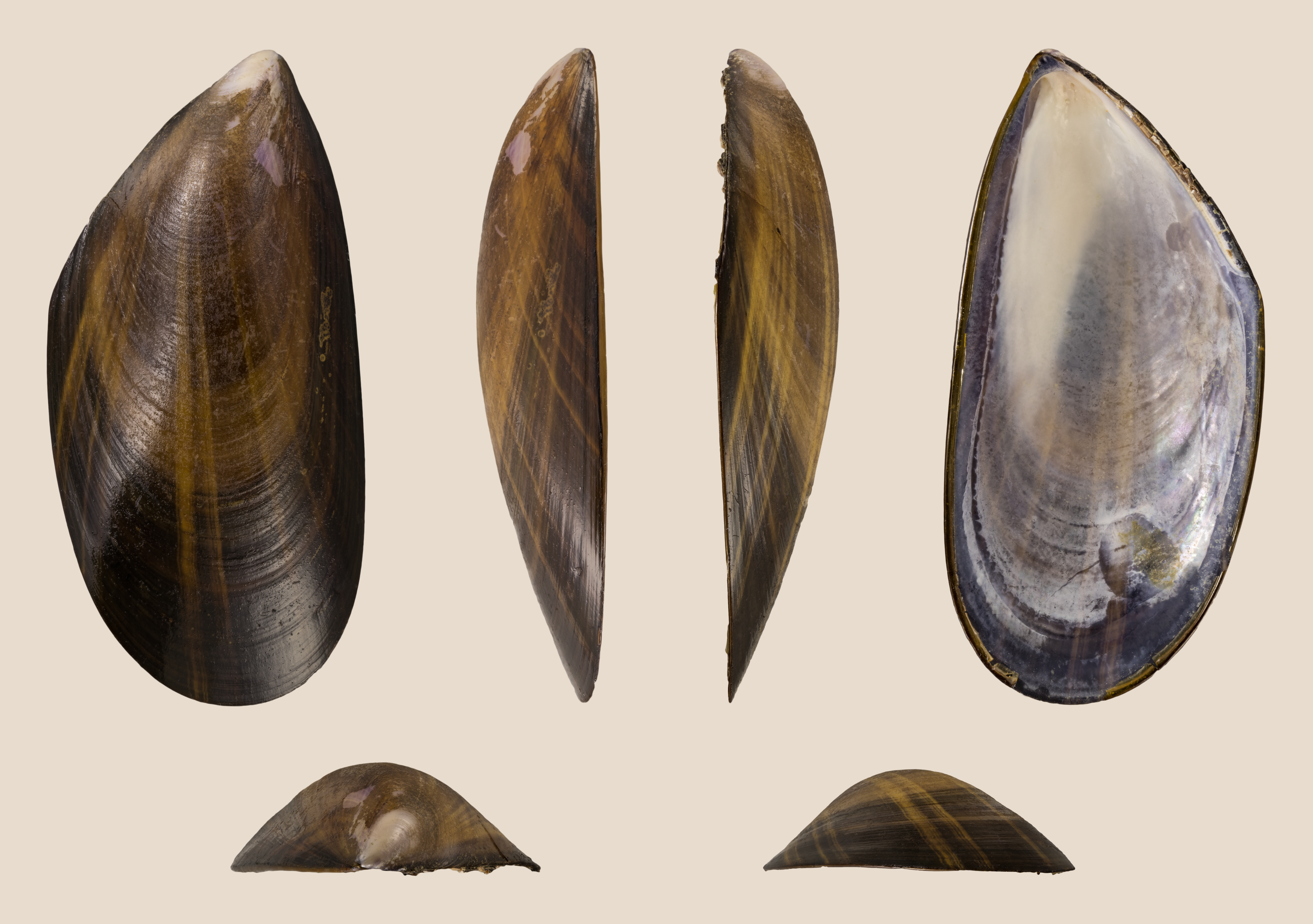
Right valve

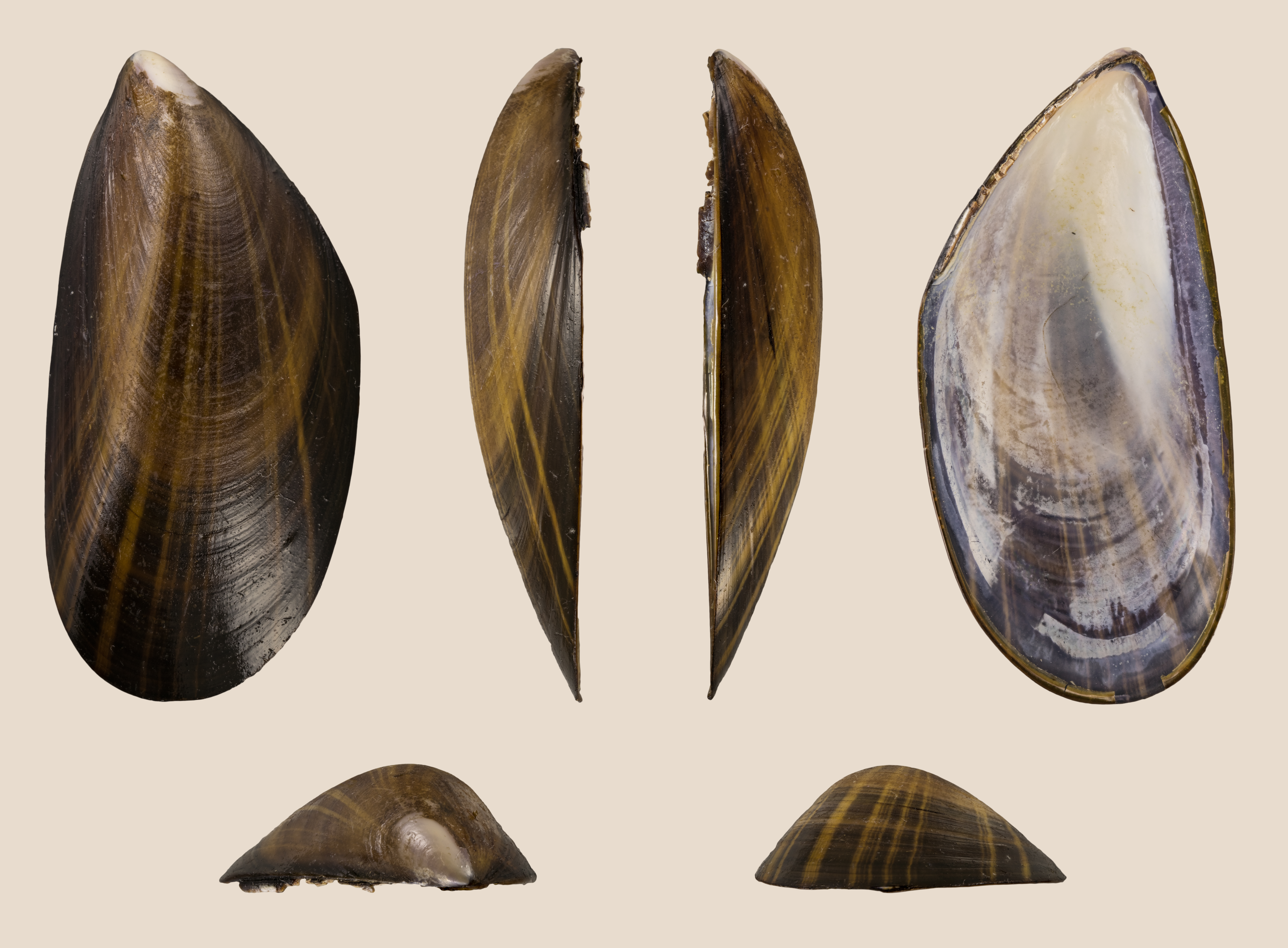
Left valve

== Reproduction ==
Mussels have separate sexes. Once the sperm and eggs are fully developed they are released into the water column for fertilization. Although there are about 10,000 sperm per egg, large proportions of eggs deposited by blue mussels are never fertilized. As few as 1% of larvae that do mature ever reach adulthood. The majority are eaten by predators before completing metamorphosis.

The reproductive strategy seen in blue mussels is characteristic of planktotrophs. By minimizing nutrients in egg production to the bare minimum they are able to maximize the number of gametes produced. If the adult mussels are stressed during the beginning of gametogenesis, the process is terminated. When stressed while fresh gametes are present, adult mussels reabsorb gametes. Larvae viability is also affected by the condition of parents: high water temperatures, pollutants and scarcity of food, during gamete production. The reduction in viability is probably due to the lack of lipid reserves distributed to the eggs.

== Monitor of environmental DNA damage ==
Blue mussels are used for monitoring marine pollution based on their tendency to accumulate numerous pollutants from their natural environment. Upon in vivo exposure of blue mussels (Mytilus edulis) to either of two metals of environmental concern, cadmium or chromium, it was found that both of these metals induce DNA strand breakage, and also impair different DNA repair capacities in the tissues of these mussels.

== Larval development ==
Larval development can last from 15 to 35 days depending environmental conditions including salinity and temperature, as well as location. Larvae originating from Connecticut mature normally at 15–20 °C (59–68 °F), though at 15 °C (59 °F) normal development occurs at salinities between 15 and 35 ppt and at 35 ppt at 20 °C (68 °F).

The first stage of development is the ciliated embryo, which in 24-hours for fertilization form the trochophore. At this point although mobile, it is still reliant on the yolk for nutrients. Characterized by a functional mouth and alimentary canal the veliger stage also has cilia which are used for filtering food as well as propulsion. A thin translucent shell is secreted by the shell gland forming the notable straight hinge of the prodissoconch I shell. The veliger continues to mature forming the prodissoconch II shell. In the end stage of veliger development photosensitive eye spots and elongated foot with a byssal gland are formed.

Once the pediveliger is fully developed, its foot extends and makes contact with substrate. The initial contact with the substrate is loose. If the substrate is suitable, the larva will metamorphoses into the juvenile form, plantigrade, and attach byssus threads. The mussel will remain in that state until reaching 1-1.5mm in length. This attachment is the prerequisite for the foundation for the blue mussel population. In sheltered environments large masses sometimes form beds which offer shelter and food for other invertebrates. Byssal thread are secreted by byssal glands located in the foot of the mussel, and are made up of polyphenolic proteins which serve as a bioadhesive.

== Aggregation and mussel bed formation ==
Blue mussels often form aggregations, where they attach to each other using byssus threads. These are collagenous protein strands used for attachment. The type of aggregation depends on population densities. When densities are low, for example in mussel fields – short-lived mussel populations – clumped distribution patterns are seen. The rate of aggregation is aided by the presence of predator cues.

Several explanations for aggregate formation have been offered, such as increase of reproductive success in low density populations, resisting of wave action, and defence against predators. It is, however, still unclear what the main purpose is and aggregation might have different purposes under different circumstances.

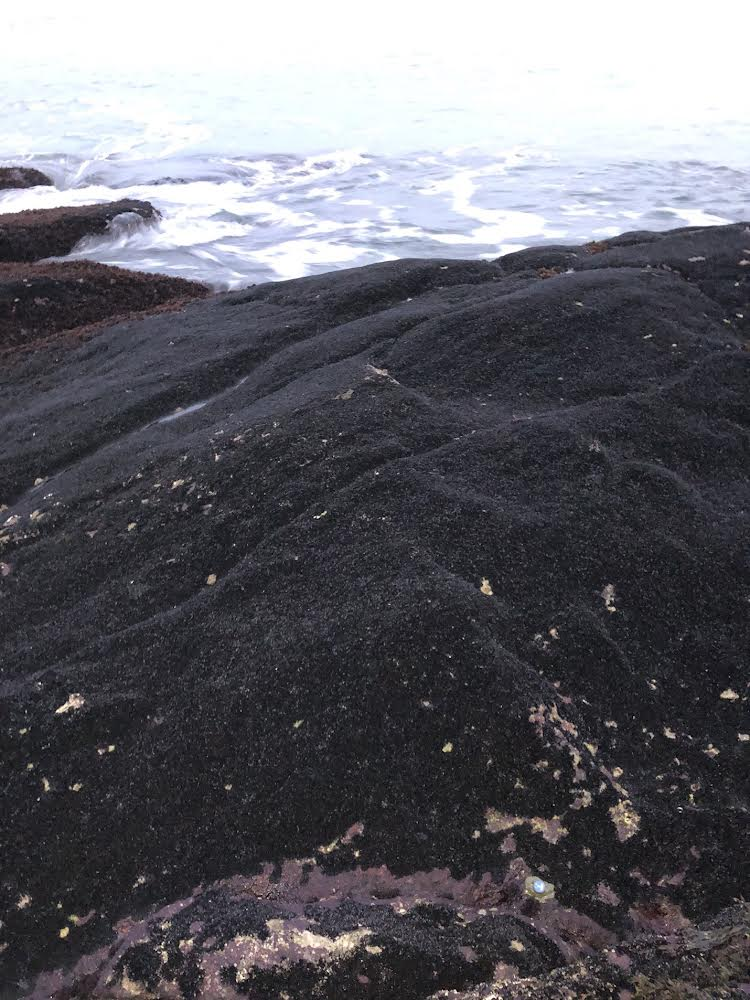
Mussel bed in Rhode Island, USA

Mussel beds are persistent, dense mussel populations. Beds generally form from fields that persist long enough to establish a dense population. In high density aggregations, growth of blue mussels at the centre of the aggregation is reduced, likely due to a reduction in food availability. When possible, mussels will thus migrate to lower densities on larger scales (>7.5 cm), but aggregate on small scales (<2.0 cm). In areas where blue mussels are threatened, such as the Wadden Sea, it is of great importance to enhance the survival of mussel fields, of which mussel aggregates are the primary component.

== Predators ==
Predation of blue mussels is greatest during the three weeks it spends as a planktonic larva. During this stage it is susceptible to jellyfish and fish larvae through adults. Once it metamorphoses the mussel is still restricted by predation, with smaller mussels with thinner, weaker shells most affected. Once the shells becomes stronger, blue mussels are preyed upon by sea stars such as Asterias vulgaris as well as by several species of sea gulls. The capability of shell thickening by mussels has become a very effective defense mechanism. In the presence of predators a mussel is able to increase shell thickness 5 to 10 percent, which in turn makes opening the shell take 50 percent more time. Small mussels are also eaten by the dog whelk, Nucella lapillus. The blue mussel is host to a wide range of parasites, but these parasites usually do not cause much damage. Blue Mussels are able to fight off one species of predator at a time such as sea star (Asterias rubens (=Asterias vulgaris)) or green crabs (Carcinus maenas). They use their inducible defenses to strengthen their adductor muscle or grow thicker shells. When faced with two species at a time, they are no longer able to use their defenses and can be killed more easily.

== Uses and ecosystem services ==
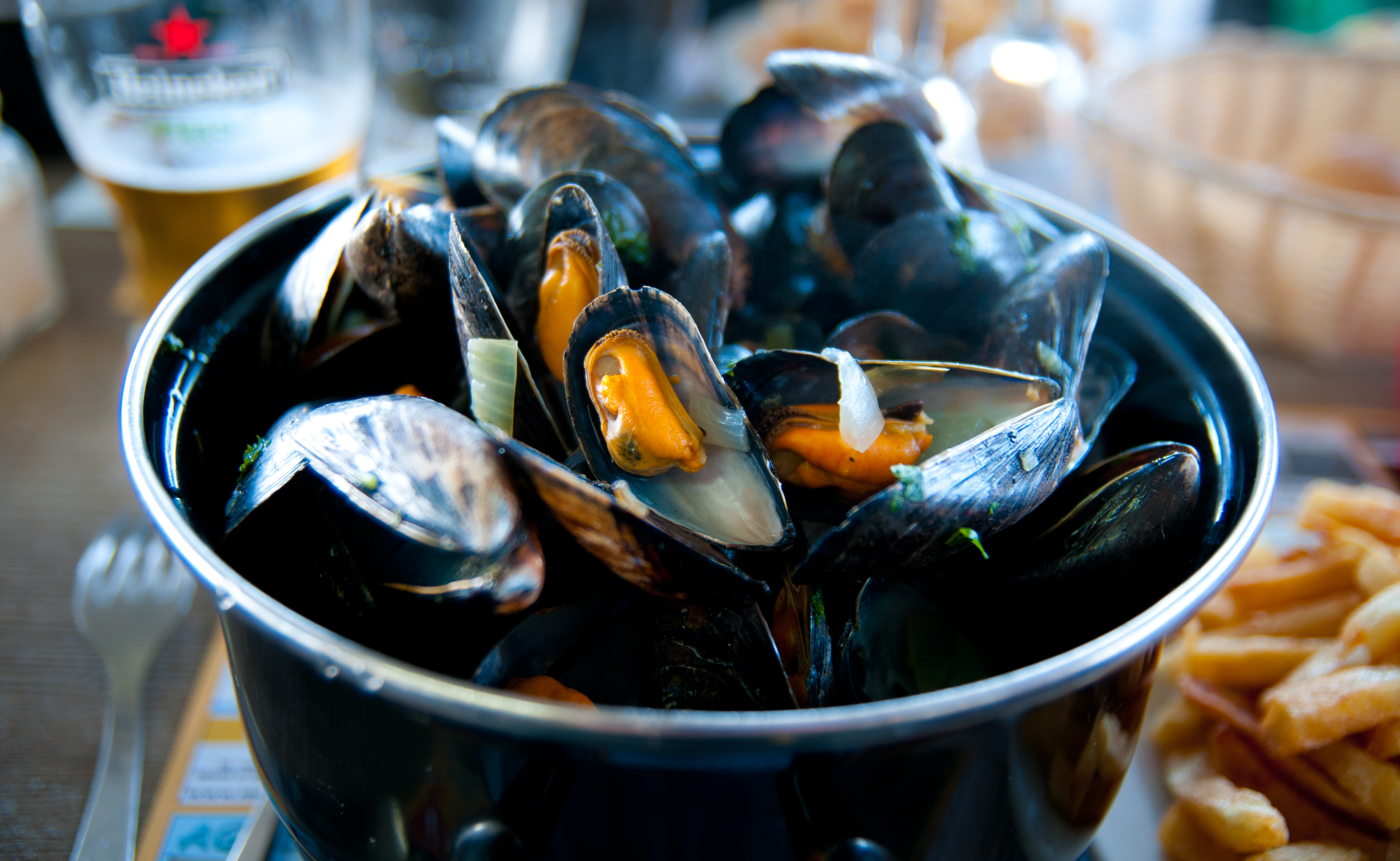
Boiled blue mussels in Normandy, France

Capture (blue) and aquaculture (green) production of Blue mussel (Mytilus edulis) in thousand tonnes from 1950 to 2022, as reported by the FAO

Blue mussels are filter feeders and play a vital role in estuaries by removing bacteria and toxins. Mytilus edulis is commonly harvested for food throughout the world, from both wild and farmed sources. Mussels are a staple of many seafood dishes in various cuisines including Spanish (especially Galician), Portuguese, French, British, Dutch, Belgian, Italian and Turkey as midye dolma. They are also commonly used as lab animals. Blue mussels were also harvested by the indigenous peoples of North America.

Blue mussels are starting to decline in areas such as the Gulf of Maine. Historical references have shown a decrease of about 40 percent in the last fifty years. This can cause a future problem because mussels are foundation species providing homes and protecting other small animals in the intertidal zone like small fish as well as filtering the water. Mussels filter out bacteria, metals, and toxins, that would increase significantly without mussels around. Ocean acidification due to increasing atmospheric carbon dioxide is projected to reduce the growth and survival of blue mussels; in turn, this could drastically reduce their positive impact on coastal water quality.

== Gallery ==
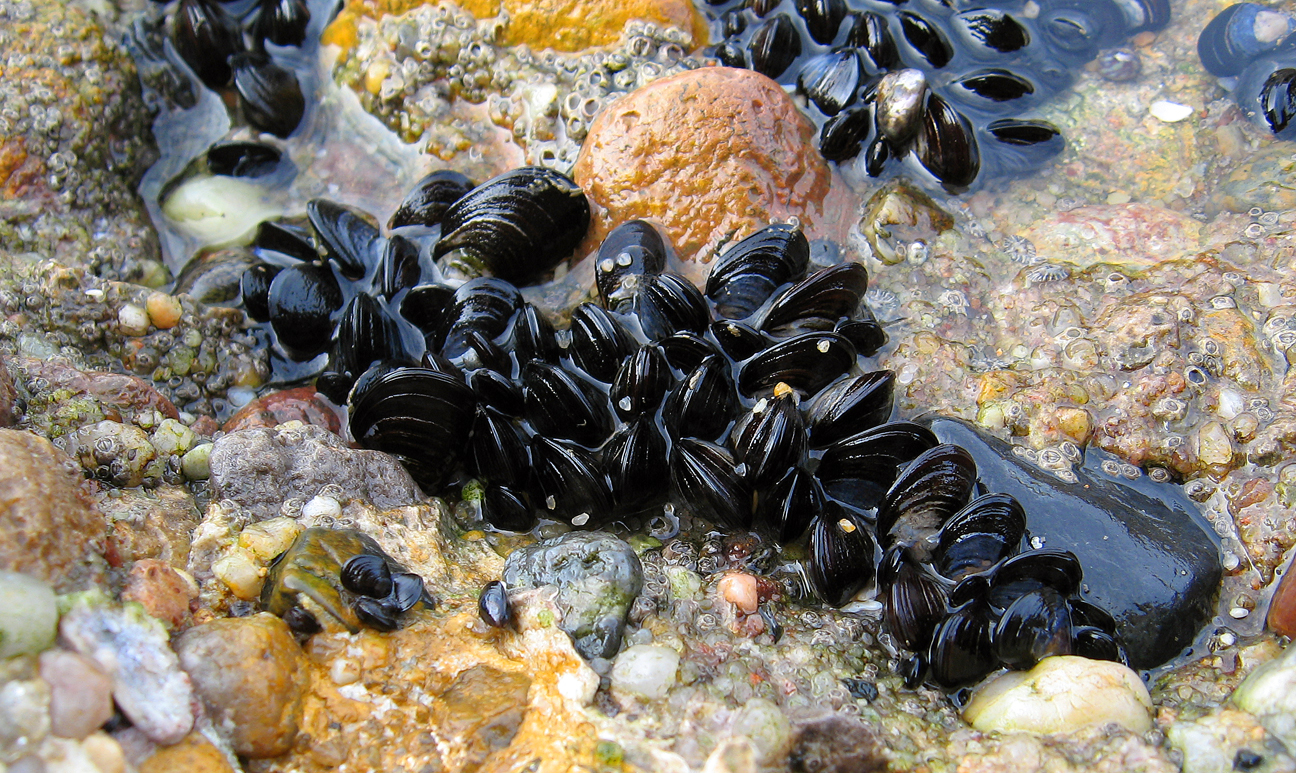
Live blue mussels on a rocky substrate

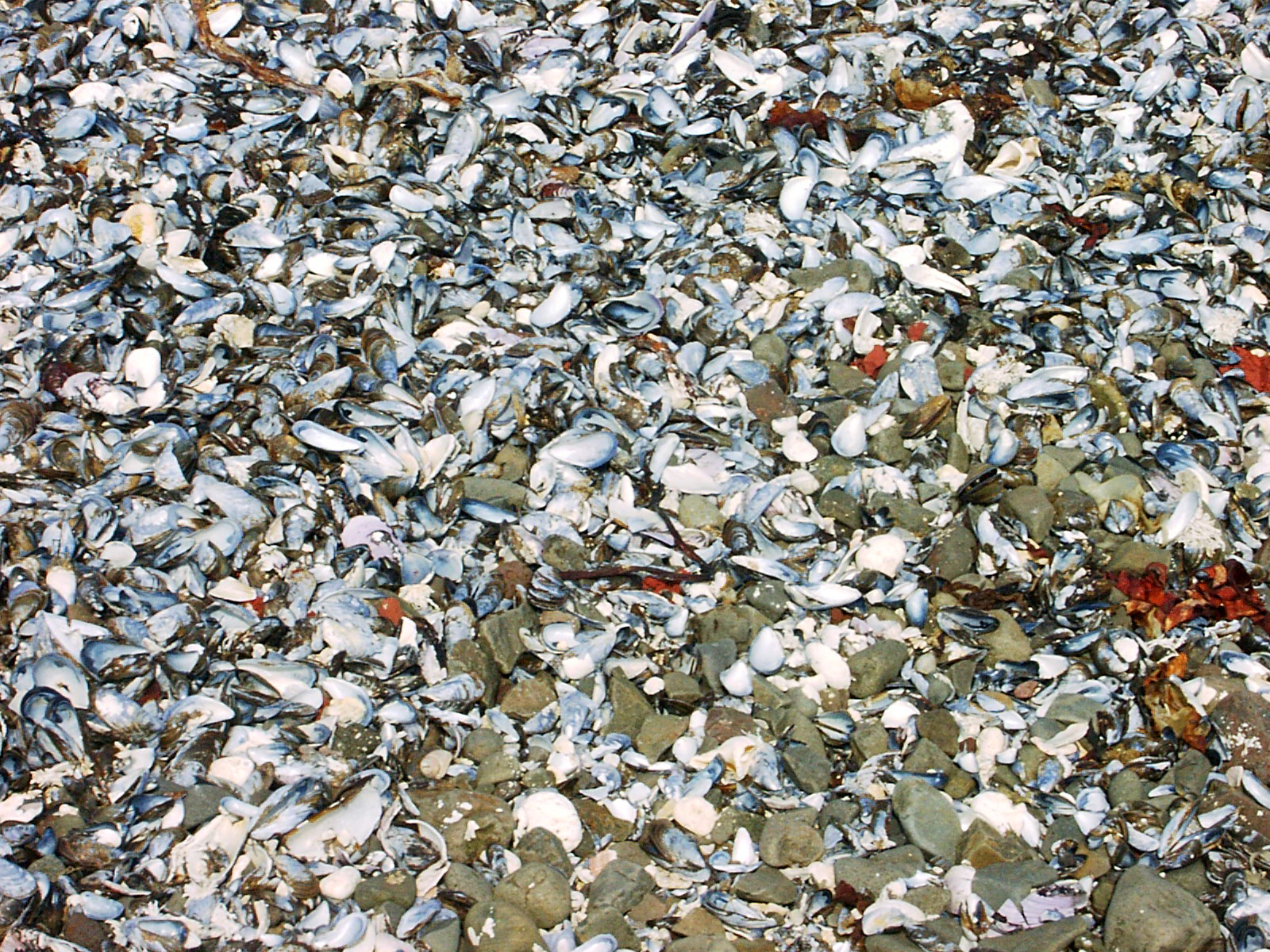
Numerous empty blue mussel shells on a beach in Iceland

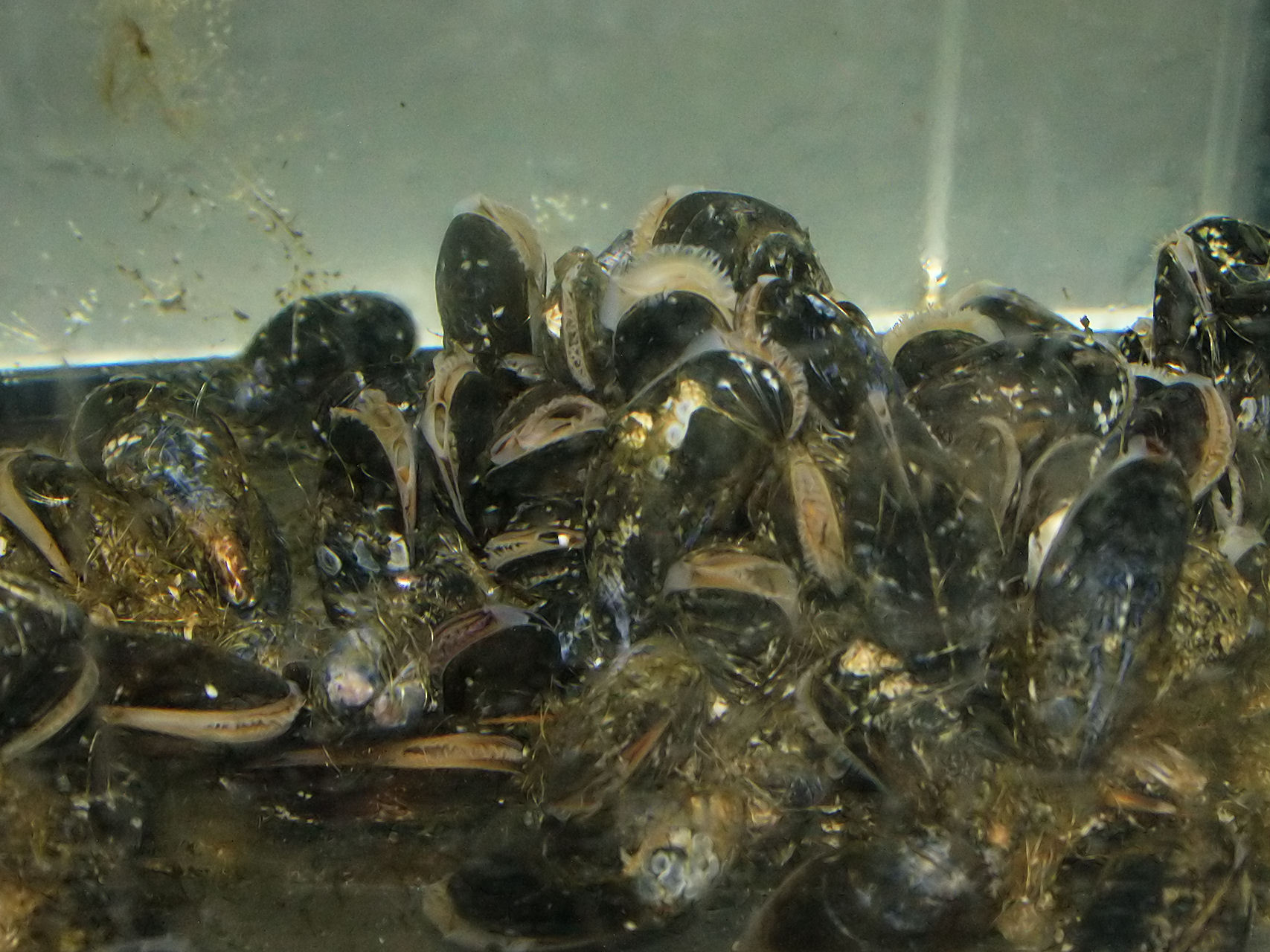
Live blue mussels

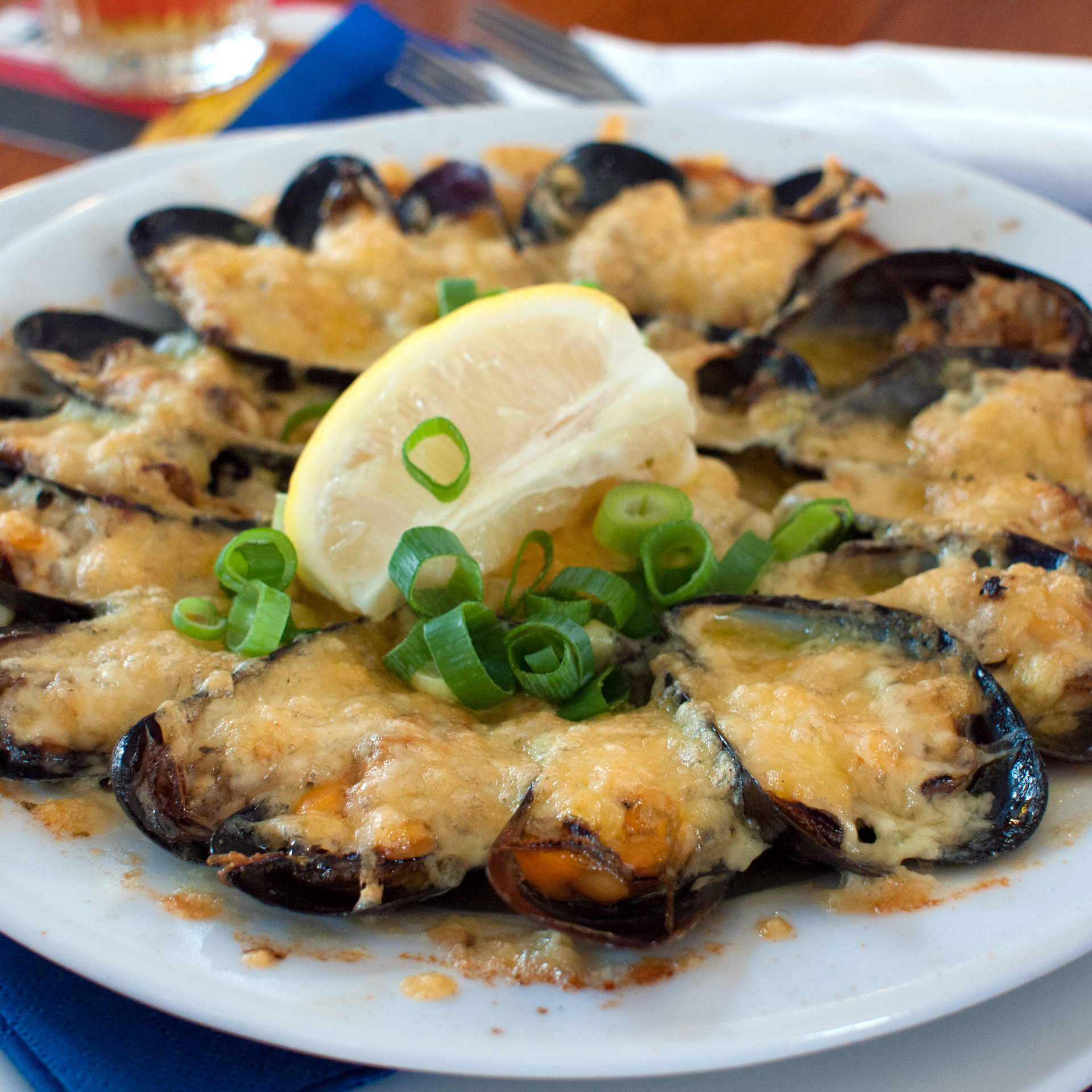
Mussels and cheese gratin

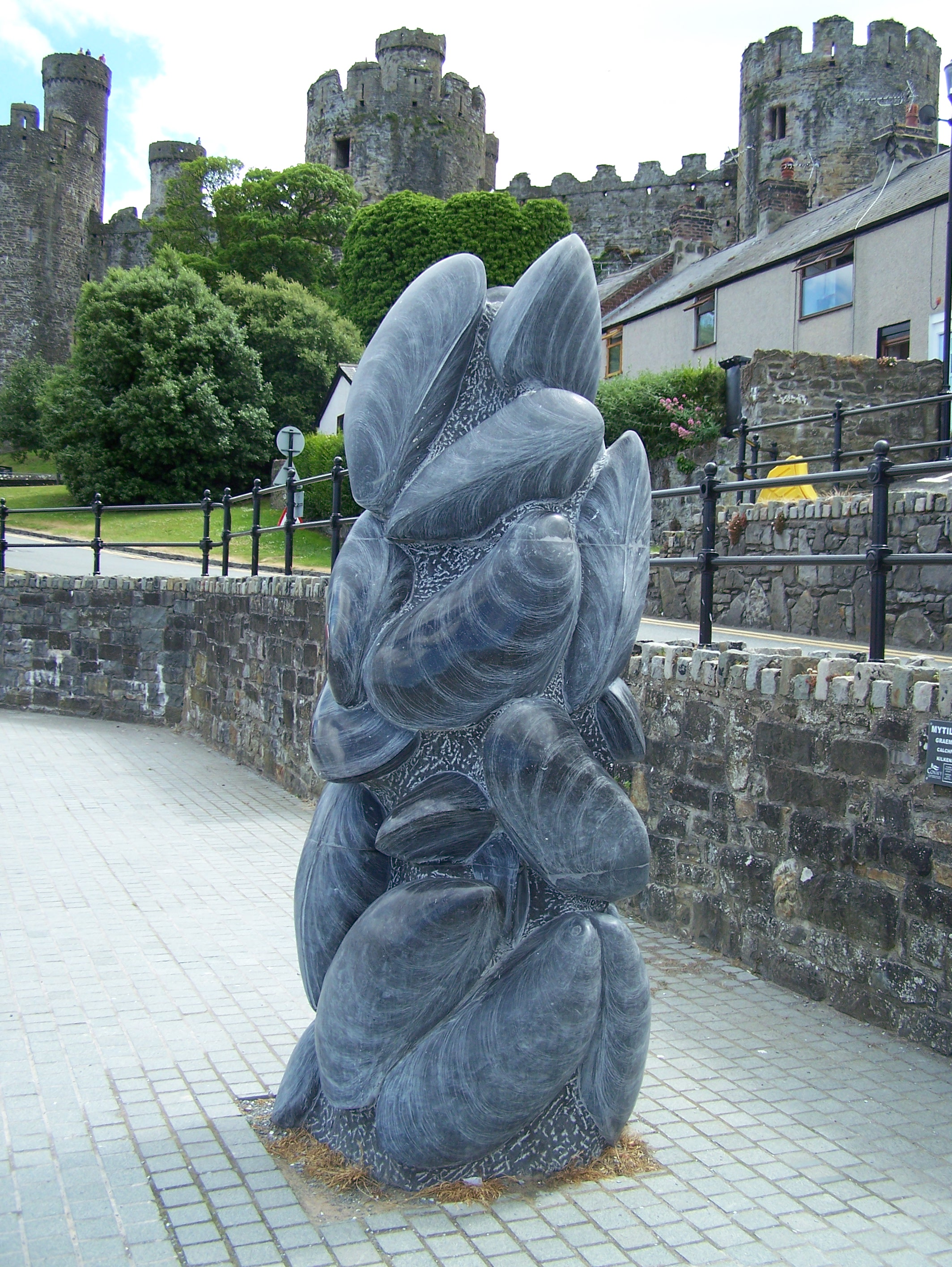
Blue mussel sculpture at Conwy, North Wales near Conwy Castle
