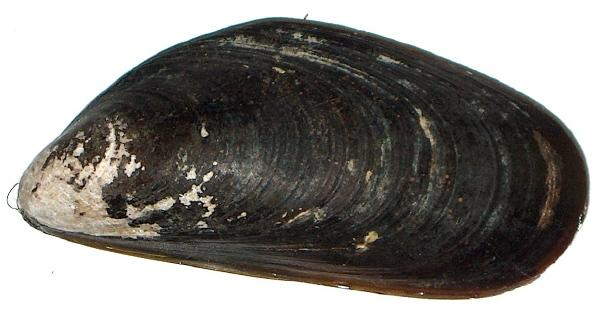

Scientific classification
- Kingdom: Animalia
- Phylum: Mollusca
- Class: Bivalvia
- Order: Mytilida
- Family: Mytilidae
- Genus: Mytilus
- Species: M. chilensis

Binomial name
- Mytilus chilensis Hupé, 1854

Synonyms
- Mytilus chiloensis Reeve, 1858

= Chilean mussel =

Species of bivalve

The Chilean mussel or Chilean blue mussel, Mytilus chilensis, is a species of blue mussel native to the coasts of Chile from Biobío Region (37 ºS) to Cape Horn (55 ºS). Genomic evidence has confirmed that the native Chilean blue mussel is genetically distinct from the Northern Hemisphere M. edulis, M. galloprovincialis and M. trossulus and also genetically different from Mytilus platensis, the other species of smooth shelled mussel from South America.

Right and left valve of the same specimen:

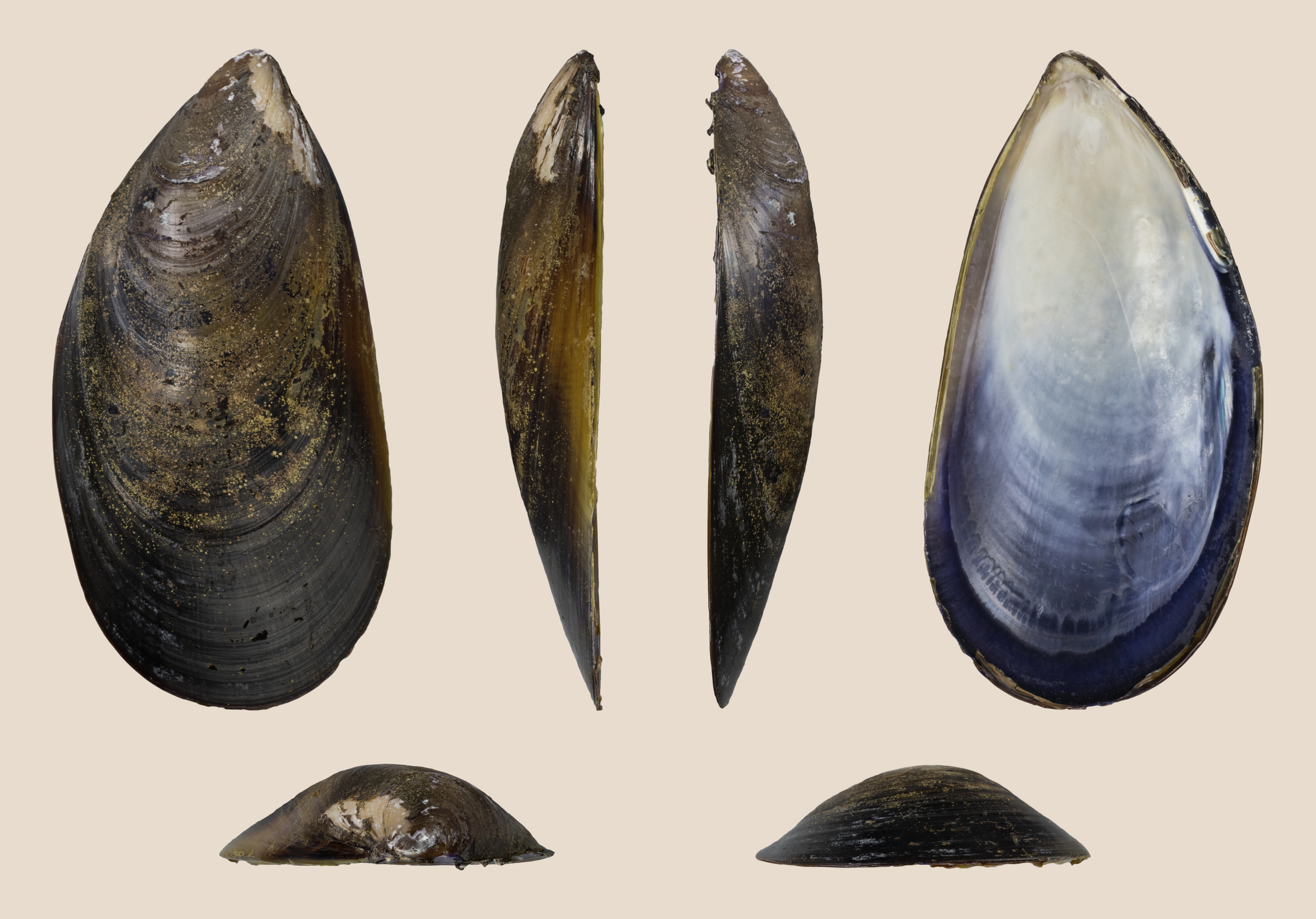
Right valve

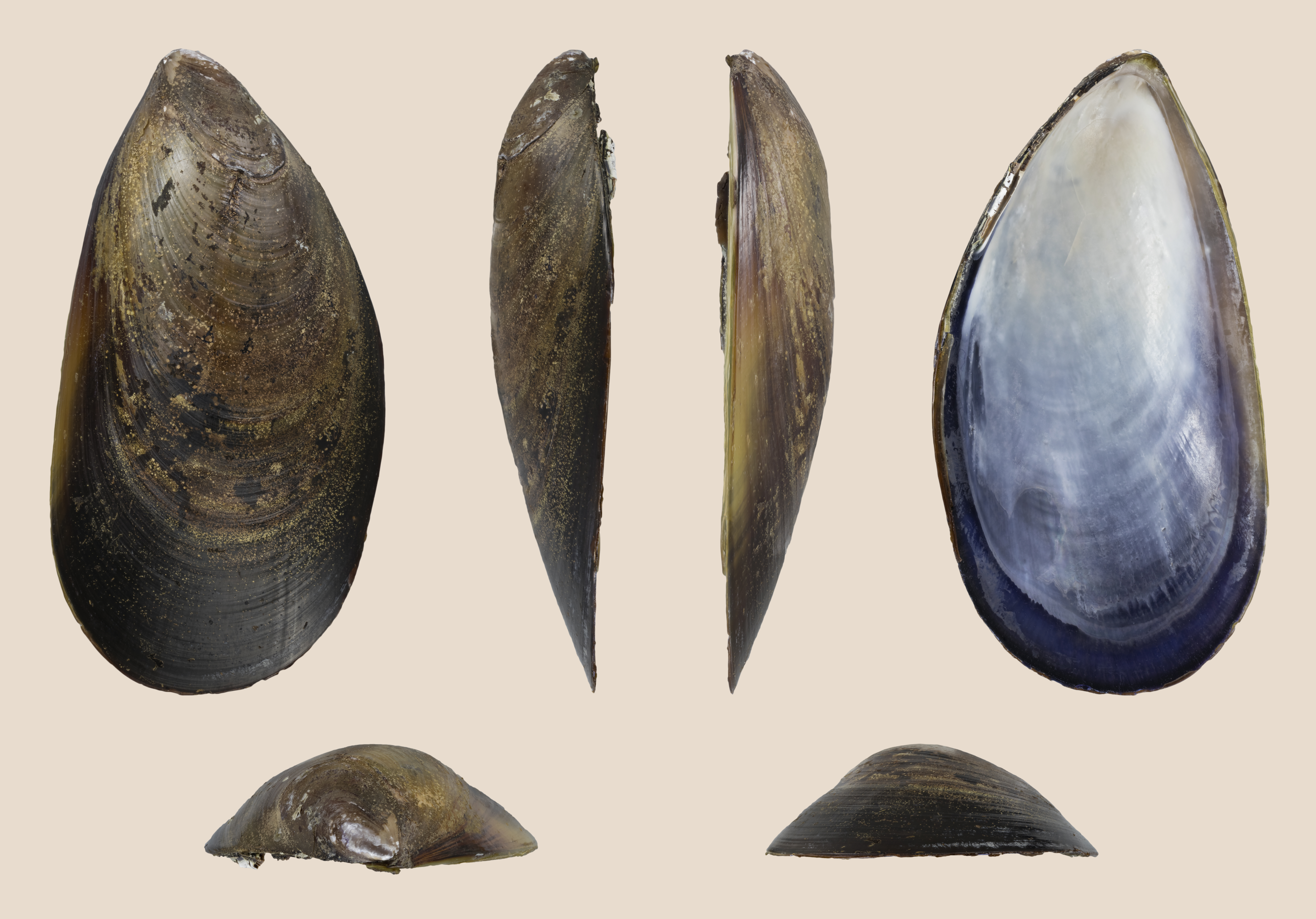
Left valve

== Aquaculture ==
Capture (blue) and aquaculture (green) production of Chilean mussel (Mytilus chilensis) in thousand tonnes from 1950 to 2022, as reported by the FAO

M. chilensis is under intensive aquaculture in Chile. From 2004 to 2008 the annual commercial harvest increased from 80,000 to 200,000 tonnes. Following a decrease in 2009, the production was back at high level in 2010. Over 45,000 tonnes of mussels were exported from Chile in 2008, 93% of them frozen. Some 74% of exports are to the EU, primarily Spain and France, and 15% to the United States.

== Systematics ==
Alcide d'Orbigny first described the species Mytilus platensis d'Orbigny, 1842,. Species that was for many year erroneously confused with Mytilus chilensis described by Hipolito Hupé in 1854. Nowadays most biodiversity databases, such as the World Register of Marine Species or the Integrated Taxonomic Information System recognise Mytilus chilensis as a valid taxon in the Mytilus genus and different from Mytilus platensis. Mytilus chilensis is part of the worldwide Mytilus edulis complex of mussels, or blue mussels. Modern genetic studies based on single-nucleotide polymorphism (SNP) have demonstrated that the Chilean mussel is genetically different of both the Mediterranean mussel (Mytilus galloprovincialis) and the North Atlantic Mytilus edulis. Evidence collected until 2021 recognized several blue mussel species in South America, including native M. platensis, introduced M. galloprovincialis from the Mediterranean, and possibly-introduced M. planulatus. Using nuclear DNA markers, Borsa et al. (2012) confirmed earlier results from allozymes that most populations in the south of the South American continent indeed represent a native Southern Hemisphere lineage of the blue mussel, for which they suggested to use the subspecies name Mytilus edulis platensis (now M. platensis). The same authors questioned the earlier identifications of the Montevideo mussel in Southern Chile as "M. galloprovincialis" because the genetic markers then used could not help distinguishing M. galloprovincialis from any of the two native blue mussel species from the Southern Hemisphere, now referred to as M. planulatus and M. platensis. Moreover, M. platensis populations in southern Chile show slight introgression from M. planulatus.

== See also ==
- List of marine molluscs of Chile
