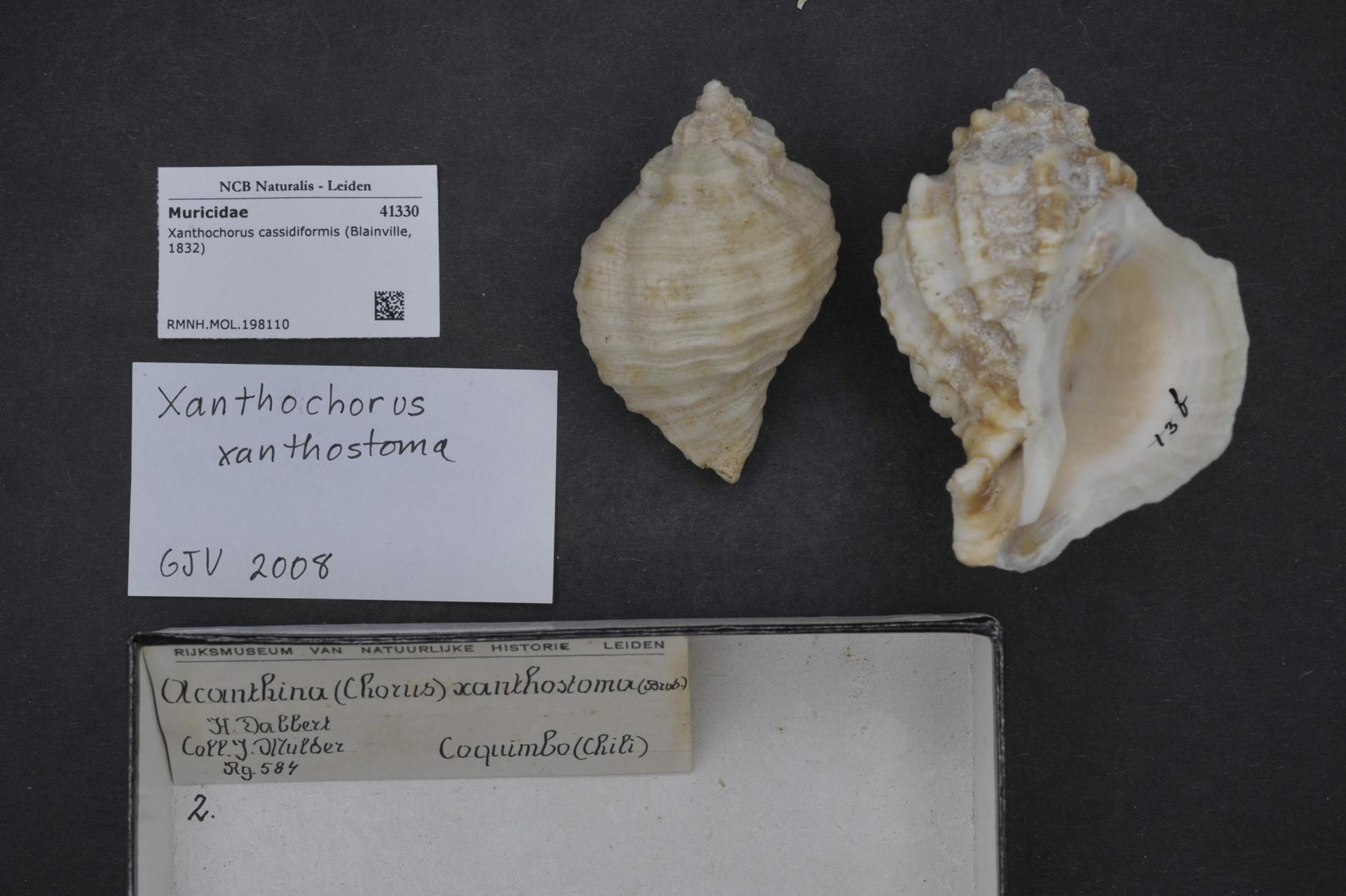
- Xanthochorus cassidiformis

Scientific classification
- Kingdom: Animalia
- Phylum: Mollusca
- Class: Gastropoda
- Subclass: Caenogastropoda
- Order: Neogastropoda
- Family: Muricidae
- Subfamily: Ocenebrinae
- Genus: Xanthochorus; Fischer, 1884

= Xanthochorus =

Genus of gastropods

Xanthochorus is a genus of sea snails, marine gastropod mollusks in the family Muricidae, the murex snails or rock snails.

== Species ==
Species within the genus Xanthochorus include:

- Xanthochorus buxeus (Broderip, 1833)
- Xanthochorus cassidiformis (Blainville, 1832)
