= Thaisella chocolata =

Scientific classification
- Kingdom: Animalia
- Phylum: Mollusca
- Class: Gastropoda
- Subclass: Caenogastropoda
- Order: Neogastropoda
- Superfamily: Muricoidea
- Family: Muricidae
- Subfamily: Rapaninae
- Genus: Thaisella
- Species: T. chocolata

Binomial name
- Thaisella chocolata (Duclos, 1832)

Synonyms
- Purpura chocolata Duclos, 1832; Purpura chocolata Duclos, 1832; Purpura lefevrei Lesson, 1840; Stramonita chocolata (Duclos, 1832); Thais chocolata (Duclos, 1832)

Species of gastropod

Thaisella chocolata is a species of sea snail, a marine gastropod mollusk, in the family Muricidae, the murex snails or rock snails.

== Description ==
The length of the shell attains 77.7 mm.

== Distribution ==
This marine species is endemic to the west coast of South America: (Chile, Ecuador and Peru). The snail is found in the intertidal zone and is quite common on rocky shores, both in sheltered waters and on the open coast.
