= Veliger =

Larval stage of some molluscs

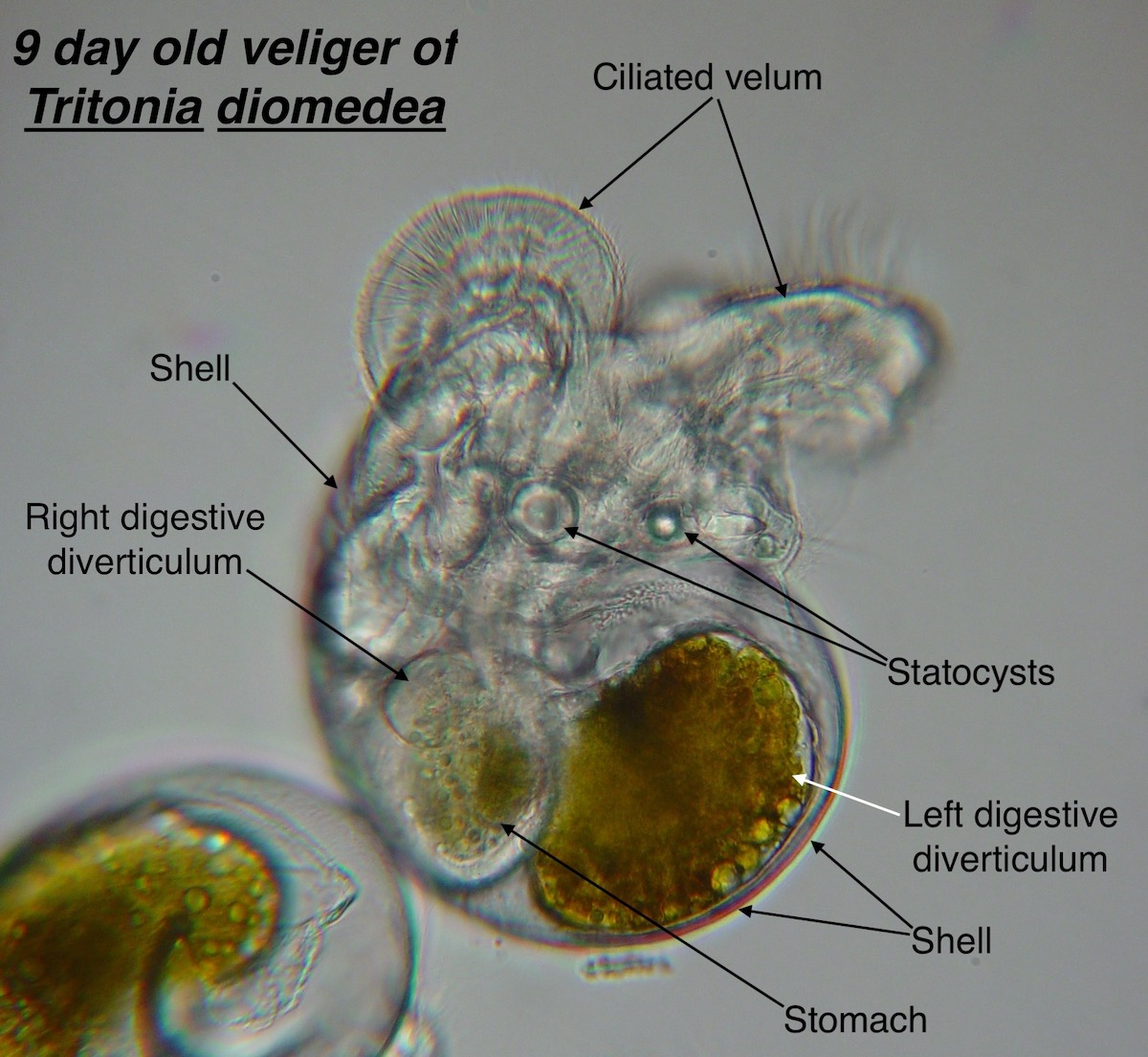
9 day old veliger of the nudibranch Tritonia diomedea with various organs and structures labeled. Larval size about 200 um on its long axis.

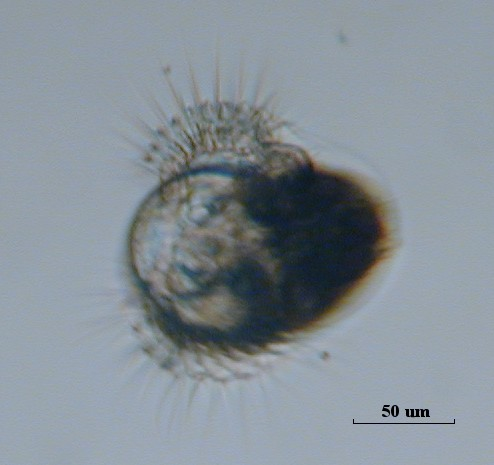
Veliger of sea hare Dolabrifera dolabrifera, with two rows of cilia visible

A veliger is the planktonic larva of many kinds of sea snails and freshwater snails, as well as most bivalve molluscs (clams) and tusk shells.

== Description ==
The veliger is the characteristic larva of the gastropod, bivalve, and scaphopod taxonomic classes. It is produced following either the embryonic or trochophore larval stage of development. In bivalves the veliger is sometimes referred to as a D-stage (early in its development) or pediveliger (late in its development) larva. This stage in the life history of these groups is a free-living planktonic organism; this mode of life potentially enhances dispersal to new regions far removed from the adult mollusks that produced the larvae.

The general structure of the veliger includes a shell that surrounds the visceral organs of the larva (e.g., digestive tract, much of the nervous system, excretory organs) and a ciliated velum that extends beyond the shell as a single or multi-lobed structure used for swimming and particulate food collection: veliger signifies "velum bearer". The larva may have, or may develop, a foot that will be used by the newly settled veliger as it moves about and searches for an appropriate place to metamorphose.

Following metamorphosis, the foot may be used by the juvenile mollusk to move about on the seabed (in gastropods) or in the seabed (in some bivalves). The velum and foot of the veliger can be retracted into the shell to protect these structures from predators or mechanical damage.

== Life cycle ==
Veligers hatch from egg capsules or develop from an earlier, free-swimming trochophore larval stage. In those species where the veliger hatches from an egg capsule, it will pass through the trochophore stage while in the egg capsule.

Veligers mature to a point called "competence" where they settle to the substratum and metamorphose to become the juvenile stage. During metamorphosis they lose their velum, and undergo external and internal changes that produce the juvenile.

Feeding or non-feeding veligers are possible, depending on which species has produced them. In a feeding veliger, the newly hatched larval stage is, in most cases, relatively "undeveloped" and must feed on phytoplankton for weeks to months to develop to the point where it can metamorphose. During the larval period, the veliger grows and develops the organ systems needed for the benthic life of a juvenile. "Non-feeding" veligers use yolk stored in the egg as an energy source for development. In such cases, the organ systems necessary for juvenile life develop either during the embryonic period and/or during a usually brief larval stage. Non-feeding veliger larvae are generally thought to metamorphose to the juvenile stage relatively quickly; however, in some cases such larvae can feed secondarily and thus have the potential to persist in the plankton for long periods.

Metamorphosis of feeding and non-feeding competent larvae is usually induced by a chemical cue characteristic of the proper habitat for the juvenile. In gastropods, this chemical cue is often a substance produced by the juvenile or adult food source. In bivalves, the chemical cue may be produced by bacteria specific to the type of biofilm growing in the adult habitat. As a result of this inductive response the veliger will metamorphose in a habitat where it can successfully feed and grow to adulthood.

== Veliger of gastropods ==
The veliger is the second larval stage in the development of gastropods, following the earlier trochophore stage. In some species, including virtually all pulmonates, the veliger stage is passed within the egg capsule and the hatching stage is a juvenile rather than a free-living larva. In species with a larval stage, the veliger is exclusively aquatic. Free-living veliger larvae typically feed on phytoplankton; however, the larvae of some species are lecithotrophic (nourished by yolk from the egg that is retained within their bodies) and do not need to feed. In at least some cases, lecithotrophic veligers can also feed on phytoplankton.

Unlike the trochophore, the newly hatched veliger may have or will develop many of the characteristic features of the adult including such structures as a muscular foot, eyes, rhinophores, a fully developed mouth, and a spiral shell (in fact, the veliger of nudibranchs has a shell, although the adult does not). Unlike the adult, however, the veliger has two ciliated semi-circular structures resembling fins or wings. These are collectively referred to as the velum and are the larva's main means of propulsion and particulate food collection.

The torsion of the visceral mass so distinctive of many gastropods occurs during the veliger stage. This sudden rotation of the bodily organs relative to the rest of the animal may take anywhere from three minutes to ten days, depending on species.

The length of the veliger stage in the natural environment is unknown and undoubtedly variable; however, in the lab, veligers of some species become competent to metamorphose in anywhere from a few days (lecithotrophic larvae) to a month or more after hatching (planktotrophic larvae). The feeding larvae of some species have been cultured for over a year and have still retained the ability to metamorphose. As the veliger stage reaches metamorphic competence, the foot becomes sufficiently developed to allow crawling on the substratum and internal development has established the organ systems necessary for juvenile life. In many species, induction of metamorphosis occurs as a sensory response to a chemical cue indicative of the juvenile and/or adult habitat. Often this cue (the inducer) is a water-soluble chemical secreted by the adult food. Induction of metamorphosis results in the larva settling to the substratum. This settlement may be followed by a "searching" phase as the larva apparently looks for an appropriate place to metamorphose. When metamorphosis occurs, the velum is lost, and the newly metamorphosed juvenile adopts its slug-like adult form.

Whole development of veliger of nudibranch Fiona pinnata:

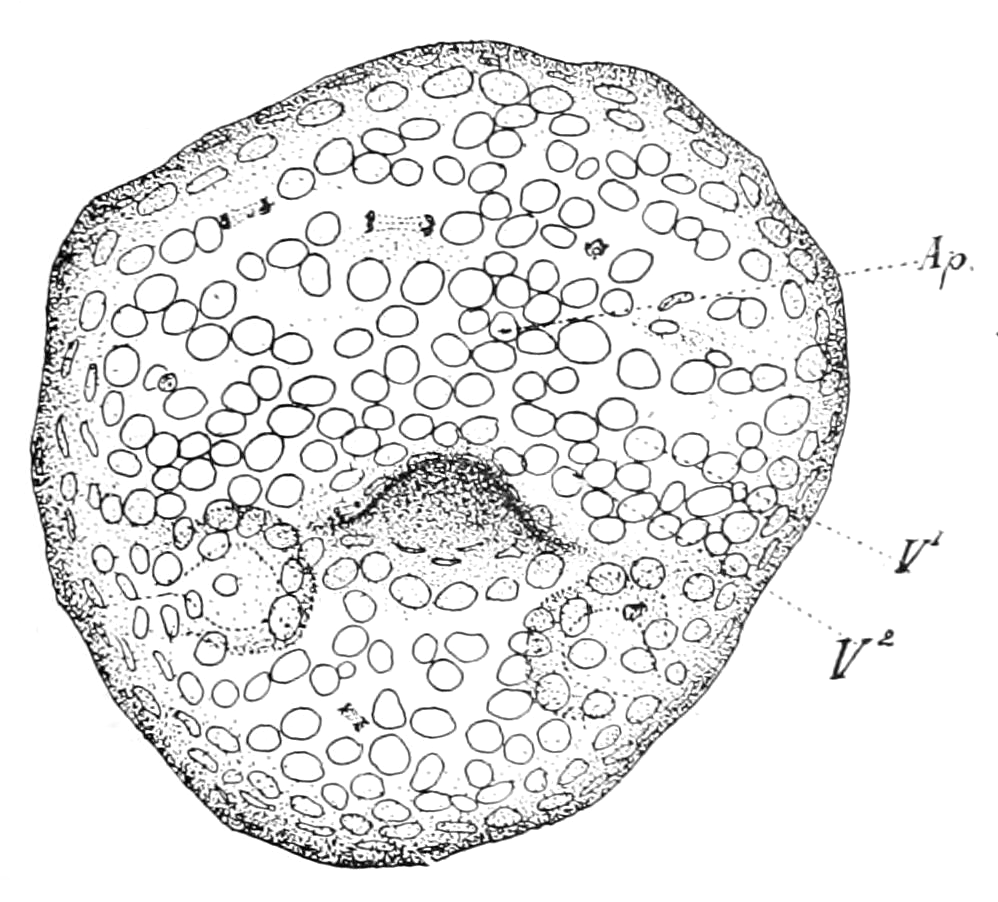
Drawing of anterior view of young veliger of Fiona pinnata.

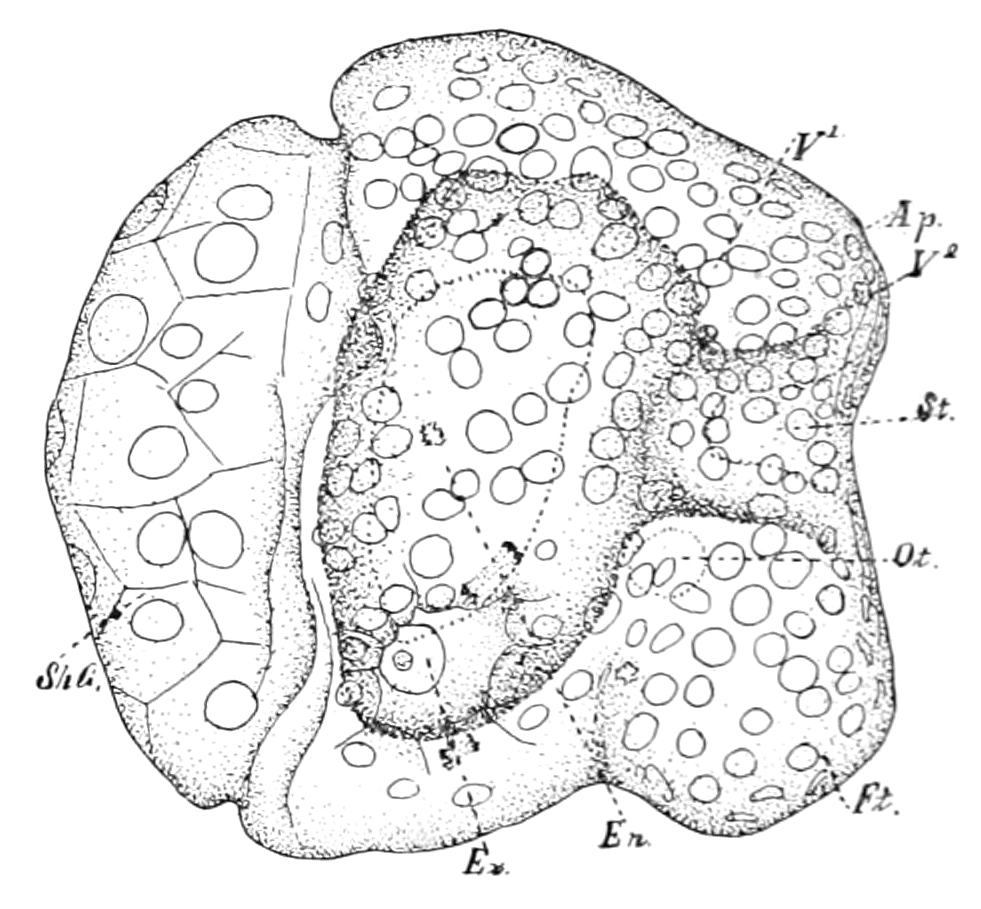
Drawing of right side of young veliger.

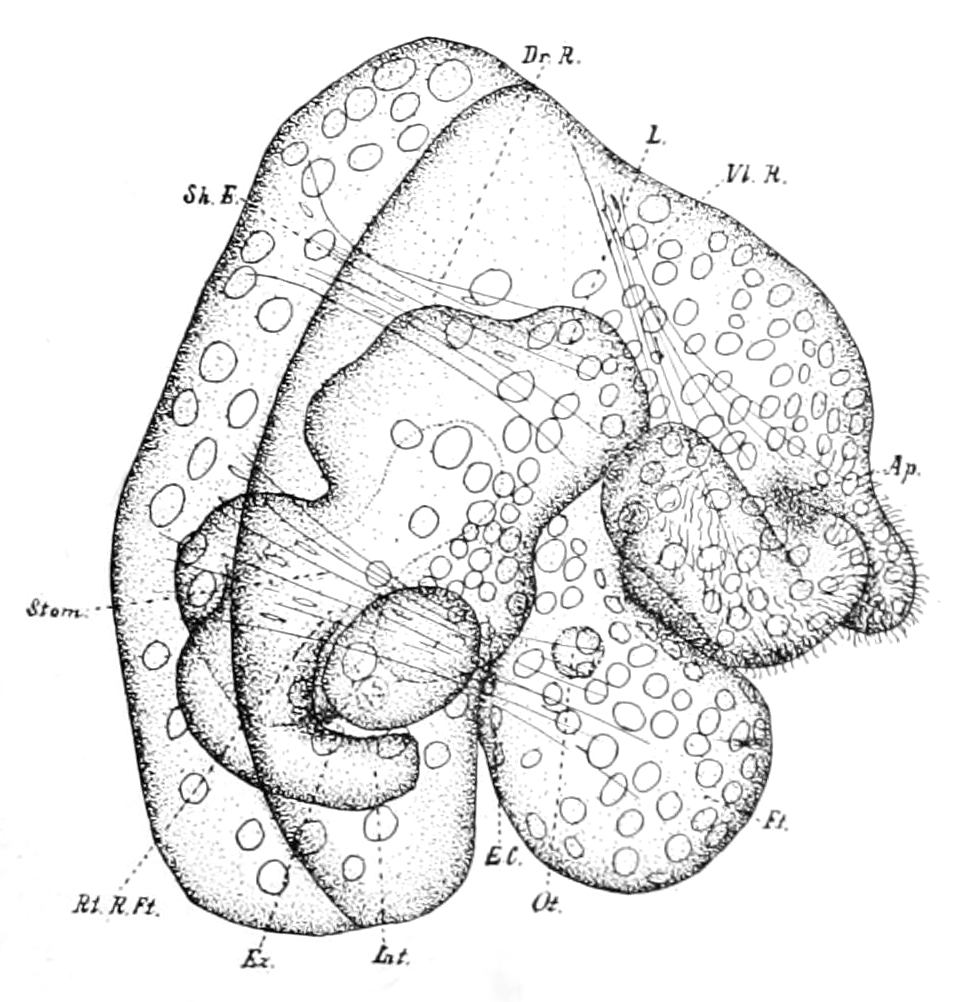
Drawing of right side of veliger.

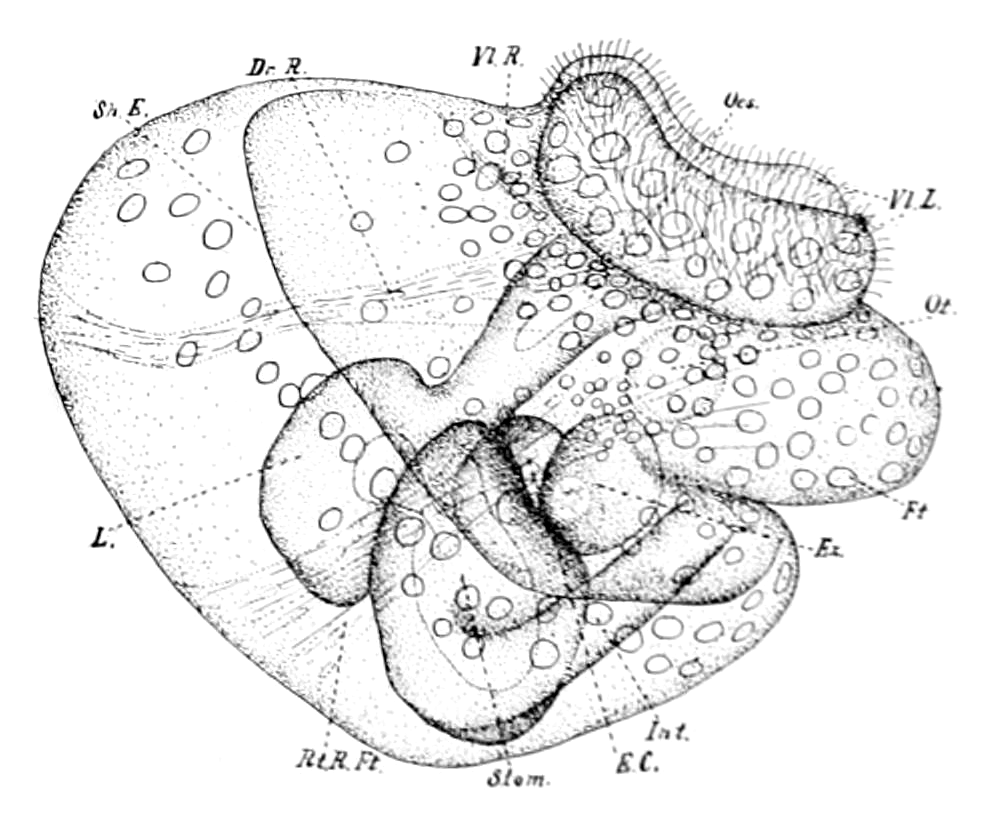
Drawing of right side of veliger.

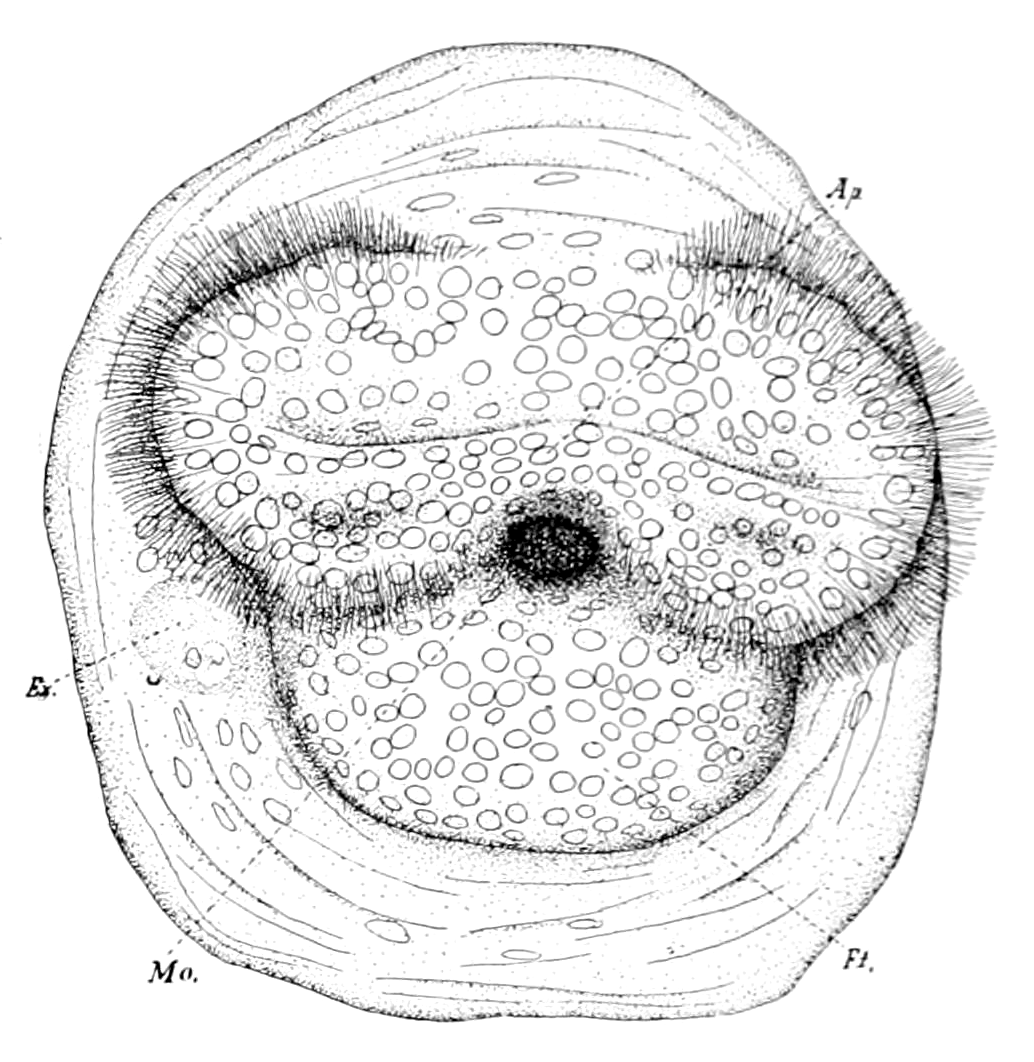
Anterior view of well developed veliger.

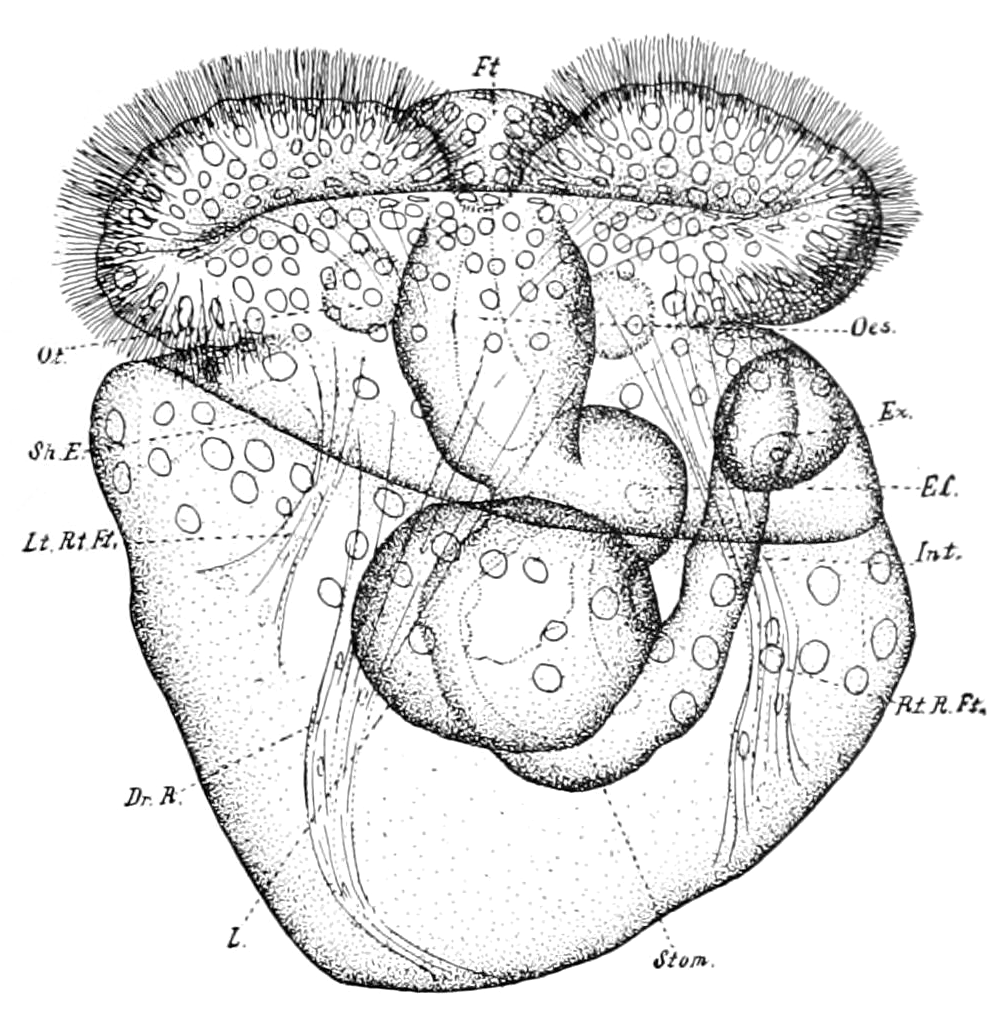
Dorsal view of well developed veliger.

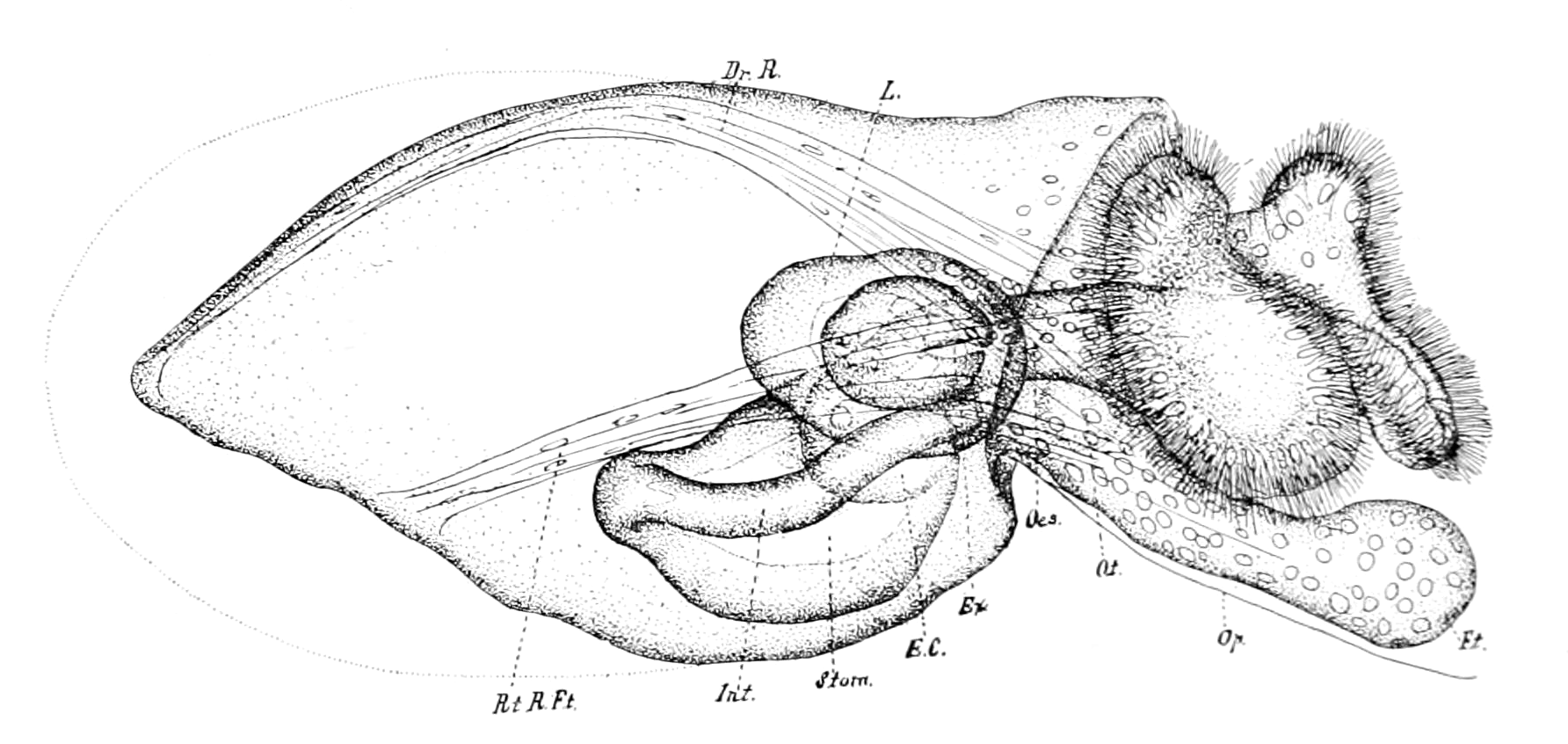
Right side of veliger just before hatching.

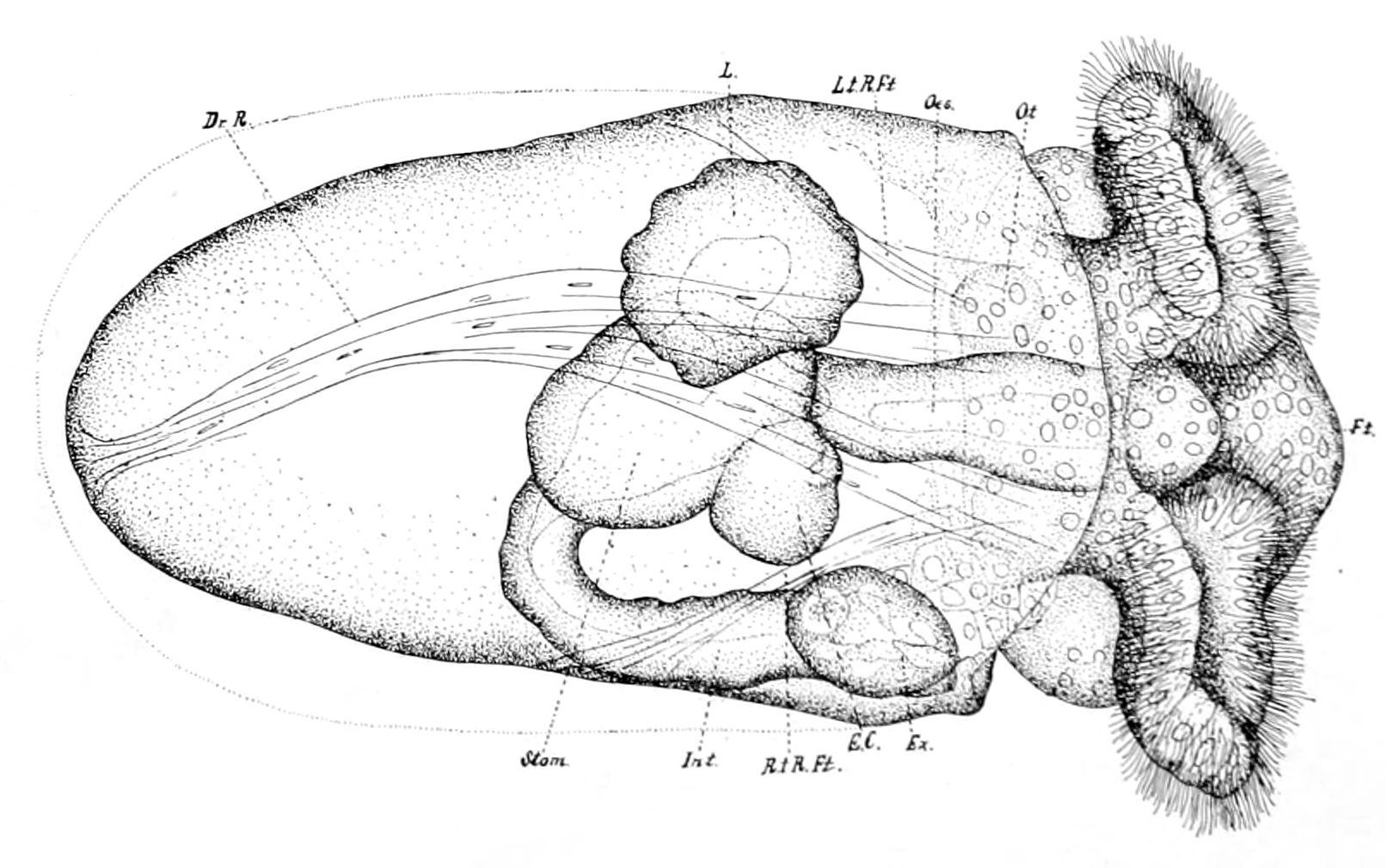
Dorsal view of veliger just before hatching.

=== Echinospira ===
Some prosobranch gastropod veliger larvae are called Echinospiras because they have two shells, the adult shell, and an extra shell called an Echinospira or scaphoconcha. It is described in detail at this link.

== Veliger of bivalves ==
Like gastropods, the veliger of bivalves typically follows a free-living trochophore stage. Shipworms, however, hatch directly as veligers, with the trochophore being an embryonic stage within the egg capsule. Many freshwater species go further, with the veliger also remaining within the egg capsule, and only hatching after metamorphosing into the adult form.

The shell of a bivalve veliger first appears as a single structure along the dorsal surface of the larva. This grows around the veliger's body, becoming folded into two valves similar to the adult condition. The velum is a single circular structure that projects from between the valves, in front of the small foot. As in the gastropods, the veligers of bivalves may either feed on phytoplankton or survive off yolk retained from the egg. In plankton feeding veligers, the larva can undergo considerable growth. As this occurs, the shell (known as a prodissoconch) and structures such as the larval foot, velum and visceral organs increase in size. As is the case for planktotrophic gastropod veligers, the larvae continue to feed and grow until they develop the organs and systems necessary for metamorphosis to the juvenile stage. At this point, the larvae are considered competent (able to metamorphose) and can respond to a chemical cue indicative of the adult habitat. In bivalves, this cue may be released by bacteria in biofilms characteristic of an appropriate adult environment.

During metamorphosis, the veliger sheds its velum and, depending on species, may secrete an attachment structure called a byssus that anchors it to the substratum. Some species spend considerable time searching for an ideal habitat before metamorphosing, but others may settle on the nearest suitable substrate.

== Veliger of scaphopods ==
The scaphopods, or tusk shells, have a veliger larva very similar to that of bivalves, despite the great difference in the appearance of the adults. The shell develops in a similar way, developing a bi-lobed form that surrounds the larval body. However, unlike bivalves, this never splits into two, and, in fact, fuses along the ventral margin, eventually becoming a tube that encloses the length of the body, and is open at both ends.

The scaphopod veliger is free-living, and metamorphosis is marked by a great elongation of the body, in order to assume the adult form.

== See also ==
- Trochophore
- Holoplankton – some gastropods spend their entire lives as plankton
