= Prodissoconch =

Larval shell of a mollusk

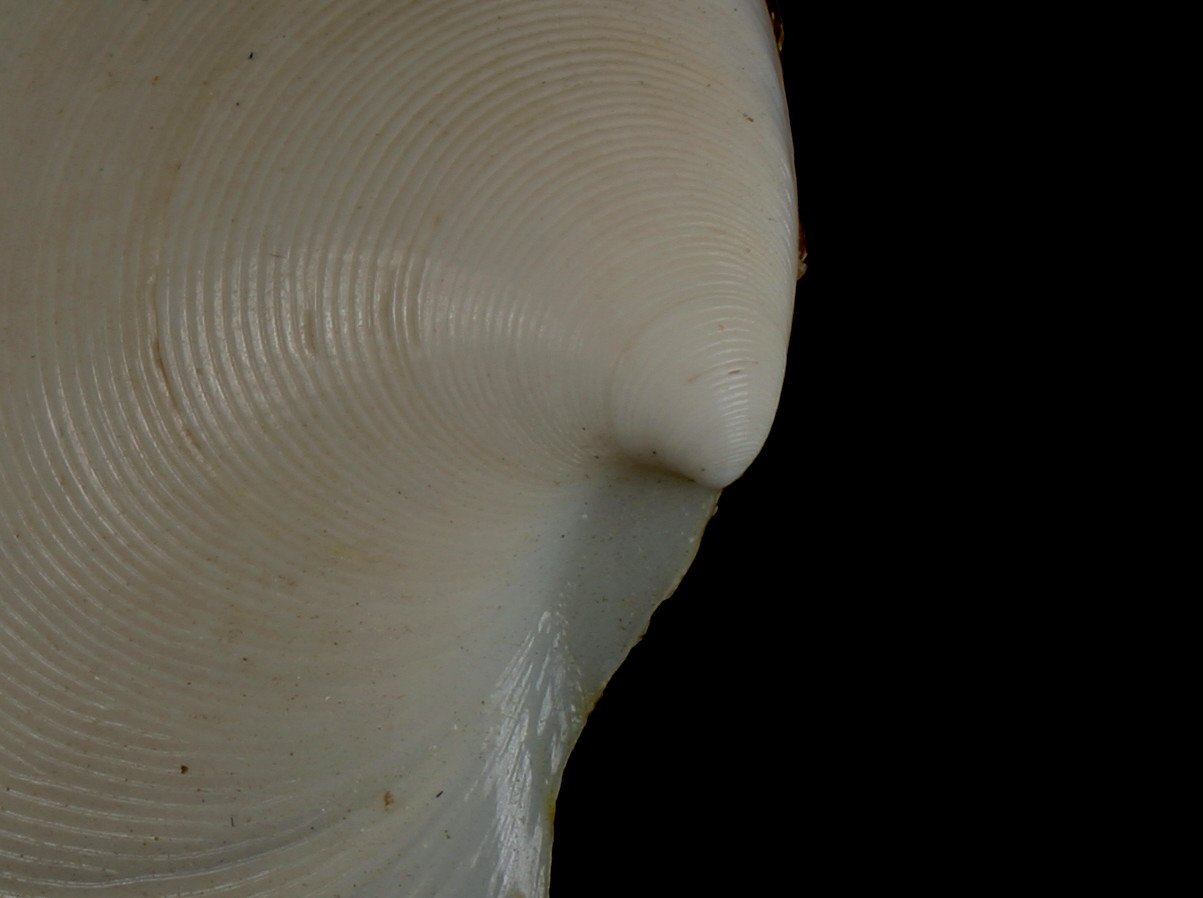
Umbo view of one valve of Dosina japonica with prodissoconch visible

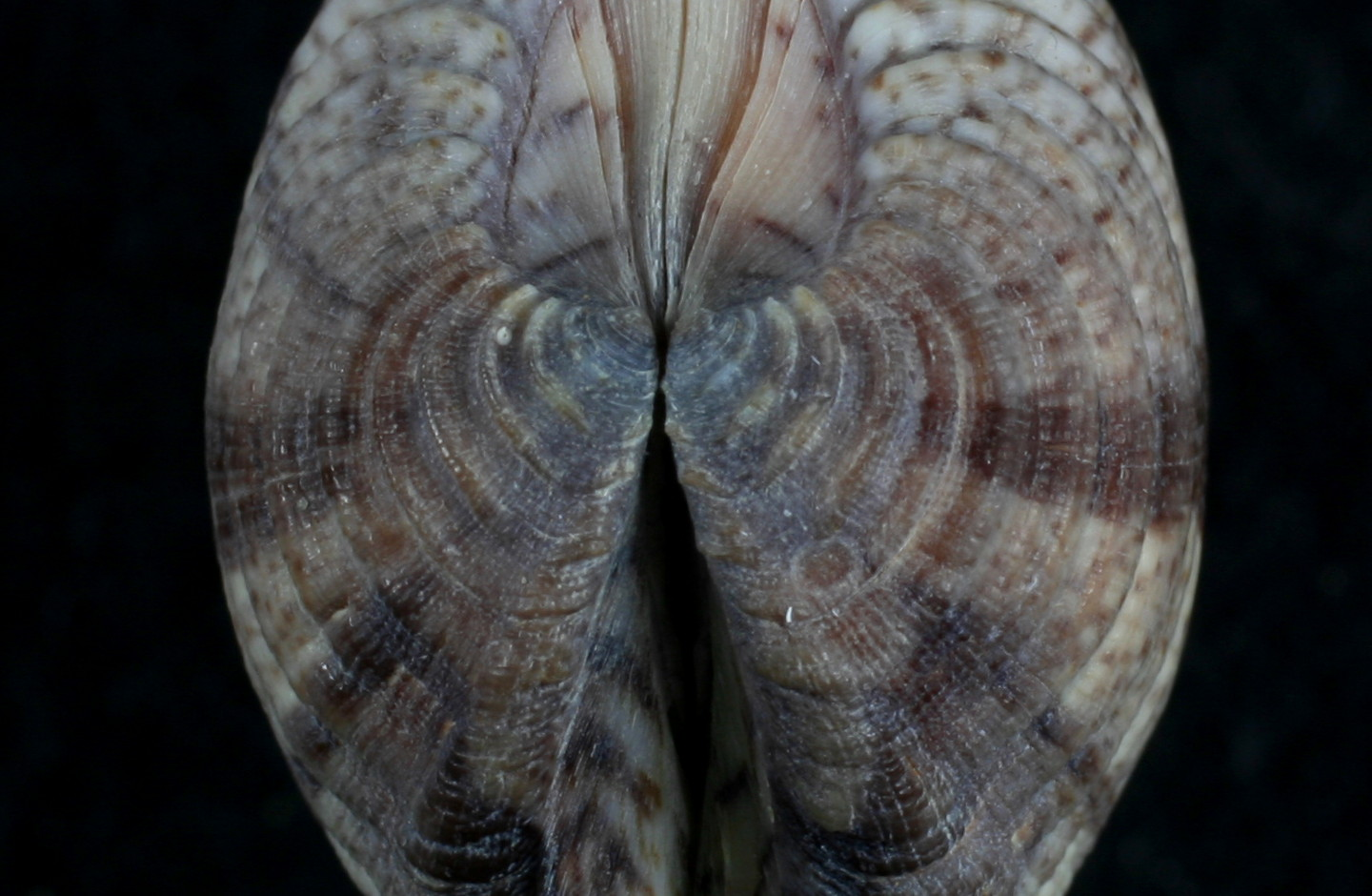
Umbo view of paired valves of Chione subrugosa with prodissoconchs visible

A prodissoconch (meaning first or earliest or original shell) is an embryonic or larval shell which is present in the larva of a bivalve mollusk (clams, scallops, oysters, etc.). (The homologous structure in gastropods (snails) is called the protoconch.) The prodissoconch is often but not always smooth, and has no growth lines. It is sometimes still present and visible in the adult shell, if there has been no erosion of the shell in that area.

The structure of the prodissoconch has been widely used as a discriminating feature in bivalve systematics.

== Position ==
Once the larval bivalve settles and becomes a juvenile, the rest of the shell starts to grow. The earliest part of the shell that formed often shows in the adult shell as a protruding area known as the umbo, at the tip of which is the prodissoconch, assuming it has not been eroded or obscured in some other way. Quite often there is a visible line of demarcation where the prodissoconch ends and the umbo begins, and there may be a sudden appearance of sculpture at that point.

== Larval stages ==
In species which have a veliger or swimming larval stage which hatches out of egg capsules (uncommon in bivalves), there are two parts to the prodissoconch. The first part of the prodissoconch (which is formed when the larva is still within the embryonic egg capsule) is called prodissoconch I, while the part that is formed after the larva has hatched is called prodissoconch II. There is often different sculpture or ornamentation on prodissoconch I compared with prodissoconch II, and this can be distinguished under the microscope.

The prodissoconch I valves of the larval bivalve mollusc are thin, smooth and translucent, and generally appear during the first 24 hours of life. Smooth valves continue to grow symmetrically and a gently sloping umbo projects from the middle of the hinge line. The prodissoconch II valves are secreted onto the prodissoconch I valves by the edge of the mantle and are still smooth but have faint microsculpture. Following metamorphosis the bivalve larvae (known as veligers) develop a foot and the velum (or cilia) is reabsorbed and lost. After metamorphosis there is a distinct line where the prodissoconch II stage ends and the part of the valves known as the dissoconch begins and the bivalve mollusk begins its adult sessile existence. During metamorphosis, the veliger, depending on species, may secrete an attachment structure called a byssus that anchors it to the substratum. Some species spend considerable time searching for an ideal habitat before metamorphosing, but others may settle on the nearest suitable substrate.
