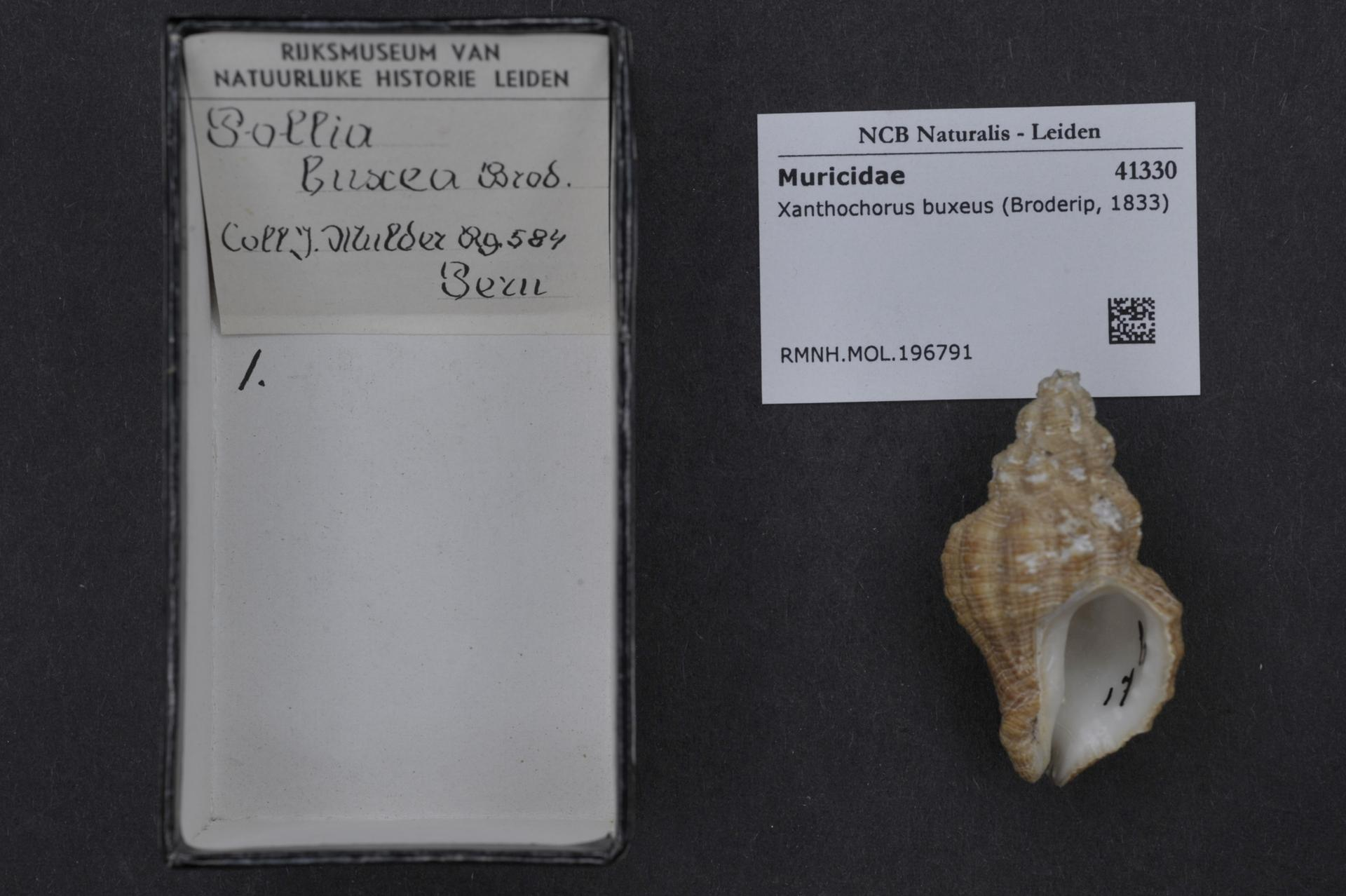

Scientific classification
- Kingdom: Animalia
- Phylum: Mollusca
- Class: Gastropoda
- Subclass: Caenogastropoda
- Order: Neogastropoda
- Family: Muricidae
- Genus: Xanthochorus
- Species: X. buxeus

Binomial name
- Xanthochorus buxeus (Broderip, 1833)

Synonyms
- Murex boivini Kiener, 1842; Murex broderipii Michelotti, 1841; Murex buxeus Broderip in Broderip & Sowerby, 1833; Murex horridus Broderip in Sowerby, 1833

= Xanthochorus buxeus =

Species of gastropod

Xanthochorus buxeus is a species of sea snail, a marine gastropod mollusk in the family Muricidae, the murex snails or rock snails. It is a predator.
