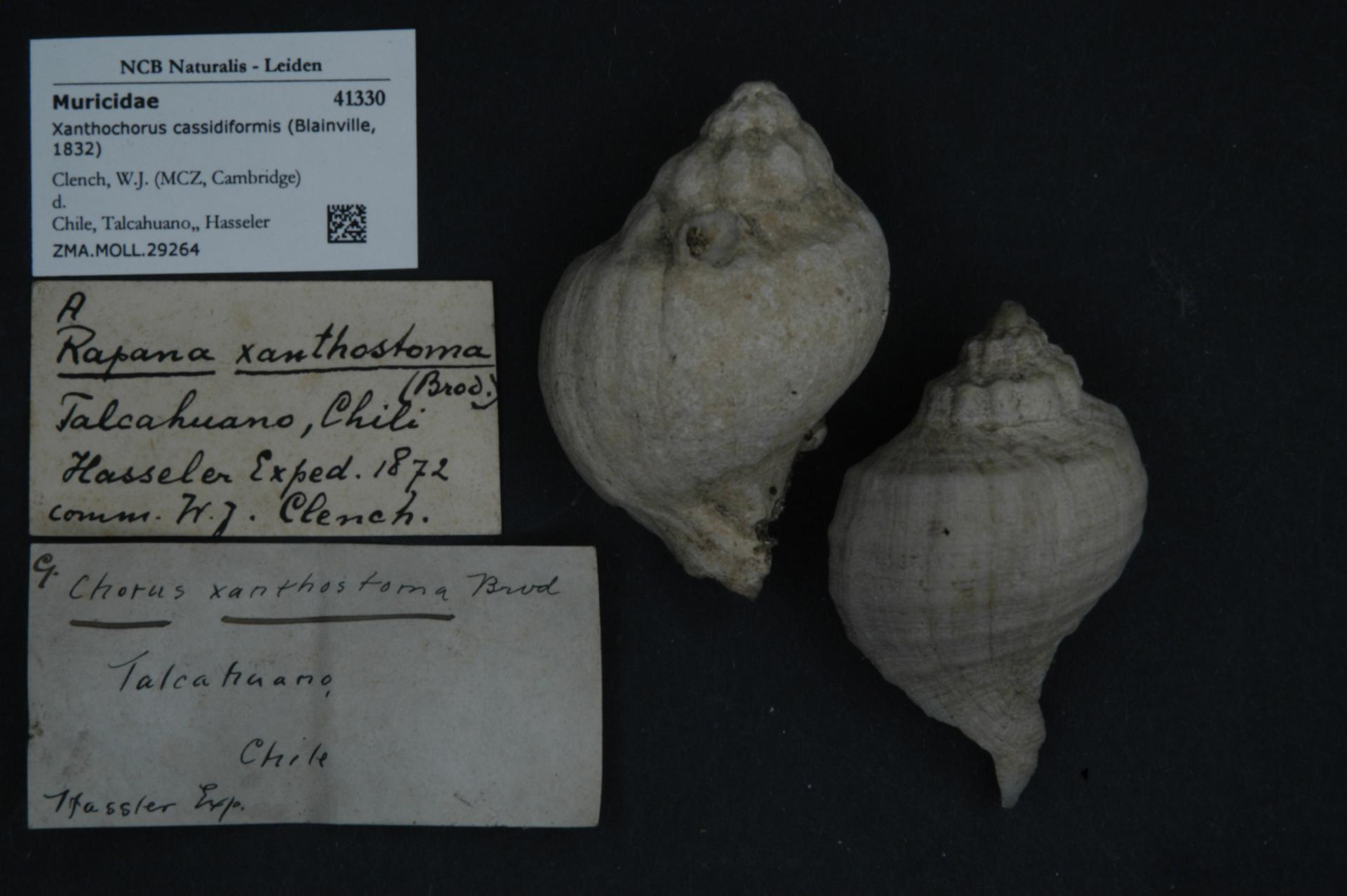
- Xanthochorus cassidiformis shells

Scientific classification
- Kingdom: Animalia
- Phylum: Mollusca
- Class: Gastropoda
- Subclass: Caenogastropoda
- Order: Neogastropoda
- Family: Muricidae
- Genus: Xanthochorus
- Species: X. cassidiformis

Binomial name
- Xanthochorus cassidiformis (Blainville, 1832)

Synonyms
- Murex squamosus Broderip in Broderip & Sowerby, 1833; Purpura cassidiformis Blainville, 1832; Purpura xanthostoma Broderip, 1833; Pyrula ochroleuca Menke, 1845; Pyrula porphyroidea Philippi, 1887; Pyrula subnodosa Philippi, 1887

= Xanthochorus cassidiformis =

Species of gastropod

Xanthochorus cassidiformis is a species of sea snail, a marine gastropod mollusk in the family Muricidae, the murex snails or rock snails.
