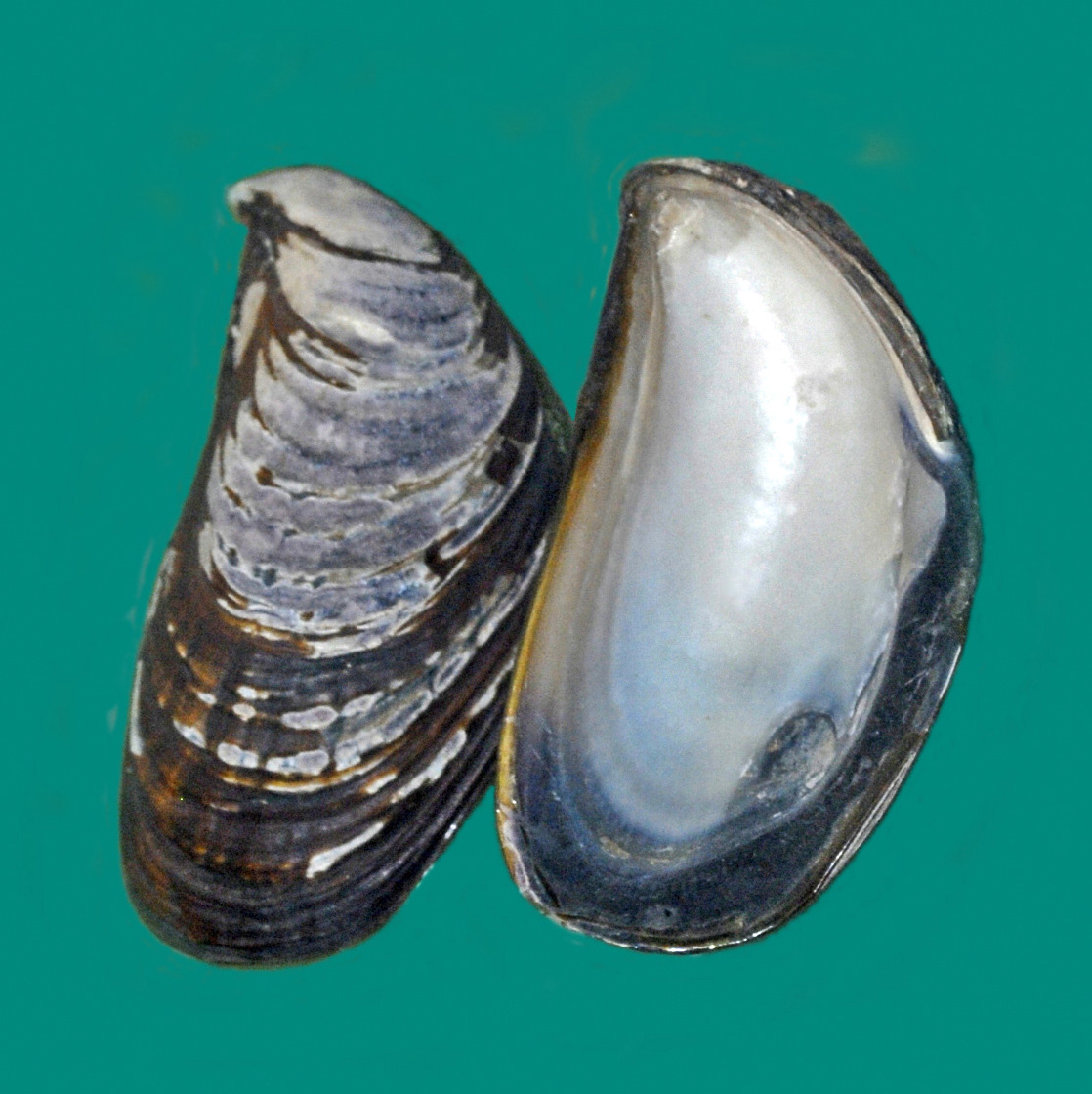
- Choromytilus chorus

Scientific classification
- Domain: Eukaryota
- Kingdom: Animalia
- Phylum: Mollusca
- Class: Bivalvia
- Order: Mytilida
- Family: Mytilidae
- Genus: Choromytilus; Soot-Ryen, 1952

= Choromytilus =

Genus of bivalves

Choromytilus is a genus of mussel, a marine bivalve mollusc in the family Mytilidae.

== Species ==
- Choromytilus chorus (Molina, 1782)
- Choromytilus meridionalis (Krauss, 1848)
- Choromytilus palliopunctatus (Carpenter, 1857)
