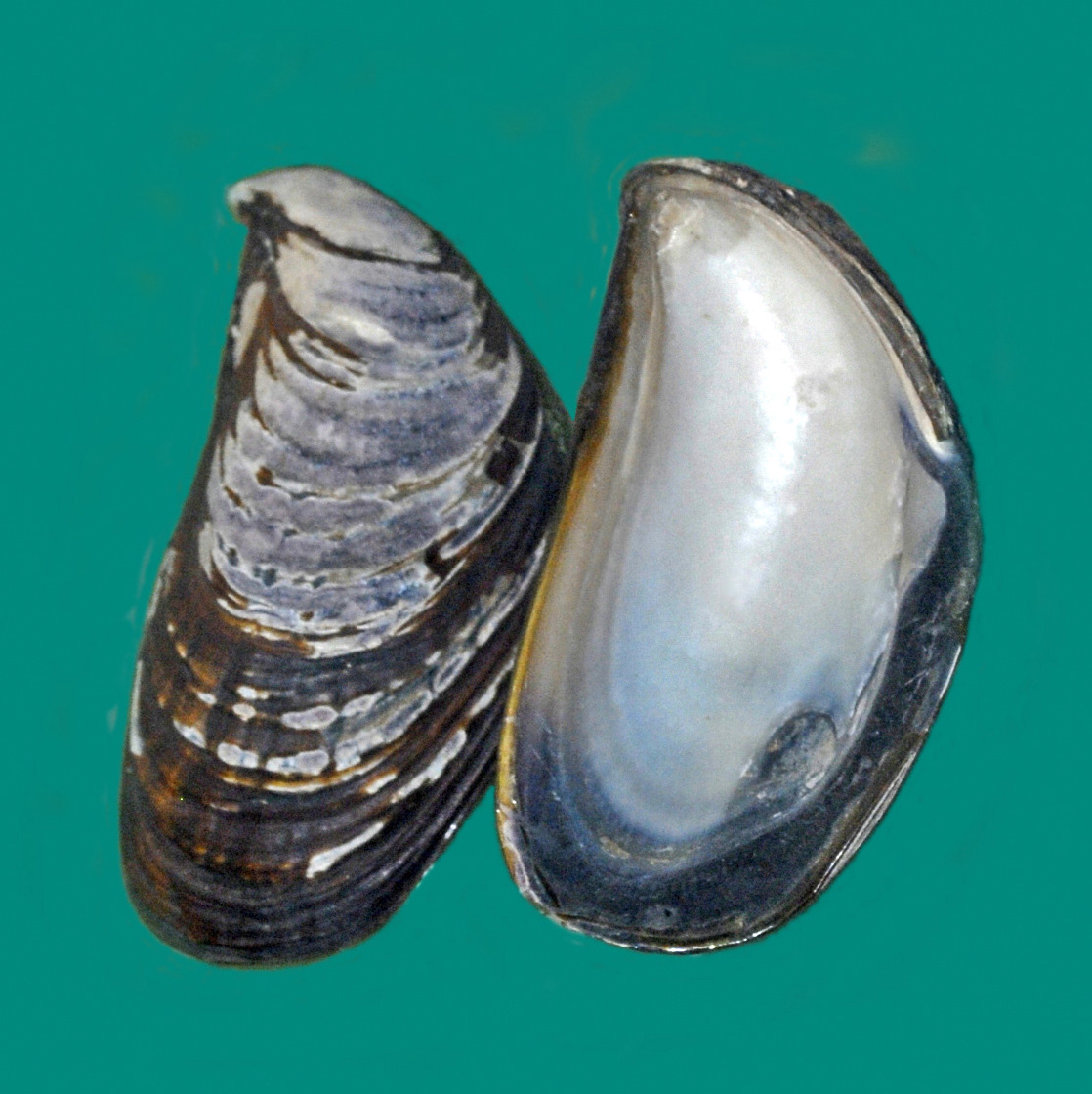
- A view of valves of Choromytilus chorus

Scientific classification
- Domain: Eukaryota
- Kingdom: Animalia
- Phylum: Mollusca
- Class: Bivalvia
- Order: Mytilida
- Family: Mytilidae
- Genus: Choromytilus
- Species: C. chorus

Binomial name
- Choromytilus chorus (Molina, 1782)

Synonyms
- Mytilus albus Molina, 1782; Mytilus chorus Molina, 1782; Mytilus compressus Reeve, 1858; Mytilus latus Lamarck, 1819; Mytilus ungulatus Lamarck, 1819

= Choromytilus chorus =

Species of bivalve

Choromytilus chorus, commonly known as the Choro mussel or Giant mussel, is a species of mussel, a marine bivalve mollusc in the family Mytilidae.

== Description ==
A particularly large species of mussel, shells of Choromytilus chorus can reach a length of 18 cm (7 inches) and a height of 9 cm (3.5 inches)., one specimen found in April 2024 weighed 816 grams.

== Distribution ==
This species is present in Peru and in Chile.
