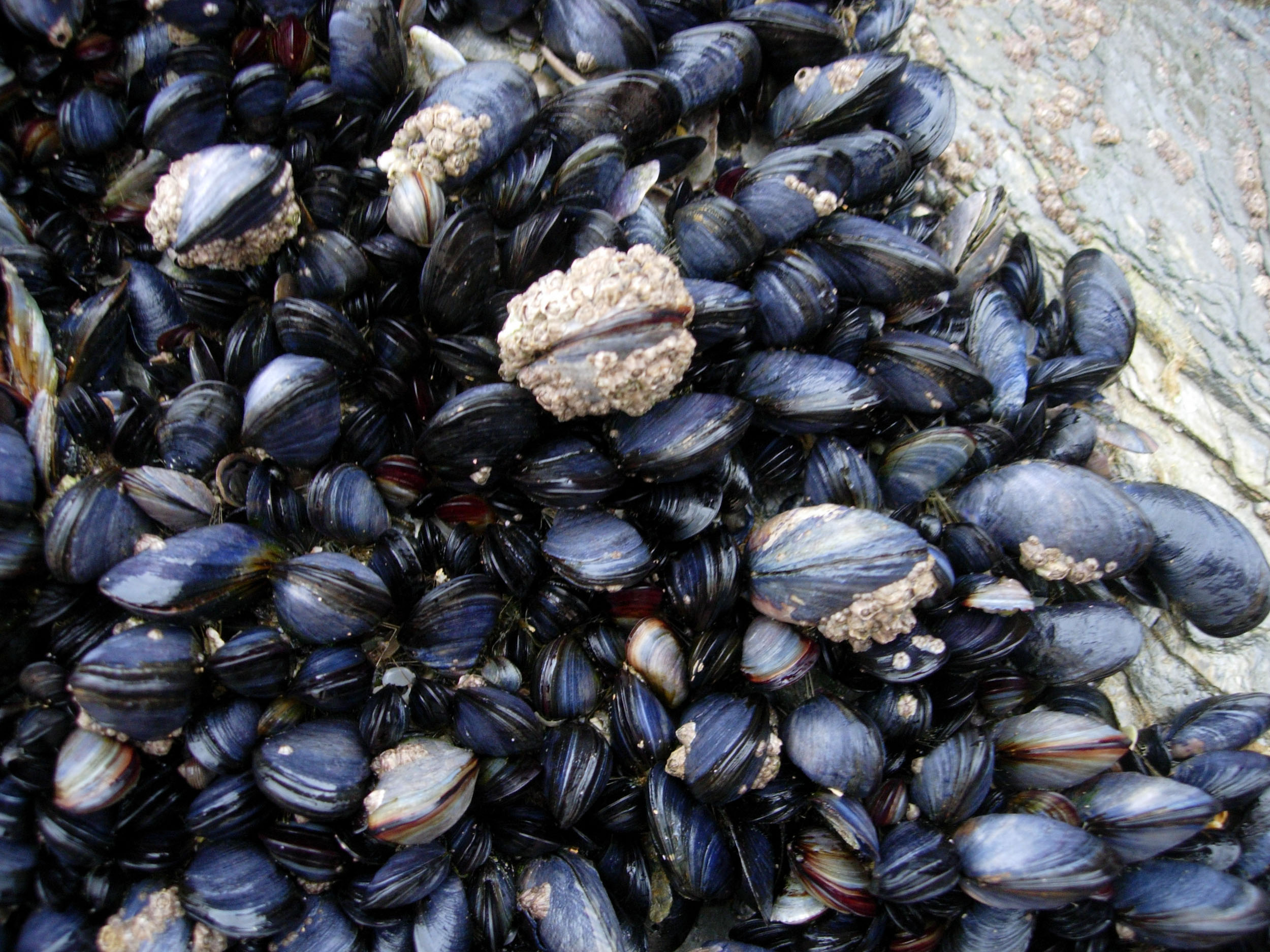
- A bed of blue mussels, Mytilus edulis, in the intertidal zone in Cornwall, England

Scientific classification
- Kingdom: Animalia
- Phylum: Mollusca
- Class: Bivalvia
- Subclass: Autobranchia

Clades
- Dreissenidae (zebra mussel and relatives); Mytilida (true mussels); Unionida (river mussels)

Cladistically included but traditionally excluded taxa
- All other members of Autobranchia

= Mussel =

Bivalve mollusc

Mussel (/ˈmʌsəl/) is the common name used for members of several families of bivalve molluscs, from saltwater and freshwater habitats. These groups have in common a shell whose outline is elongated and asymmetrical compared with other edible clams, which are often more or less rounded or oval.

The word "mussel" is frequently used to mean the bivalves of the marine family Mytilidae, most of which live on exposed shores in the intertidal zone, attached by means of their strong byssal threads ("beard") to a firm substrate. A few species (in the genus Bathymodiolus) have colonised hydrothermal vents associated with deep ocean ridges.

In most marine mussels, the shell is a lot longer than it is wide, being wedge-shaped or asymmetrical. The external colour of the shell is often dark blue, blackish, or brown, while the interior is silvery and somewhat nacreous.

The common name "mussel" is also used for many freshwater bivalves, including the freshwater pearl mussels of the order Unionida. Freshwater mussel species inhabit lakes, ponds, rivers, creeks, canals, and they are classified in a different subclass of bivalves, despite some very superficial similarities in appearance.

Freshwater zebra mussels and their relatives in the family Dreissenidae are not related to previously mentioned groups, even though they resemble many Mytilus species in shape, and live attached to rocks and other hard surfaces in a similar manner, using a byssus. They are classified with the Heterodonta, the taxonomic group which includes most of the bivalves commonly referred to as "clams".

== General anatomy ==
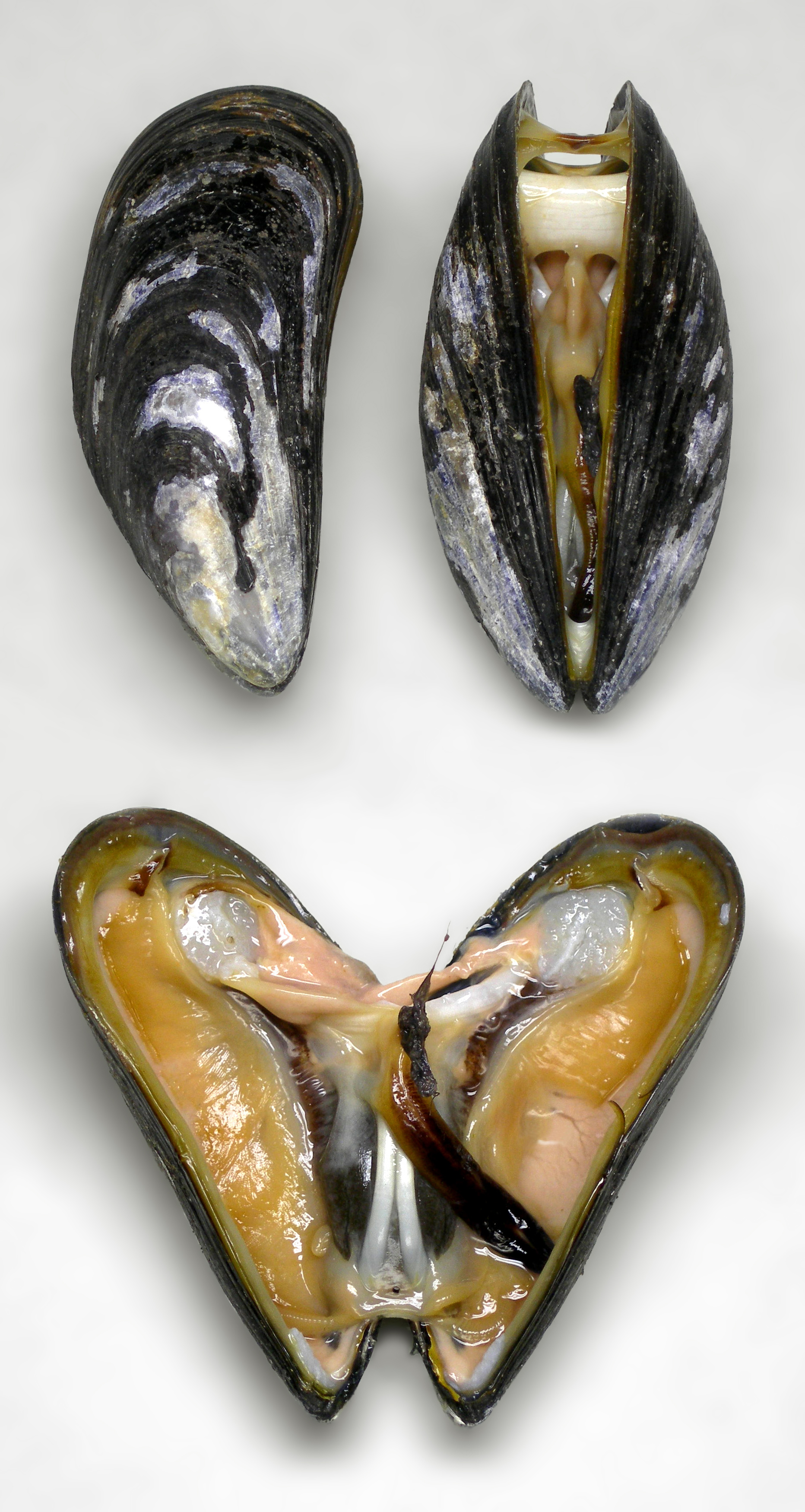
Marine blue mussel, Mytilus edulis, showing some of the inner anatomy. The white posterior adductor muscle is visible in the upper image, and has been cut in the lower image to allow the valves to open fully.

Flight around a 3D-rendering of a μCT-scan of a young Mytilus that is almost completely covered with Balanidae (barnacles). Resolution of the scan is 29 μm/Voxel.

The mussel's external shell is composed of two hinged halves or "valves". The valves are joined on the outside by a ligament, and are closed when necessary by strong internal muscles (anterior and posterior adductor muscles). Mussel shells carry out a variety of functions, including support for soft tissues, protection from predators and protection against desiccation.

The shell has three layers. In the pearly mussels there is an inner iridescent layer of nacre (mother-of-pearl) composed of calcium carbonate, which is continuously secreted by the mantle, a middle layer of chalky white crystals of calcium carbonate in a protein matrix caed the prismatic layer, and the periostracum, an outer pigmented layer resembling a skin. The periostracum is composed of a protein called conchin, and its function is to protect the prismatic layer from abrasion and dissolution by acids (especially important in freshwater forms where the decay of leaf materials produces acids).

Like most bivalves, mussels have a large organ called a foot. In freshwater mussels, the foot is large, muscular, and generally hatchet-shaped. It is used to pull the animal through the substrate (typically sand, gravel, or silt) in which it lies partially buried. It does this by repeatedly advancing the foot through the substrate, expanding the end so it serves as an anchor, and then pulling the rest of the animal with its shell forward. It also serves as a fleshy anchor when the animal is stationary.

In marine mussels, the foot is smaller, tongue-like in shape, with a groove on the ventral surface which is continuous with the byssus pit. In this pit, a viscous secretion is exuded, entering the groove and hardening gradually upon contact with sea water. This forms extremely tough, strong, elastic, byssal threads that secure the mussel to its substrate allowing it to remain sessile in areas of high flow. The byssal thread is also sometimes used by mussels as a defensive measure, to tether predatory molluscs, such as dog whelks, that invade mussel beds, immobilising them and thus starving them to death.

In cooking, the byssus of the mussel is known as the "beard" and is removed during preparation, often after cooking when the mussel has opened.

== Life habits ==
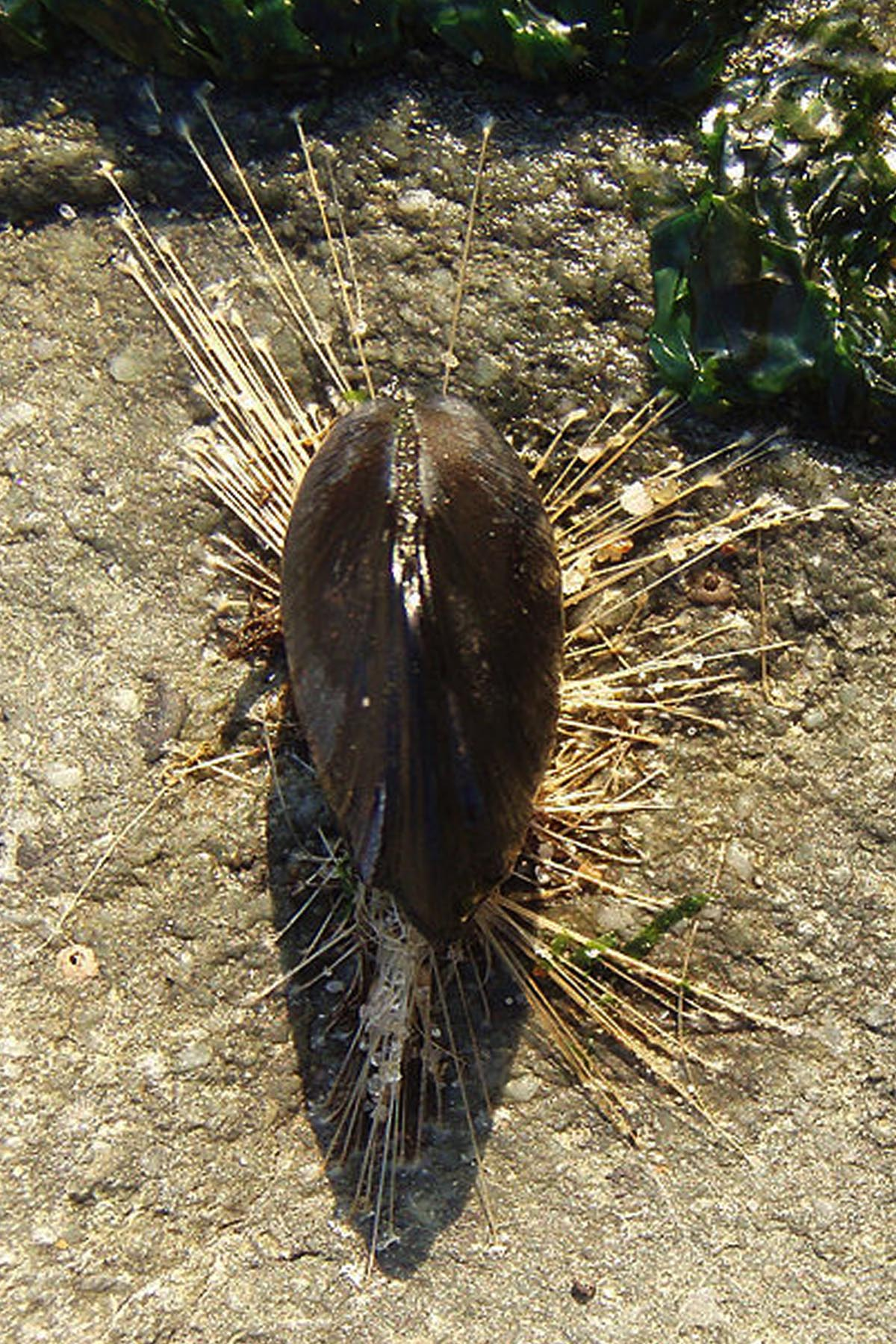
A Mytilus with its byssus clearly showing, at Ocean Beach, San Francisco, California

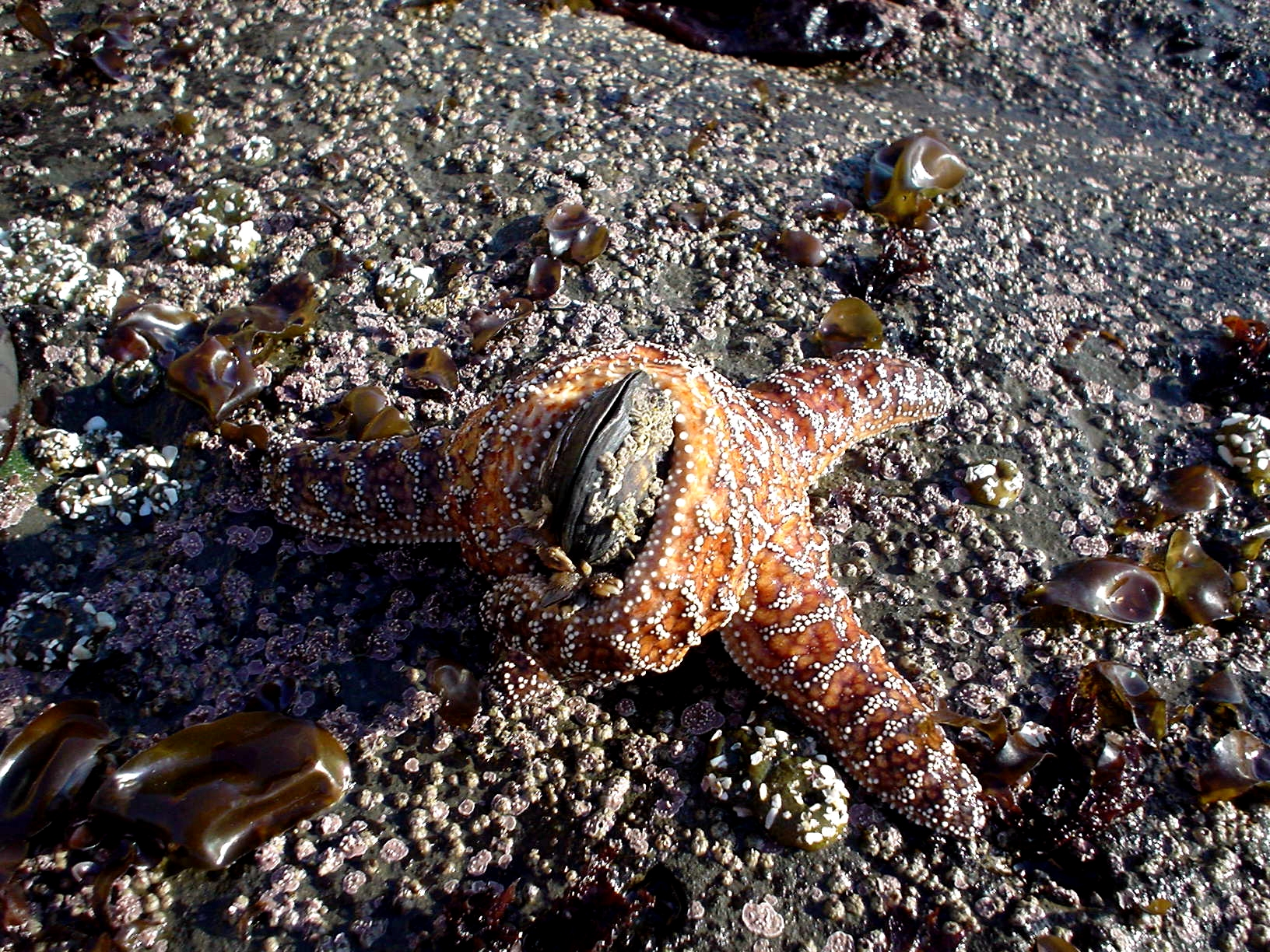
A sea star consuming a mussel in Northern California

=== Feeding ===
Both marine and freshwater mussels are filter feeders; they feed on plankton and other microscopic sea creatures which are free-floating in seawater. A mussel draws water in through its incurrent siphon. The water is then brought into the branchial chamber by the actions of the cilia located on the gills for ciliary-mucus feeding. The wastewater exits through the excurrent siphon. The labial palps finally funnel the food into the mouth, where digestion begins.

Marine mussels are usually found clumping together on wave-washed rocks, each attached to the rock by its byssus. The clumping habit helps hold the mussels firm against the force of the waves. At low tide mussels in the middle of a clump will undergo less water loss because of water capture by the other mussels.

=== Reproduction ===
Both marine and freshwater mussels are gonochoristic, with separate male and female individuals. In marine mussels, fertilization occurs outside the body, with a larval stage that drifts for three weeks to six months, before settling on a hard surface as a young mussel. There, it is capable of moving slowly by means of attaching and detaching byssal threads to attain a better life position.

Freshwater mussels reproduce sexually. Sperm is released by the male directly into the water and enters the female via the incurrent siphon. After fertilization, the eggs develop into a larval stage called a glochidium (plural glochidia), which temporarily parasitizes fish, attaching themselves to the fish's fins or gills. Prior to their release, the glochidia grow in the gills of the host fish where they are constantly flushed with oxygen-rich water. In some species, release occurs when a fish attempts to attack the mussel's mantle flaps, which are shaped like minnows or other prey, an example of aggressive mimicry.

Glochidia are generally species-specific, and will only live if they find the correct fish host. Once the larval mussels attach to the fish, the fish body reacts to cover them with cells forming a cyst, where the glochidia remain for two to five weeks (depending on temperature). They grow, break free from the host, and drop to the bottom of the water to begin an independent life.

=== Predators ===
Marine mussels are eaten by human beings, starfish, seabirds, and by numerous species of predatory marine gastropods in the family Muricidae, such as the dog whelk, Nucella lapillus. Freshwater mussels are eaten by muskrats, otters, raccoons, ducks, baboons, humans, and geese.

== Distribution and habitat ==
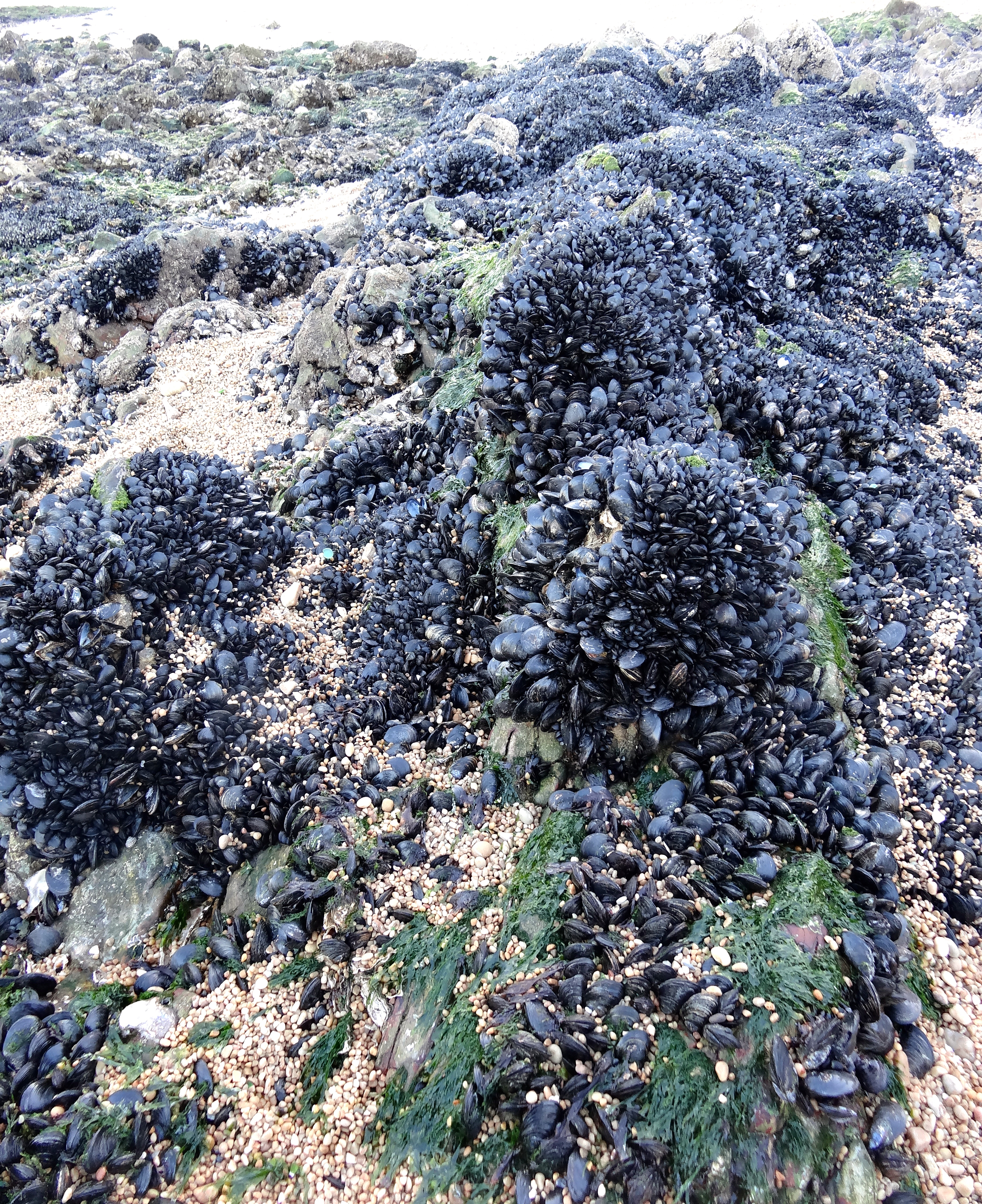
Mussels completely covering rocks in the intertidal zone, in Dalian, Liaoning Province, China

Marine mussels are abundant in the low and mid intertidal zone in temperate seas globally. Other species of marine mussel live in tropical intertidal areas, but not in the same huge numbers as in temperate zones.

Certain species of marine mussels prefer salt marshes or quiet bays, while others thrive in pounding surf, completely covering wave-washed rocks. Some species have colonized abyssal depths near hydrothermal vents. The South African white mussel exceptionally does not bind itself to rocks but burrows into sandy beaches extending two tubes above the sand surface for ingestion of food and water and exhausting wastes.

Freshwater mussels inhabit permanent lakes, rivers, canals and streams throughout the world except in the polar regions. They require a constant source of cool, clean water. They prefer water with a substantial mineral content, using calcium carbonate to build their shells.

== Aquaculture ==
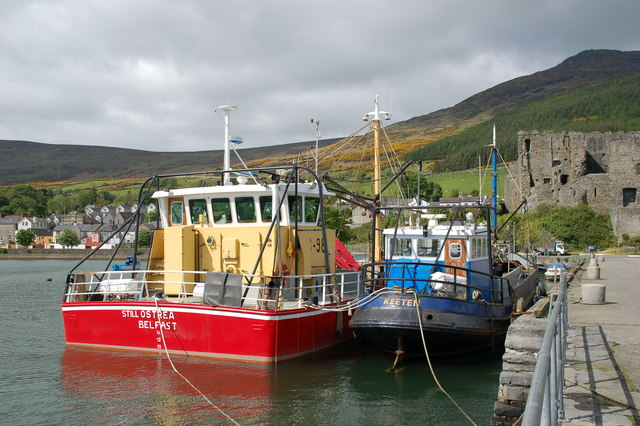
Mussel dredgers

In 2005, China accounted for 40% of the global mussel catch according to a FAO study. Within Europe, where mussels have been cultivated for centuries, Spain remained the industry leader. Aquaculture of mussels in North America began in the 1970s. In the US, the northeast and northwest have significant mussel aquaculture operations, where Mytilus edulis (blue mussel) is most commonly grown. While the mussel industry in the US has increased, in North America, 80% of cultured mussels are produced in Prince Edward Island in Canada. In Washington state, an estimated 2.9 million pounds of mussels were harvested in 2010, valued at roughly $4.3M. In New Zealand, Perna canaliculus (the New Zealand green-lipped mussel), industry produces over 140,000 metric tons (150,000 short tons) annually and in 2009 was valued in excess of NZ$250 million.

=== Culture methods ===
Freshwater mussels are used as host animals for the cultivation of freshwater pearls. Some species of marine mussel, including the blue mussel (Mytilus edulis) and the New Zealand green-lipped mussel (Perna canaliculus), are also cultivated as a source of food.

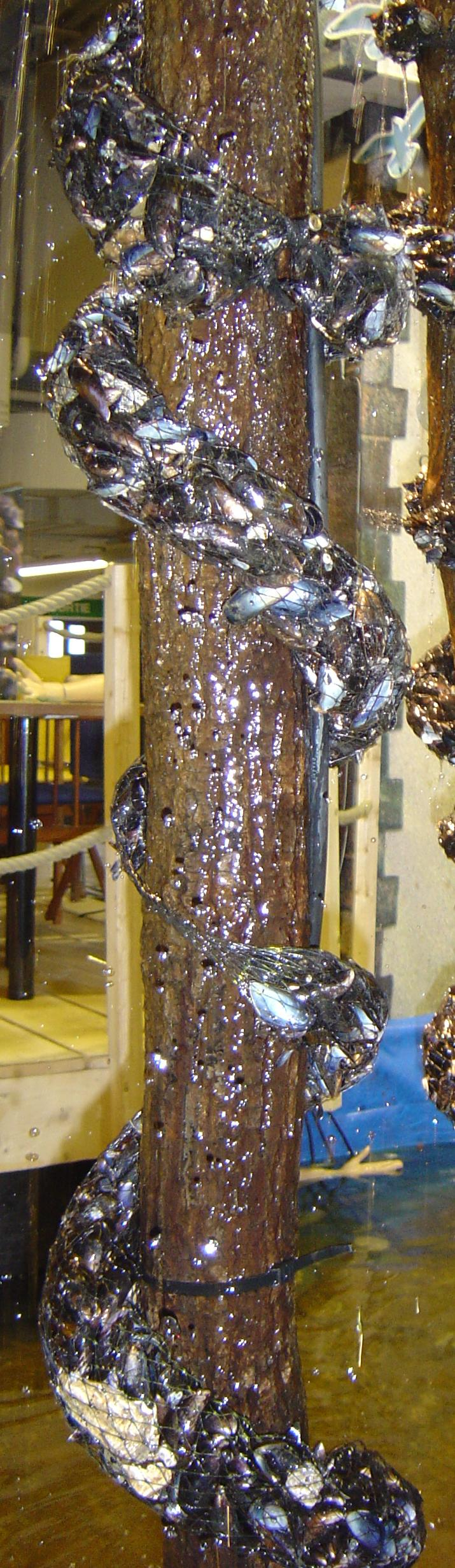
Bouchots are marine pilings for growing mussels, here shown at an agricultural fair.

In some areas of the world, mussel farmers collect naturally occurring marine mussel seed for transfer to more appropriate growing areas, however, most North American mussel farmers rely on hatchery-produced seed. Growers typically purchase seed after it has set (about 1 mm in size) or after it has been nursed in upwellers for 3–6 additional weeks and is 2–3 mm. The seed is then typically reared in a nursery environment, where it is transferred to a material with a suitable surface for later relocation to the growing area. After about three months in the nursery, mussel seed is "socked" (placed in a tube-like mesh material) and hung on longlines or rafts for grow-out. Within a few days, the mussels migrate to the outside of the sock for better access food sources in the water column. Mussels grow quickly and are usually ready for harvest in less than two years. Unlike other cultured bivalves, mussels use byssus threads (beard) to attach themselves to any firm substrate, which makes them suitable for a number of culture methods.

There are a variety of techniques for growing mussels.

- Bouchot culture: Intertidal growth technique, or bouchot technique: pilings, known in French as bouchots, are planted at sea; ropes, on which the mussels grow, are tied in a spiral on the pilings; some mesh netting prevents the mussels from falling away. This method needs an extended tidal zone.
- On-bottom culture: On-bottom culture is based on the principle of transferring mussel seed (spat) from areas where they have settled naturally to areas where they can be placed in lower densities to increase growth rates, facilitate harvest, and control predation (Mussel farmers must remove predators and macroalgae during the growth cycle).
- Raft culture: Raft culture is a commonly used method throughout the world. Lines of rope mesh socks are seeded with young mussels and suspended vertically from a raft. The specific length of the socks depends on depth and food availability.
- Longline culture (rope culture): Mussels are cultivated extensively in New Zealand, where the most common method is to attach mussels to ropes which are hung from a rope back-bone supported by large plastic floats. The most common species cultivated in New Zealand is the New Zealand green-lipped mussel. Longline culture is the most recent development for mussel culture and are often used as an alternative to raft culture in areas that are more exposed to high wave energy. A long-line is suspended by a series of small anchored floats and ropes or socks of mussels are then suspended vertically from the line.
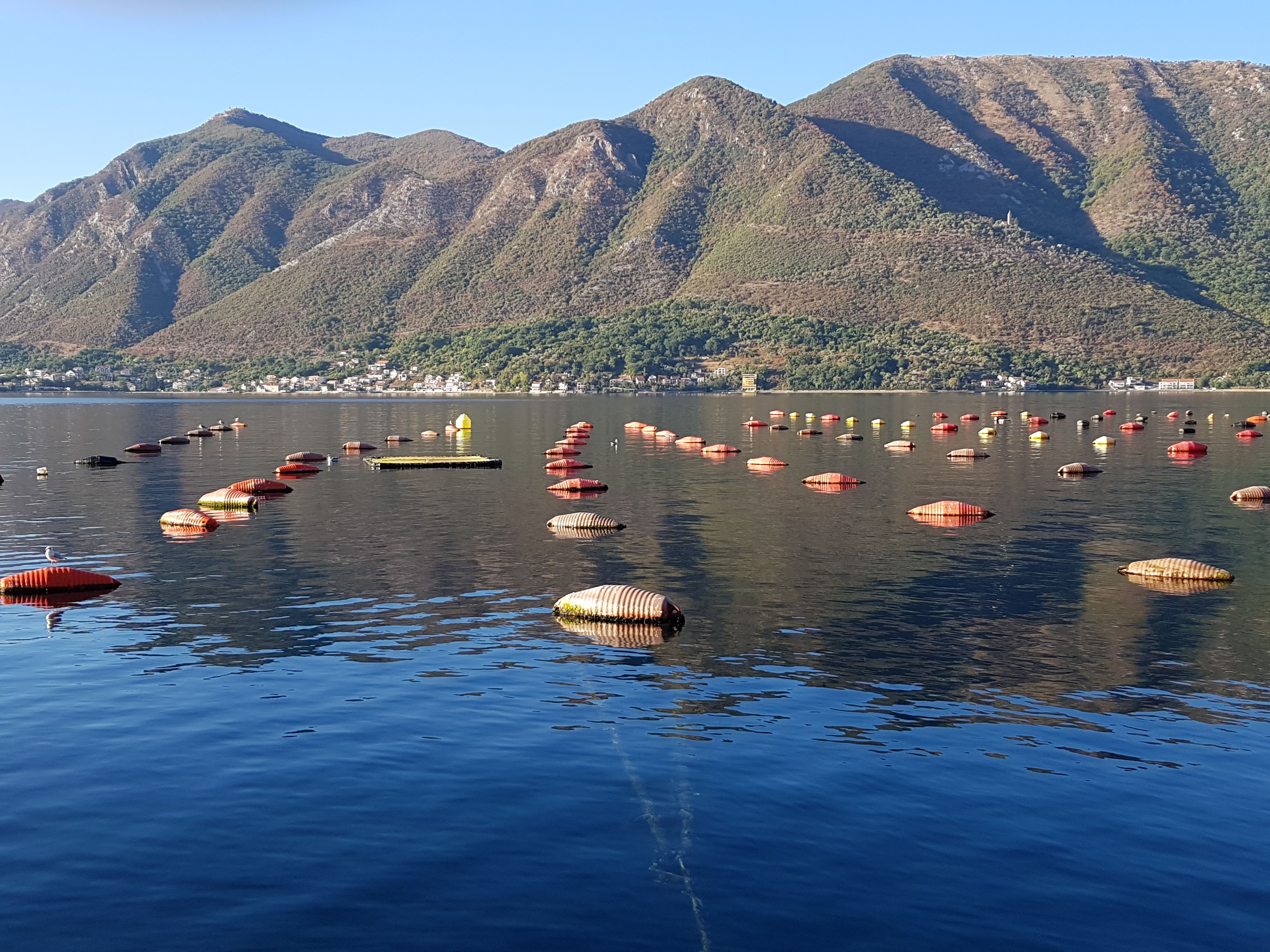
Longline mussel farm in Bay of Kotor, Montenegro

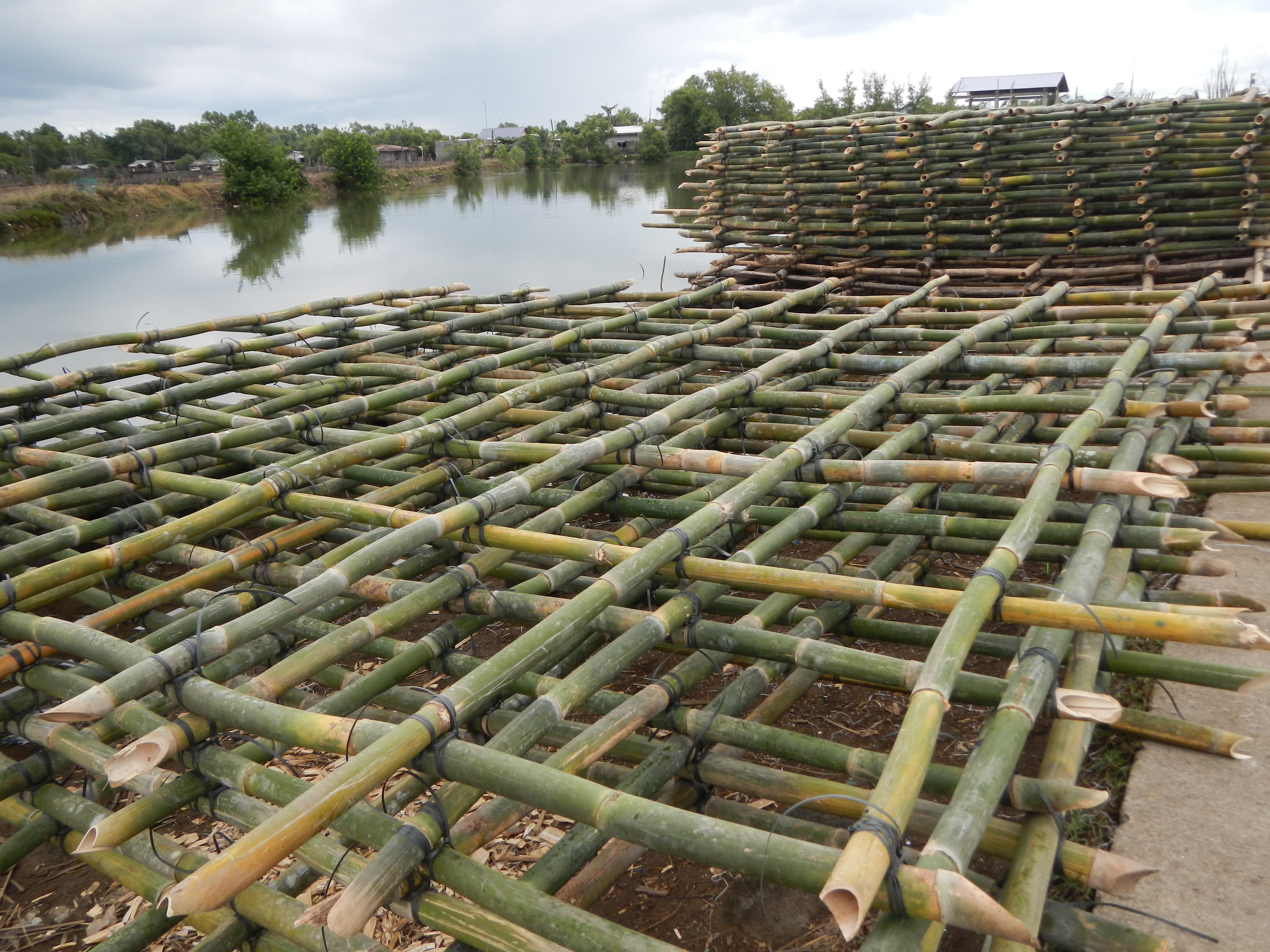
Bamboo raft used for mussel breeding and propagation (Abucay, Bataan, Philippines)

Using a remotely-operated submersible to inspect mussel longlines in New Zealand

=== Harvest ===
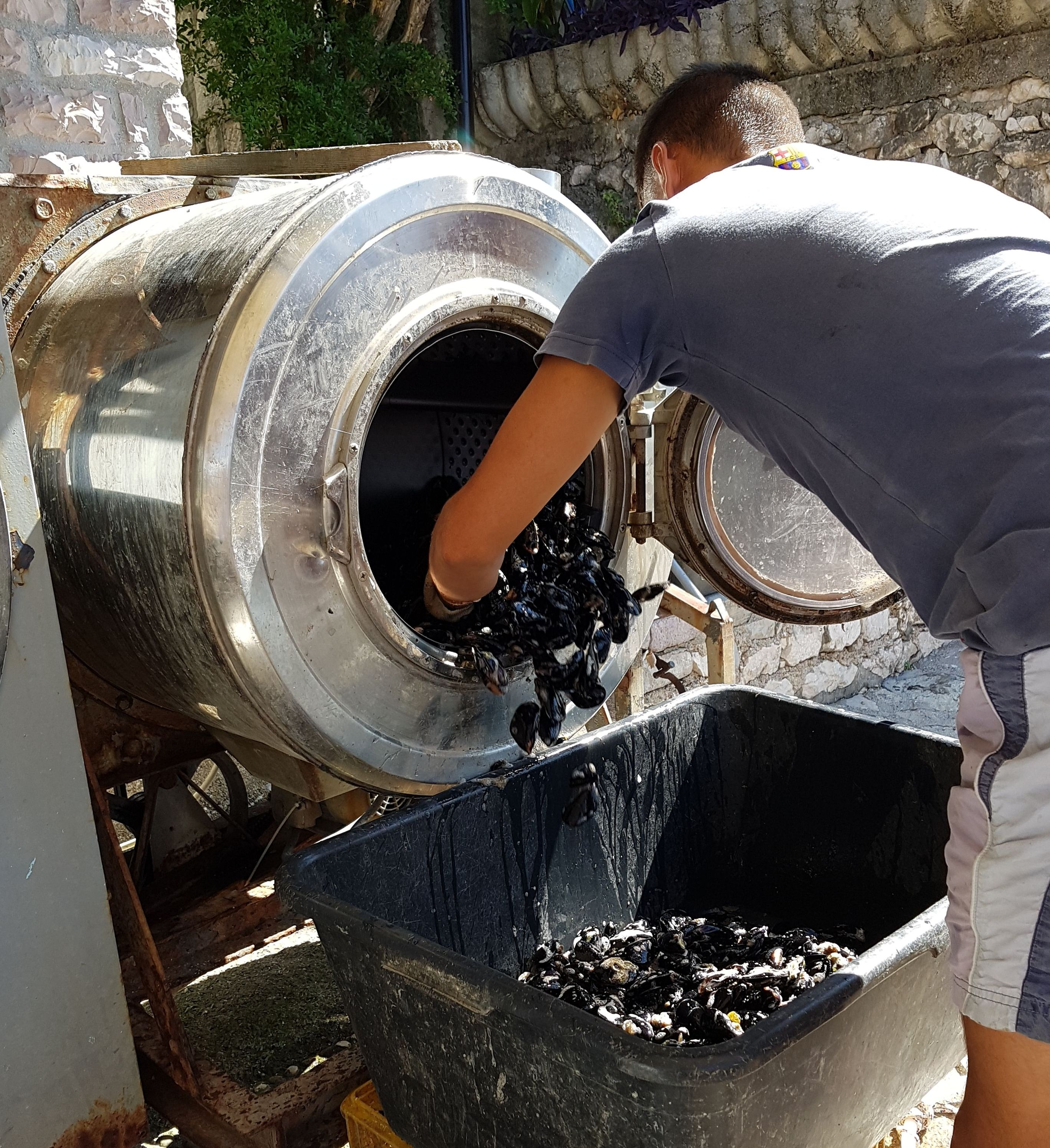
Cleaning mussels in a mussel farm (Bay of Kotor, Montenegro)

In roughly 12–15 months, mussels reach marketable size (40mm) and are ready for harvest. Harvesting methods depend on the grow-out area and the rearing method being used. Dredges are currently used for on-bottom culture. Mussels grown on wooden poles can be harvested by hand or with a hydraulic powered system. For raft and longline culture, a platform is typically lowered under the mussel lines, which are then cut from the system and brought to the surface and dumped into containers on a nearby vessel. After harvest, mussels are typically placed in seawater tanks to rid them of impurities before marketing.

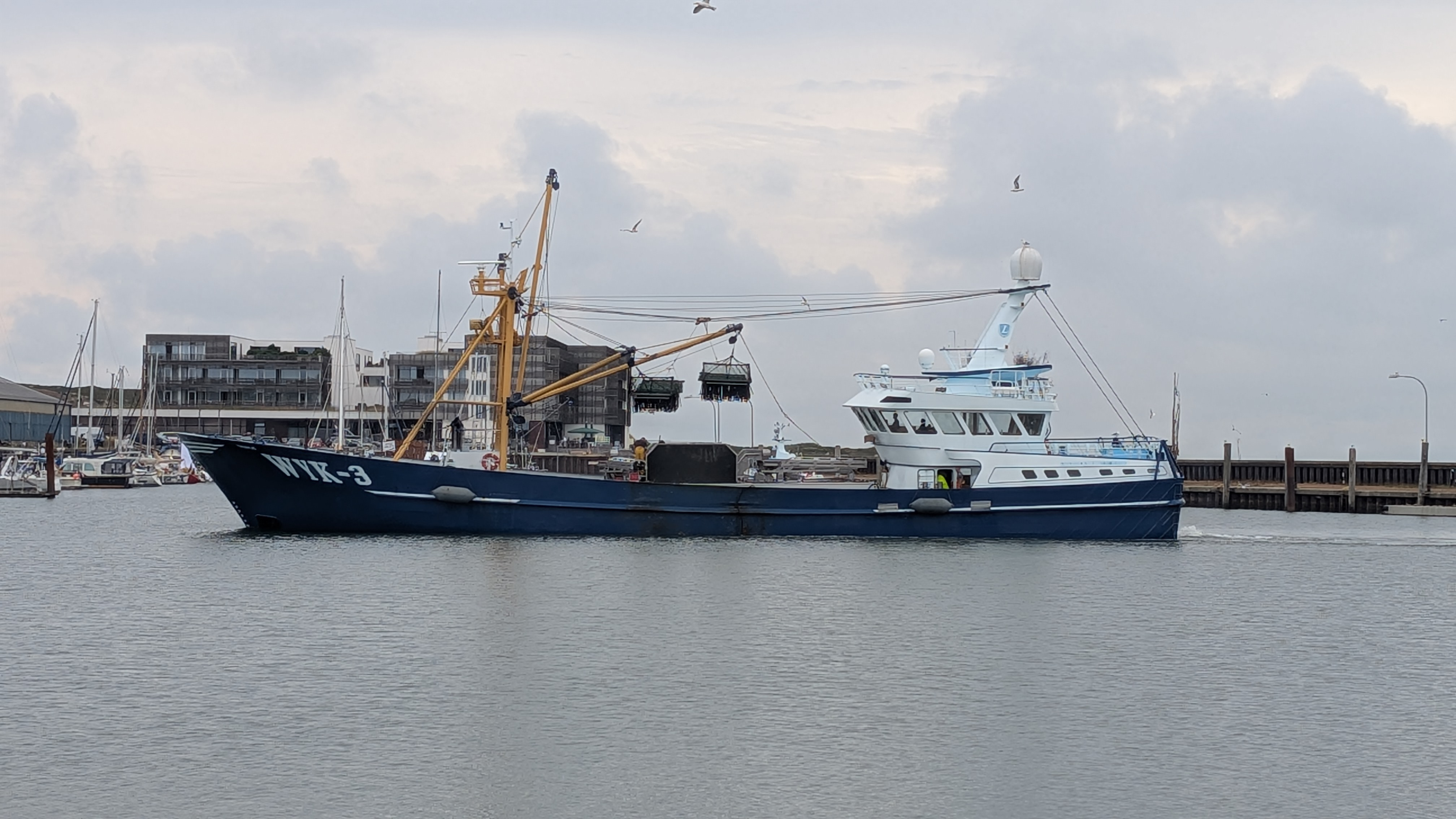
Mussel cutter Trijntje (registration WYK3) in the port of Hörnum, Sylt, Germany

== Mussel-inspired materials ==
Byssus threads secreted by the large and now critically endangered Mediterranean pen shell, Pinna nobilis, which can be up to 6 cm (2.4 in) in length, have historically been made into cloth. Byssus cloth is a rare fabric, also known as sea silk, that is made using the byssus of pen shells as the fiber source. The byssus of Atrina pectinata, a shell of the same family, has been used in Sardinia as a substitute for critically endangered Pinna nobilis, to weave sea silk.

Byssal threads, used to anchor mussels to substrates, are now recognized as superior bonding agents. A number of studies have investigated mussel "glues" for industrial and surgical applications. Further, mussel adhesive proteins inspired the design of peptide mimics that were well studied for surface bioengineering of medical implants. Self-assembling mussel-inspired peptides were also shown to form functional nanostructures. Also, a peptide derived from mussel foot protein-5, a key protein in mussel adhesion, displayed antibacterial properties and served as inspiration for the design of a new class of peptide-based antibacterial adhesive hydrogels, which are active against drug-resistant Gram-positive bacteria.

Additionally byssal threads have provided insight into the construction of artificial tendons.

== Environmental applications ==
Mussels are widely used as bio-indicators to monitor the health of aquatic environments in both fresh water and the marine environments. They are particularly useful since they are distributed worldwide and they are sessile. These characteristics ensure that they are representative of the environment where they are sampled or placed. Their population status or structure, physiology, behaviour or the level of contamination with elements or compounds can indicate the status of the ecosystem. Transplanted caged mussels were used in a study to monitor heavy metal contamination in coastal waters.

== Mussels and nutrient mitigation ==
Marine nutrient bioextraction is the practice of farming and harvesting marine organisms such as shellfish and seaweed for the purpose of reducing nutrient pollution. Mussels and other bivalve shellfish consume phytoplankton containing nutrients such as nitrogen (N) and phosphorus (P). On average, one live mussel is 1.0% N and 0.1% P. When the mussels are harvested and removed, these nutrients are also removed from the system and recycled in the form of seafood or mussel biomass, which can be used as an organic fertilizer or animal feed-additive. These ecosystem services provided by mussels are of particular interest to those hoping to mitigate excess anthropogenic marine nutrients, particularly in eutrophic marine systems. While mussel aquaculture is actually promoted in some countries such as Sweden as a water management strategy to address coastal eutrophication, mussel farming as a nutrient mitigation tool is still in its infancy in most parts of the world. Ongoing efforts in the Baltic Sea (Denmark, Sweden, Germany, Poland) and Long Island Sound and Puget Sound in the U.S. are currently examining nutrient uptake, cost-effectiveness, and potential environmental impacts of mussel farming as a means to mitigate excess nutrients and complement traditional wastewater treatment programs.

== Conservation ==
=== Freshwater mussels ===
Out of 511 species assessed globally, 44% of freshwater mussels listed on the IUCN Red List are classified at some level of threatened.

There are 297 known freshwater mussel taxa in the United States and Canada, which are home to the most diverse freshwater mussel fauna in the world, especially in the southeastern United States. Of the 297 known species, 213 (71.7%) taxa are listed as endangered, threatened, or of special concern. Approximately 37 North American species were considered extinct in 2004.

Out of 16 recognized freshwater mussel species in Europe, 12 are considered threatened, with varying statuses from Near Threatened to Critically Endangered. 8 species are protected by the European Union Habitats Directive across all annexes.

There are approximately 85 known species in Africa, 102 in Central America, 74 in South America, 228 in Asia (with the highest species diversity in Southeast Asia), and 33 in Australasia. The species in these areas are not as well researched as in North America and Europe. Approximately 61% of freshwater mussels in Asia had not been assessed and conservation efforts were almost non-existent. No Asian mussels were protected internationally under legislation such as CITES.

The main factors contributing to the decline of freshwater mussels include destruction by dams, increased siltation, channel alteration and the introduction of invasive species such as the zebra mussel.

== As food ==
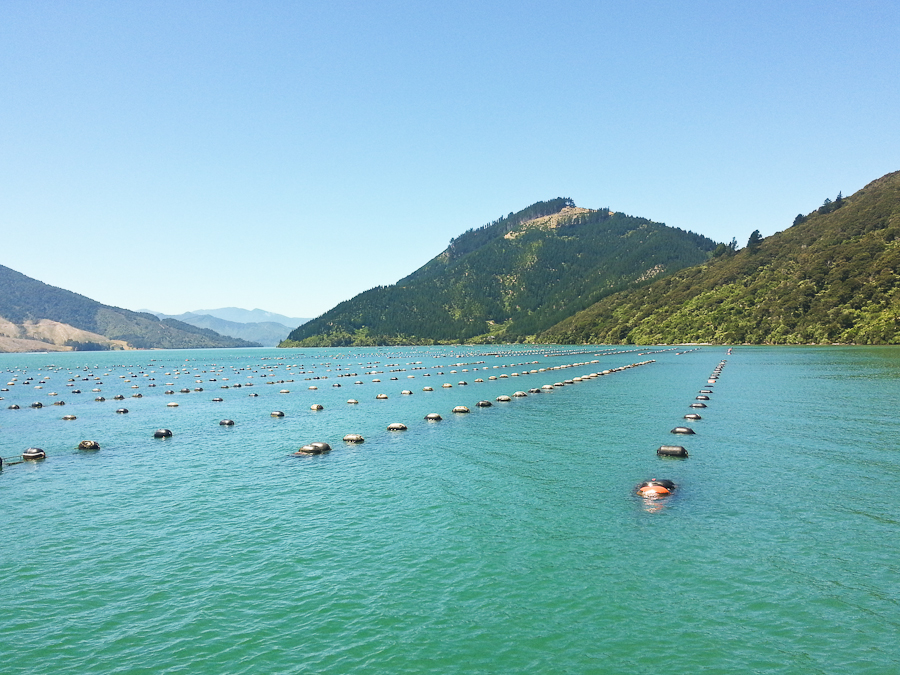
Mussel farm, New Zealand.

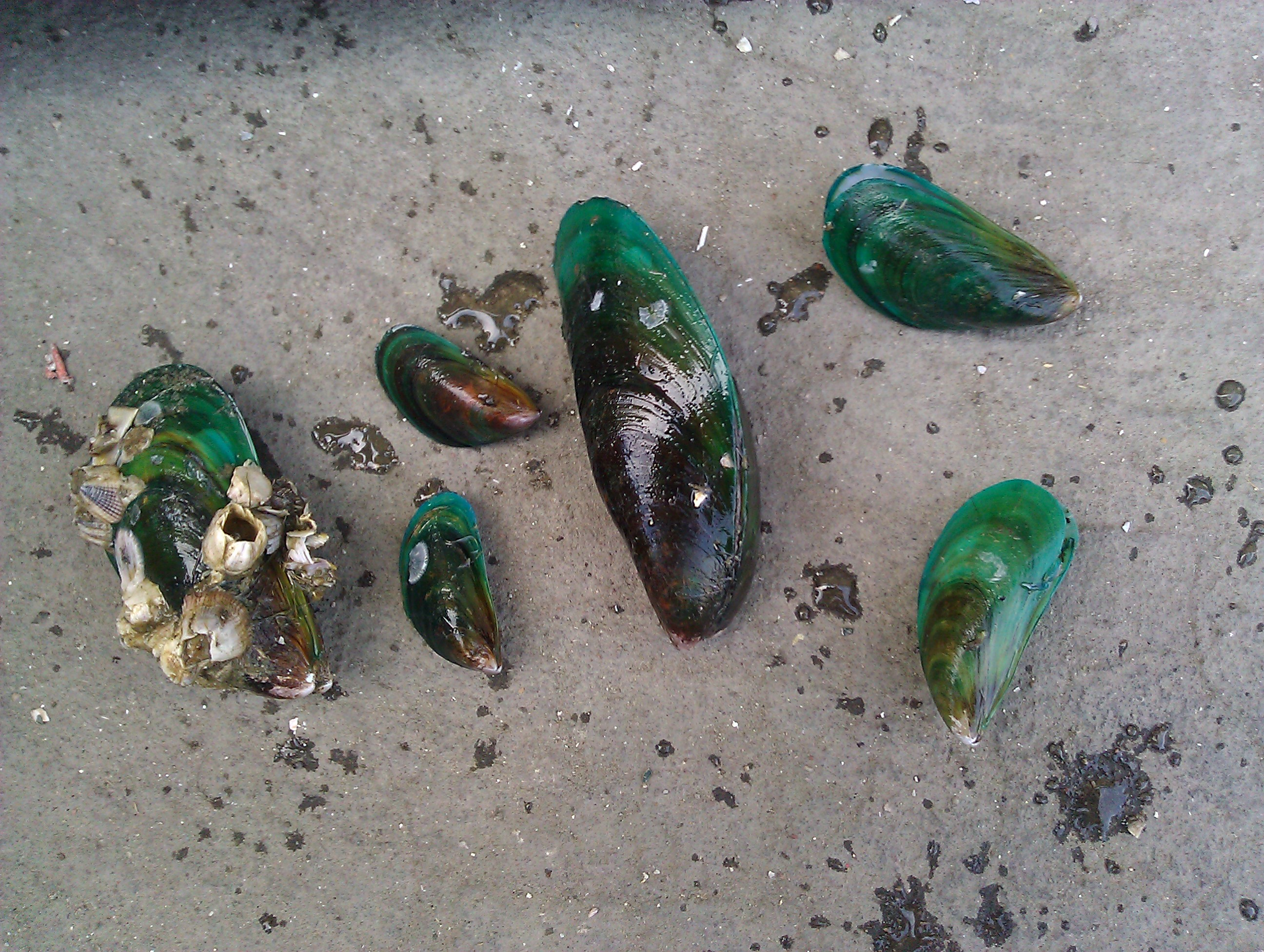
The Asian green mussel, Perna viridis, gathered in Chonburi Province, Thailand

Humans have used mussels as food for thousands of years. About 17 species are edible, of which the most commonly eaten are Mytilus edulis, M. galloprovincialis, M. trossulus and Perna canaliculus. Although freshwater mussels are edible, today they are widely considered unpalatable and are rarely consumed. Freshwater mussels were once eaten extensively by native peoples of North America and some still do today.

In the United States during the Second World War, mussels were commonly served in diners and restaurants across the country. This was due to wartime rationing and shortages of red meat, such as beef and pork. Mussels became a popular substitute for most meats (with the exception of poultry).

A bowl of traditionally prepared Dutch mosselen

In Belgium, the Netherlands, and France, mussels are consumed with French fries (mosselen met friet or moules-frites) or bread. In Belgium, mussels are sometimes served with fresh herbs and flavorful vegetables in a stock of butter and white wine. Fries and Belgian beer are sometimes accompaniments. A similar style of preparation is commonly found in the Rhineland where mussels are customarily served in restaurants with a side of dark bread during the winter months. In the Netherlands, mussels are sometimes served fried in batter or breadcrumbs, particularly at take-out food outlets or informal settings. In France, the Éclade des Moules, or, locally, Terré de Moules, is a mussel bake that can be found along the beaches of the Bay of Biscay.

In Italy, mussels are mixed with other seafood; they are most commonly eaten steamed, sometimes with white wine, herbs, and served with the remaining water and some lemon. In Spain, they are consumed mostly steamed, sometimes boiling, with white wine, onion and herbs, and served with the remaining water and some lemon. They can also be eaten as tigres, a sort of croquette using the mussel meat, shrimps and other pieces of fish in a thick bechamel then breaded and fried in the clean mussel shell. They are used in other sorts of dishes, including rice dishes and soups, and are commonly eaten canned in a pickling brine made of oil, vinegar, peppercorns, bay leaves and paprika (escabeche).

In Turkey, mussels are either covered with flour and fried on skewers (midye tava), or filled with rice and served cold (midye dolma) and are usually consumed after alcohol (mostly raki or beer).

Mussels are used in Ireland boiled and seasoned with vinegar, with the "bray" or boiling water as a supplementary hot drink.

In Cantonese cuisine, mussels are cooked in a broth of garlic and fermented black bean. In New Zealand, they are served in a chilli or garlic-based vinaigrette, processed into fritters and fried, or used as the base for a chowder.

In Brazil, it is common to see mussels being cooked and served with olive oil, usually accompanied by onion, garlic and other herbs. The plate is very popular among tourists and low classes, probably because of the hot climate that favours mussels reproduction.

In India, mussels are popular in Kerala, Maharashtra, Karnataka-Bhatkal, and Goa. They are either prepared with drumsticks, breadfruit or other vegetables, or filled with rice and coconut paste with spices and served hot. Fried mussels ('Kadukka' കടുക്ക in Malayalam) of north Kerala especially in Thalassery are a spicy, favored delicacy. In coastal Karnataka Bearys prepare special rice balls stuffed with spicy fried mussels and steamed, locally known as "pachilede pindi".

Mussels are one of the few animals that some vegans and vegetarians will eat, based on the idea that being bivalves, and lacking a central nervous system, they cannot feel pain, a philosophy known as bivalve veganism. However, this is controversial, and strict vegans and vegetarians will not eat them.

=== Preparation ===
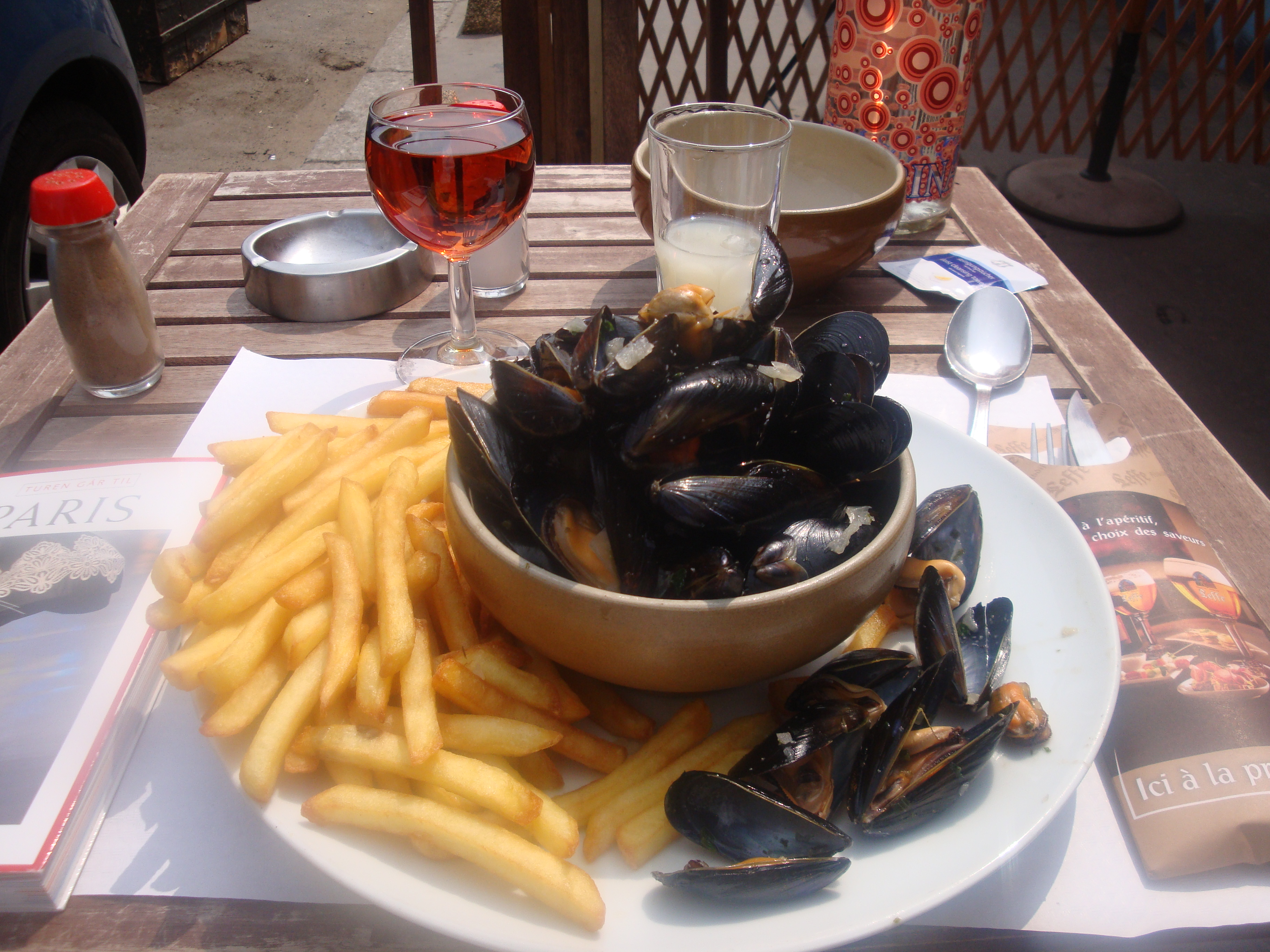
Moules-frites

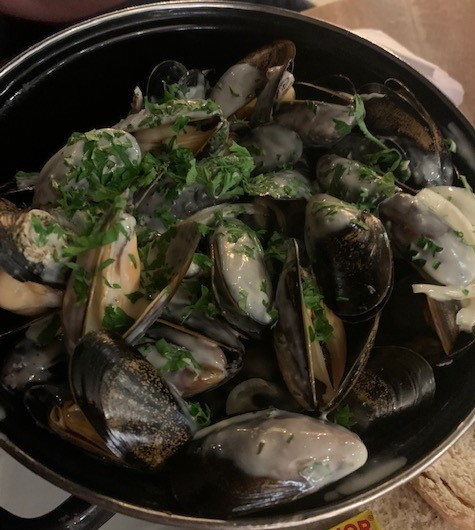
Scottish mussels

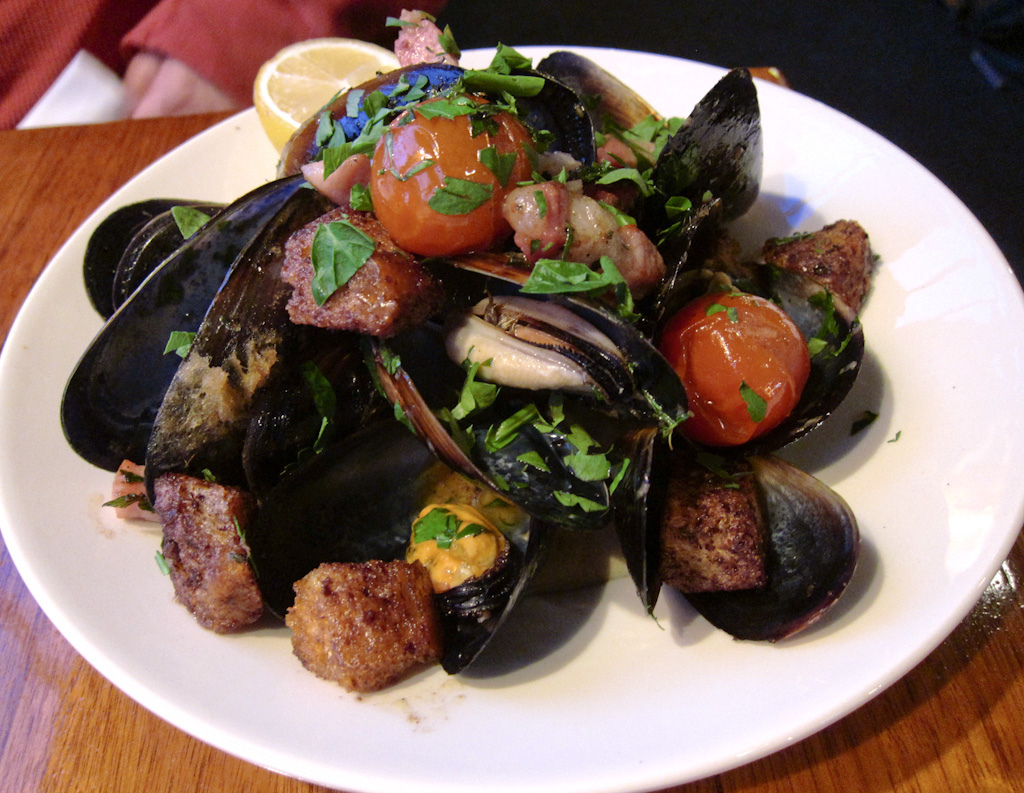
A mussel dish with cherry tomatoes and croutons

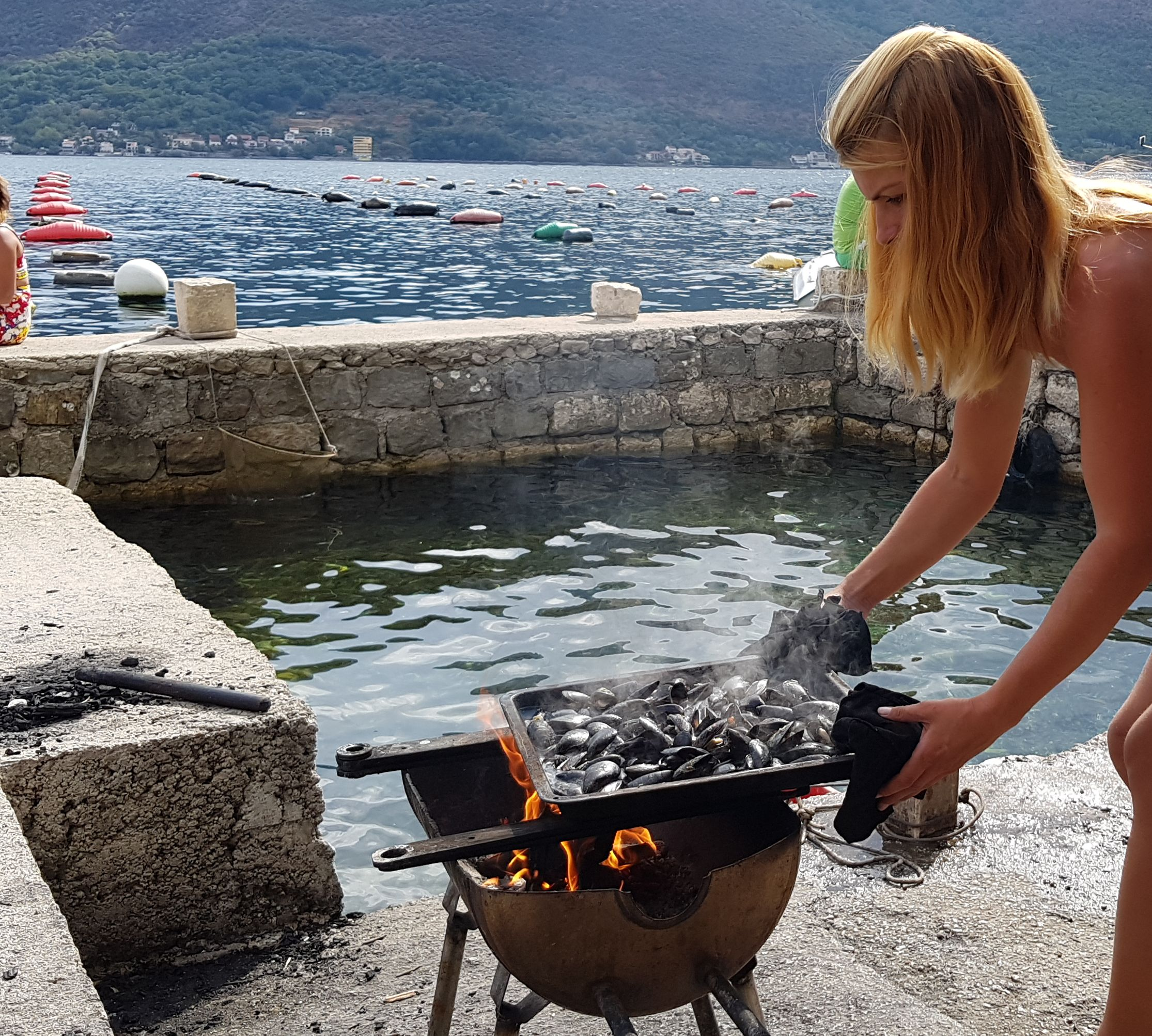
Simple mussels roasting in a mussel farm (Bay of Kotor, Montenegro).

Mussels can be smoked, boiled, steamed, roasted, barbecued or fried in butter or vegetable oil. They can be used in soups, salads and sauces. As with all shellfish, except shrimp, mussels should be checked to ensure they are still alive just before they are cooked; enzymes quickly break down the meat and make them unpalatable or poisonous after dying or uncooked. Some mussels might contain toxins. A simple criterion is that live mussels, when in the air, will shut tightly when disturbed. Open, unresponsive mussels are dead, and must be discarded. Unusually heavy, wild-caught, closed mussels may be discarded as they may contain only mud or sand. (They can be tested by slightly opening the shell halves.) A thorough rinse in water and removal of "the beard" is suggested. Mussel shells usually open when cooked, revealing the cooked soft parts. Historically, it has been assumed that after cooking all the mussels should have opened and those that have not are not safe to eat and should be discarded. However, according to marine biologist Nick Ruello, this advice may have arisen from an old, poorly researched cookbook's advice, which has now been deemed common sense for all shellfish. Ruello found 11.5% of all mussels failed to open during cooking, but when forced open, 100% were "both adequately cooked and safe to eat."

Although mussels are valued as food, mussel poisoning due to toxic planktonic organisms can be a danger along some coastlines. For instance, mussels should be avoided during the warmer months along the west coast of the United States. This poisoning is usually due to a bloom of dinoflagellates (red tides), which contain toxins. The dinoflagellates and their toxin are harmless to mussels, even when concentrated by the mussel's filter feeding, but the concentrated toxins cause serious illness if the mussels are consumed by humans, including paralytic shellfish poisoning.

=== Nutrition highlights ===
Raw blue mussels
| Serving size | 3 ounces (85 g) |
| Calories | 70 |
| Protein | 10.1 g |
| Carbohydrate | 3.1 g |
| Fiber | 0.0 g |
| Total fat | 1.9 g |
| Saturated fat | 0.4 g |
| Sodium | 243 mg |

- Excellent source of: selenium (44.8 μg), and vitamin B12 (12 μg)
- Good source of: zinc (1.6 mg), and folate (42 μg)

Foods that are an "excellent source" of a particular nutrient provide 20% or more of the recommended daily value. Foods that are a "good source" of a particular nutrient provide between 10 and 20% of the recommended daily value.

== See also ==
- California mussel
- Dwarf wedgemussel
- Brachiopod
- Clam
- Geoduck
- Oyster
- Scallop
- Water purification
