= Choromytilus palliopunctatus =

Scientific classification
- Kingdom: Animalia
- Phylum: Mollusca
- Class: Bivalvia
- Order: Mytilida
- Family: Mytilidae
- Genus: Choromytilus
- Species: C. palliopunctatus

Binomial name
- Choromytilus palliopunctatus Carpenter, 1857

Synonyms
- Mytilus palliopunctatus Carpenter, 1857; Mytilus tenuiaratus Carpenter, 1857

Species of bivalve

Choromytilus palliopunctatus, the pinpricked mussel, is a species of bivalve in the family Mytilidae. The scientific name of the species was first validly published in 1857 by Philip Pearsall Carpenter.
