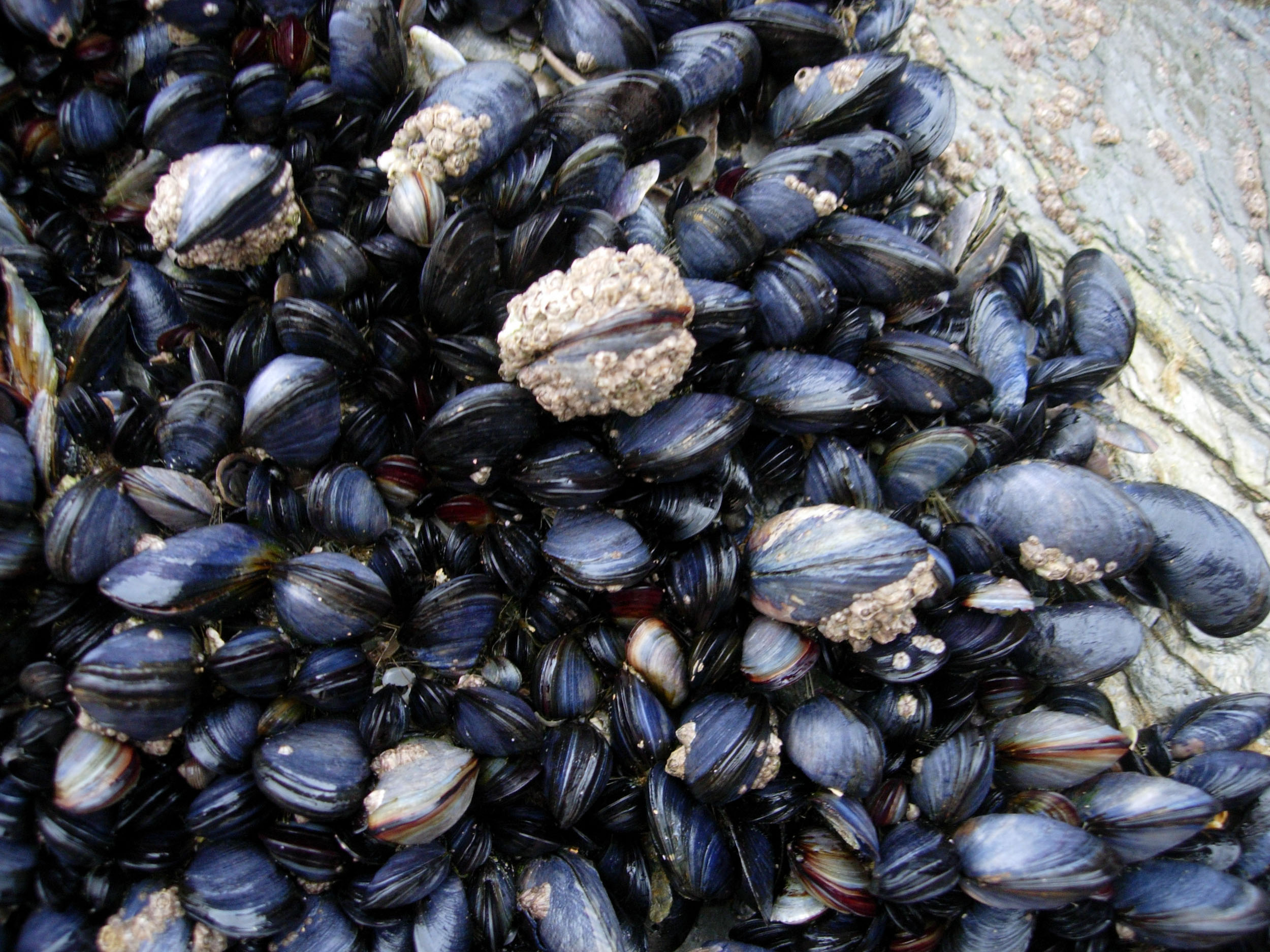
- Mytilus edulis in the intertidal zone in Cornwall, England

Scientific classification
- Kingdom: Animalia
- Phylum: Mollusca
- Class: Bivalvia
- Order: Mytilida
- Family: Mytilidae
- Subfamily: Mytilinae
- Genus: Mytilus; Linnaeus, 1758

Type species
- Mytilus edulis Linnaeus, 1758

Species
- See text

= Mytilus (bivalve) =

Mytilus Temporal range: Triassic–Present

Genus of bivalves

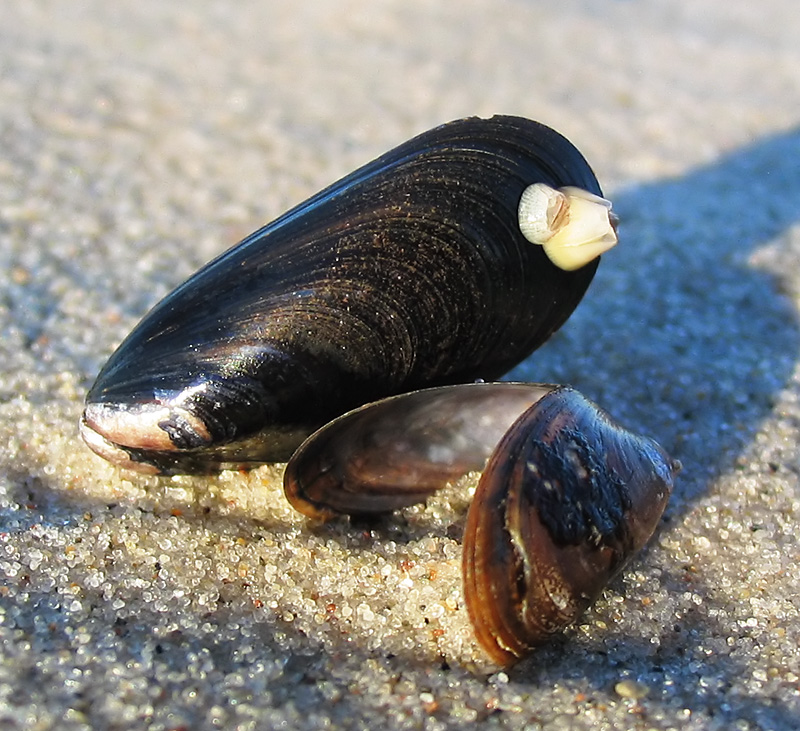
Mytilus edulis shells washed up on the beach

Mytilus is a cosmopolitan genus of medium to large-sized edible, mainly saltwater mussels, marine bivalve molluscs in the family Mytilidae.

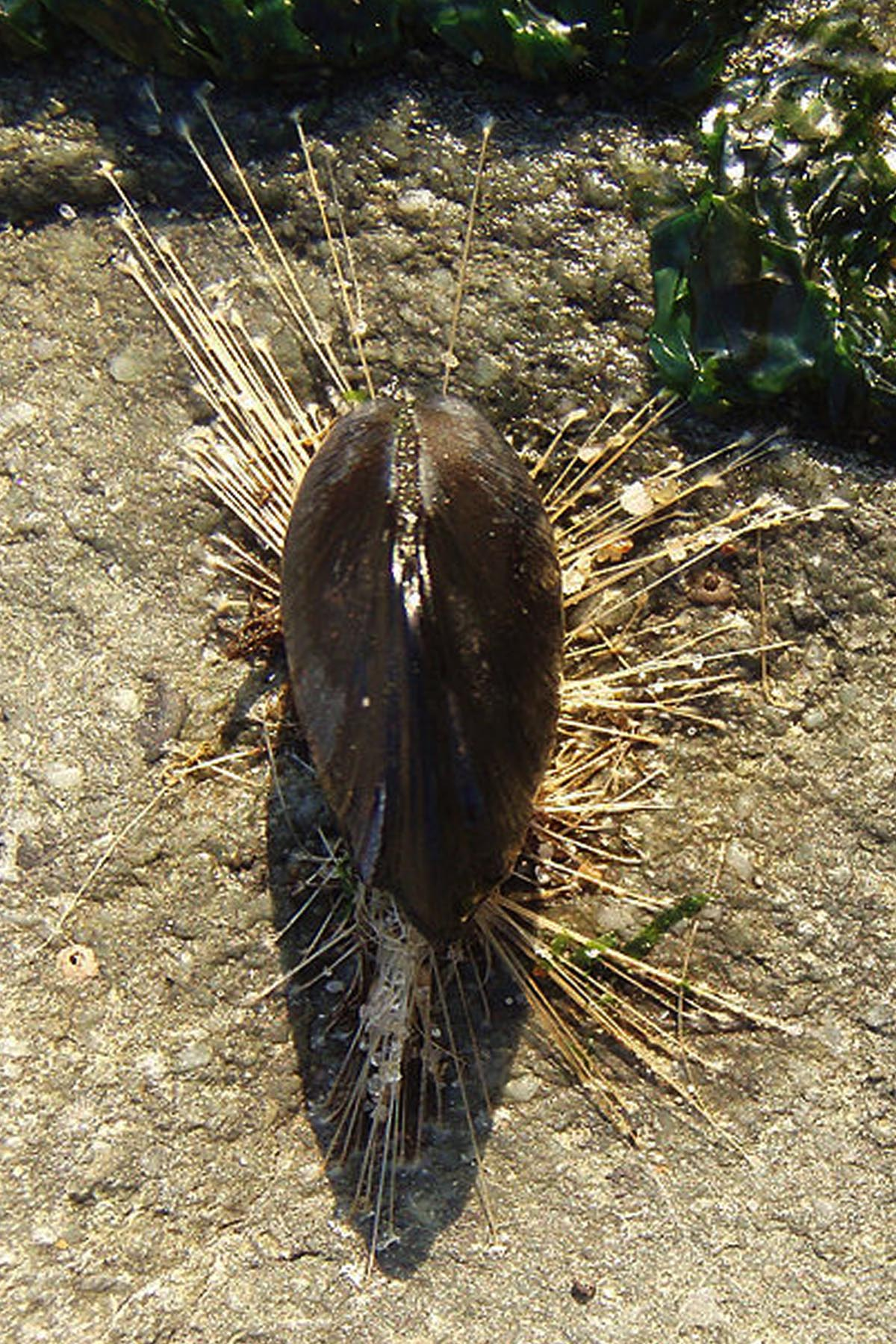
Mytilus mussel in California, showing the byssus threads

== Description ==
Mussels have a gray to blue-purple, fully grown shell about 5 to 10 centimeters long with an elongated oval shape. They follow the general blueprint of the mussels. They consist of a right and left half of the shell, which are held together with an elastic lock strap (ligament). The shell is made up of 3 layers: the top layer of organic material (periostracum), the middle thick layer of lime (ostracum) and the innermost, valuable, silver-white shiny mother-of-pearl layer (hypostracum). In the shell of the mussel there are two gills with gill leaves that are well supplied with blood. Between the gills is a muscular foot with the byssus gland. With the help of the protein contained in the mussel and iron filtered from the sea, this gland produces the byssus threads with which the mussel can hold on. Mussels have a sphincter, which is located in the soft tissue of the mussel, as well as other organs (heart, stomach, intestines, kidneys). With the help of the sphincter muscle, the mussel can close in danger or dryness.

== Species ==
Species within the genus Mytilus include:

- Mytilus californianus Conrad, 1837 - California mussel
- Mytilus coruscus Gould, 1861 = M. unguiculatus Valenciennes, 1858
- the Mytilus edulis complex:
  - Mytilus edulis Linnaeus, 1758 - blue mussel, edible blue mussel
  - Mytilus galloprovincialis Lamarck, 1819 - Mediterranean mussel
  - Mytilus planulatus Lamarck, 1826 - Australian blue mussel
  - Mytilus platensis d'Orbigny, 1842
  - Mytilus chilensis Hupe, 1854 - Chilean blue mussel
  - Mytilus trossulus Gould, 1850 - foolish mussel

Numerous fossil species are known, the oldest dating to the Triassic.

== Feeding ==
Mussels are filter feeders. They have two openings. The water enters the mantle cavity through the inflow opening, in which a permanent flow of water is generated by the eyelashes. The tiny food particles (plant and animal plankton) stick to the mucous layer of the gills. Then the eyelash hairs convey the mucus in the gills with the food particles to the mouth of the mussel and from there to the stomach and intestines, where the food is ultimately digested. The indigestible residues are expelled from the outflow opening with the respiratory water.

== Reproduction ==
Each spring and summer, the females lay five to ten million eggs, which are then fertilized by the males. The fertilized egg cells become trochophoral larvae, 99.9 percent of which are eaten in the course of their four-week development into young mussels. Nevertheless, after this "selection" there are still around 10,000 young mussels left. These are about three millimeters in size and often drift around several hundred kilometers in the sea before they are about five centimeters in size in coastal regions with their byssus threads. The reason mussels live in such large colonies (also called banks) is because it gives the males a much greater chance of fertilizing eggs. After the larvae have developed freely floating as plankton for about four weeks, they attach themselves to stones, stakes, shill, sand and other mussels with byssus threads. They prefer the brackish water from estuaries and mud flats in the coastal regions.

== Human use ==
Mytilus mussels are widely exploited as food and used in mariculture. Historic evidence of human consumption of mussels dates to the Middle Pleistocene. Mussel have been among the primary mollusc remains recovered at coastal Mousterian Neanderthal sites such as the Gorham's Cave complex in Gibraltar and the Gruta da Figueira Brava, in Portugal. Aurignacian levels from Cova Foradà also show extensive consumption of mussels, alongside the presence of shell ornaments. In California, mussels have been consumed by coastal Native American people for almost 12,000 years.

Antimicrobial peptides called Mytilin A and B have been isolated from M. galloprovincialis and M. edulis.
