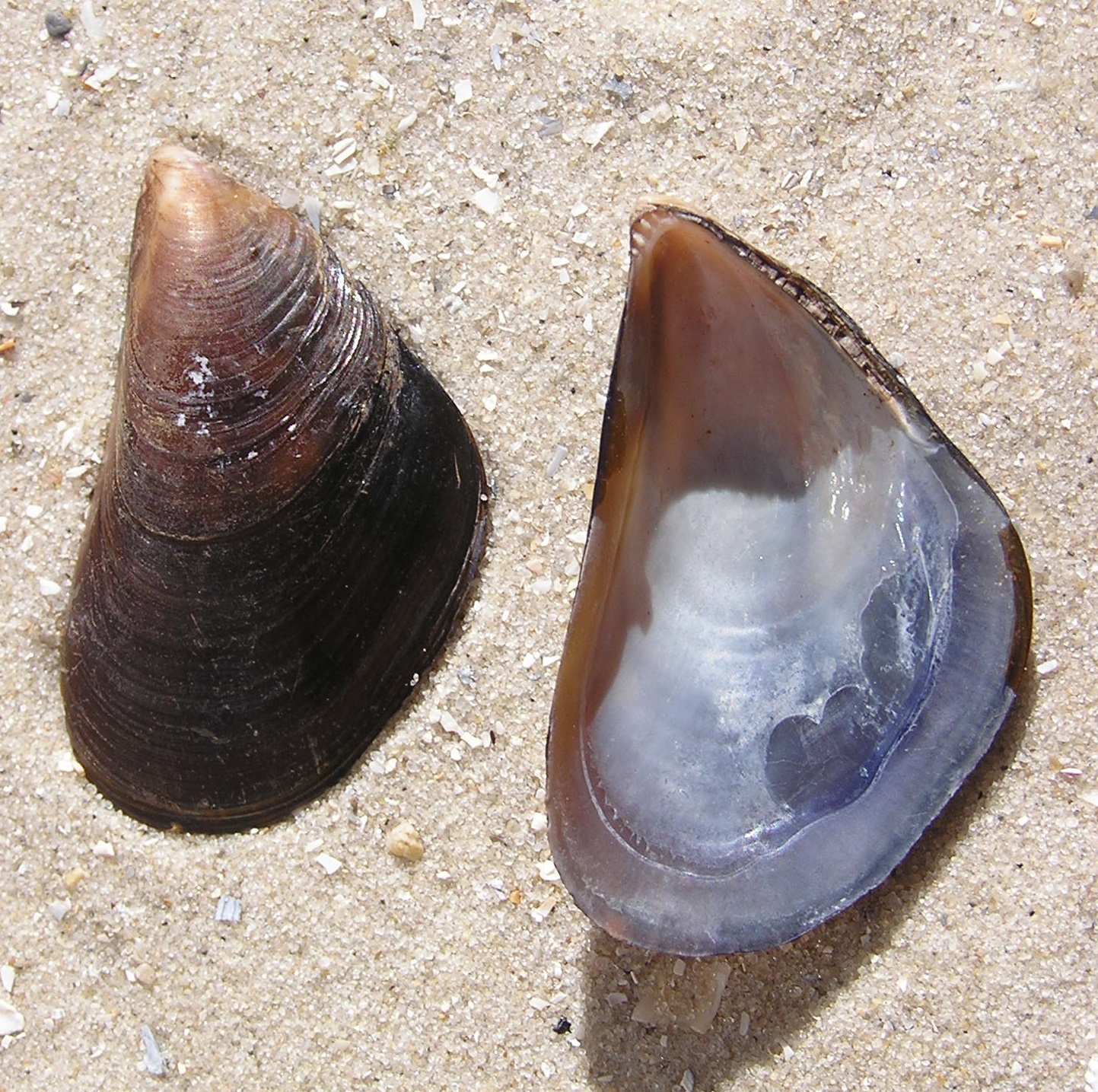
- Two valves of Mytilus galloprovincialis

Scientific classification
- Kingdom: Animalia
- Phylum: Mollusca
- Class: Bivalvia
- Order: Mytilida
- Family: Mytilidae
- Genus: Mytilus
- Species: M. galloprovincialis

Binomial name
- Mytilus galloprovincialis Lamarck, 1819

= Mediterranean mussel =

Species of bivalve

Capture (blue) and aquaculture (green) production of Mediterranean mussel (Mytilus galloprovincialis) in thousand tonnes from 1950 to 2022, as reported by the FAO

The Mediterranean mussel (Mytilus galloprovincialis) is a species of bivalve, a marine mollusc in the family Mytilidae. It is an invasive species in many parts of the world, and also an object of aquaculture.

== Systematics ==
Mytilus galloprovincialis is one of the three principal, closely related species in the Mytilus edulis complex of blue mussels, which collectively are widely distributed on the temperate to subarctic coasts of both the Northern and Southern Hemispheres, and often are dominant inhabitants on hard substrates of the intertidal and nearshore habitats. M. galloprovincialis will often hybridize with its sister taxa, the closely related Mytilus edulis and Mytilus trossulus, when they are found in the same locality. M. galloprovincialis is considered the most warm-water-tolerant species of the three, and has the most southerly distribution in Europe and North America.

Right and left valve of the same specimen:

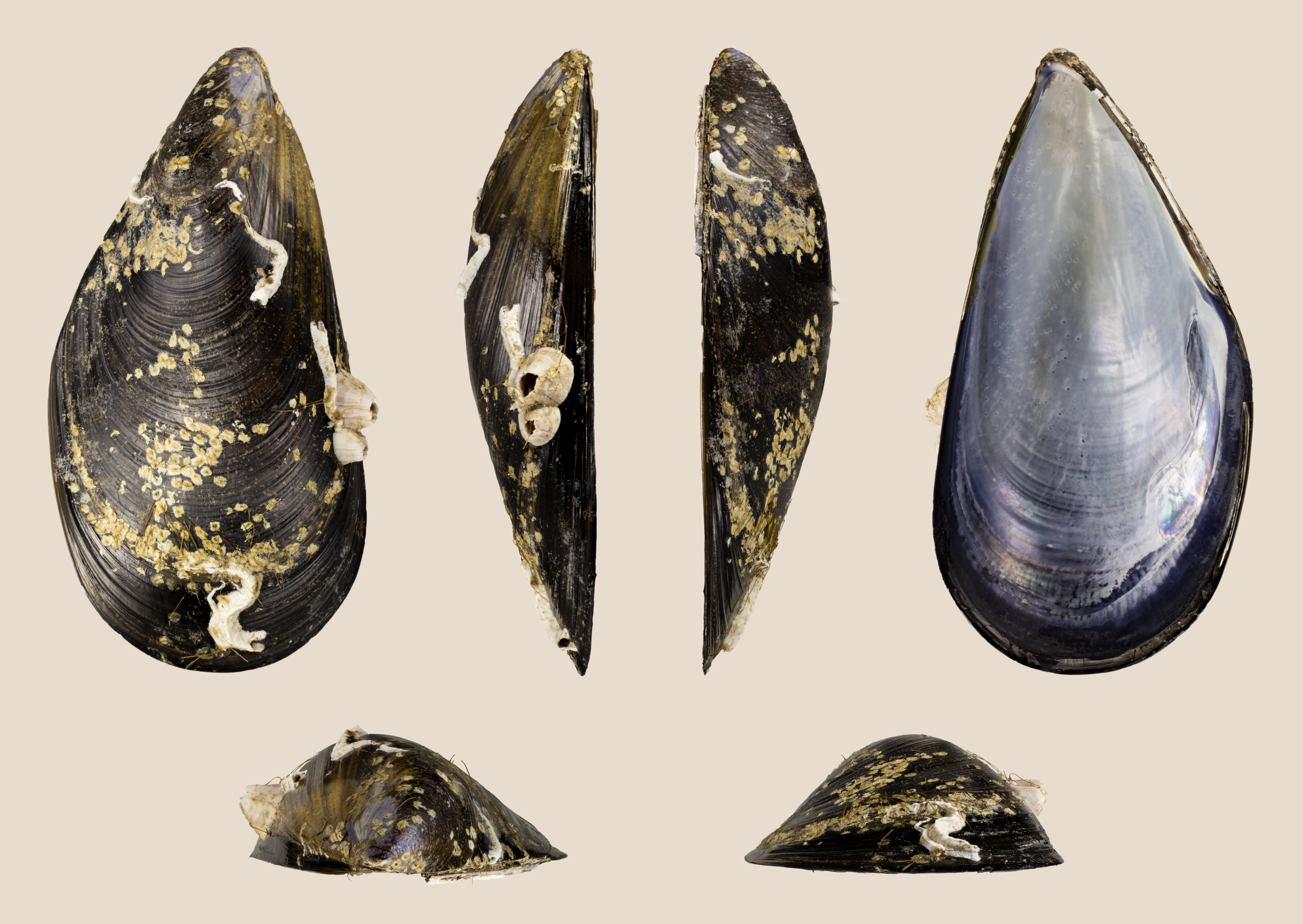
Right valve

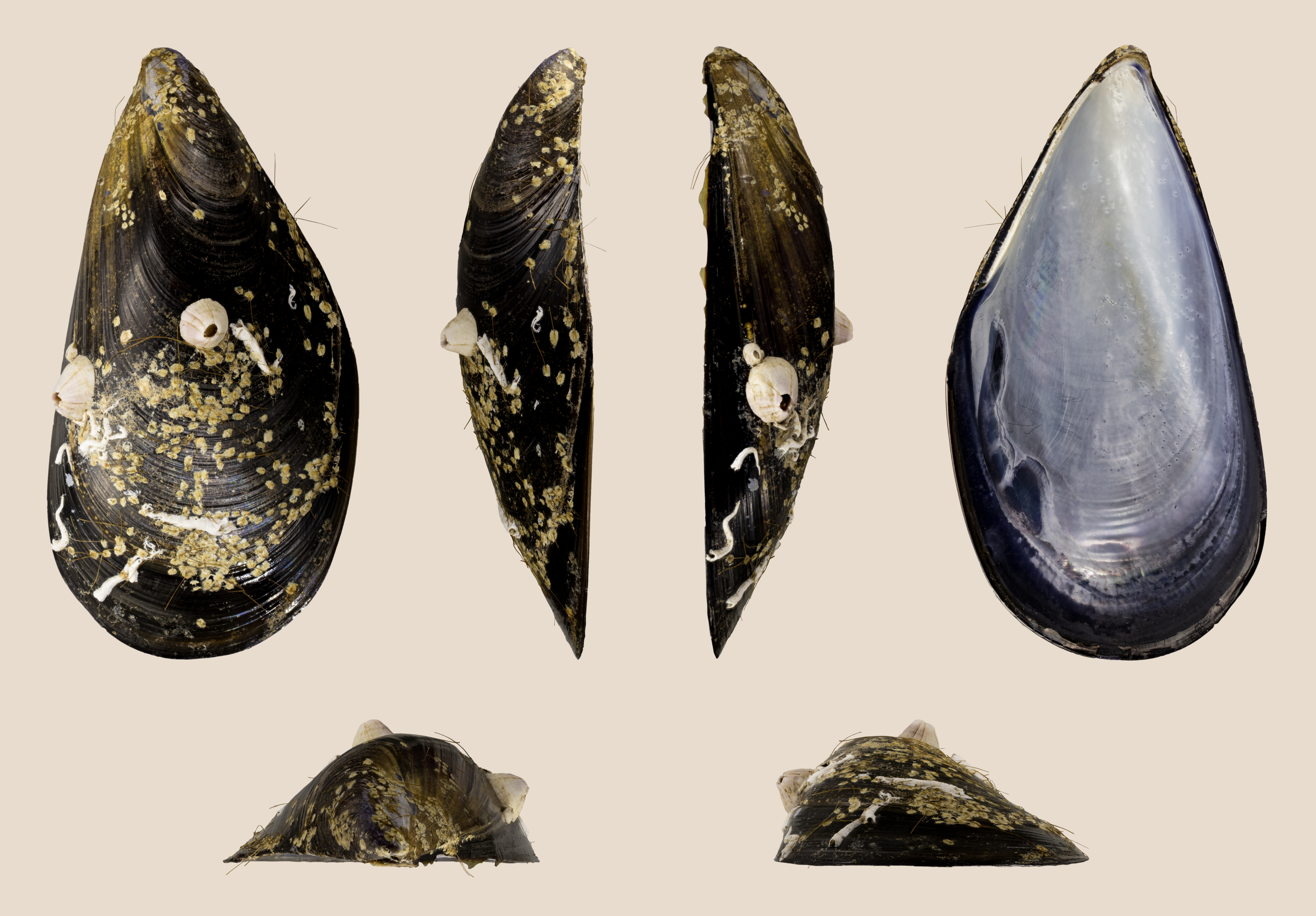
Left valve

Mytilus galloprovincialis dilatatus

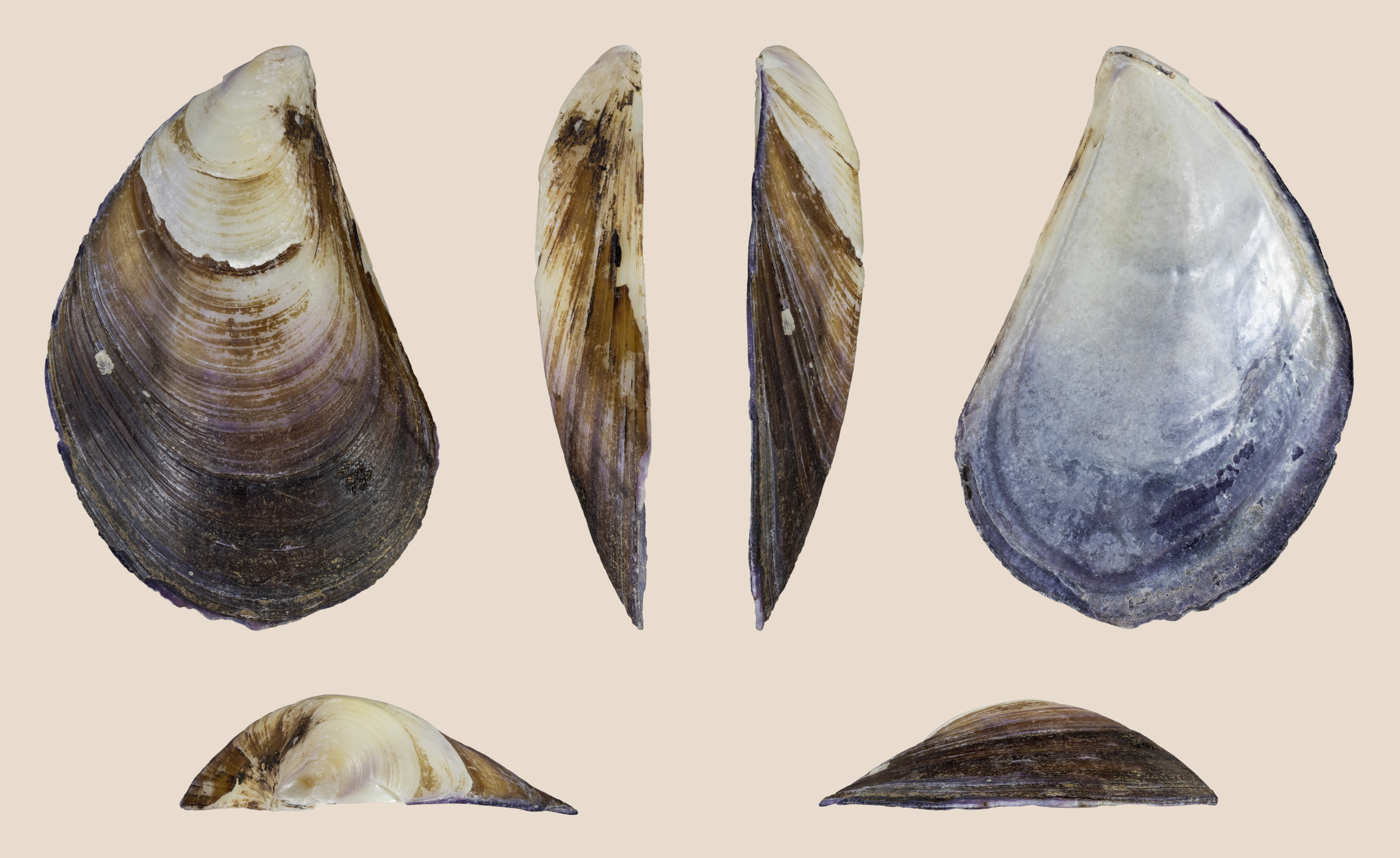
Right valve

Mytilus galloprovincialis trigonus

Right valve

Left valve

== Distribution ==
In Europe, Mytilus galloprovincialis is found in the Mediterranean Sea and the Black Sea, and on the Atlantic coasts, in Portugal, north to France and the British Isles and Norway. Recently this species has also been found in the European Arctic including northern Norway and Svalbard.

In the northern Pacific the species is found along the coast of California, where it was introduced from Europe by human activity in the early 20th century, and also in the Puget Sound region of Washington state, where it has been subject to aquaculture. It is also present as an invasive species on the Asian coast throughout Japan, including Ryukyu Islands, as well as in North Korea and around Vladivostok in Russia.

Mytilus galloprovincialis is also present as a native lineage in parts of the Southern Hemisphere. In addition there are populations introduced from the north recently with human activity. These lineages are distinguished by genetic characters. No original Mytilus populations lived in southern Africa, but the Mediterranean mussel was introduced from Europe in 1984 and is now the dominant low intertidal mussel on the West Coast. The distribution spans an area from the Namibian border to Port Alfred, intertidally to just below the low tide border. M. galloprovincialis is also found in New Zealand, Australia and South America.

== Description ==
This animal grows up to 140 mm in length. It is a smooth-shelled mussel with a slightly broader base than that of the black mussel (Choromytilus meridionalis), with which it is often confused in South Africa. Its shell is blue-violet or black, but may shade to light brown.

== Ecology ==
The Mediterranean mussel is a filter feeder. It is rare subtidally, which is an alternate means of distinguishing it from the black mussel in South Africa.

Mussels are generally considered as a bioindicators of the whole ecosystem in which they live. The immune system of bivalve molluscs is often chosen as a target parameter to evaluate the welfare of the species and of their surrounding environment. In the Adriatic Sea, Chamelea gallina and Mytilus galloprovincialis share similar variations of the cytotoxic activity during the year. The exertions by the hemolymph of the species are considered a useful biomarker of the immune activity and therefore of the health of mussels.

The immune systems of the clam Chamelea gallina and the mussel Mytilus galloprovincialis are influenced by changing environmental parameters such as water acidification, temperature increases and variations in seawater salinity. Those properties describe a typical scenario of the global climate change and bivalve mollusks are considered predictors of its future impact on the health status of both wild and farmed organisms. Multiple stressors, including hyposalinity and heat shock, may significantly affect the metabolic rate, antioxidant enzyme activity, and feeding rate of Mytilus galloprovincialis, suggesting that these mussels may become energy-limited under combined environmental stress.

== Mariculture ==
=== Novigrad Mussel ===
Novigrad Mussel is M. galloprovincialis cultivated in farms in the Novigrad Sea and Novsko Ždrilo in Croatia and product of the Croatian cuisine with European protected designation of origin, conferred by the European Commission. Although the Adriatic Sea is oligotrophic, the estuarine location of Novigrad makes it suitable for aquaculture.

The shell of the Novigrad Mussel has a fan-shaped, triangular, or elongated-oval shape. The body is enclosed by two equal shells, externally black-blueish in color, and internally pale pearly. The length of the longest part of a consumable-sized shellfish is at least 6 cm, while the minimum weight of a shellfish is 20 g. It is particularly known for its high condition index, which is at least 12%. Fresh meat is smooth to the touch, with a soft and elastic consistency, carrying a characteristic scent of the marine algae. The surface of the meat is shiny, moist, and smooth.
