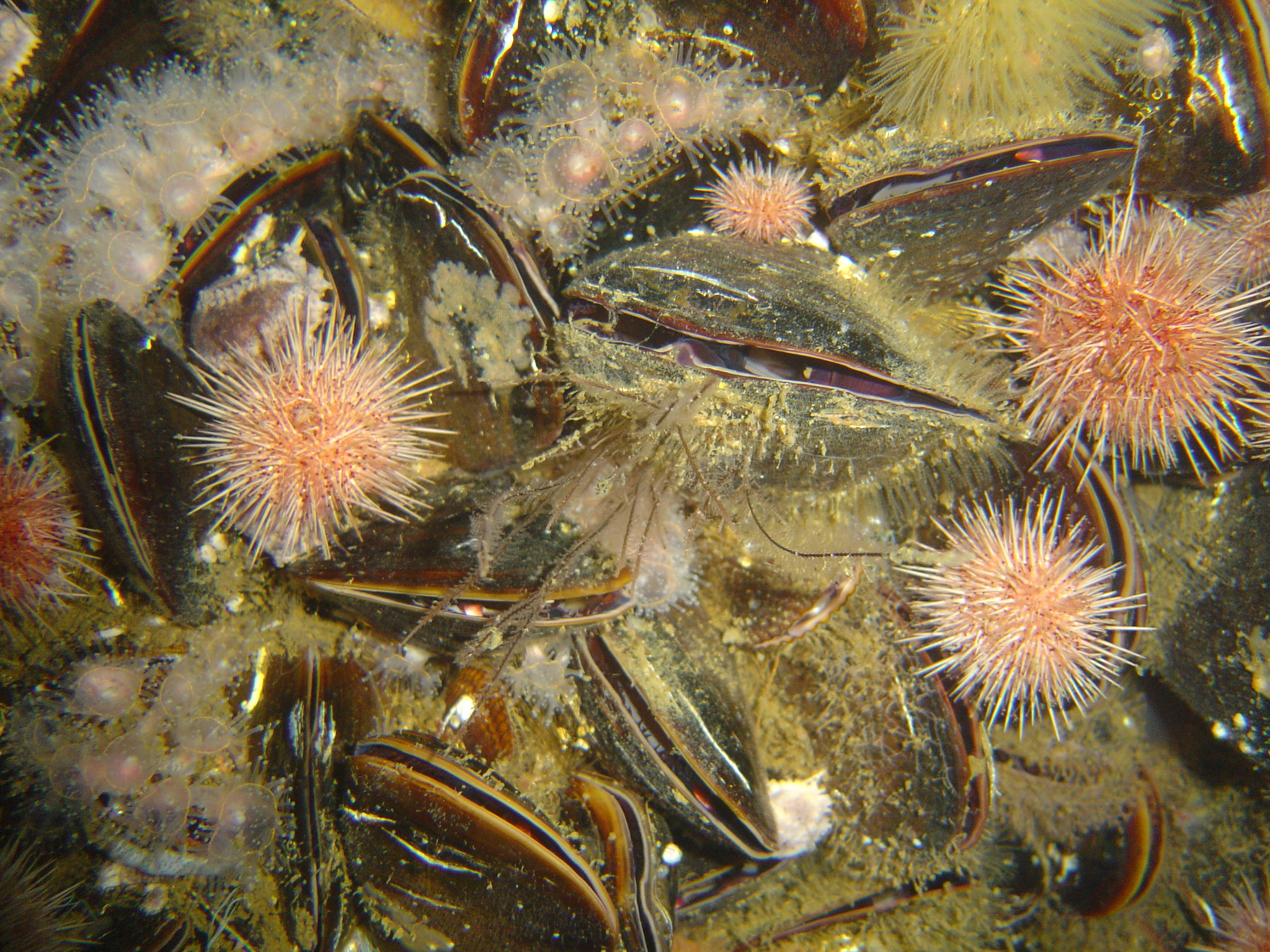
- Choromytilus meridionalis, urchins and strawberry anemones

Scientific classification
- Kingdom: Animalia
- Phylum: Mollusca
- Class: Bivalvia
- Order: Mytilida
- Family: Mytilidae
- Genus: Choromytilus
- Species: C. meridionalis

Binomial name
- Choromytilus meridionalis Krauss, 1848

= Choromytilus meridionalis =

Black mussel

Species of bivalve

Choromytilus meridionalis, the black mussel, is a species of bivalve. It is a marine mollusc in the family Mytilidae. They are part of the Phylum Mollusca which is the second-largest phylum of invertebrates with around 85,000 species. In this article, we will be discussing the taxonomy, morphology, ecology, reproduction, and distribution of Choromytilus meridionalis.

== Taxonomy ==
See: Infobox

== Morphology ==
This animal grows up to 150 mm in length. It is a shiny black mussel that grows clustered in groups on rocks and in sandy areas. It is narrower and blacker than the Mediterranean mussel, Mytilus galloprovincialis, with which it is often confused. The family mytilldae is known for narrow, elliptical, fan-shaped, thin valves which are of the same size, the absence of prominent hinge teeth, and the presence of byssal threads that hang off the hinge area for anchoring on rigid substrates.

== Ecology ==
The black mussel is a filter feeder that eats floating scraps of algae and phytoplankton. It is threatened by the invasion of the fast-growing and hardy Mediterranean mussel, which outcompetes it for space. Particulate organic matter is the major food source of many filter-feeding bivalves including C. meridionalis. Choromytilus meridionalis utilizes bacteria as a nitrogen resource, which is important for its growth and survival in the intertidal zone. The bacterial nitrogen uptake by C. meridionalis was highest when mussels were exposed to high tide and lowest during low tide. The bacterial nitrogen uptake by C. meridionalis is influenced by the availability of other nitrogen sources such as dissolved inorganic nitrogen. This suggests that species have the ability to adjust their nitrogen uptake strategy based on the availability of different nitrogen sources. C. meridionalis may co-exist with the bivalve Aulacomya ater in the field.

== Reproduction ==
In the False Bay area, Choromytilus meridionalis all reproduce at the same time and partake in two breeding seasons. Although the number of eggs and sperm released each year changes, the ratio of eggs to sperm is constant. The sexes are separate and females may be distinguished by the chocolate-brown color of the ovary, while the testis is yellow to white, depending on its state of development. In mature animals, the gonad extends as a thickened lobe in the midline between the gills, posterior to the foot. In C. meridionalis gametogenesis occurs continuously throughout the year. C. meridionalis larvae are present in the water column for most of the time and will readily settle on ropes or buoys suspended in the water; they rarely settle on the rocky substrate.

== Distribution ==
This species is found in lagoonal, coastal, inner shelf, outer shelf, oceanic, brackish, seawater This species is found only around the southern African coast, from central Namibia to Port Elizabeth, in the sublittoral and lower littoral of rocky areas. The population density of C. meridionalis varied significantly among tidal levels, with the highest densities found at the mid-tidal level. The tidal levels also influenced the growth rates of C. meridionalis, in which the individuals found around the mid-tidal levels exhibited the highest growth rates. The most important environmental factors affecting the distribution of the species are temperature and sediment type. They do well in temperatures of 12.5-30 °C. Salinity seems to have little effect on the distribution and abundance of the species.

== Climate change impact ==
Reports of C. meriodionalis in South Africa have been shown to have traces of harmful metals from the ocean. This is due to rising anthropogenic climate change and urban runoff that is threatening the future of mussel farming. Mussel farming is a form of aquaculture that involves raising and harvesting these mollusks in either natural or man-made environments, since mussels are filter feeders, they filter incoming water, when the water becomes polluted the mussels absorb everything in the water which they can retain and this affects humans when they are consumed.
