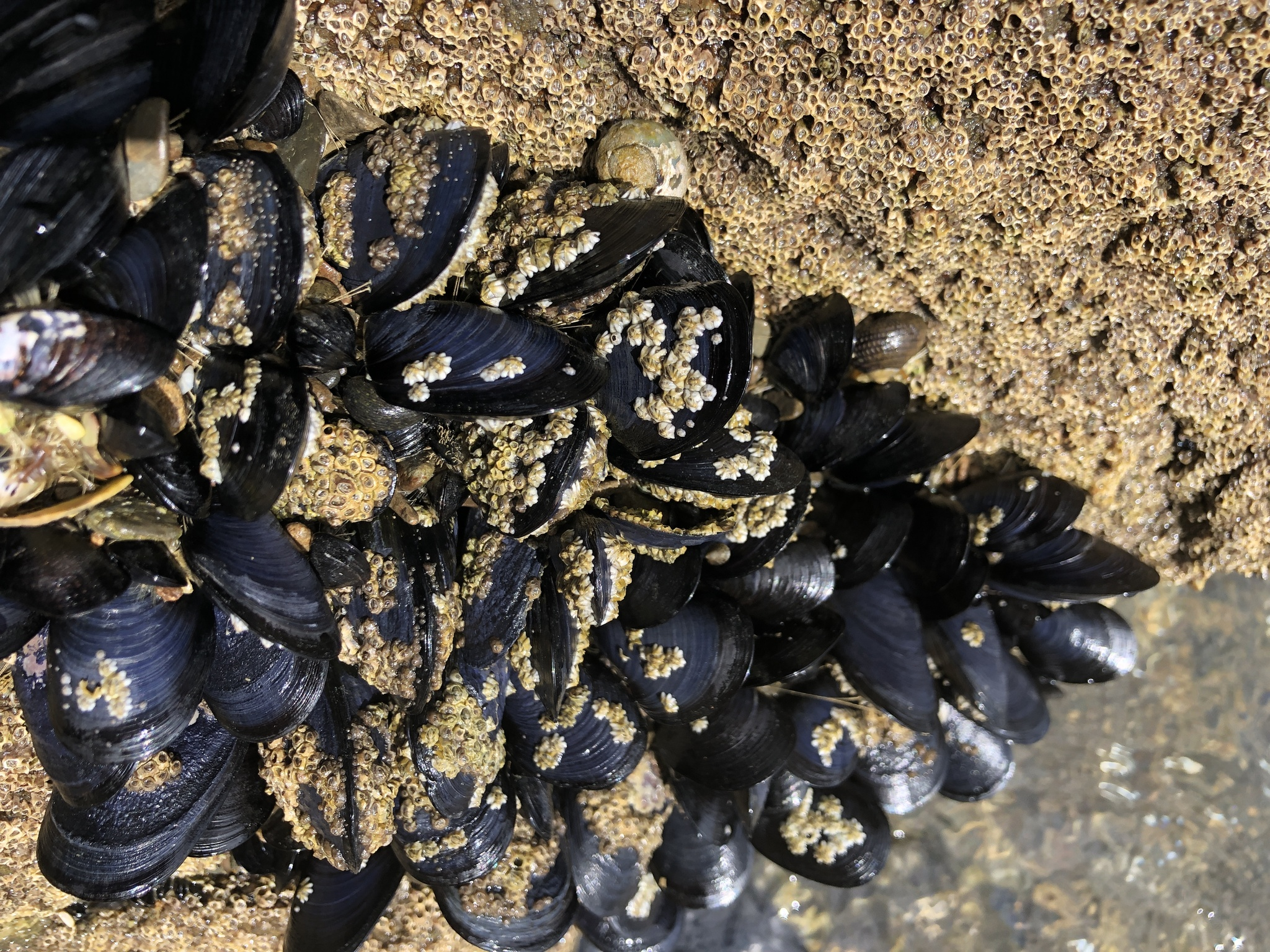
- Mytilus planulatus in Picton, New Zealand

Scientific classification
- Kingdom: Animalia
- Phylum: Mollusca
- Class: Bivalvia
- Order: Mytilida
- Family: Mytilidae
- Genus: Mytilus
- Species: M. planulatus

Binomial name
- Mytilus planulatus Lamarck, 1819

= Mytilus planulatus =

Species of mollusc

Mytilus planulatus is a species of mussel, native to New Zealand and Australia. This species is the only native mussel in Australia. It lives only in marine salt water environments.

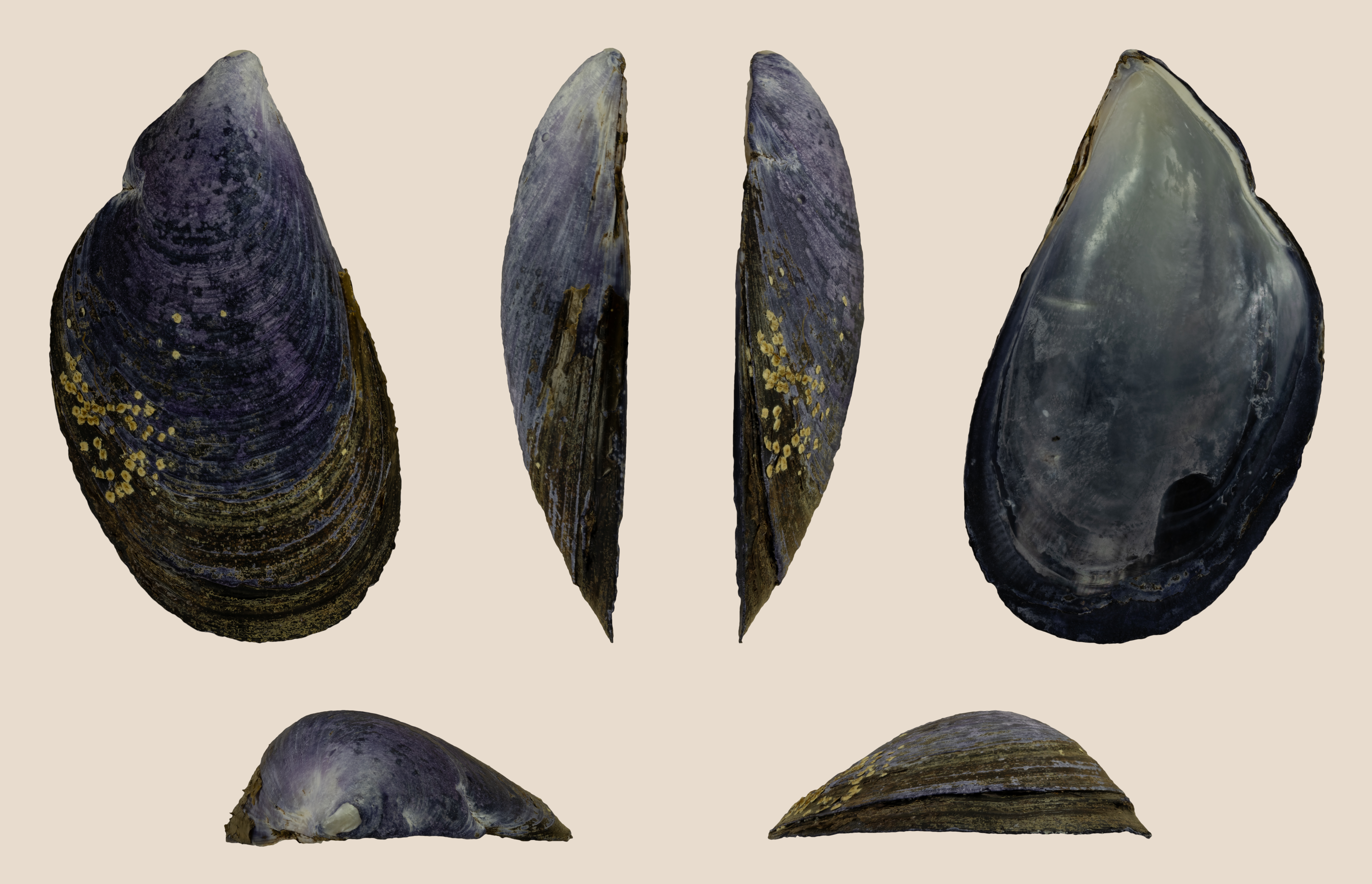
Right valve
