= Condition index in fish =

The condition index in fish is a way to measure the overall health of a fish by comparing its weight with the typical weight of other fish of the same kind and of the same length. The condition index is its actual weight divided by its expected weight, times 100%. A fish of normal weight has a condition index of 100 percent. So if a tarpon, for example, has a condition index of 104 percent, that would mean it is above the normal weight for an average tarpon of that length. If a tarpon has a condition index of 92 percent, that would mean that it is thinner, or below the normal weight of other tarpon that length. The condition index depends on how much a fish is eating compared to the energy it has to spend to live, migrate, reproduce, and do its other activities. The condition index for fish is a simple measurement that can be used to provide important biological information that can then be used to make better management decisions.

== Definition and calculation ==
The condition index in fish is a way to measure the overall health of a fish by comparing its weight with the average weight of other fish of the same length and kind. To do this, a weight-length relationship that is published in a journal or a reliable report is used to make the comparison. Some weight-length relationships are for a group of the same fish from a certain location; others are developed from much data from various locations and represent a more general result. Some studies have enough data to develop separate weight-length relationships for male and female fish of the same species, and/or to develop separate weight-length relationships for different seasons of the year (e.g. spring and fall).

To compute the condition index of an individual fish, it must be weighed and its length measured. Some weight-length relationships use the total length of the fish while others use the fork length. It is important to measure the same kind of length that the reference relationship uses. It is also important to have the weight and length in the same units as the reference relationship.

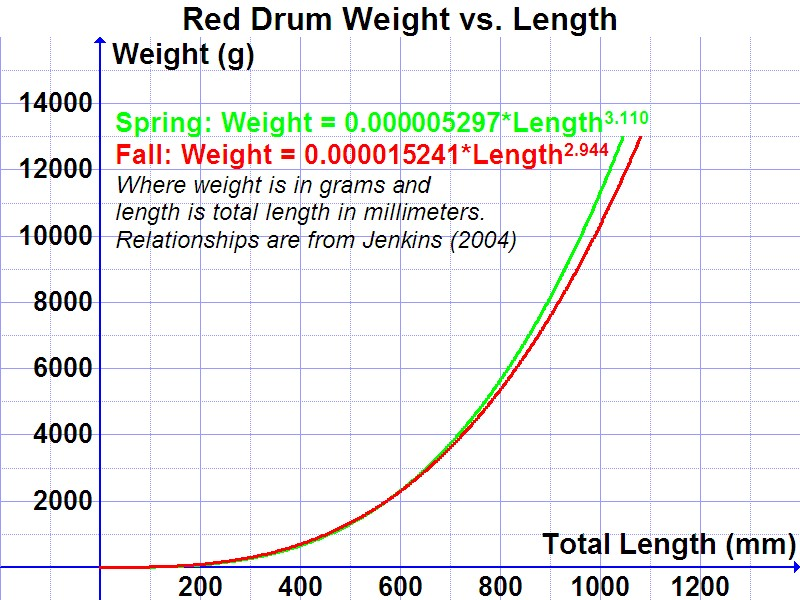
Weight vs. Length for Red Drum (data from Jenkins 2004)

The reference weight-length formula is used to calculate how much the individual fish would be expected to weigh based on its measured length. Then the condition index is the actual weight of the fish divided by its expected weight, times 100%. A condition index greater than 100% means the individual fish weighs more than expected, while a condition index less than 100% means the individual fish weighs less than expected for its length. Since the condition index is used to assess the health of fish, it is important to have a reliable reference weight-length relationship.

For example, a red drum (Sciaenops ocellatus) caught in the spring in waters off of the Gulf Coast of Louisiana, U.S., is expected to have a weight-length relationship of W = 0.000005297L^{3.110}, where W is the weight in grams and L is the total length in millimeters.

Consider one red drum that is 400 millimeters long and has a weight of 616 grams. Based on the reference weight-length relationship, a red drum that is 400 mm long is expected to have a weight of 655 grams. The condition index for that fish is its actual weight divided by its expected weight times one hundred percent, or (616g/655g)x100% = 94%. The fish in this example is below its expected weight, and a scientist might then look for more information to find out if other red drum in the area are also below expected weight. If red drum in the study area tend to be below expected weight, then the scientist might further investigate why this might be.

== Applications ==
Even though it is a simple calculation once a good weight-length relationship is available, the condition index has several important applications. For example, it can be used to compare the health of a specific group of fish to an accepted standard. It can be used to track the health of a group of fish as a function of size (for example, one might see a jump in condition index when a fish is big enough to eat larger prey). Condition index can also be used to compare the relative health of two competing types of fish in the same body of water. Barakat and colleagues used condition index to measure the effectiveness of different feeding programs in aquaculture of juvenile spinefoot rabbitfish.

Condition index in fish can be used to make management decisions such as fishing limits in specific areas. For example, Ratz and Lloret (2002) observed that Atlantic cod living in colder waters, such as Greenland, Labrador and Grand Bank, were in poorer condition than cod living in warmer waters such as the North Sea and Irish Sea. They suggest that the warmer waters might be able to support higher fishing rates than the colder waters.

Some have suggested using condition index in living organisms as a bioindicator of the health of other parts of the environment in which it lives. The condition index is basically the relative fatness of the organism, which represents energy reserves, and Stevenson and Woods (2006) suggested that it can be used as an indication of the quality of the habitat and to guide the expectation of how successful reproduction might be. Jenkins (2004) specifically used fish in the Calcasieu Estuary of the Louisiana Gulf Coast to assess possible negative impacts of environmental contaminants. She used condition index as well as biochemical and microscopic measurements.
