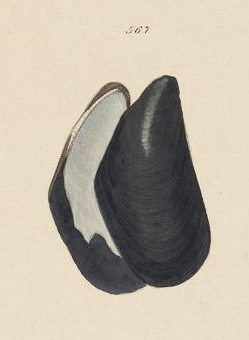

Conservation status
- Secure (NatureServe)

Scientific classification
- Kingdom: Animalia
- Phylum: Mollusca
- Class: Bivalvia
- Order: Mytilida
- Family: Mytilidae
- Genus: Mytilus
- Species: M. trossulus

Binomial name
- Mytilus trossulus Gould, 1850

= Mytilus trossulus =

Species of bivalve

Mytilus trossulus, the Pacific blue mussel, bay mussel or foolish mussel, is a medium-sized edible marine bivalve mollusc in the family Mytilidae.

Mytilus trossulus is one of the three principal, closely related taxa in the Mytilus edulis complex of blue mussels, which collectively are widely distributed on the temperate to subarctic coasts the Northern Hemisphere, and often are dominant inhabitants on hard substrates of the intertidal and nearshore habitats.

== Distribution ==
Mytilus trossulus is the main native intertidal mussel in the Northern Pacific. In North America it is found from California to Alaska, and in Asia from Hokkaido northwards. At its southern limits, it hybridizes with Mytilus galloprovincialis (the Mediterranean mussel), which has been introduced to the Pacific by human activity.

In the North Atlantic, M. trossulus is found on the U.S. coast of Maine and northwards to Canada, as well as in scattered localities on North European coasts. In these regions it often coexists and hybridizes with Mytilus edulis. The entire Baltic Sea is inhabited by a peculiar population of Mytilus trossulus, which shows some genetic introgression from M. edulis and whose mitochondrial DNA has been replaced by M. edulis mtDNA.

In the Arctic, Mytilus trossulus is found in northwest Greenland where they are found scattered in the intertidal zone from 71°N to 77°N
