= Fish for finance =

Brexit negotiations topic

Fish for finance

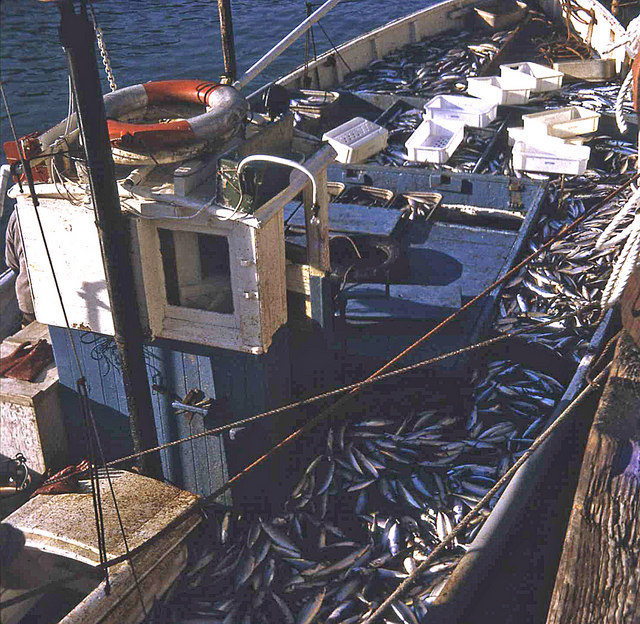
Freshly caught fish awaiting unloading from a British boat

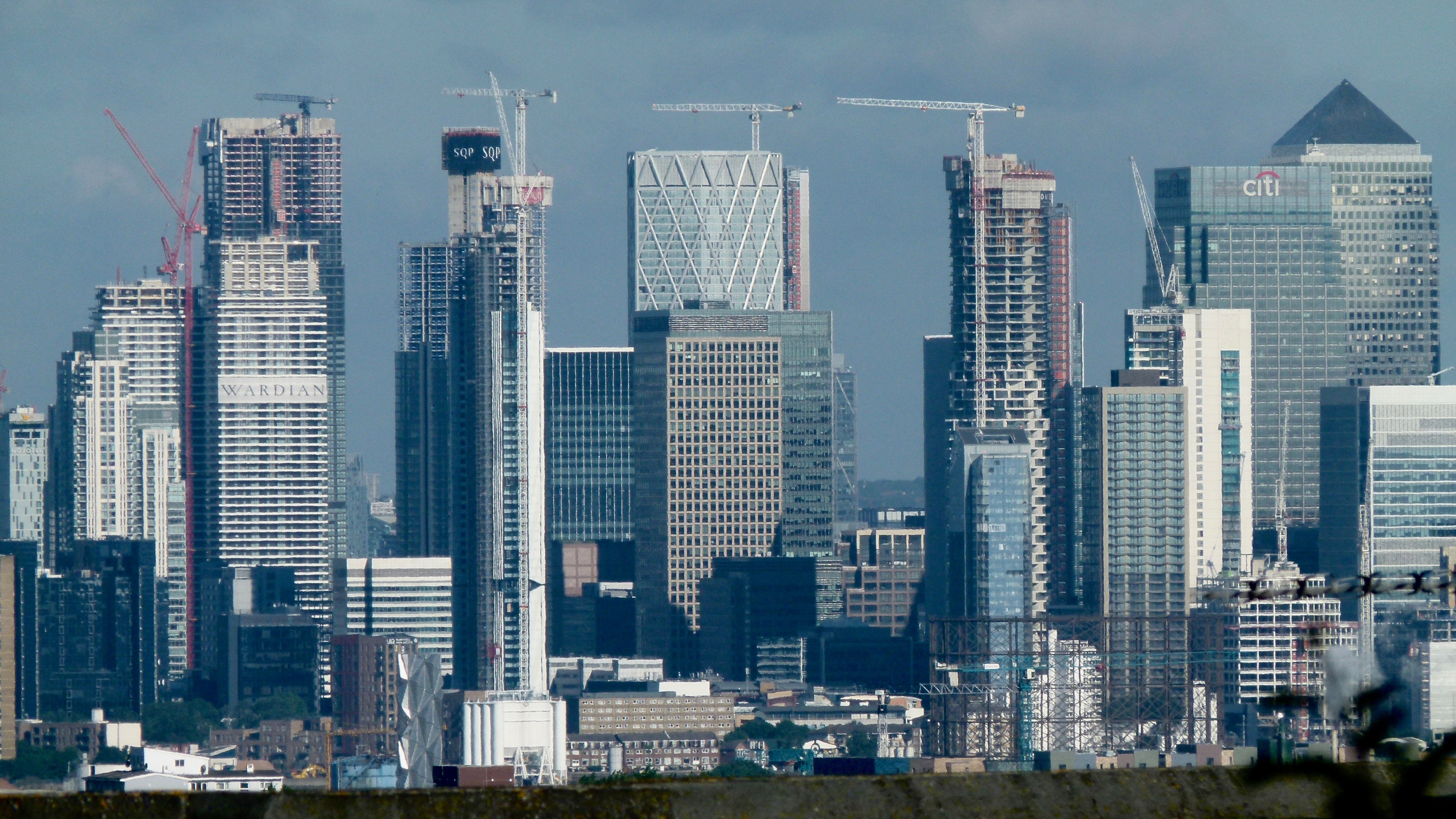
Financial companies' office buildings in Canary Wharf, London

Fish for finance is the popular phrase used to describe the possible trade-off betrween two major UK industries that was considered by both sides during the trade negotiations between the United Kingdom and the European Union (EU) over their future relationship following Brexit in January 2020. The Brexit withdrawal agreement between the two parties called for an agreement on fisheries to be concluded by June 2020, followed by an agreement on financial services at the end of July, deadlines which were both missed. Both were expected to be part of the final EU–UK trade agreement reached by the end of 2020, the end of the Brexit transition period. The final agreement had some broad outlines for a future fishing deal, primarily gradual EU concessions of fishing quota in UK waters, but was largely silent on finance.

British commercial fishermen were among the most ardent supporters of Brexit before and after the 2016 referendum that began the process when a majority of voters opted for the country to leave the EU. Many of them had expressed discontent with the EU's Common Fisheries Policy (CFP), under which the UK has had to share its exclusive economic zone (EEZ) with other member states' fishing fleets; Brexit proponents have argued that British fishermen should be able to catch at least the majority of the fish in that portion of the country's EEZ around the island of Great Britain and off the coast of Northern Ireland. During the UK's membership in the EU, much of the fish that British fishermen have historically caught in the EEZ has been exported to mainland Europe, leading many British fish processors, fish farmers and inshore fishermen (whose catch of primarily shellfish is popular with consumers in France and Spain, but not the UK) to seek a continuation of the pre-2021 frictionless trade situation; conversely a majority of the fish consumed in the UK is caught outside British waters. It was feared that EU fishermen, who had themselves historically fished British waters, planned to block imports of British fish, and even all British imports, if the UK limited their rights to do so. Industry advocates on both sides feared this would lead to potentially lethal violence on sea and land, in addition to the economic consequences of a trade war. The EU's eight western coastal states, whose fleets partake of the catch in British waters, asked that no overall trade deal with the UK be concluded without a fisheries agreement; the UK conversely believed the issue did not have to be settled first.

The British financial sector, which employs more people and accounts for a much greater share of the country's gross domestic product (GDP) than fishing, made clear that it would like at the very least a declaration of stock market equivalence similar to what the EU has extended to the US, Hong Kong, Australia and (in the past) Switzerland. Ideally the City (Note: The British financial sector is metonymically referred to this way due to originally being centred, and still to a great extent based in, the City of London.) wished to maintain the level of access to EU markets it has enjoyed during the UK's membership in the bloc. EU officials and negotiators have said that they would be inclined to continue allowing that level of access only if the UK is likewise willing to allow the same level of access to its fisheries. Unlike the UK's fishermen, financial companies can move to take advantage of more favourable regulatory climates, and many have already begun relocating staff and operations to Dublin, Frankfurt, Paris or Amsterdam, or elsewhere in the EU.

Deadlines set originally by the Withdrawal Agreement were missed, in part due to the disruption caused by the COVID-19 pandemic. By the end of 2020, it did not appear to observers or the parties themselves as if a deal would be reached, and the UK and EU both began to prepare for the worst possible impacts of that transition. On 24 December, a deal was announced with a compromise on fishing quotas which UK fishing industry spokesmen found disappointing. Negotiations continued on a substantial financial services agreement, despite missing the original deadline of 31 March 2020.

== Planned negotiation timetable ==
The Withdrawal Agreement by which the UK left the European Union at the end of January 2020 included a non-binding political declaration, concluded the previous October, setting the terms for post-Brexit relations, with the intent of reaching a comprehensive trade agreement by the end of 2020. The declaration sets forth specific dates prior to that for negotiating agreements on particular economic sectors. Among them are fisheries and financial services.

On fishing, the declaration calls for the two parties to 'use their best endeavours to conclude and ratify their new fisheries agreement by 1 July 2020 in order for it to be in place in time to be used for determining fishing opportunities for the first year after the transition period'. No similar deadline is established for an agreement on financial services. Instead, the two sides committed to assessing each other's regulatory frameworks for stock market equivalence by the end of June.

Before that date, the agreement called for both sides to have a summit conference to assess the progress of the talks. Should the British government have desired an extension of the transition period to allow for longer negotiations, it could have requested one of up to two years no later than 1 July; the EU would have had to agree. These terms are set by the Withdrawal Agreement; to modify them would require a formal modification to that agreement itself.

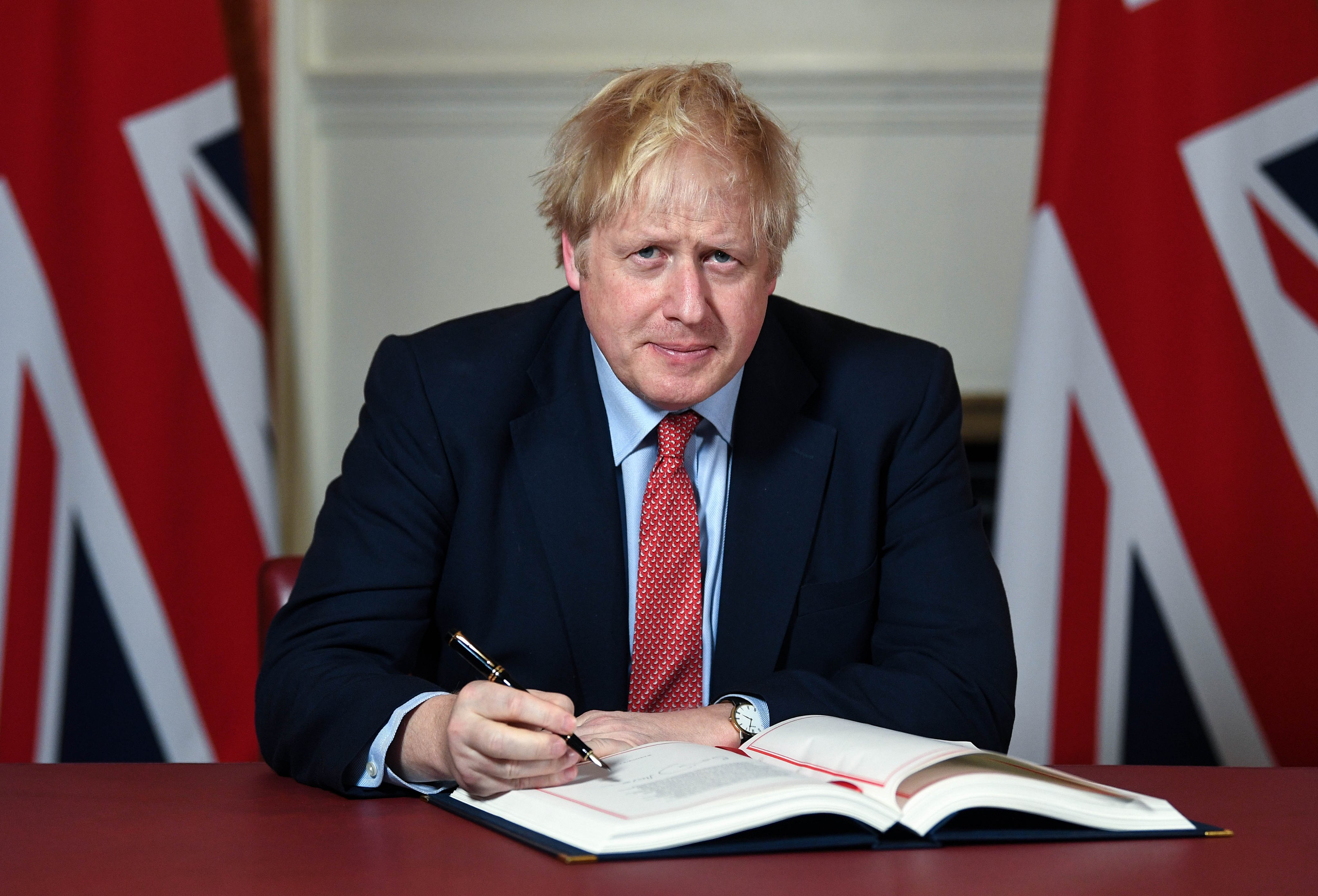
Prime Minister Boris Johnson signing the Withdrawal Agreement

For the government to have requested an extension, it would also have to get permission from Parliament. An amendment to the bill implementing Brexit, barred the government from requesting one. Prime Minister Boris Johnson further told Parliament he would not request one, arguing that for trade talks to produce timely results, there needs to be a clear and early deadline.

None of these deadlines were met; the disruptions resulting from the COVID-19 pandemic, which required several rounds of talks to be held virtually, have been held to blame, but the two sides remain very far apart in on the issues. Negotiations on fisheries continue with little indication of progress. By 30 June, the UK had only completed and returned four of the 28 questionnaires about its securities market regulation sent it by the EU; three weeks later, the government reported that all had been completed and returned. At that same time, the government confirmed it would not be seeking an extension, committing the UK to fully leaving the EU at the end of the year no matter what the circumstances.

== Fishing and the United Kingdom ==
=== History of fishing conflicts and agreements between the UK and other nations ===
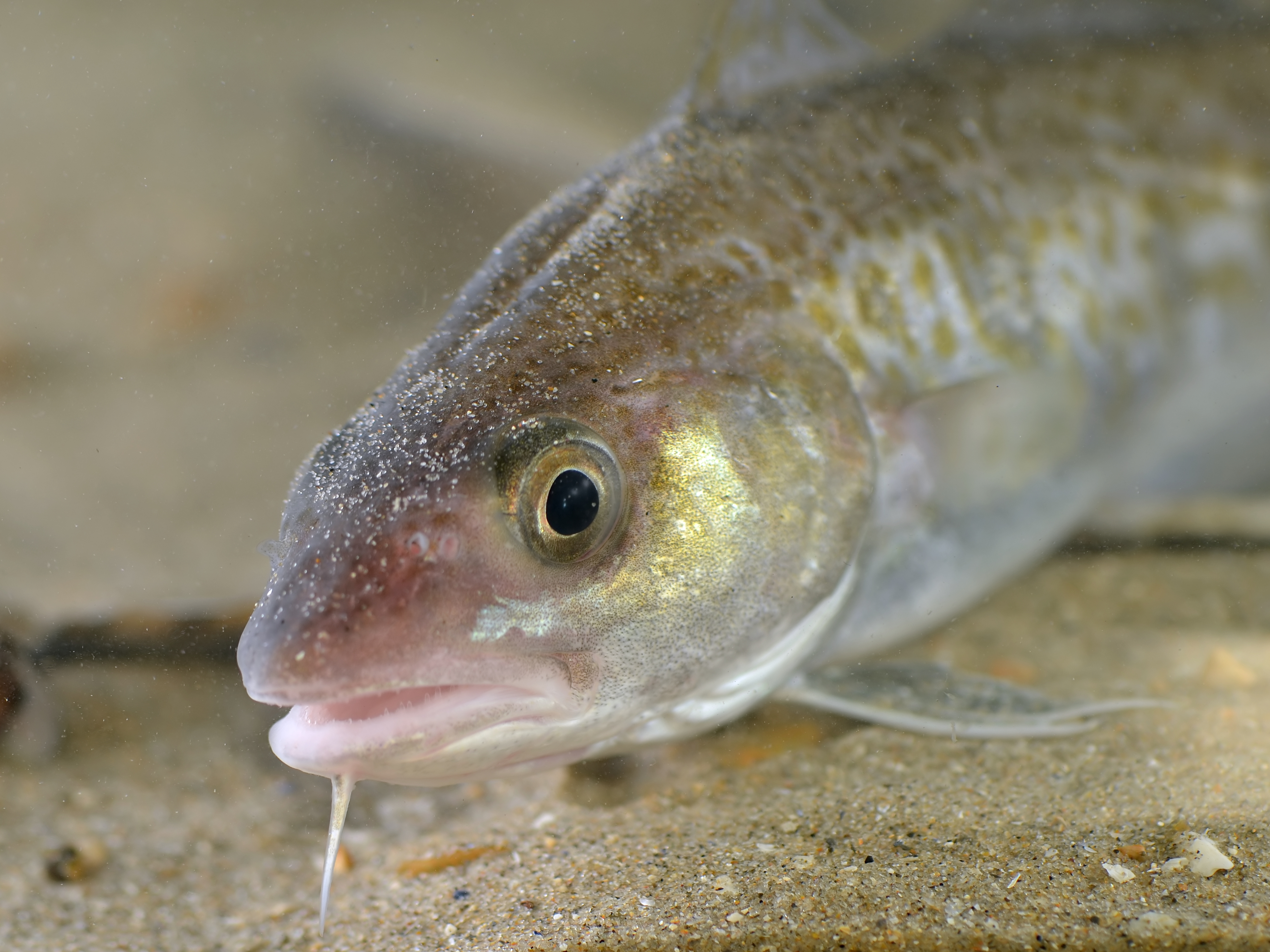
Atlantic cod

Seafood has long been a staple of inhabitants of the British Isles, surrounded by one of the world's richest fisheries. Danish and Norse raiders in the ninth century brought one fish species in particular, the North Sea cod, into the national diet. Other whitefish like halibut, hake and pollock, also became popular.

By the end of the 14th century, fishing boats from the east coast of England, then as now home to most of the English fishing fleet, were sailing to Icelandic waters in search of these catches; their landings grew so abundant as to cause political friction between England and Denmark, who ruled Iceland at the time. The Danish King Eric banned all Icelandic trade with England in 1414 and complained to his English counterpart, Henry V, about the depletion of fishing stocks off the island. Restrictions on British fishing passed by Parliament were generally ignored and unenforced, leading to violence and the Anglo-Hanseatic War (1469–74). Diplomats resolved these disputes through agreements that allowed British ships to fish Icelandic waters with seven-year licences, a provision that was struck from the Treaty of Utrecht when it was presented to the Icelandic Althing for ratification in 1474. This started a centuries-long series of intermittent disputes between the two countries, the most recent of which were the three "Cod Wars" between 1958 and 1976.

Fishermen in Scotland, a country more dependent on their industry than England, bitterly resented the competition from Dutch boats in the country's waters, and when their king James united the Scottish and English crowns in 1609 as James I he reversed what had been the tolerant policies of his Tudor predecessors toward foreign fishing in British coastal waters and began requiring a steep licence fee. Dutch legal scholar Hugo Grotius had at the same time argued, in response to clashes between his country and Portugal, for the mare liberum principle, under which the seas were common property and all nations and people had a right to use it as they chose. England's John Selden responded in 1635 with the mare clausum "closed sea" principle under which a nation could appropriate the seas as easily as it would land.

During the 18th century, British governments complained to France and the Netherlands as well as Denmark about their countries' fishing boats venturing into British waters. Eventually the Dutch agreed to respect a six-mile (9.7 km) limit, going no closer to British shores. After the Napoleonic Wars, French fishermen became much more aggressive around Great Britain, making their presence known along the Scottish coast and in the English Channel; the complaints they generated from British fishermen were reciprocated against them by the French. In 1843 the two countries concluded the first ever international agreement establishing exclusivity zones for their fisheries, of three miles (4.8 km) from their respective shores.

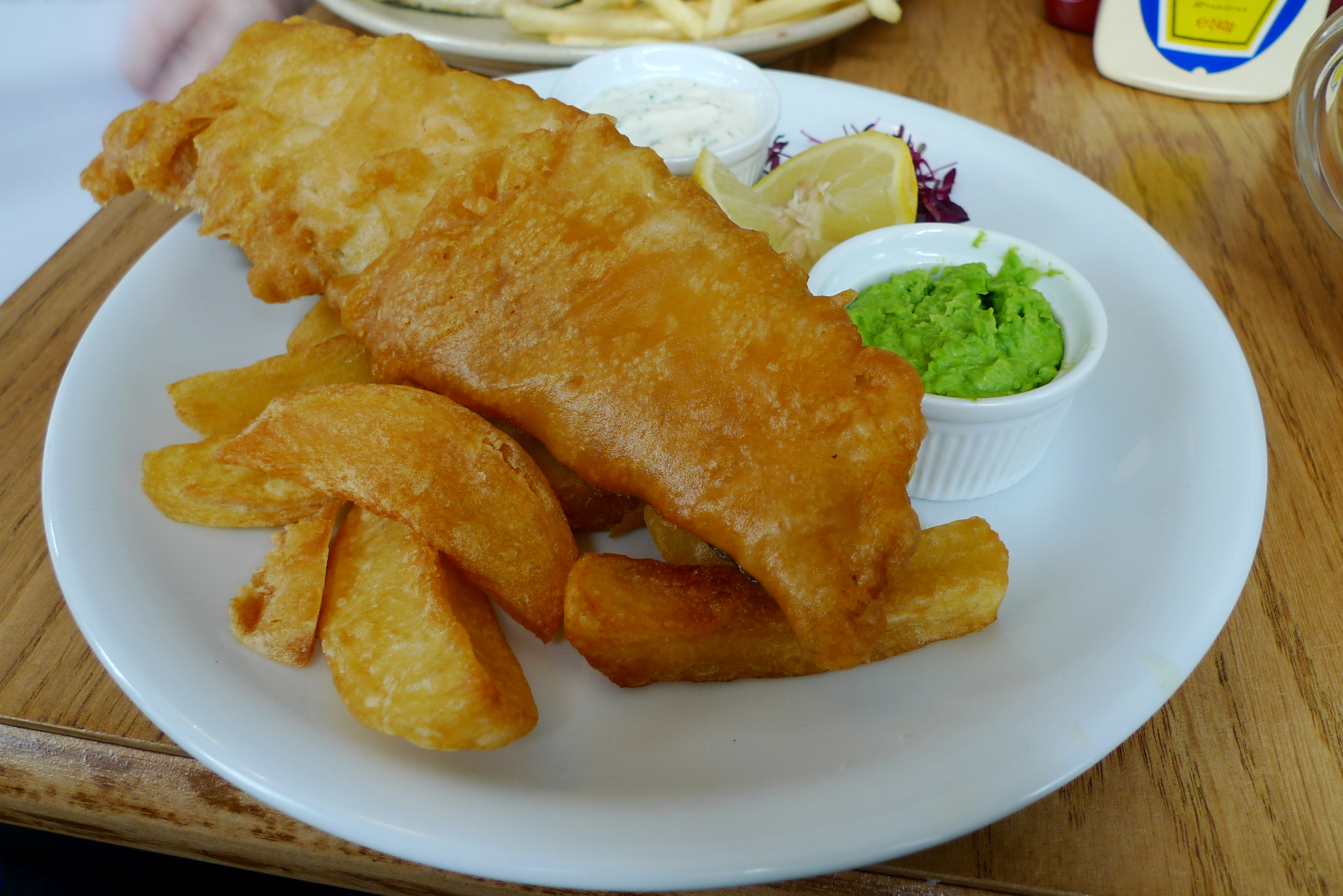
Fish and chips

Domestic demand for seafood in the UK grew rapidly following the Industrial Revolution, as the development of the country's rail network allowed fresh fish to reach a wider market away from the coasts; fish and chips, first served in the 1860s, generally made with either cod or haddock, quickly grew to become a staple of English cuisine and a national symbol. In response, steam-powered trawlers, which could go farther, stay out longer and catch more fish than their sail-driven predecessors, were added to the fishing fleet. This development has been considered the beginning of the decline of the British fishing industry, since even though its fish landings continued to increase until the late 1930s, when they were more than five times those of the late 2010s, the fleet's productivity, measured in fish landings per unit of fishing power (LPUP), began a steady decline that continues.

In the early 20th century, the return of modern British fishing boats to inshore waters off the northern coast of Norway after almost three centuries when they had respected royal decrees barring them from those areas, provoked a local backlash, and the newly independent Norwegian government began specifying conditions under which foreign boats could fish the country's waters north of the Arctic Circle. The seizure of a British trawler for violating those laws started negotiations between the two governments that World War I interrupted; afterwards the incidents continued, resulting in a 1935 Norwegian royal decree claiming the waters within 4 nautical miles (7.4 km; 4.6 mi) of its shoreline as exclusively Norwegian, but enforcing it only irregularly pending an agreement with the UK. Thirteen years later, no agreement had been reached and after Norway began strictly enforcing its limit, the UK brought suit at the International Court of Justice, arguing that Norway's limits did not follow its coastline in that area as strictly as international law required. In 1951 the court found in Norway's favour.

British trawlers began again heavily fishing the waters near Iceland, leading to the confrontations known as the "Cod Wars" of 1958–61, 1972–73 and 1975–76. A threat of actual violence was present, with fishing boats escorted to the water by the Royal Navy and the Icelandic Coast Guard similarly attempting to chase them away and using long hawsers to cut nets from the British boats; actions that resulted in one serious injury on the British side and the death of an Icelandic engineer. Ships from both sides suffered damage from ramming attacks.

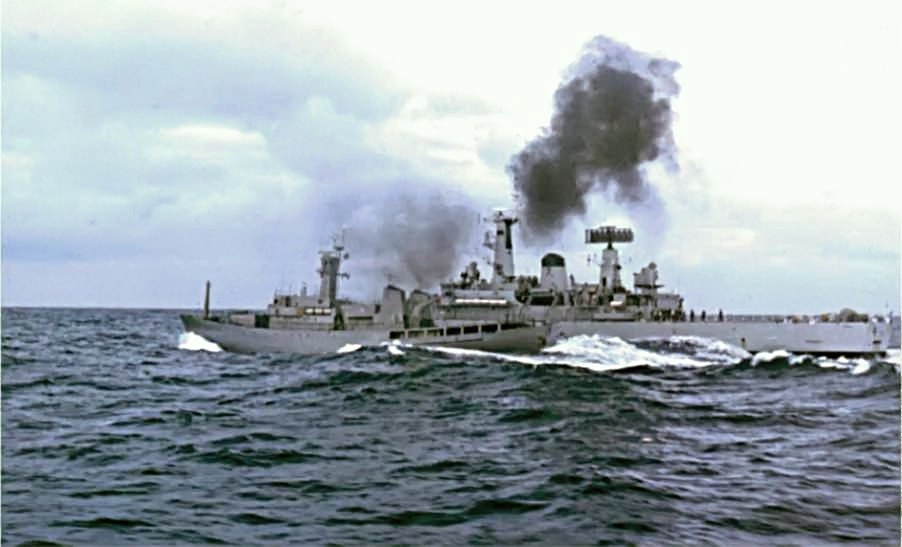
British and Icelandic ships confront each other during the last "Cod War" (1975–76)

A British ban on the import of all Icelandic fish backfired when the Soviet Union bought the catch instead. As this was during the Cold War, this led to fears that Iceland might carry out its threats to leave the North Atlantic Treaty Organization (NATO), and ultimately the other nations of the military alliance brokered a resolution where the UK had to accept Iceland's establishment of a 12-nautical-mile (22 km) exclusive zone around its shores where only its own ships could fish and a 200-nautical-mile (370 km) exclusive economic zone (EEZ) where other nations' fishing fleets needed Iceland's permission.

The effective loss of the Icelandic fishery had drastic effects on the British fishing industry, already dealing with the ongoing decline in both LPUP and landings. In the home ports of many of the ships that had been fishing off Iceland, an estimated 1,500 people lost jobs either on boats or in fish processing plants; workers in shore-based support industries, and those other sectors that relied on local economies built around fishing, were also unemployed in significant numbers. Some of those ports, such as Fleetwood on the Lancashire coast, and Grimsby, at the mouth of the Humber, have never recovered. (Note: Grimsby remains the leading English fishing port in terms of capacity, with 16,561 gross tons of its 123 predominantly large (10 m or more) vessels, and is second only to Newlyn in total engine power among English ports.)

==== EU membership era ====
Since the 1976 ending of the Cod Wars had forced the UK to abandon the "open seas" international fisheries policy it had previously espoused, Parliament passed the Fishery Limits Act 1976, declaring a similar zone around its own shores, (Note: In practice, the UK's EEZ can only reach its full 200-mile limit off the West Coast of Scotland; everywhere else, it is shorter due to the proximity of neighbouring states such as France with which the UK has agreed on a boundary.) a practice later codified into the United Nations Convention on the Law of the Sea (UNCLOS). It was not able to enforce them for long against European Communities member countries, as the UK had joined it too, including the EU's predecessor, the European Common Market. As a condition of its membership, the UK had to accede to the Common Fisheries Policy (CFP), for which the basics had just largely been negotiated, (Note: British fishermen and politicians supportive of their interests have long believed that timing was not coincidental, as not only the UK but Ireland and Denmark, both of which also have rich fisheries, were in the process of accession as well. Norway, also considering membership at the time, aborted its bid earlier in the process due to concerns over the CFP.) and share those exclusive waters (Note: the UK did not actually declare an EEZ of its own until 2013.) with other member states, (Note: An internal policy memorandum of Edward Heath's government at that time described fishing, at least in Scotland, as "expendable ... in light of Britain's wider European interests"; it was not made public until 2003.) including France and the Netherlands, as well as Norway, a non-member state that jointly manages its fishery with the EU, and the Faroe Islands, an autonomous Danish archipelago northwest of the UK. (Note: Voters in Greenland, then under more direct Danish administration, had opposed joining the Common Market in Denmark's 1972 membership referendum. Seven years later, newly under home rule, the winning party in Greenland's first election promised a new referendum on EEC membership; three years later, 53 per cent of Greenland's voters chose to leave the EEC. The CFP was a major point of opposition; the Greenland Treaty, which put that withdrawal into effect in 1985, allows the EU fishing rights in Greenland's waters.) Sir Con O'Neill, who led the UK's negotiating team, said fishing was the most difficult issue to resolve as part of the UK's accession, calling it "economic peanuts but political dynamite". The government at different times feared that it would cost it its parliamentary majority in favour of accession, as had happened in Norway.

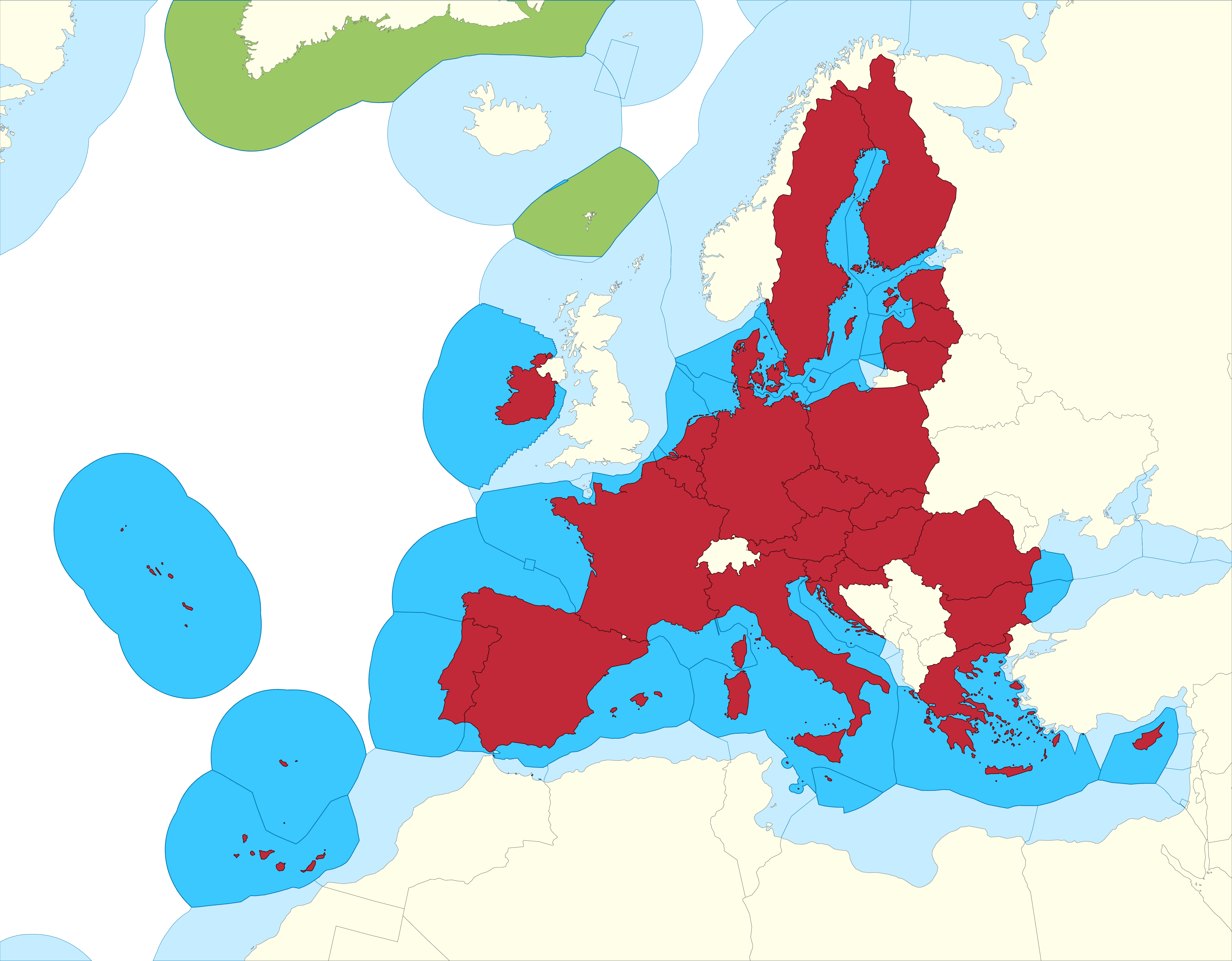
Combined EU EEZs during UK membership era; Key: Red: EU member states (excluding UK) Pale Blue: Exclusive Economic Zones (Iceland, Norway, Russia, UK) Darker Blue: EU member states Exclusive Economic Zones Green: EU member states overseas territories Exclusive Economic Zones

Prime Minister Margaret Thatcher's government successfully lobbied for the CFP to include an increase in the Total Allowable Catch (TAC) for British vessels for some species, such as haddock, to make up for their lost Icelandic fishing grounds. In the years before 1983, when the CFP came into full effect, many British fishermen believed that fleets from the seven other coastal states increased their catches in British waters since the quotas for the policy, meant to conserve stocks and curb the ongoing overfishing, were based on historical data. After the CFP, all member states' EEZs were shared. British boats could fish off the shores of any of the other seven coastal member states, and their boats could fish in British waters, as desired. The British fishing industry continued to decline, exacerbated by the use of newer technology that required less labour and restored profit margins.

While the CFP established national quotas, it left it to the member states to decide how to allocate them among its own fishing boats. The UK, unlike the others, divided them into "fixed quota allocations" (FQAs) and allowed its fishermen to trade them freely, buying and selling shares of its TAC for various species with each other and even foreigners. This led to the "quota hoppers" controversy in the mid-'80s when Spanish fishermen set up British companies to buy British ships and their corresponding quota allegations, then landed fish caught in British waters, counting against the British quota, in Galicia for processing and ultimate sale in Spain, which had recently joined what had by then been renamed the European Economic Community. (Note: This practice had started prior to Spain's accession, as a way for Spanish boats to continue fishing in British waters, otherwise closed to them once the UK had proclaimed its own EEZ. They mainly caught anglerfish, hake and megrim, species more prized at home than in the UK, which they would ship to Spain via roads after unloading at ports in the West Country, and selling the bycatch, which often consisted of species more desirable in the British market, at those local ports. While the practice was generally not resisted by British fishermen since the increased catch helped boost the country's overall quota allowances under annual revisions to the CFP, the sale of bycatch angered local fishermen since it depressed the price of those species, and the government responded with the British Fishing Boats Act 1983, prohibiting the Spanish-owned British-flagged boats from landing their catch at British ports. The Spaniards responded by simply taking their catch back to Galicia and landing it there, a solution which worked until Spain's accession.) Thatcher's government responded by passing legislation effectively requiring that all British fishing boats be owned by British citizens or companies that were 75 per cent British-owned, and controlled or supervised from the UK. The Spanish companies challenged this in court as a violation of EU law and treaties, resulting in a seminal series of decisions that established the primacy of EU law over national law where the two were in conflict.

The CFP did not put an end to confrontations at sea between the UK and other nations, both in and out of the EU. French fishermen clashed with the Royal Navy in 1993 over their rights in the waters near the Channel Islands. In 2010 the 'Mackerel War' erupted after Iceland and the Faroes changed their minds about previously agreed quotas of that fish in their waters, where stocks had been moving to in response to climate change, and vastly increased that portion they allowed themselves from their EEZs; in response, Scottish trawlers blocked a Faroese ship from landing 1,100 tonnes (1,100 long tons; 1,200 short tons) of mackerel to a Peterhead processing plant. (Note: The incident played a role in Iceland's withdrawal of its EU membership application the following year.) Two years afterward, French boats started the 'Scallop War', throwing rocks at British dredgers taking those shellfish from beds in the English Channel the French claimed were within 12 nautical miles (22 km) (Note: All further references to miles in this article are to nautical miles (one of which is 1.15 land miles, or 1.85 km)) of their coast and thus not for the British to take.

Some fishermen went to elaborate lengths to evade quota enforcement. In the late 2000s Scottish authorities uncovered a 'black landings' scheme in which over two dozen boat captains and three large processing plants had conspired to process and sell £63 million worth of mackerel and herring caught in violation of quota. At one Peterhead plant, they built an elaborate system of underground pipelines and valves, including scales and computers known only to those involved, to conceal the true origin of 170,000 tonnes (170,000 long tons; 190,000 short tons) of fish over quota. Most pleaded guilty at trial and were fined.

With the passage of the Marine and Coastal Access Act 2009, the UK finally established its own EEZ, using the same boundaries created for fishing in 1976, replacing the definitions of its territorial waters it had used in different contexts, such as fishing, mineral rights, and pollution control. Its boundaries were formalised with a 2013 Order in Council deposited with the United Nations the following year.

==== Brexit ====
Results of the 2016 Brexit referendum by UK Parliamentary constituency, with blue indicating a majority for Leave

By June 2016, when British voters chose to leave the EU, the CFP limited British fishermen to 36 per cent of the total catch from their home country's waters, which amounted to a quarter of the total EU catch. Cod stocks had rebounded to sustainability and the British fleet's net profit margin had become the highest in the EU at 35 per cent, and second only to Spain's in terms of capacity by gross tonnage. British fishermen still strongly supported Brexit due to the restrictions of the CFP, which many identified as the reason for the industry's decline; the overall size, capacity and power of the British fishing fleet had declined by about 30 per cent since 1996. A poll taken two weeks before the referendum found 92 per cent of fishermen planned to vote Leave, with many of those who did believing that departure from the EU would benefit their industry.

Brexit proponents used the plight of the UK's fishermen as a large part of its campaign for Leave, taking advantage of their sentimental and symbolic importance to the country. "Here the referendum was lost, in the romance of the sea, the rugged cliffs and coasts of our island story among old salt spirits of a seafaring nation", Polly Toynbee observed in The Guardian after a visit to Hastings. "Economics says fishing is of nugatory value, but politics says fishing is deep-dyed in national identity, down to the last fish and chip shop."

The fishermen themselves reiterated their longstanding complaint that their governments had regularly sacrificed their interests from the country's EU accession onward. (Note: In 2020 Financial Times reporter Frederick Studemann recalled having gone to Fraserburgh and Peterhead a decade earlier to get local reaction to a particularly contentious annual CFP negotiation. "It's safe to say that feelings towards Brussels were as cold as the North Sea waters", he wrote.) They pointed to perceived inequities such as fishing fleets from other EU countries being allotted 60 per cent by weight, (Note: By total value, however, 60 per cent of the landed catch of the total catch from the UK's EEZ is by British boats) and specifically imbalances such as France being allowed 84 per cent of Channel cod while the UK was limited to 9 per cent.

A 2017 study of EU fishing data by the NAFC Marine Centre of the University of the Highlands and Islands, done at the request of the Shetland Fishermen's Association, found that the rest of the EU takes more fish from British waters under the CFP than the UK does from other EU countries' EEZs—boats from the rest of the EU take six times more fish and shellfish by value, and 10 times more by weight, than British boats do, whereas British boats only take 12 per cent of the total EU catch from outside the UK. (Note: The study broke the numbers down by species, and found that plaice was the only fish that British fishermen took more of from other EU countries than EU fishermen took from British waters; EU fishermen took slightly more plaice in British waters than British boats did, in addition to two-thirds of the total plaice taken in EU waters. British fishermen also found two-thirds of the blue whiting they landed in EU waters; their 38,000-tonne (37,000-long-ton) total catch of the species was dwarfed by the 116,400 tonnes (114,600 long tons; 128,300 short tons) caught by EU boats in UK waters. Brown crab was likewise the only shellfish the British fleet took in greater numbers from the EU than the converse, with 3,300 tonnes (3,200 long tons; 3,600 short tons) supplementing the 30,400 tonnes (29,900 long tons; 33,500 short tons) taken by British boats from British waters.) Another NAFC study the following year found that Iceland and Norway, outside the CFP and EU, landed 95 and 84 per cent of the catches from their EEZs.

When the vote was held, the results from the fishing communities along the south and east coasts of England, who blamed the CFP for their industry's decline, came in strongly for Leave. In Scotland, the Parliamentary constituency of Banff and Buchan, where Peterhead and Fraserburgh, two of the largest fishing ports in the UK (and at the time, the EU), are located, was the only constituency to support leaving the EU, by a margin of 54 per cent, a higher margin than the 52 per cent overall majority and much higher than the 38 per cent support average support for Leave across Scotland.

A few months after the vote, Bertie Armstrong, head of the Scottish Fishermen's Federation (SFF), said the UK should not begin renegotiating neighbour states' fishing rights in British waters until after it had completed the process of leaving the EU. "In our strong opinion, you do not in the Brexit process organise access for all those who want it—there has been 40 years of distortion with that—you organise it afterwards", he told the House of Lords. "Allow them to have the fish, of course, but access is a matter of negotiation after Brexit."

=== 21st-century British fishing industry ===
After nearly half a century of membership in the EU and its predecessor organisations, the relationship between British fishermen and their colleagues and consumers in those states remaining members of the EU is closely intertwined. Most of what British fishermen catch in their waters, particularly shellfish, which is not controlled by a CFP quota, is sold on the continent. Similarly, most fish sold and consumed in the UK has been caught elsewhere. The UK runs a trade surplus in fish, exporting 80 per cent of what it catches—40 per cent of the total catch in British waters by weight but 60 per cent by value—and importing 70 per cent of what it eats.

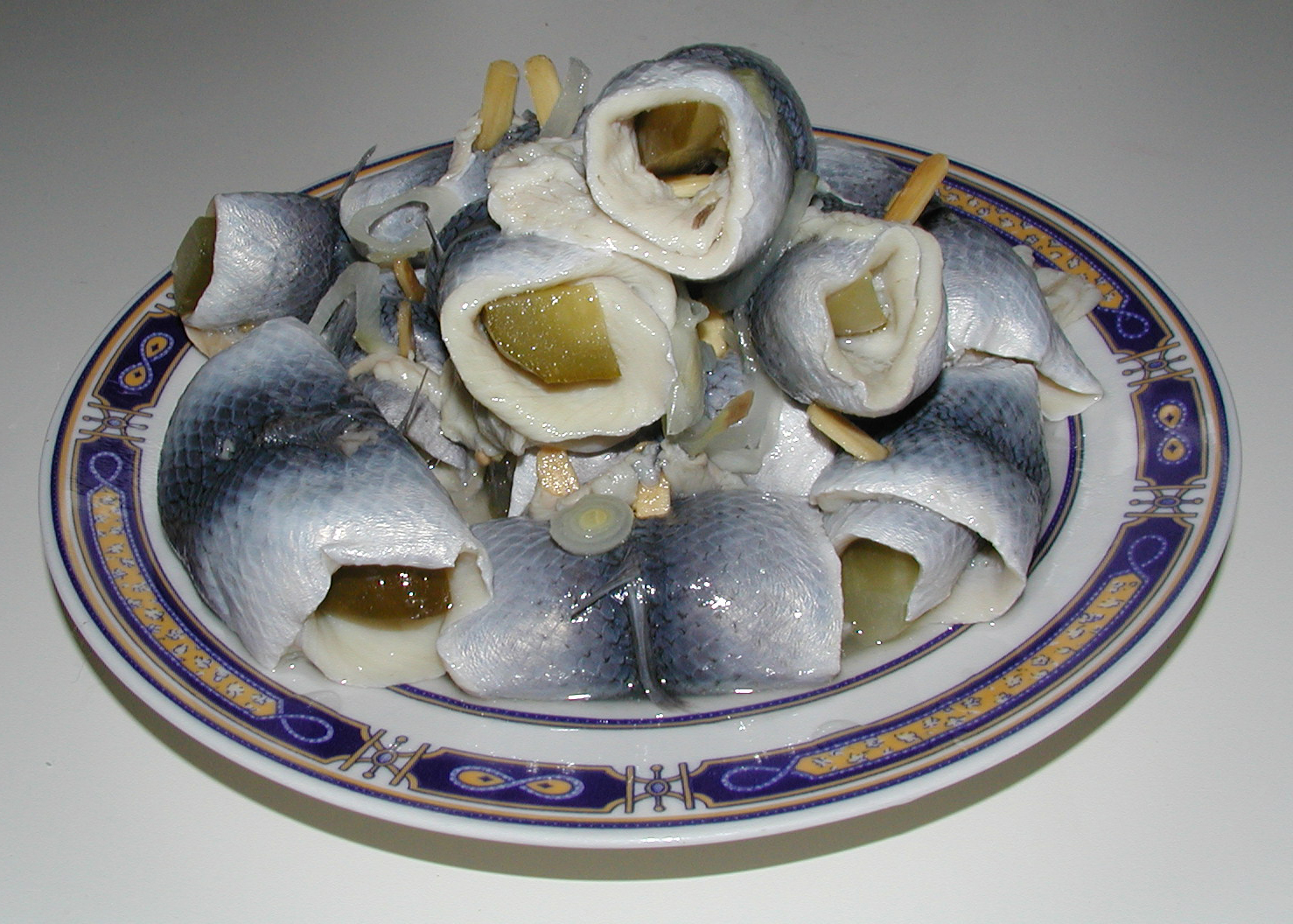
Rollmops, a popular dish on the continent increasingly made with herring caught in British waters by EU boats

This is a result of differences in national tastes and changing fish stocks. To meet demand for cod, the most popular fish to eat with chips, the UK imports 83 per cent of that fish it eats, from international waters off Scandinavia, usually the Barents Sea, plied mostly by Icelandic, Norwegian and Russian vessels. In turn, the herring abundant in British waters is taken mostly by fishermen from other EU countries (Note: By both weight and value, herring is the largest share of the catch from British waters of any species, at 262,400 tonnes (258,300 long tons; 289,200 short tons) (almost a third of the total catch from UK waters) and £160.3 million (a fifth of the total). North Sea herring is the third most popular fish in Europe, and 88 per cent comes from British waters. Danish and Dutch fishermen have the largest shares of the total quota at 17.5 and 17 per cent, respectively. The bulk of the EU fleet's herring catch is, however, taken from non-EU waters in the Northeast Atlantic.) and exported to Germany where it is the third most popular fish, much of it used to make Rollmops, a comfort food similar to fish and chips popular as a hangover cure, since there is less demand for herring in the UK than there was before the species was overfished in the 1970s; kippers have been a less common breakfast since then. (Note: The UK's increasing reliance on fish caught outside its waters has been driven in part by changing tastes. British consumers have become less eager to eat fish generally, and more conservative in their choices, with cod and four other species making up the bulk of fish eaten in the country.) Two-thirds of the UK's shellfish catch, at £430 million a quarter of all British fish exports by value, ends up in France and Spain; diners in the former country are also partial to saithe, a species largely passed up in the UK. (Note: The EU fleet takes 260 times as much saithe from British waters as British ships take from EU waters, the greatest disparity of any species.) British whelks also feed a thriving market in East Asia.

Subsectors of the British fishing industry vary in the benefit, or lack thereof, they derive from trade with the EU and the CFP. Deep-sea fishermen have been the most vocal supporters of Brexit, blaming EU restrictions for the decline of their industry in the UK and competition from other countries (and Norway) that they see as unfair. Inshore fishermen, whose take of primarily shellfish is exempt from quota and who largely work in coastal waters that have always been exclusively British, regulated not by the EU but by the UK's own regional Inshore Fisheries and Conservation Authorities, were more ambivalent, believing that Brexit will primarily benefit the deep-sea fleet and concerned about the effects a trade war or the resumption of trade barriers could have on their markets should EU countries retaliate for any restrictions the UK might impose if a deal cannot be reached.

British fish processors, a £4.2-billion industry, and fish farmers, many of whom also depend heavily on Continental markets, also hoped for a seamless transition to post-Brexit trade. The EU's free movement of labour policy has also benefited landlords in communities with processing plants where the fishermen themselves strongly supported leave; many workers from elsewhere in the EU, particularly Latvia, have come to work in the plants and rented local housing. Seafood restaurants in the UK, too, have also benefited from EU staff, since workers from those countries are more likely to consider working in the front end of restaurants as waitstaff and maître d's as a career rather than a way station to one.

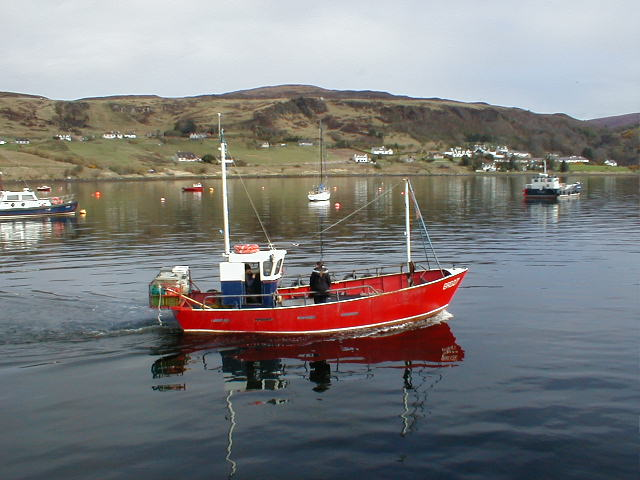
A small fishing boat heading out to sea from Uig Bay in western Scotland's Outer Hebrides

Disparities exist within the British fishing industry as well. In 2004, a report by the Royal Society of Edinburgh found that Scotland accounted for 62 per cent of the UK's landings by value, and half its fish processing industry, despite being home to only 8.6 per cent of the country's people; by 2019 the Scottish fishing industry was still described as being 53 per cent of the total UK industry. Much of that Scottish catch, more than half of which is pelagic species, comes in turn from just 27 trawlers owned by several large companies based in the country's North East and Shetland that primarily harvest pelagic fish. These companies themselves are owned by five families on the Sunday Times Rich List, which between them control outright or in part nearly half of Scotland's FQAs, according to a 2018 Greenpeace report. (Note: Greenpeace also noted that 13 of the 20 largest owners of Scotland's FQAs had been convicted in the black landings scandal.)

Three-quarters of the boats in the Scottish fleet work entirely in inshore waters, many off the country's west coast, catching primarily the langoustine popular with French, Spanish and Portuguese consumers. This large fleet's shellfish catch is conversely overall the smallest portion of the Scottish annual catch. In England it makes up more than a majority, in Wales almost the entire catch, and in Northern Ireland the largest portion, though not a majority, of the catch as measured in tonnes.

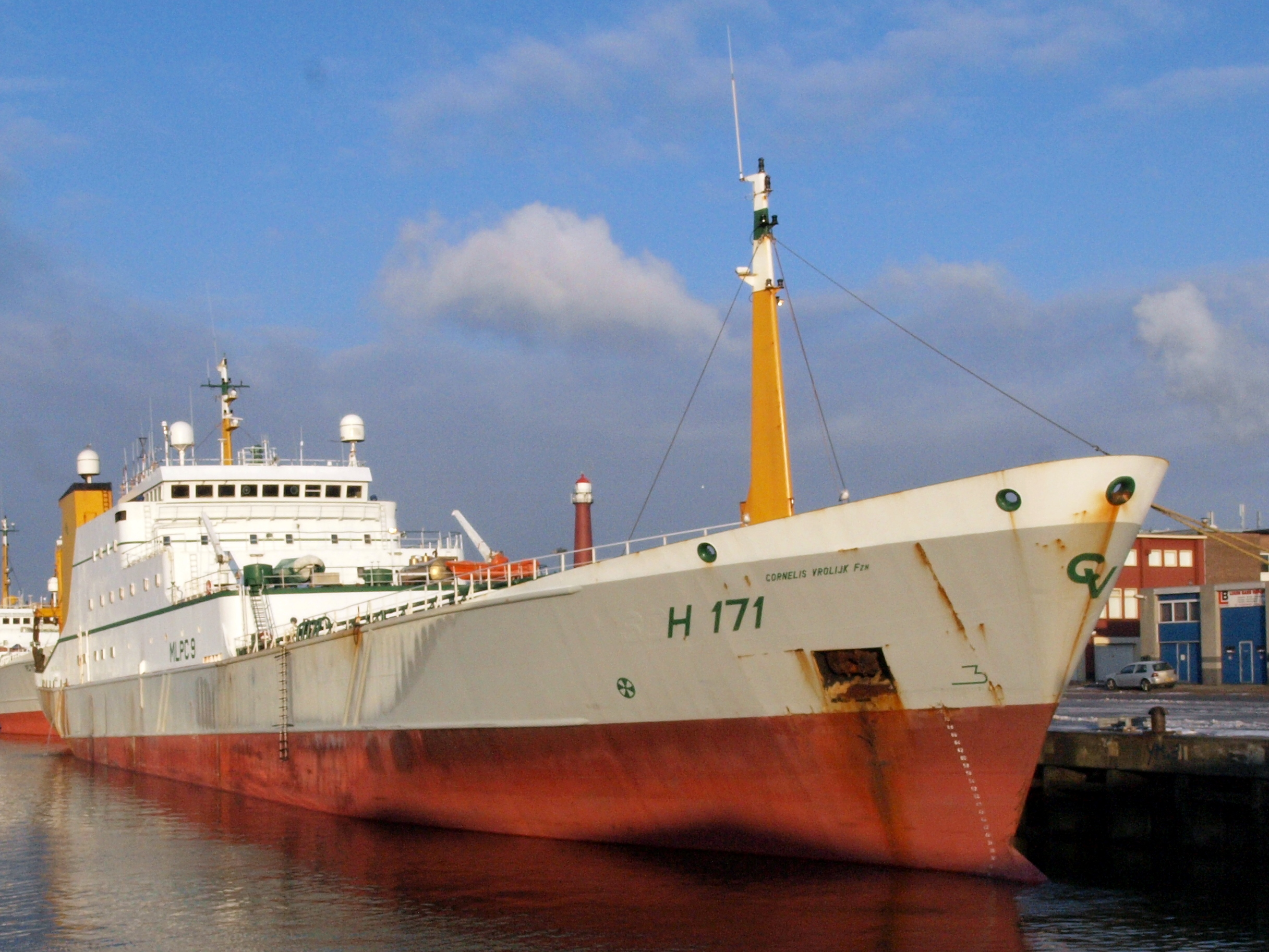
The Cornelis Vrolijk, docked in Amsterdam in 2010

Greenpeace also found disproportionate concentrations of quota ownership among the English fishing fleet, as well, with foreign-owned (mostly Dutch, Icelandic or Spanish) but British-flagged vessels also holding almost half the quota. One, the Dutch 'supertrawler' Cornelis Vrolijk, registered to Caterham, owns 23 per cent of the British TAC and 94 per cent of the UK's herring quota. A further 30 per cent is also owned by three Rich List families, whom Greenpeace called the industry's 'codfathers'. As in Scotland, the small boats (less than 10 metres (33 ft) long) that fish inshore waters exclusively make up the bulk of the fleet (77 per cent) but hold less than 3 per cent of the quotas for fish species subject to quotas under the CFP. (Note: Owners of those boats have complained that a recent plan by the Marine Management Organisation, the main British fisheries regulator, to require that all boats use its Catch app to weigh their daily catch or face criminal prosecution, threatens to not only offset any economic gains they may see from Brexit but actually put them in a worse position.)

Unlike England, Scotland's share of the quota is mostly Scottish-owned, due to the prevalence of family-owned businesses in that sector there. Most of Wales' very small share of the UK quota, by contrast, is foreign-owned (The total foreign ownership of British quotas is 13.2 per cent, third in the EU after Belgium and Denmark). Under current British rules, foreign-owned boats that hold quota shares must have one of five economic connections to the UK, such as a majority British crew or landing more than half their catch at British ports, to do so. (Note: The internationalisation facilitated by the CFP in British waters is demonstrated by the Jannetje Cornelis, a Dutch-owned, Dutch-crewed trawler built in Spain and registered to Hull that unloads most of the fish it catches in British waters at Boulogne in northern France for processing in the Netherlands and eventual sale in Spain and Italy.) Fishermen who advocated for Brexit would like to see those requirements tightened, proposing that ownership, crew and catch all meet 60 per cent thresholds, but due to unclear legal status, foreign companies holding quota under the old terms would likely sue to block such a law.

In Northern Ireland, 55 per cent of the almost exclusively British-owned quota is held by a single boat, the Voyager. This share was large enough that after the company that owned the 76-metre (249 ft) supertrawler decided it was time for a new boat and scrapped the old one in 2015, it turned a £2.5-million profit in the meantime by leasing the quotas to other fishermen until its new boat arrived in 2017. When that ship arrived, at 86 metres (282 ft), it was too large for the old ship's harbour at Kilkeel and so lands its catch outside the UK in Killybegs, Ireland's largest fishing port.

== Financial industry in the United Kingdom ==
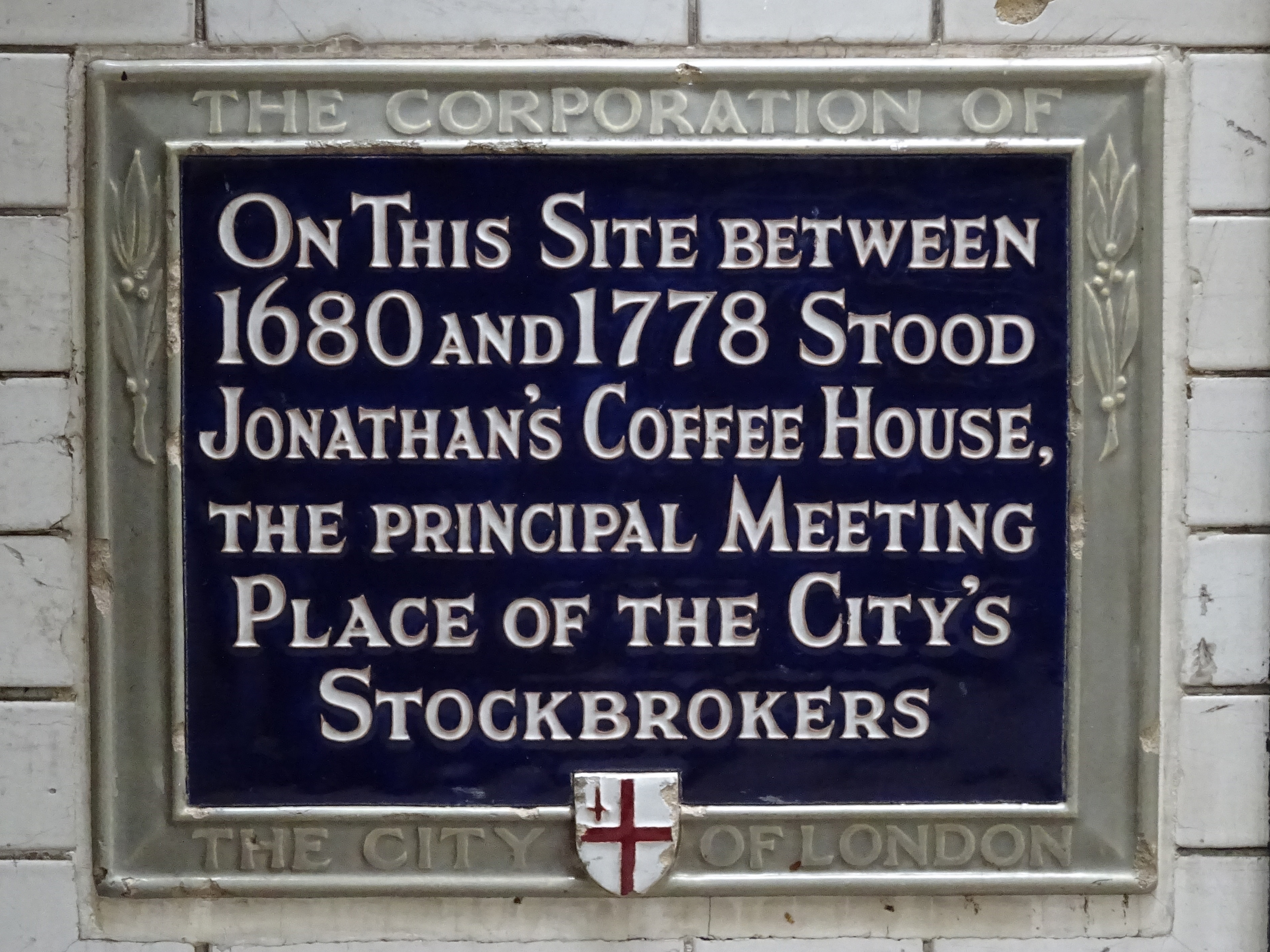
Plaque marking the site of Jonathan's Coffee-House in the City of London

London has been a commercial centre since its establishment within the bounds of the present City of London, later to be used metonymically to refer to the UK's financial industry, during Roman times; it has been the capital of England and, later, the United Kingdom ever since. In the 16th and 17th centuries, the modern British banking industry began to grow along with the rapidly expanding city, a magnet for immigrants, its economy fuelled by mercantile trade with Europe and the rest of the world. In 1571, financiers began congregating at Jonathan's Coffee-House to make deals and review regularly posted prices for securities and commodities, a group meeting from which the London Stock Exchange (LSE), the world's oldest, arose. The Bank of England, established privately in 1694 to fund the British government's expenses in the Nine Years' War, eventually became the UK's central bank.

The Bank established its offices early on in Walbrook in the City of London, moving in 1734 to its current home on Threadneedle Street, followed by other banks and financial services companies. For a while, the UK's financial industry was in the same neighbourhood as the centre of its fishing fleet, as reflected in street names still in use like Old Fish Street Hill. The Billingsgate Fish Market was originally situated nearby; it has since followed the banks to Canary Wharf. The venture capital industry grew out of the financing of high-risk, high-reward whaling expeditions.

At that time London competed as the centre of European finance with Amsterdam, whose financial innovations the British city's bankers, brokers and traders quickly brought into use. As the political and economic influence of the Netherlands declined in the 18th century, Paris emerged as a replacement rival. After the French Revolution of 1848 forced the Bank of France to suspend specie payments, London became, as Walter Bagehot put it 25 years later, "the sole great settling-house of exchange transactions in Europe ... The number of mercantile bills drawn upon London incalculably surpasses those drawn on any other European city; London is the place which receives more than any other place, and pays more than any other place, and therefore it is the natural 'clearing house.'"

World War I damaged London's position slightly, allowing New York to compete closely. The Bank of England was nationalised in 1946, but the city's banking interests still controlled its policy decisions, favouring the financial sector even as manufacturing declined, keeping the pound and interest rates high. In those years, New York overtook London, but then the Eurodollar market emerged in the 1950s, as a result of the Marshall Plan, and London's banks and traders were able to corner it, restoring London to its earlier position. By 1971, the Eurodollar market was equal in size to the French money supply and 160 banks from 48 countries had branches in London.

London gained comparative advantage due to lighter regulations under English common law, allowing its banks to lend to Communist countries during the Cold War more freely than their American competitors could, and its time zone, with the morning hours of the trading day overlapping with the end of the day in the emerging Asian markets and the later hours coinciding with New York's morning hours.

Reform began in 1979 with the removal of some foreign exchange controls imposed during World War II; the Eurodollar market had grown over a thousandfold by 1983 from what it was in 1960. In October 1986, London became even more attractive for international finance after Margaret Thatcher's government settled a competition law suit the previous government had brought against the LSE. The ensuing reform, known later as the "Big Bang", removed many remaining older traditions on the LSE, such as a prohibition on foreign membership, divisions of labour between market makers and brokers, fixed brokerage commissions and open outcry trading. The City itself went further, with many companies moving to pricing products in US dollars rather than pounds sterling and acting as intermediaries instead of lenders; by 1995, three years after the UK's membership in the EU made it part of the Single Market, the LSE's daily turnover had quadrupled.

The influx of foreign capital (Note: London has 22 branches of Islamic banks, more than all other Western countries combined.) led to many British banks and other financial institutions merging with or being acquired by larger American, (Note: US companies found the UK's business climate particularly attractive since, at the time, the US Congress had not yet repealed the Glass-Steagall Act, which had for several decades divided its banking industry into commercial and investment subsectors.) German, Swiss or Japanese companies, strengthening the city as a sector at the cost of much of its domestic ownership. Within a year of the Big Bang, 75 of the 300 LSE member companies were foreign-owned. "If it's not bolted to the floor we move it to London", an American banker told an analyst asking about his company's European operations.

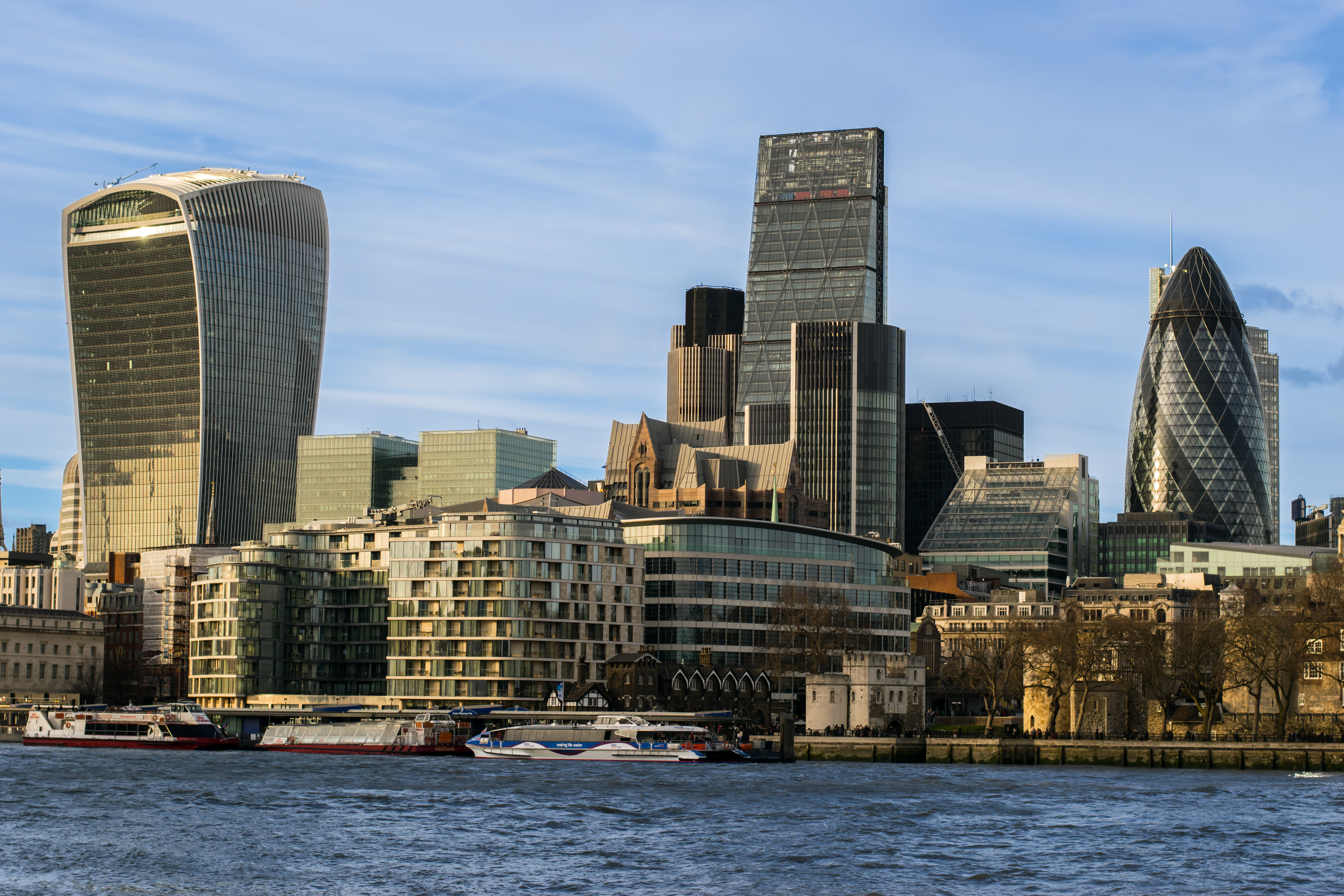
City of London skyline, 2016

Regulatory changes even affected the city's geography. The Bank of England had previously insisted all its banks have their offices within a 10-minute walk of the governor's office on Threadneedle Street near the City centre, but that rule was dropped when the Securities and Investments Board (later the Financial Services Authority (FSA)) was created to regulate the industry. This accelerated the move to construct and occupy new offices three miles (4.8 km) on the Isle of Dogs in Canary Wharf, an area of the Docklands that had been severely damaged by German bombs during the war. After some early struggles, Canary Wharf began attracting construction and companies by the end of the 20th century, its skyscrapers rivalling similar ones in the city as both dominated the London skyline.

Throughout the end of the 20th century, and into the 21st, the financial industry continued to grow and play an important role in the British economy as one of its most productive sectors, accounting for 16 per cent of all British exports, and 39 per cent of all exported services. To preserve the city's independence, the UK continued to use the pound and remained one of the few EU members outside of the Eurozone. Finance continued to grow at the expense of manufacturing, since the capital inflows kept the pound high, resulting in regular trade deficits. These were blamed for the widespread negative impacts of the 2008 financial crisis, which resulted in a change in how the industry was regulated, with the FSA dissolved in 2012 and its responsibilities split between the new Financial Conduct Authority, which enforces the laws regarding trading and products, and the Bank of England's Prudential Regulation Authority, trusted with maintaining the stability of the financial system as a whole.

=== Brexit ===
Prior to the Brexit referendum in 2016, financial companies were divided over the potential effects of the UK leaving the EU. As a member state, companies in the UK were granted "passporting" rights by the EU, allowing them to sell services and products to clients throughout all 26 other states without any special permission from those states. They also benefited from trade agreements between the EU and third parties, such as the US, with terms that might not be available if the UK alone negotiated them with those other countries or trading blocs. Much of the foreign capital drawn to the City came specifically to be within the single market and reap its benefits.

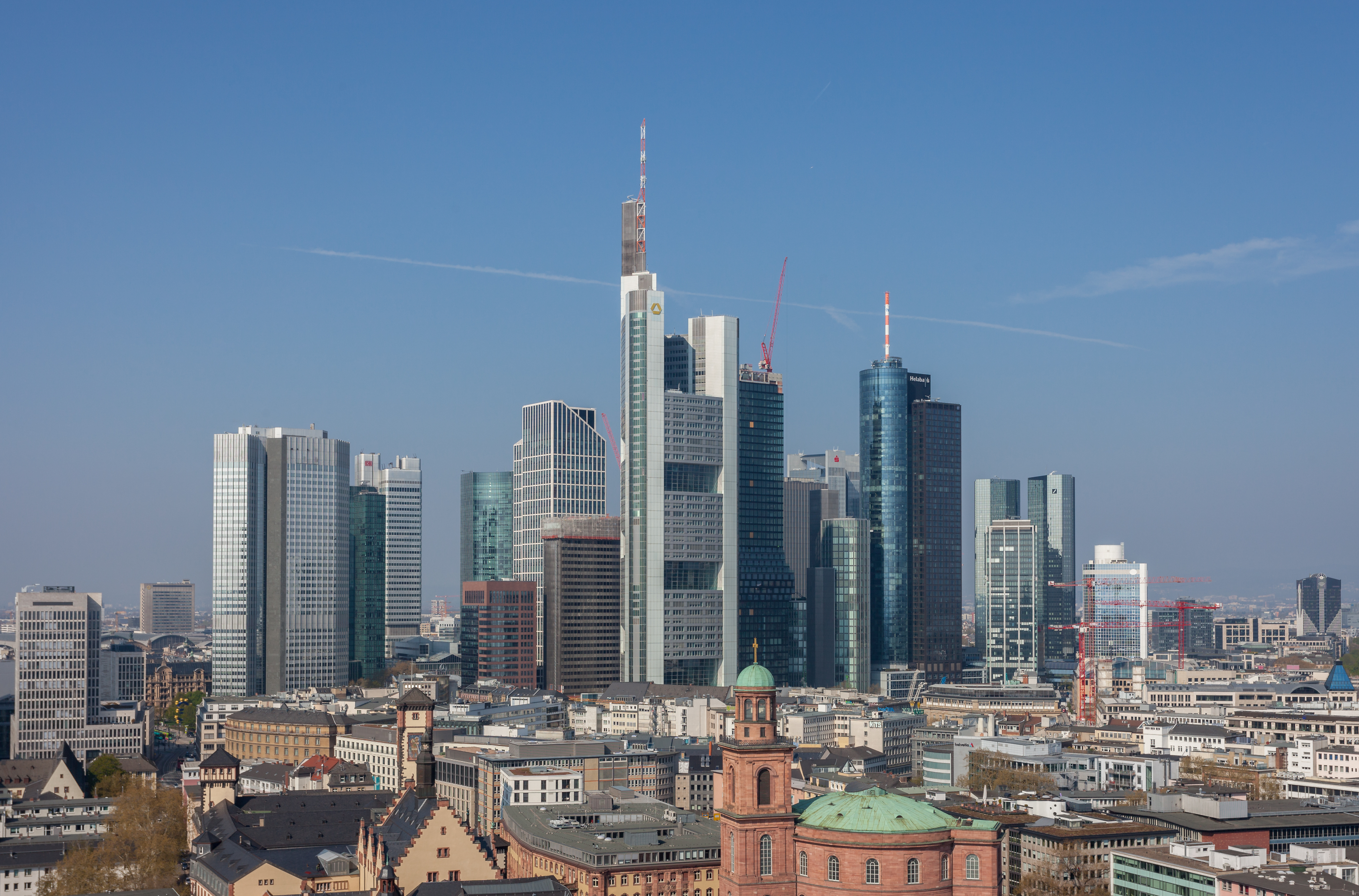
Frankfurt's financial district, a rival to the City

British financiers had been relieved the previous year when the European Court of Justice took the UK's side against the European Central Bank in invalidating a regulation that clearing houses that handle large euro-denominated transactions must be located in the eurozone. Had the regulation stood, it would have been an advantage for Frankfurt, the financial centre of the eurozone, with aspirations of displacing London eventually. Should the UK leave the EU, clearing houses believed they would have to relocate as they doubted the EU would allow such a large amount of transactions in its own currency to take place outside its jurisdiction.

London had built itself as a financial centre largely with the help of foreign talent, and continued to rely on it in the years leading up to the referendum. In 2017 more than twice as many workers in the city were natives of non-UK EU member states than on average for the UK, and in 2018 39 per cent of the City workforce were foreign-born. Tighter immigration restrictions and controls as a result of Brexit might affect their continued ability to work in the UK.

A minority of financiers believed the city would prosper outside of the EU. Howard Shore told The Guardian that EU rules were preventing venture capital trusts from adequately funding projects developed by researchers at British universities. He also felt that getting outside the jurisdiction of the EU's Markets in Financial Instruments Directive 2004 would benefit investors and financiers, and did not worry about losing access to the single market as Germany's Mittelstand, the small and medium-sized businesses that make up much of that country's manufacturing and service sectors, would insist on retaining access to London's financial services.

Shore said that most of the voices in the financial industry supporting Remain were the heads of banks and insurance companies, who tended to think in terms of the short terms during which they would hold those jobs. According to him, he preferred to think long term, and saw the real competitors after Brexit as being the US, Singapore and Hong Kong. "If we are going to have a level playing field with [them and] compete across the globe, we need to deregulate."

== Negotiations ==
Six weeks after the transition period began, final Brexit negotiations were impaired by the COVID-19 pandemic and the lockdowns and diversion of resources it required. Prime Minister Boris Johnson and both the UK's chief negotiator David Frost and his EU counterpart Michel Barnier were all taken ill with the virus. Talks continued, over Internet videoconferencing, but with little apparent progress.

Johnson said that he wants the UK's ultimate agreement with the EU to be like the Comprehensive Economic and Trade Agreement (CETA), concluded in 2014 between the Union and Canada, which, while eliminating most tariffs, maintains standards enforcement and does not guarantee frictionless trade. In a December 2017 presentation to heads of state and government at the European Council, Barnier, who in September that year had indicated his intention to teach the British people a "lesson" for leaving the EU, suggested the CETA relationship, similar to the EU's agreement with South Korea, would be the only outcome for both parties given the UK's red lines. In November 2019, Sir Ivan Rogers, the UK's last Permanent Representative to the EU before the Brexit vote, said in a speech that CETA is "much cited, but I fear not very well understood, by the Johnson Government", saying that it took years of negotiation to produce a document whose main section is 550 pages long, with appendices and annexes covering provisions specific to individual EU member states bringing the total page count to 6,000.

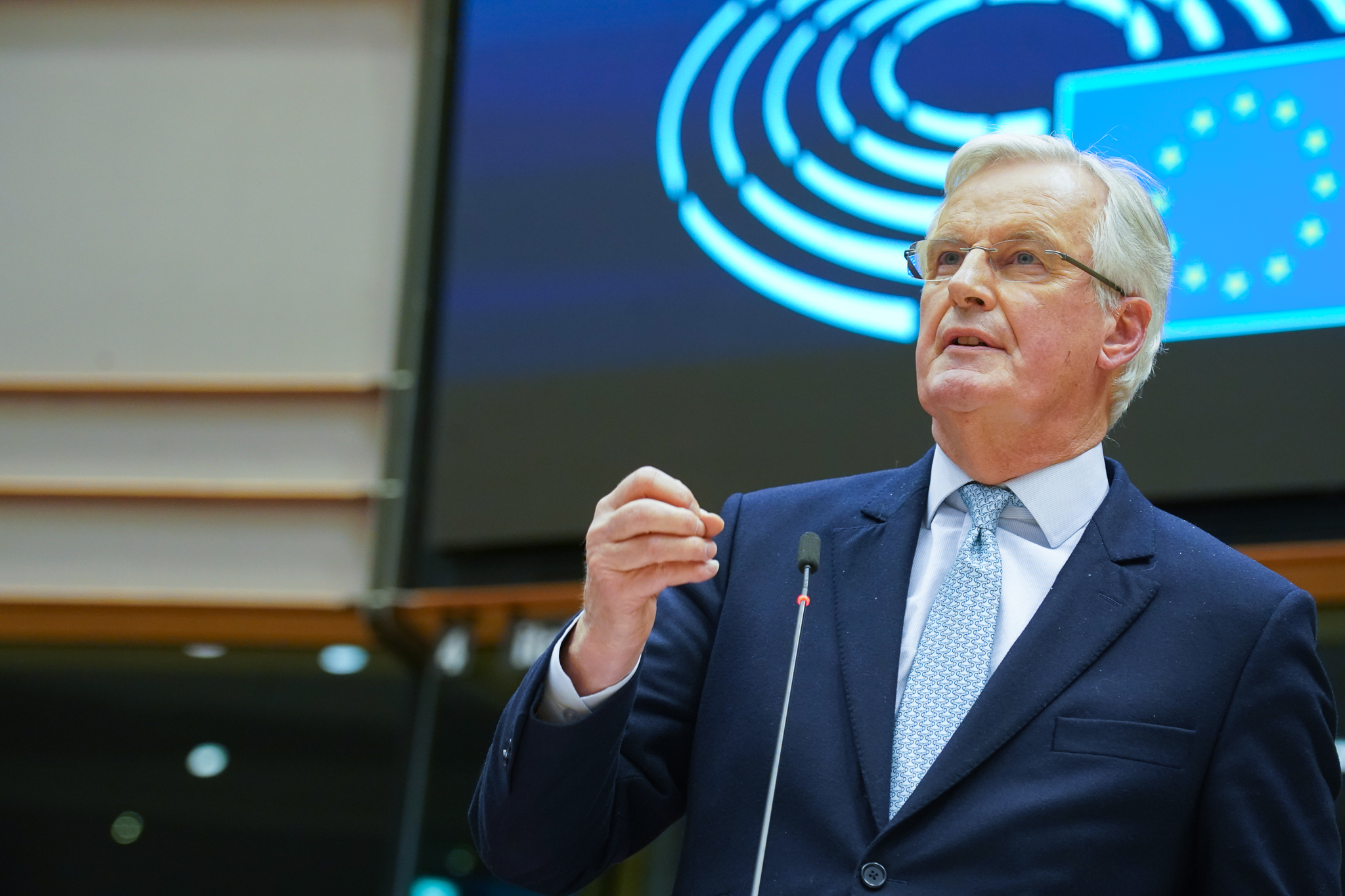
Michel Barnier, chief EU Brexit negotiator, during debate on the Withdrawal Agreement in the European Parliament

In February 2020, Barnier ruled out the possibility of an agreement similar to CETA, saying that unlike Canada, Japan or South Korea, the UK is immediately adjacent to the EU and cannot be so easily exempted from so many of its rules. "We remain ready to offer the UK an ambitious partnership: a trade agreement that includes in particular fishing", he said. The Prime Minister's office responded with a tweet showing the slide from Barnier's 2017 presentation and asking him "What's changed?"

Four months later Michael Gove, Minister for the Cabinet Office, confirmed that the government would not be seeking an extension at the end of June. The EU negotiating team said through a spokesman that the two sides would "intensify" the talks, with in-person meetings resuming, in order to have a draft agreement in place by October. Johnson had said after an earlier meeting with European Commission president Ursula von der Leyen that he was very optimistic that the two parties would have an agreement in place before the end of December.

The UK government's insistence on a brief timeline, even with the pandemic, has led to speculation that the economic effects of a hard no-deal Brexit, a major fear during 2019, might yet come to pass in the wake of a failure to reach a trade agreement should 2020, and with it all formal effects of the UK's EU membership, end without any broad trade agreement to replace them. This has been seen as an advantage to hard-line Brexiteers, as the economic effects of the pandemic for both the EU and UK have been severe enough that no-deal might not add to them significantly. (Note: Some commentators have suggested that the economic effect of those disruptions may actually make no-deal a more preferable, more likely option. "The economy after the crisis is going to look fundamentally different than before the crisis," says one Eurasia Group economist, "and the government wants a freer hand in reshaping that economy". One critic characterizes this argument as "because we've been thrown to the floor, we won't feel another kick." Johnson is also feeling political pressure as some of the harshest critics of his government's handling of the pandemic are also staunch Brexit supporters.) Even if the government were to be attempting to avoid that, the short timelines and the many issues involved mean no-deal appeared a real possibility.

In late July it was reported that the government was "giving up hope" for a deal before the end of the year, preparing to start 2021 that way and advising businesses to do the same. It held out hope for a minimal deal by October, but no more than that, putting the onus on the EU to demonstrate its commitment to reaching that deadline by getting serious about reaching an agreement no later than mid-August. German chancellor Angela Merkel likewise called for the EU to prepare more seriously for the same outcome.

Trust between the two ebbed when the UK government published the United Kingdom Internal Market Bill, designed to preserve the territorial integrity of the United Kingdom, on 9 September 2020, with Johnson having set an absolute deadline of 15 October for a deal to be reached. The Bill contained a clause which would allow a specific part of the Withdrawal Agreement to be overridden by barring any border checks between Northern Ireland and the rest of the UK. The EU demanded in turn that the bill be withdrawn by the end of the month or there would be no deal. The UK government ignored that demand, and the Bill went on to pass its second reading in the House of Commons on 15 September and its third on 29 September. The Bill then passed the House of Lords.

Meanwhile, negotiators on both sides agreed there was "cautious optimism" that a deal could be reached by mid-October, just ahead of a European Council summit, even as each called on the other to go further than that upbeat attitude by making significant concessions. The Internal Markets Bill, which one European called "the gun on the table", was cited as one place where the UK will have to make significant changes if it genuinely wants a deal; By the end of the month Johnson had delayed the bill's enshrinement until December, reportedly as a result of a London School of Economics report suggesting that exiting the EU without any deal could cause the UK far more economic harm than the pandemic has. At the beginning of October the European Commission informed the UK that it was beginning an infringement procedure, an action in the European Court of Justice alleging that a member state has failed to meet its obligations under the Treaty on the Functioning of the European Union, against it over the bill.

=== Positions ===
The UK's goals for the two industries in the talks are to secure greater control over its own waters while preserving the city's access to European markets on nearly the same terms. The EU, particularly its member nations whose fleets have come to depend on catches from British waters, wants to maintain the current situation, much as the UK does with finance; before the talks the EU states toughened Barnier's negotiating mandate to say that the agreement on fishing rights "build upon" the existing terms, instead of merely "upholding" them, one of the few instances where that was done. For the EU, a separate Fisheries Agreement is a keystone of any trade deal. "No fisheries agreement means no post-Brexit agreement" said François-Xavier Bellamy, the European Parliament's rapporteur for the negotiations. In an opinion piece for The Telegraph, former MEP Daniel Hannan wrote "the French want the UK to be treated like any other third country except with respect to their fishing waters, which they want to remain subject to the EU's Common Fisheries Policy". The UK by contrast sees the agreements as separate issues; the EU member states that are either landlocked or have only Baltic, Black Sea or Mediterranean coasts may be more willing to compromise.

Advocates for both sectors fear that their interests will be traded away for the benefit of the other. "[I]nstead of increasing their quotas severalfold, UK fishermen could be forced to make sacrifices to maintain the lifestyles of the UK's bankers and fund managers. It hardly seems fair, does it?" wrote Prospect. Conversely, "[t]hrowing your most profitable industry to the wolves is apparently necessary to prove that you are Taking Back Control of an industry that you haven't really needed for centuries", a Forbes writer taking the city's side complained. "This is what passes for trade policy in U.K. government circles right now."

"In Britain fish and finance are ultimately two sides of the same Brexit coin", the Financial Times observed at the beginning of 2020. "One the very expression of the desire to take back control, the other the seizing of borderless opportunity. Which one wins out will be a signal of the course the UK charts for its post-EU future."

=== Fishing ===
[W]hat if the chip never gets bargained away but becomes the game itself?
— Keith Johnson, "So Long, and Say Thanks for All the Fish", Foreign Policy, February 2020

Andrew Goodwin, chief UK economist at consulting company Oxford Economics, specifically cited fishing as a potential stumbling block in negotiations. As an industry highlighted by the Leave campaign as having been adversely affected by the UK's EU membership, fishing has become a very emotional issue despite its minuscule size within the overall British economy. The entire industry, including processing and farming, amounts to 0.14 per cent of the UK's gross domestic product (GDP), with revenues of £1.4 billion a year. (less than the Harrods department store), and employs 24,000 people, less than 0.1 per cent of the British workforce. By comparison, the financial sector's £132 billion 2018 in revenue, including a £44 billion trade surplus, (Note: British fishing also runs a trade surplus of £230 million.) accounts for 6.9 per cent of the UK's GDP, contributing £29 billion in tax. The 1.1 million people employed in the field make up 3.1 per cent of the workforce.

In mid-May, Barnier, formerly France's fisheries minister, said that the two sides had been able to start a dialogue, although they were far from any agreement. By July, it was reported that the EU was willing to concede to the UK's demand that fishing quotas be based on zonal attachment, or scientific data on where fish species are presently located, rather than the historically based relative stability approach long used by the EU to allocate quotas under the CFP; this would likely increase the amount of fish British fishermen could catch at the expense of the EU countries. Zonal attachment already governs the fishing relationship between the EU and Norway, and like that deal the UK wants to see quotas renegotiated annually. The EU for its part, citing the dependence of so many Western European fishing fleets on British waters, wants an agreement that can only be renegotiated if both sides agree it, good for 25 years. Norway's annual renegotiations are possible only because there are far fewer species of fish in its waters. (Note: Shortly after the referendum, Norwegian officials warned their British counterparts that they should not expect to see much if any enlargement of their quotas through negotiations with the EU.)

In September 2019, with the 31 October deadline then looming, the UK and Norway signed an agreement allowing fishermen of both countries to continue fishing in each other's waters under the same terms that had been negotiated between Norway and the EU. A year later, the UK and Norway reached the former's first independent fisheries agreement in 40 years, which includes annual renegotiations of quotas. British officials cited these terms as a model for the EU, saying it showed respect for both nations' status as independent coastal states and calling the bloc's position "the aberration in international fisheries terms." The first attempt to negotiate an annual agreement between the two countries failed in April 2021, leaving British fishermen without access to Norwegian waters and their cod for that year. In Hull, this meant that the factory trawler Kirkella, the only distant-waters ship in the British fleet, estimated in previous years to provide one of every 12 cod or haddock fillets eaten in British chip shops, has had to avoid Norwegian waters, making only one trip during 2021 to the international waters in the Barents Sea near the Svalbard archipelago, spending nine weeks at sea instead of six to bring back lower-quality fish; it was in dry dock in Norway and it was reported that it would not sail again until that country can negotiate a deal with the UK. The processing industry is doing well, but fish prices for chip shops were expected to increase later in the year once UK Fisheries, the Kirkella's owner, runs out of the frozen fish it stockpiled before the pandemic and all fish must be imported until a new Norwegian deal is reached.

Rogers, in his November 2019 lecture at Glasgow University, doubted that negotiations on fisheries would result in any significant change. "[I]t is very hard to see why the eight fishing member states will be prepared to see any losses as a result of Brexit in what is a pretty zero sum game sector", he said. "Their moment of maximum leverage on fish is next year, and they know it." Rogers believed that Johnson might try to spin whatever minor changes he is able to win as a radically different deal, but that might not placate the hardline Brexiteers who had chosen him as party leader after May stepped down.

On the EU side, complaints that the CFP has impoverished British fishermen seem hollow against the necessity of balancing the interests of the two industries and both parties. "You could ask whether it's fair that the City of London gets access to all of Europe", says Daniel Fasquelle, a member of the French National Assembly for the department of Pas-de-Calais, where many French fishermen are based, in response to British complaints about the unfairness of the CFP. "The UK doesn't consume anywhere close to all the fish that's taken in its waters. They need access to our markets."

In late September 2020, amid optimism about the possibility of yet reaching a deal by mid-October after the UK's government delayed final consideration of the Internal Markets Bill until the end of the year, negotiators from both sides suggested to The Telegraph that an agreement could be reached on fishing if both sides made the effort. It would in principle allow for an increase in the UK's quotas over time, although many details still had to be worked out. At the end of the month the UK, too, had offered a three-year transition period to phase in the lower EU quotas.

Spokesmen for fishing interests on both sides insisted that their positions remained unchanged. "There is no expectation within the UK fishing industry that the UK will back down on fisheries", said Barrie Deas, head of the UK's National Federation of Fishing Organisations (NFFO). "If anything, the commitments that have been made to the industry are stronger now than when the negotiations started." A diplomat from a coastal EU state similarly said "We are not for a gradual withdrawal of quotas. We are for permanent quotas."

On both sides, the fishing and finance issues were linked. "If everything should carry on in relation to fishing, why should it not carry on in relation to financial markets?" asked Sir Richard Packer, who after heading the UK's negotiating team during the original CFP talks served as Permanent Secretary at the Ministry of Agriculture, Fisheries and Food for the rest of the 20th century. Mogens Schou, a Danish government fisheries official during the same period, likewise says "it is not a question of rights, but about negotiating a package on mutual interests in fishing, in trade relations and banking, and what you can put on the table."

As October began, the Financial Times summarized the status of the talks on fishing as having led to "no meaningful progress" and that it would be "among the very last unsolved issues: a scenario Brussels had fought to avoid." Frost conceded that on fisheries, "the gap between us is unfortunately very large and, without further realism and flexibility from the EU, risks being impossible to bridge." European Commission president Ursula von der Leyen said all issues were "still completely open" and minimised the role of fishing in stalling the talks.

During the next three months, a deal was on several occasions reported to be imminent, but by late December the negotiations had not been completed. Fishing was one of the several areas with outstanding issues with both sides sticking to their original positions. The EU were proposing to give up 18 per cent of its quotas in British waters over the next ten years, while the UK were proposing 60 per cent over three years. The UK also wanted its 12-mile zone to be reserved for British vessels. The UK also tabled a paper setting out requirements for British-flagged vessels fishing in British waters that were not exclusively British owned and crewed. In that case, a proportion of their catch from British waters had to be landed at British ports. In addition, the UK proposed that quotas for pelagic fish stocks such as herring, whiting and mackerel be left out of the agreement altogether and instead negotiated by an informal international forum including the Faroes, Greenland, Iceland, Norway and Russia.

==== Reactions to agreement ====
On 24 December, the UK and EU announced they had reached a deal. Its fishing provisions included a reduction in the EU's quotas in British waters to be phased in over the next five years, during three of which EU boats will continue to be allowed to fish in those inshore waters where they have been. Deas said that Johnson was "willing to sacrifice fishing" to get a deal and that the UK was entitled to even greater quotas than it had negotiated under international law. "I think there will be frustration and anger across the industry about that", he said. A spokesmen for Scottish salmon producers said that while the industry was glad a deal had been reached, there would be "lots more red tape, bureaucracy and paperwork" to deal with.

Fishermen the Daily Telegraph spoke with echoed Deas. "It seems we have been totally sold down the river, and it's not the deal we envisaged or even wanted", said Richard Brewer, a sixth-generation Whitby fisherman who runs a trawler with his sons. Scotsman Aaron Brown, a cofounder of Fishing for Leave, said that Johnson had "bottled it", and fishing should never have been made part of overall trade negotiations to begin with. "The EU has essentially got what it wanted. Everybody knows how Brussels works."

The SFF also called the agreement "hugely disappointing". In a measured statement, the organisation's chief executive, Elspeth Fitzgerald, said that while the SFF had not yet read the full document, and was waiting for specifics from the government on the effect on particular species, "the principles that the Government said it supported—control over access, quota shares based on zonal attachment, annual negotiations—do not appear to be central to the agreement."

English fishermen in Newlyn, near Land's End, one of the country's largest ports, were similarly dismissive. "We had the opportunity to actually take back control and we've passed it up", said one. He and others were particularly angry that EU vessels would be able to fish inshore waters for several more years. It was the "most galling kick in the teeth for us", said another, who likened Johnson's betrayal of the industry to Heath's, but worse.

In mid-January 2021, Victoria Prentis, then Parliamentary Undersecretary for Agriculture, Fisheries and Food, told the environment subcommittee of the House of Lords' European Union Committee that she had not been able to read the agreement when it had been announced as it was Christmas Eve and she was busy organising the local nativity trail with her husband. Scottish National Party Brexit spokeswoman Philippa Whitford called for Prentis's resignation, but the government maintained its full confidence in her.

Fishing interests in the Republic of Ireland, a member of the EU, expressed concerns. Charlie McConalogue, the country's Minister for Agriculture, Food and the Marine, complained at the end of January, in advance of a March meeting to set quotas for the rest of the year, that the agreement had disproportionately affected the republic, with the country's quota losses coming to twice that of any other EU member state, estimated by his government at €43 million. Sean O'Donoghue, head of the Killybegs Fishermen's Organisation, the republic's largest fishing lobby group, believes it is closer to €188 million. He was particularly upset that the UK has been asserting sovereignty over the waters around the uninhabitable islet of Rockall, 200 miles west of the Outer Hebrides, waters rich in mackerel, the republic's most exported species, that largely mate and spawn in the republic's waters.

=== Finance ===
While it is believed that the UK has the advantage on fish, since after Brexit it will have the absolute right to restrict access to the waters around Great Britain and Northern Ireland, the EU could regain the "maximum leverage" Ivan Rogers spoke of with pressure on the financial sector. The City seeks the stock market equivalence required by the EU's Markets in Financial Instruments Directive 2004 (MiFid), under which shares of EU companies may be traded on foreign exchanges if their regulations are deemed to offer the same amount of investor protection as the EU's. Currently only the US, Australian and Hong Kong exchanges have that equivalence Early in the Brexit process the UK allowed all EU firms access on the current terms through 2023, after which they may apply for continued access under terms yet to be defined.

The European Securities and Markets Authority (ESMA), the EU's financial regulatory body, is monitoring how the UK applies EU rules to its financial markets during the 2020 transition period as part of its equivalence determination; in July the EU granted temporary equivalence, starting in January 2021, to central counterparty clearing houses located in the UK. (Note: Philip Aldrick, economics editor for The Times, calls this action a 'land grab' by the EU, since the sudden and large capital movements that might otherwise take place from the UK to the EU after Brexit becomes final in the absence of agreement over this issue would cause significant market disruption. But London remains popular with investors—LCH's share of euro-denominated swaps has remained above 90 per cent of the total market since the referendum; efforts by Frankfurt-based Eurex Exchange to lure business there have not had much of an impact. In mid-January, it was reported that trades in euro-denominated derivatives on Swap Execution Facilities in New York, which has EU equivalence, had doubled as a portion of all derivative trades by mid-January.) Since British financial law and regulations are currently aligned with the EU's, which were drafted in part by British regulators, as a result of the country's years of membership, the city could easily gain equivalence by leaving them unchanged. Johnson has promised, however, that the UK will not be a "rule taker" after Brexit, meaning the UK will write its financial rules with its own interests in mind rather than simply adopt the EU's as its own, which would likely lower the chances of equivalence being granted so readily, if at all. By the originally agreed deadline of 30 June for mutual equivalence determinations, the UK had only returned four of the 28 questionnaires about its regulatory regime sent it by the EU.

Even if granted, equivalence may be a means for the EU to pressure the UK. Stock exchanges in Switzerland, a non-EU member landlocked country almost surrounded by the EU, were granted temporary equivalence at the end of 2017. In the midst of broader trade negotiations between the two, the EU let the equivalence expire in at the end of June 2019. Swiss authorities responded to the loss of permission for EU companies to trade their shares on Swiss exchanges by reciprocally banning EU exchanges from listing the shares of Swiss companies.

A year later, as of 2020, equivalence had not been restored, but ESMA issued a report on MiFid calling for a simplification of transparency requirements, a proposal seen as loosening EU regulations in a way that would make it easier for investors within the trade bloc to trade directly on exchanges outside the EU, possibly in the process making British equivalence more likely. Still, fears persisted that the EU will "weaponise" equivalence. "Are you going to be comfortable with building a business model on that?" asks one British banking official. Swiss banks and other financial services firms have been increasingly moving services to Frankfurt and Madrid to eliminate this uncertainty.

Even if granted without reservation, equivalence may not be enough. "The big problem with equivalence (known about for years) is that it's entirely inferior to the U.K.'s current privileges as an EU member" writes Bloomberg columnist Lionel Laurent. "It's available only for some parts of the finance industry such as securities trading, but not for wholesale and retail banking. Retail investment funds, payments and insurance brokers are excluded too."

With negotiations still ongoing in July 2020, the UK and Switzerland opened up their own negotiations on a joint financial services agreement, after the UK found Swiss stock market regulation to be equivalent to its own a year to the day after the EU let its own determination expire. The two nations will begin talks in September and assess where they are at the beginning of 2021. Chancellor of the Exchequer Rishi Sunak described the agreement as demonstrating that different sets of regulations do not have to be exactly the same as each other to achieve equivalence, respecting different countries' traditions and sovereignty.

Leave supporters may not find the Swiss relationship with the EU, which they often cite as a model, to be the clean break they were expecting, Rogers warned in his speech. "[Switzerland] ... lives in a near-constant negotiation with the EU. So will we. Even if we go 'no deal'. Maybe it's time to tell the public that?" Around the same time French historian Joseph de Weck, a former Swiss trade negotiator, said in an opinion piece in EURACTIV that Switzerland has effectively become a "rule taker", with the country's businesses routinely lobbying their government to "simply copy-paste EU laws—be it regulations on chemical products or data protection rules."

Dutch journalist Caroline de Gruyter warned of this phenomenon, which she reports is called the "fax economy" by Norwegians who have similarly seen their government adopt EU rules with minimal amendment, (Note: Norway's parliament was reported in 2016 to adopt five EU laws for every day it sits, to the point that three-quarters of all EU laws are now part of Norway's statutes.) a year before the Brexit vote. She observes that this process, which she attributes to globalisation as pressure from the US has contributed to it as much as that from the EU, has contributed to a decline in civic involvement, particularly voter turnout, as Switzerland becomes more and more governed under rules it has no voice in writing, with only the right-wing nationalist Swiss People's Party gaining at the ballot box. "It doesn't matter how we vote", a local official in the country complained to De Gruyter. "Every year, we get more EU regulation via the back door."

By mid-October, the consensus in the British financial industry was that the government had chosen fishing. The city's general support for Remain during the referendum campaign "did not endear it to the Brexiteers who now run Britain", The Economist reported, "and who know that there are more votes in protecting fishermen than moneymen." Miles Celic, head of TheCityUK, which lobbies for the industry, said the government sees the city as "big and tough enough to look after itself."

Philip Aldrick, economic editor of The Times, complained in an opinion column that the government had betrayed the British financial sector. "Brussels has walked over us and, frankly, the government no longer cares. What matters is fishing ... to deliver a semblance of sovereignty", he wrote. He conceded that some deal might yet happen at the last minute, but whatever it was would not include finance: "That issue is concluded and should be seen as a stain on the government's record." Aldrick allowed that the complete absence of EU regulations, particularly the required leverage ratio, would be beneficial as it would lower costs for smaller banks, make larger ones more resilient and simplify monetary policy.

At the end of November, with the deadline for an agreement looming, ESMA announced that all euro-denominated derivatives trading would have to take place either within the EU or on an equivalent market such as the US, Australia or Hong Kong once 2021 begins. Since London had become the most popular derivatives market in the world, this was seen a "hardball" move by the EU as parties to transactions will have to choose between executing the trade in the UK or the EU, fragmenting liquidity assuming the trade was even possible. "[T]his is the EU telling the UK—this is your mess, you can sort it out" said an Ashurst lawyer who follows regulation.

ESMA also indicated it might review the "delegation" rules that allow investment funds domiciled in low-tax jurisdictions within the EU such as Ireland or Luxembourg to be managed from outside the EU as long as those markets have equivalence determinations. Currently, £2.1 trillion, nearly a quarter of the assets managed by British banks, are domiciled in the EU. "If you can prise much of that industry away from London then you really start to tip the balance of power", observes the head of international services at Bank of America.

When the UK and the EU reached their agreement before Christmas, it had little for finance. Johnson said it "perhaps does not go as far as we would like" for the city. The two sides agreed to continue negotiations on finance, setting March as their deadline for a memorandum of understanding (MOU).

At the end of March the two sides announced that they had reached a framework for negotiating the MOU and that negotiations would continue. The British financial sector welcomed the development but remained restive, as jobs and assets continued to be moved from the city to various locations in the EU. The bloc had decided to allow individual states to decide the equivalence question; some such as Italy had granted it but others like the Netherlands had not. "Politicians protected the fish, but sold us bankers down the river", one Goldman Sachs banker complained.

== Possible consequences of failure to reach agreement ==
In June, Frost described the EU's position on fisheries as "manifestly unbalanced." A month later, it was reported that the UK government expected to miss the 31 July deadline and was preparing to continue trading with the EU under World Trade Organization (WTO) rules in 2021 if no agreement was reached. Germany, at the time holding the EU's rotating presidency, called on the UK to be "more realistic" in its negotiating positions, following a presentation to member states by Barnier on the status of the talks. This was seen as a setback to the UK's government, which had hoped Germany, and perhaps Italy, with less stake in the fisheries issue, would be able to persuade the French and the other seven fishing states to back down. Barnier believed that an agreement would need to be reached no later than October to allow enough time for ratification by the UK and EU members by the end of the year. The UK's Environment Secretary, George Eustice, told the media in early July that he did not think any deal could be finalised until December By mid-August, "the contours of a compromise" were reportedly emerging, but it was still seen as likely that any deal would come near the end of the transition period, as it eventually did.

=== Effects on fishing ===
Should a deal not be reached or in effect by 2021, all trade between the EU and UK will revert to WTO terms until or unless an agreement is reached. British waters will, under UNCLOS, be exclusively the UK's to govern as it chooses, as an independent coastal state. The CFP would no longer apply. Both developments would, or are seen as likely to be, a significant impact on fishing.

==== Tariffs and customs inspections ====
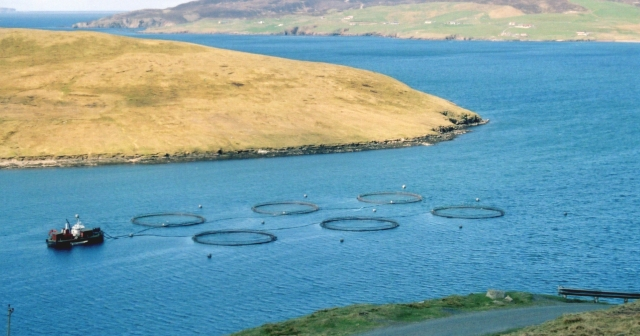
Fish farm in the Shetland Islands

Under WTO rules, all fish products exported to the EU would be assessed a 9.6 per cent tariff, and under EU law they would be subject to additional customs procedures as well as regular sanitary and phytosanitary measures they are currently exempt from outside spot checks. A retired Scottish fishing boat captain, John Buchan, says these checks will have a more adverse effect on the market value of British langoustine than any tariffs. "I've heard it said that premium products like top quality Scottish langoustine will find its way to market because of demand." he told The Press and Journal. "The problem is that it won't be prime quality if it's had to sit several days in a lorry at Calais, or in a customs warehouse, waiting to be cleared." Delays caused by the sanitary and phytosanitary checks may be further extended by limited capacity in France: the EU-designated Border Inspection Post on French side of the Channel where those checks can be undertaken is not in Calais but Dunkirk, 45 kilometres (28 mi) away, and it is only open a for a few hours every weekday. (Note: The New Economics Foundation reports that the Dunkirk station can only handle 15 sanitary and phytosanitary inspections a day.)

The EU's current tariff on cod imports from countries with most favoured nation (MFN) status is even higher, at 12 per cent. Some sectors of the British fishing industry have already calculated the economic impact of those tariffs. The Scottish Seafood Association (SSA) has estimated an added cost of £160 per transaction, or £34 million per year to the entire Scottish fishing industry, an amount its president told the Scottish National Party's 2019 conference would be "catastrophic".

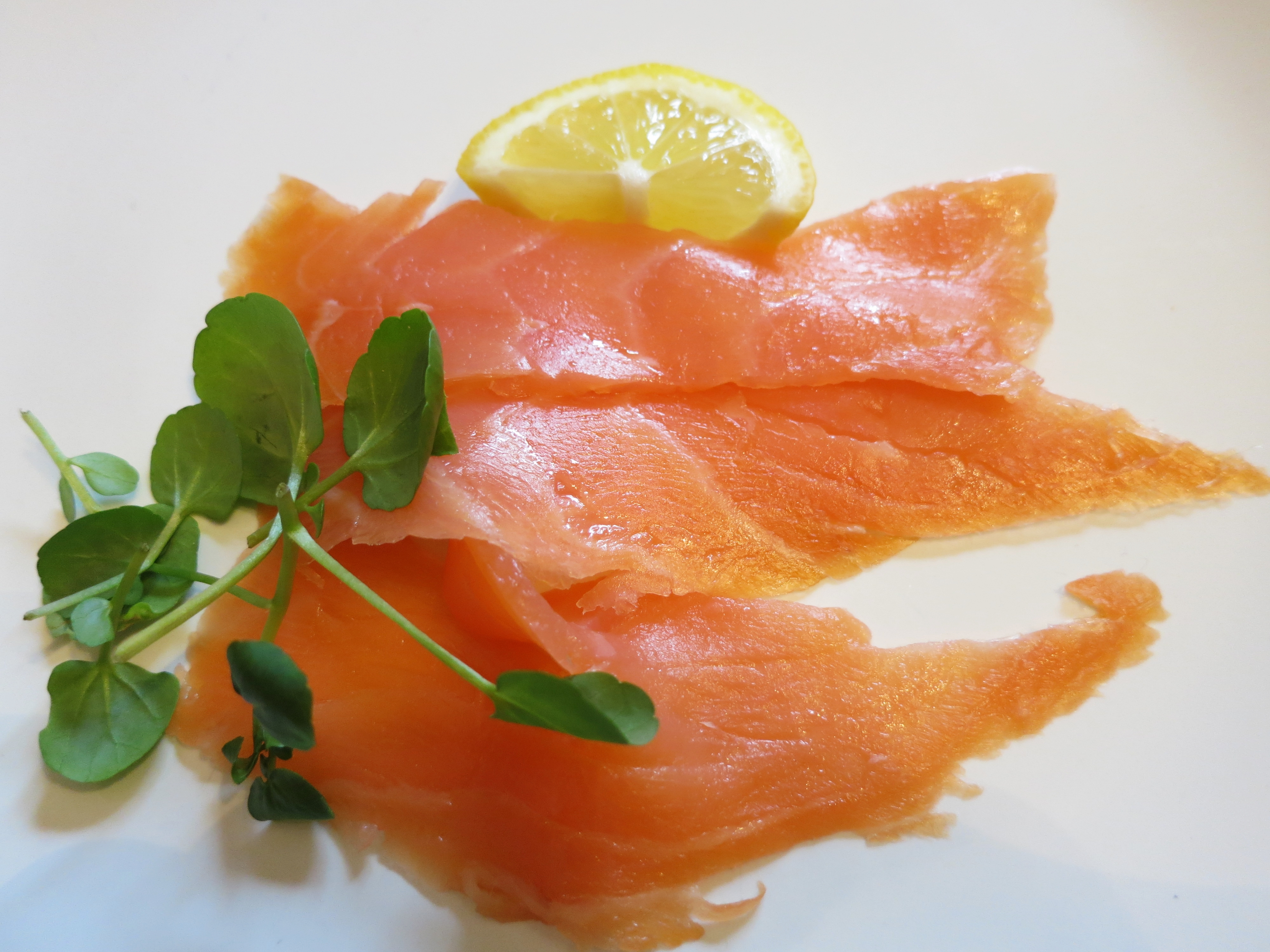
Smoked salmon, the UK's leading seafood export to the EU

Smoked salmon, raised on Scottish fish farms and very popular in the EU, which annually consumes £250 million (half the total exported) of the UK's biggest food export, faces an EU MFN tariff of 13 per cent. Shellfishermen, whose catch has never been subject to CFP restrictions and is heavily exported to the EU, have estimated a £41 million cost to their sector. (Note: In February 2021, a Welsh fisherman who harvested mussels, for which the market is almost exclusively EU countries, learned that he no longer could export to them since the water quality rating the British government gives the Menai Strait is not high enough for EU consumption unless the mussels are depurated first, which had up to then been done in the EU due to a shortage of capacity in the UK, a consequence of Brexit he had said was likely almost two years earlier, hoping the government would address it before Brexit became complete. He estimated that he will have to leave "a couple of hundred tons" of the shellfish, valued at €160,000, in the strait's floor and make half his staff redundant.) The Falkland Islands, 8,000 miles (13,000 km) from the British Isles, have come to prosper from exports of squid to Spain, which takes 82 per cent of its annual catch for calamari, and would be adversely affected by higher tariffs.

After the EU–UK Trade and Cooperation Agreement was adopted in January 2021, and with the travel and business restrictions in response to the new Covid variant which was spreading fast in the UK from mid-December, Scottish inshore fishermen saw some of these fears become reality. Exporting fish to France became a 25-step process, (Note: The BBC reported on how one Dorset firm required 71 pages of paperwork, as well as additional time and expense, for a single lorry of fish shipped to France.) and shipments lost value either partially or completely, putting some companies in danger of bankruptcy due to delays when paperwork didn't completely agree, a situation SSA head Jimmy Buchan called "red tape gone crazy". By the middle of January the Scottish government estimated that the new controls had cost the fishing industry £7 billion. The UK government said many of the problems were caused by Covid cross-border travel restrictions and that there was no longer a market for fish in France due to the closure of fish restaurants as a result of Covid measures being taken there. In March the Office for National Statistics reported that British seafood and shellfish exports to the EU had dropped 83 per cent during January, the most of any foodstuffs category.

In response to a request for a debate on the effects of Brexit on Scottish fishing from Scottish National Party Commons Scottish Spokesperson Tommy Sheppard, Jacob Rees-Mogg, Leader of the House, defended the government. "The key thing is we've got our fish back", he said. "They're now British fish and they're better and happier fish for it."

==== Exclusion from territorial waters ====
The costs and delays likely to arise from increased tariffs and the reimposition of customs procedures might be compounded if the UK and/or EU exclude boats from the other side from their waters, as they will have the legal right to if there is no deal in January, possibly in retaliation for those actions. If the UK bars all EU boats from its EEZ, the EU could see immediate and serious effects due to its great dependence on them. Processing plants as far away as the island of Rügen off the northeastern German Baltic coast, in Merkel's Bundestag constituency, depend on daily deliveries of herring freshly caught off Shetland by Danish trawlers.

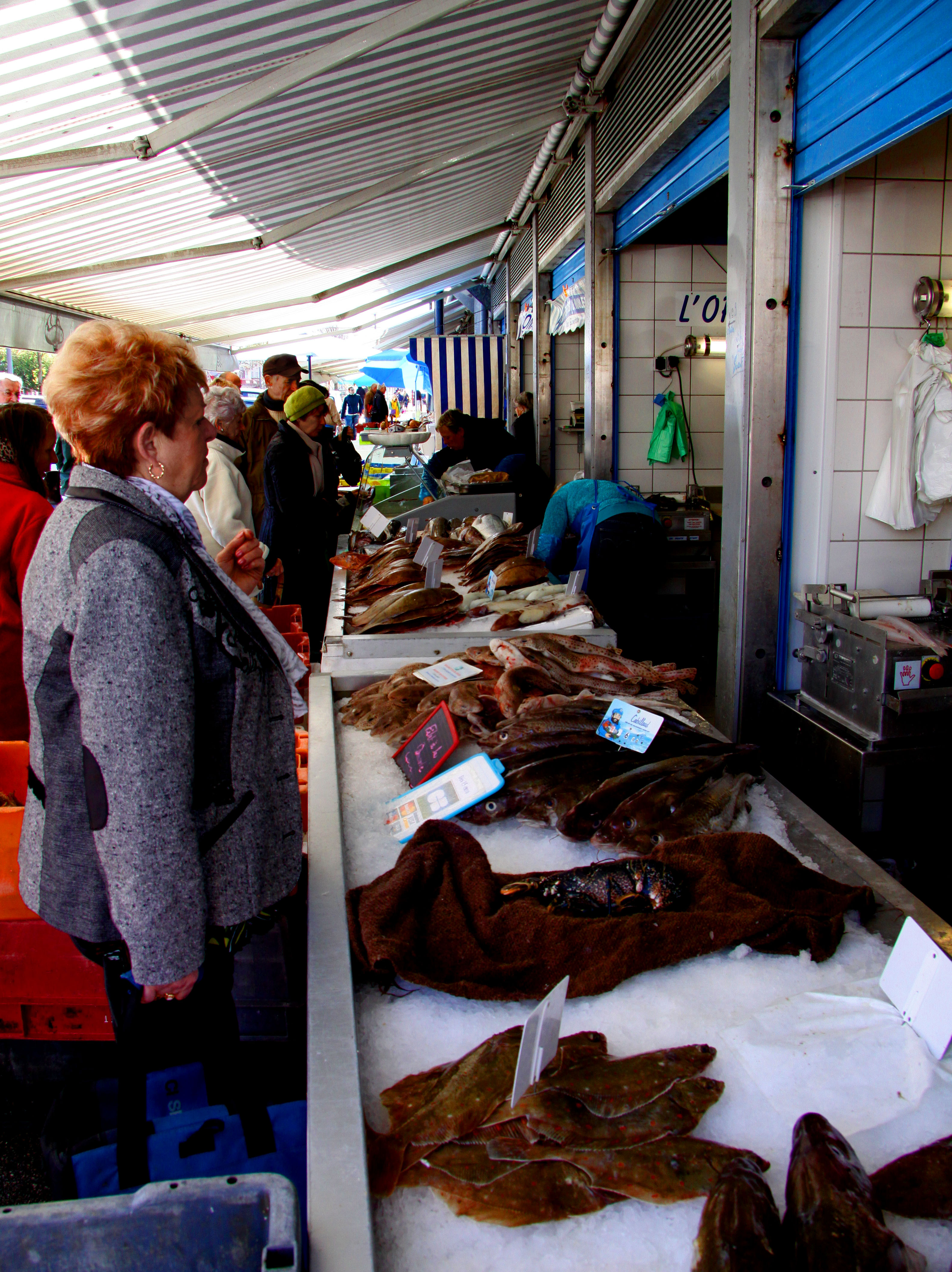
Fish for sale at the Boulogne-sur-Mer market

In France, even ships that source less than a third of their catch from British waters could face bankruptcy; at Boulogne-sur-Mer on the English Channel opposite Dover, France's largest fishing port, half of the fish landed are caught in British waters. (Note: There would be some impact on British fishing should UK boats be similarly barred from EU waters. The New Economics Foundation stated that 15 per cent of the British fleet's catch, by value, was taken in EU waters, based on 2016 data from the Marine Management Organisation (MMO); the MMO's own data for 2018 show about 2,700 tonnes, or £3.8 million, of landings by British fishing vessels taken from areas inside the current EU EEZ like the seas west of Ireland and the Bay of Biscay. Barrie Deas, head of the UK's National Federation of Fishing Organisations, said in 2016, during testimony before the House of Lords' European Union Committee that British fishermen "need access, we want access, to Irish waters, to French waters" where they fish for hake and scallops respectively.) Hubert Carré, director general of the Comité National des Pêches Maritimes et des Élevages Marins, a French fishing organisation, estimated in 2017 that half of all French fishermen could go bankrupt if excluded from British waters, with the remainder seeing a 15 per cent loss in wages. Belgian fishermen, with the EU's smallest fleet by total vessels, would lose about half their catch; a fishing organisation spokesman there says that while the country's fleet would probably fish elsewhere in the North Sea at first, it would not be able to make up the difference that way. Spanish fishermen would be less affected due to their ownership interests in British boats predating their country's accession to the EU.

Fishermen of the Republic of Ireland in particular fear what might happen should they, as an EU state, find they can no longer fish in UK waters, where they currently land 34 per cent of their total catch, including 64 per cent of their mackerel and 43 per cent of the prawns they take, the largest two species in the catch; in the short run the loss of access to British waters would under one estimate make half the Republic of Ireland's fishing industry, already feeling pressure from British competitors who have been able to significantly reduce their costs, superfluous. In the long run, EU ships may turn to the Republic of Ireland's waters, equally as rich as the UK's, to make up for the losses, and between their greater numbers and larger quotas under the CFP Irish fishermen fear serious depletion of stocks may soon result. Michael Creed, the Republic of Ireland's fisheries minister until June, says it would be "calamitous" for the country's fishermen if they are unable to preserve their fishing rights in British waters as part of any Brexit deal.

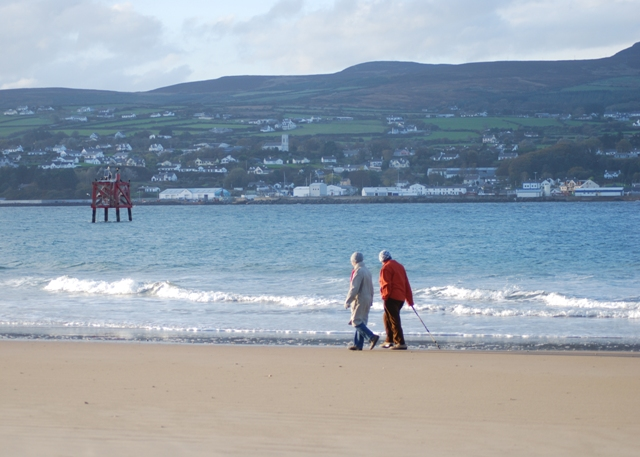
Greencastle seen from Magilligan on the British side of Lough Foyle

Which waters are in Northern Ireland and thus the UK's, and which are the Republic of Ireland's, is also a potential point of dispute. The border between Northern Ireland and the Republic of Ireland meets the sea at two navigable inlets, Lough Foyle in the northwest and Carlingford Lough in the east, both of which are fished by boats from both nations. In the century since Irish independence, the two states have not negotiated, much less agreed, where in those waters their border lies. "Can you imagine telling fishermen from Greencastle that they can no longer fish outside their back door?" asks O'Donoghue, alluding to an Irish port in County Donegal at the mouth of Lough Foyle, a half-mile (800 m) across the water from British Magilligan Point.

Both the EU and the UK have anticipated the possible adverse economic effects of a no-deal final Brexit on their fishing industries. Early in 2019, Karmenu Vella, European Commissioner for the Environment, Marine Affairs and Fisheries, said that if the UK were to exclude EU fishing boats from its waters, there would be "significant negative economic consequences on the part of the EU fleet". The Commission would authorise member states to set up compensation programmes in that event. In November, it was reported that the British government had contracted with consulting company Equiniti to develop a system for compensating fishermen for losses they should suffer in the event of no deal.

==== Legal challenges ====
EU fishermen may avoid those effects if they are encouraged by their governments to continue to fish in British waters even if told they are not permitted to do so in the absence of an agreement with the UK. They may even do so on their own initiative, out of economic need. "No one knows what's going to happen," a French captain on the Channel told Bloomberg News in February 2019, when a no-deal Brexit seemed imminent the following month. "All we know is that the fish don't care about the border and there's not enough space on the French side." A month earlier French agriculture minister Didier Guillaume had promised that no-deal would not change things. "There is no circumstance in which ... Boris Johnson could prevent French fishermen from fishing in British waters."

While UNCLOS emphasises the importance of international agreements in allocating fishing rights, it also allows nations to stake claims to others' fisheries on the basis of "custom and practice", which French and Dutch fishermen have cited as existing for them long before the EU was even founded. They would also be able to justify fishing in UK waters on the grounds that there is a surplus of fish there, since the British fleet could not harvest, nor the British public consume, most of the catch from British waters, by themselves. The dispute could possibly be taken to the international Law of the Sea court in Hamburg.

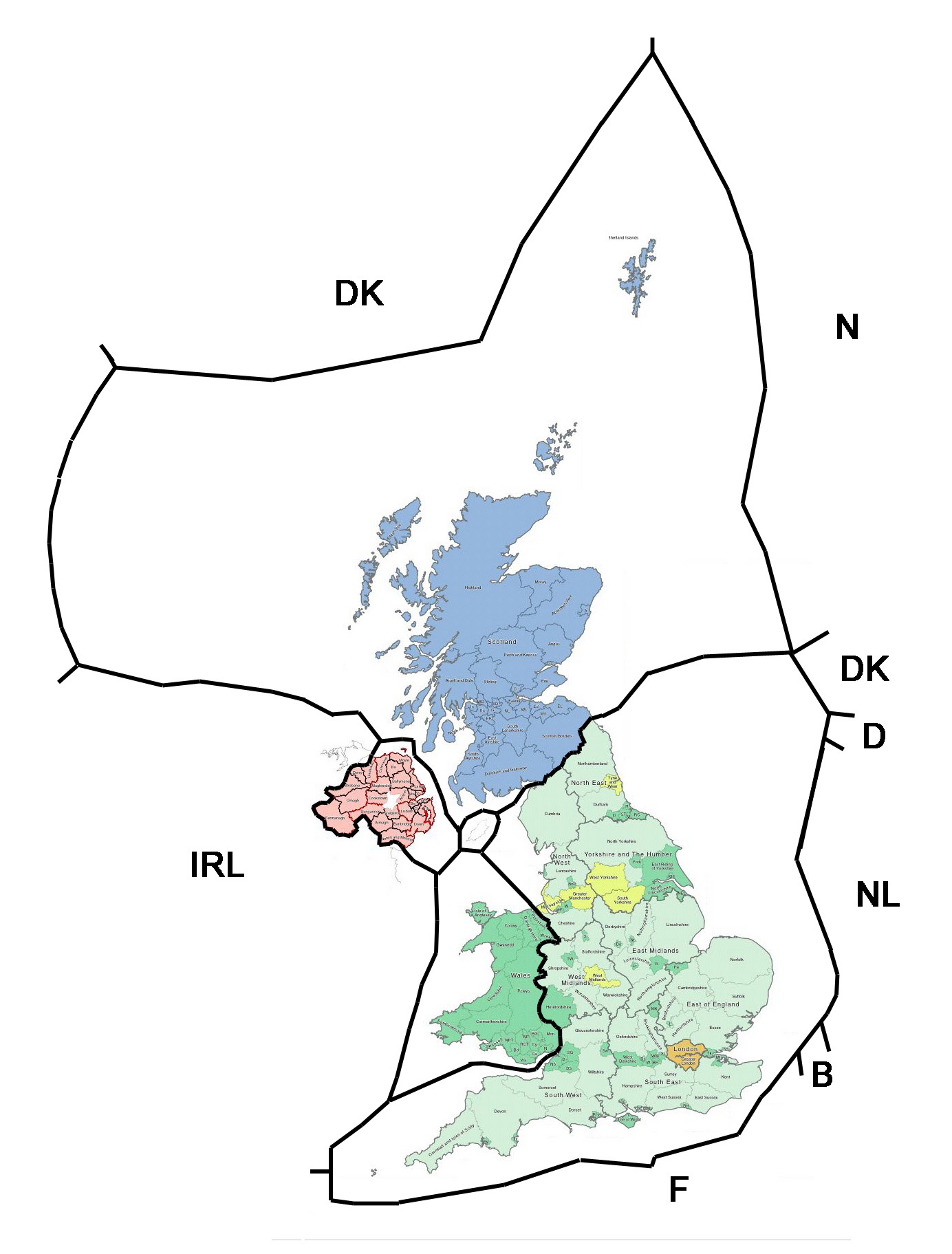
UK EEZ boundaries, with bordering countries indicated

Before the Brexit vote, in 2016, former UK fisheries minister Ben Bradshaw had warned that political resistance to any closure of British waters was to be expected. "The idea that if we voted to leave the EU, our neighbours Ireland, the Netherlands, Belgium, Germany, France and others would simply fall over and allow us to impose a 200-mile limit is for the birds.", he said in response to Eustice having argued that it could be done. By the next year Danish fishermen were preparing a legal challenge to any post-Brexit exclusion from British waters along historical lines, arguing that they have been allowed to fish uninterrupted there since the 15th century. Anders Samuelsen, then Denmark's foreign minister, said that many small communities along the west coast of Jutland were economically dependent on the country's fishing fleet having continued access to the UK's EEZ, from which it takes 40 per cent of its annual catch. "The British claim of getting back your waters is nonsense, because you never had them", said Niels Wachmann, head of the Danish fishermen's association. "Maybe for oil or gas but not for fish." University of Hull law professor Richard Barnes agrees, writing that UNCLOS only grants states stewardship, not outright ownership, of their EEZs, and thus some form of shared fisheries management, including access to each other's waters, will be likely.

In a published opinion for the SFF, Robin Churchill. emeritus professor of international law at Dundee Law School, does not think arguments for historical fishing rights to any surplus catch in the UK EEZ by EU states based on the CFP would prevail. (Note: In late 2020, Willem van de Voorde, Belgian ambassador to the EU, suggested that the Fisheries Privilege, under which British King Charles II granted 50 fishermen from Bruges eternal fishing rights in British waters as a gesture of thanks for the city's hospitality to him while he was in exile there during the mid-17th century, justified Belgium's continued right to fish in UK waters.) To demonstrate that those rights exist, the states claiming them must demonstrate that the state in whose waters they claim the rights formally acquiesced in the past to those rights. The UK itself never acquiesced as a state, he argues, rather the EU imposed the policies on its member states who had no authority to opt out, so the CFP could not have created historic fishing rights for the other EU states.

Nor does Churchill think the EU could claim those rights under UNCLOS on the basis of landlocked or "geographically disadvantaged" states among its membership. None of the landlocked EU member states are near the continent's northwestern coast, and all of the states on that coasts have EEZs of their own and thus cannot be considered disadvantaged. He likens such a claim on the EU's part to the hypothetical scenario of the US claiming a similar right to any surplus from Canada's EEZ on the grounds that some US states close to Canada are landlocked. Lastly, he rejects any argument that the EU is dependent on the UK's EEZ to feed its population since its own data, from 2016, show that it imports 55 per cent of the seafood it consumes from non-member states, (Note: As with many averages, this figure belies considerable disparity among species of seafood. While the EU catches almost three-quarters of the pelagic fish it consumes, and half the molluscs, it imports over three-quarters of its crustaceans.) and seafood only accounts for, on average, 7 per cent of protein consumed in the EU.

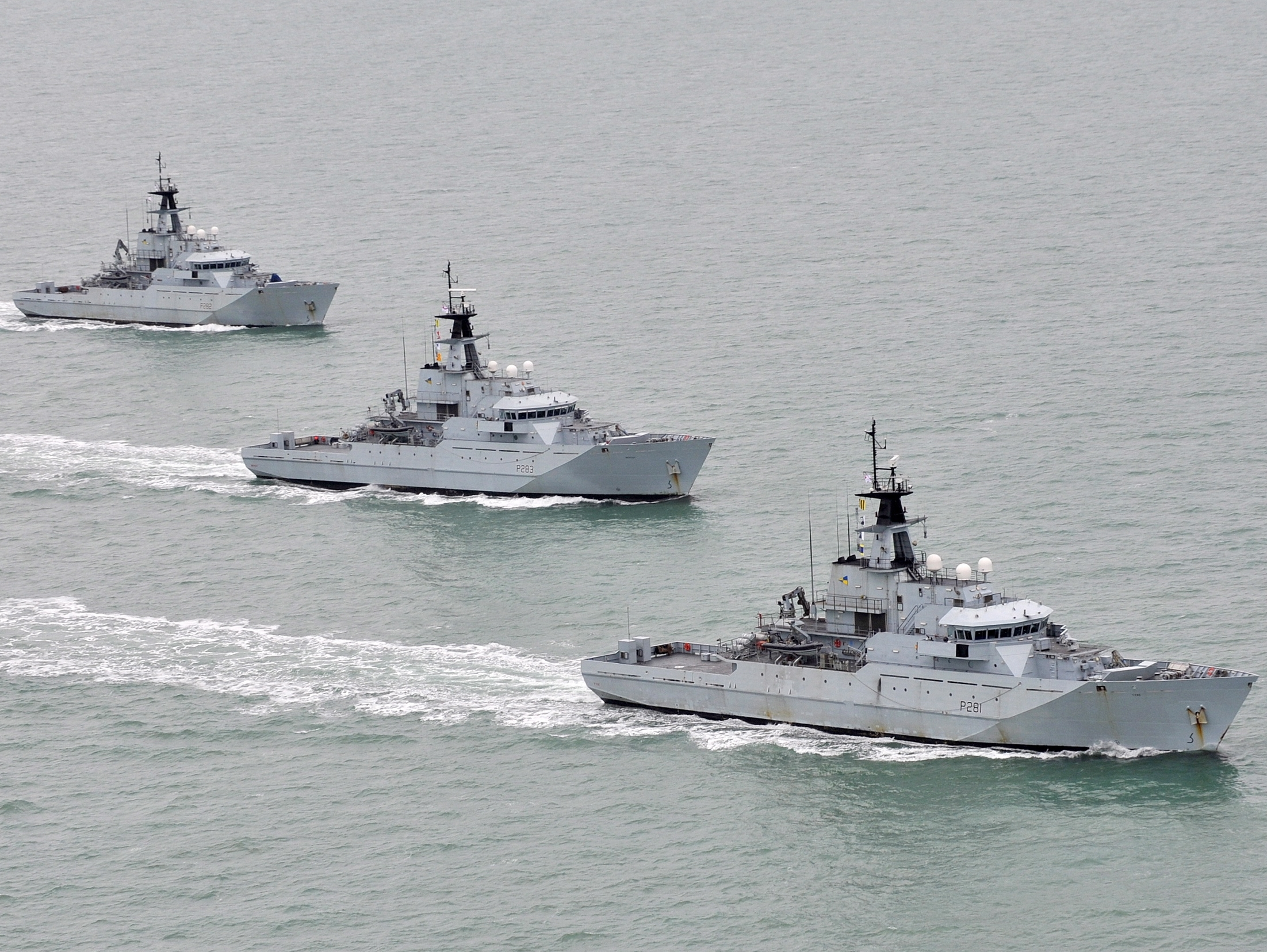
Ships from the Royal Navy's Fishery Protection Squadron during a training exercise in 2012

The UK would thus have to physically prevent foreign boats from entering its EEZ, at 282,808 square miles (732,470 km^{2}) three times the country's land area, if it means to keep its word to take back control of its fishing waters as an independent coastal state. In order to do so, nine ships were added to the Royal Navy's Fishery Protection Squadron (FPS) in 2019, with an additional four joining them the following May. Two surveillance aircraft, and 35 additional enforcement officers, are also part of the package, and 22 more ships are on standby. The goal is to triple the squadron's size before its services may be needed.

In mid-December 2020, the UK had four of the vessels on standby to protect its waters. The Royal Navy has always routinely enforced both UK and European fishing laws throughout the year. Tobias Ellwood, chair of the Defence Select Committee in the Commons, disagreed with any potential threat of increased use of the navy, saying "We're just facing the prospect of ... our overstretched Royal Navy squaring up to a close NATO ally over fishing vessel rights,". "Our adversaries must be really enjoying this." While the vessels are armed, they would not be expected to fire on EU fishing boats; in extreme cases, if one refused to leave British waters, the naval vessels would run alongside and board them, then take the confiscated ship to the nearest British port. Chris Parry, a former admiral and MMO chair, advocated for doing just that to set an example. "Once you had impounded them, the others would not be so keen to transgress without insurance."

In May 2021, the government dispatched two River-class FPS vessels, HMS Severn and HMS Tamar, to Jersey in advance of a planned blockade by French fishermen in protest over new UK fishing regulations.

==== Illegal fishing and overfishing ====
The Navy may not be able to stop all EU attempts to fish British waters, and between that and the failure of the UK to pass a new law regulating its fisheries after the end of the transition period, the environmental group Oceana fears "anarchy at sea". In the absence of an agreement, neither the UK nor the EU will be able to access the others' vessel monitoring system (VMS) data, a weakness unscrupulous fishermen could easily exploit. The illegal, unreported and unregulated fishing (IUU) that would result, Oceana says, will likely lead to overfishing.

Researchers at the University of Strathclyde warn that overfishing resulting from a failure to reach an agreement could seriously deplete prized fish stocks, which had rebounded under the CFP, within a few years. They ran mathematical models of two scenarios, one in which both the UK and EU increase their quotas in British waters, and another in which EU boats are barred from UK waters entirely. The former held a high risk of cod and herring falling to unsustainable levels within five years; in the latter less so, although stocks would decline. Seabird and whale populations would also decline due to food shortages. Researchers at the New Economics Foundation (NEF) similarly found that during periods such as the Mackerel Wars when at least one state party to a joint international fishing agreement in the Northeast Atlantic had unilaterally raised quotas after negotiations broke down, catches of the affected species quickly rose to levels far above those scientifically determined to be sustainable and remained there for several years.

==== Violence and civil unrest ====
"Anarchy at sea" might not be limited to the IUU Oceana fears. The 2018 flare-up of the "Scallop War" between English and French fishermen in the Channel suggests that fishermen are willing to take direct action and use force against their foreign competitors if they do not believe their governments are willing or able to enforce the law. Stéphane Pinto, head of the Hauts-de-France fishermen's committee, who takes three-quarters of his catch from British waters, warned in October 2020 of violence at sea if no deal is reached by the end of the year. "They can't just click their fingers and say we can't fish in British waters any more."

Some Irish shellfishermen believe violence has already occurred. After the 29 March 2019 deadline initially set for Brexit passed, they returned to an inshore area off the Scottish coast, where as a neighbouring nation they had the right to fish (Note: A 2013 annex to the CFP requires that member states make sections of these waters, 6–12 miles from shore, be made available to neighbouring states. A total of 31 such areas have been agreed between the UK and Belgium, France, Germany, Ireland and the Netherlands; some come with limitations to certain species. British ships reciprocally enjoy access to five inshore areas off all those countries except Belgium.) under the CFP that they otherwise would not. They found that 400 of their crab pots had already been harvested, and the eye, through which crabs enter and are trapped, cut from the rest, rendering them useless. Michael Cavanagh, president of the Killybegs Fishermen's Organisation, believes clashes after any closure of UK waters to EU fishermen could result in fatalities. If the UK bars EU boats from its EEZ, observers on both sides expect that clashes will occur on land as well. Spokesmen for French fishing organisations have threatened blockades of British-landed fish. (Note: The economic effect of doing so would be considerable. More than 90 per cent of all the fish processed in Boulogne are landed in the UK and taken by lorries to Boulogne, where 5,000 workers produce 400,000 tonnes (390,000 LT) each year for distribution to the European market. Scottish salmon farmers and processors ship 300 orders a day into Europe overland via France; they fear a supply disruption will be quickly exploited by competitors in Ireland, Norway, the Faeroes and Canada) French president Emmanuel Macron, who has been accused by the British of putting his political future ahead of agreeing a trade deal with the UK, has reportedly warned the leaders of the other EU nations of the likelihood of protests in this circumstance, NFFO head Deas is resigned to the certainty of protests. "French fishermen have done it for much less" he told The Guardian in February 2020. "I would imagine there will be disruption."

Spokesmen for Deas's Irish counterparts agreed that French fishermen were likely to start blockading ports rapidly if the UK closed off its side of the Channel to them. If that situation were to persist, such protests could spread up the North Sea coast to Rotterdam. Of great concern to them was that most Irish fishermen ship their catch overland through the UK to France, and they feared that angry French, Belgian and Dutch fishermen might not distinguish between British and Irish shippers. Were that to happen, Irish fishermen would likely take to blocking their country's ports to British fish as well. "And there will be no point having a blockade in Killybegs" said Cavanagh. "It will be in Dublin because this is about bread and butter."

In June 2021 one hundred Irish trawlers from all over the country sailed up the River Liffey into Dublin, joined by a thousand protesters in the street, all marching on the Dáil's temporary quarters at the Convention Centre, angry over the loss of 15 per cent, or roughly €43 million, of Ireland's fishing quota to the UK under the deal, twice as large a share of quota relative to the national catch as France conceded. The loss of quota to the UK was particularly acute in mackerel, where Ireland's share will go down by a quarter, and in prawns, with a 14 per cent reduction. The fishermen's anger at their government and the EU were exacerbated by a new rule from the latter that their catch must henceforth be weighed at the pier rather than processing plants, meaning that they will have to re-ice the fish afterwards, an additional expense.

In April 2021, French fishermen, angry about a British requirement that they submit GPS data demonstrating that they had been fishing in British waters regularly between 2012 and 2016 in order to be granted a licence to do so after Brexit, began blockading shipments of fish caught in British waters landed in Boulogne-sur-Mer, where only 22 of 120 local boats had been issued licences. "You want to keep your waters?" their signs asked. "Then keep your fish!" The head of the local fishing cooperative said his members had expected the licences to be granted within days of their applications back in January. The EU approved a €100 million outlay by the French government to compensate fishing boats and fishmongers delayed by the implementation of new British rules.

===== Jersey dispute =====
Early in May, after a four-month grace period during which French fishermen could fish Jersey under the EU rules ended, those fishermen claimed the new permits Jersey was issuing after they had proved they had historically fished there came with restrictions on the days they could fish and the equipment they could use that would make it unprofitable for them to fish there. Annick Girardin, France's Minister of the Sea, called this "completely unacceptable" and said the country's government should consider switching off the island's electricity, most of which is generated in France. Her colleague Clément Beaune, Secretary of State for European Affairs, has also threatened to obstruct efforts by British banks and financial companies to do business in the EU over the fishing impasse; British officials later claimed that their French counterparts had successfully pressured the EU to link fishing and finance.

"The anger is roaring and the desire to do battle is palpable," among affected fishermen, said French Assemblyman Bertrand Sorre, who represents the department of Manche in coastal Normandy near Jersey. A blockade of the island by a hundred French fishing boats was planned for 6 May. While its organiser said the fishermen would not actually try to prevent landings at the port of St. Helier, the British government has dispatched River-class patrol vessels HMS Severn and HMS Tamar to Jersey. French vessels were also sent to the island's waters; ultimately about 60 French trawlers showed up and made noise and shot off flares. Jersey's fishermen said that French fishermen were still preventing them from unloading their catches at Granville and other French ports where they have long done so.

In the wake of the showdown, commentators disparaged the idea that fish for finance could work for either sector, much less Britain . "Neither sector benefits from the inherently antagonistic relationship that Brexit has baked into the politics around it" observed Financial Times columnist Helen Thomas. It was possible the distrust between the two sides on financial matters could fade with time, she allowed, but "[t]he collection of French fishing boats, Royal Navy ships and French military vessels in the waters off Jersey tells you how likely that is ever to be the case in fishing." Nick Collier, the City of London Corporation's managing director, said it was "too late" for a fish for finance deal to be reached.

==== Possible benefits to UK ====
In October 2016, four months after Brexit referendum, then-Secretary of State for Environment, Food and Rural Affairs George Eustice told The Telegraph that British fishermen would be able to catch more fish, an amount the newspaper characterised as "hundreds of thousands of tonnes", after Brexit, through the balancing of quotas considered unfair to the UK. an amount later described as a "bonanza". Pressed on this at a House of Commons hearing on the status of Brexit five months later by Neil Parish, chair of the Environment, Food and Rural Affairs Select Committee, whose Tiverton and Honiton constituency in Devonshire has many of those fishermen, Eustice declined to commit to the certainty of more fish for British fishermen. "We have not started the negotiations yet", he said.

The NEF's report doubts that British fishermen would, individually, reap much benefit from a sudden surfeit of salable fish resulting from any exclusion of EU boats. EU law, which the UK will no longer be subject to, caps the total size of the bloc's overall fishing fleet in order to maintain sustainability. The dynamics of supply and demand, the NEF models suggest, would soon result in more British boats fishing UK waters, assuming EU boats were effectively prevented from fishing them, thereby reducing catches.

Madsen Pirie of the Adam Smith Institute notes that the UK has some environmental protections for its fishery that currently cannot be extended to the entire EEZ due to the CFP. Pair trawling, a practice whereby two boats drag the same ultrawide net behind them as they pursue parallel courses some distance apart, has been widely criticised by environmentalists and some fishermen for killing dolphins and porpoises. The UK has banned the practice but that can currently only be enforced within its 12-mile limit; it continues in the rest of the EEZ. Likewise, Pirie observes that the EU's ban on discards of unsalable fish caught at sea was only enacted after France and Spain lobbied for exemptions that in his opinion greatly weaken it.

=== Relocations of financial assets and staff ===
In August 2020 Valdis Dombrovskis, then the European Commissioner for Financial Stability, Financial Services and the Capital Markets Union, warned UK companies that it was unlikely an equivalence finding would be made before the end of the year and that until one was reached the UK would have to negotiate access to capital markets with the EU's individual member states. Early the next month, as EU-UK negotiations appeared to be stalling, Financial News found that most of the city's major financial companies had not fully prepared for the consequences of a no-deal final Brexit due to the disruptions caused by the pandemic. Many of the 138 companies surveyed told the newspaper they still had "significant" issues to resolve in the four months left to them.

Companies had hoped originally that the issues involved in any EU-UK agreement on financial services would remain largely technical, leaving the existing relationship intact. Three-quarters of the companies told the News they did not expect any deal made by the end of the year to include their industry. Former LSE head Xavier Rolet cautioned businesses against any last-minute bargain. "Business should not be surprised if the EU's final position privileges the political interests of its most influential Member Nations over any short-term economic self-harm, whether real or perceived," he said.

In anticipation of the possibility of no deal and the complications it would cause to serving the EU from London, banks and other financial services companies began moving at least some of their operations to cities within the bloc. In November 2018, as the original March 2019 deadline loomed, a lobbying group in Frankfurt estimated that 37 City-based companies had moved £800 billion worth of assets under management to the German city; by March that estimate had been revised upward to £900 billion (and that amount was believed to be a "significant underestimate") along with 5,000 jobs, as the German government began the process of easing labour laws which had been seen as an obstacle to attracting those jobs. Elsewhere in Europe, Dublin was a particular favourite, with Luxembourg and Paris also witnessing some relocations.

Assets banks had publicly announced they were shifting to the EU had reached £1.2 trillion by October 2020, equivalent to 14 per cent of all those owned by British-based banks. Barclays moved £150 billion, over 10 per cent of its domestic British assets, to Ireland. JPMorgan Chase similarly moved €200 billion in assets, 7 per cent of its global total, to Germany, and indicated up to a quarter of its total wholesale revenue currently produced in the UK could move elsewhere. True totals could be even higher due to transfers that remain undisclosed. Stephen Jones, head of UK Finance, the industry trade group, told a House of Lords committee that the shifted assets could cost the government £3–5 billion in taxes.

Staff relocations slowed in 2020 due to the pandemic, but the plans remain. According to Germany's Federal Financial Supervisory Authority (BaFin), most banks had by June completed most of their legal and technical preparations for no deal, but had only relocated a third of their business. European banks in some cases simply merged their British and EU operations to make it easier to relocate staff. American banks like Goldman Sachs, Bank of America and JPMorgan Chase have leased space in Paris, since ESMA is now headquartered there; already those have moved 1,500 jobs out of a projected 7,000 total out of the UK; Credit Suisse has shown some interest in Madrid—in July 2020 it applied to Spanish and EU regulators for a licence to upgrade its current brokerage in the city to a full-service investment banking hub after the UK leaves the EU completely. It had already moved 50 jobs there.

By October 2020 Ernst & Young (EY) estimated 7,500 jobs had moved, amounting to 4 per cent of the city's total. The true number may be higher, since the company only tracks job moves at the largest 222 firms. EY notes the same companies are expanding their EU operations with 2,800 new positions, and others are waiting to see how the trade talks turn out before making any decisions on moving staff. One estimate suggests that eventually only 80 per cent of major Wall Street banks' European staff will be based in London, as opposed to 90 percent beforehand.

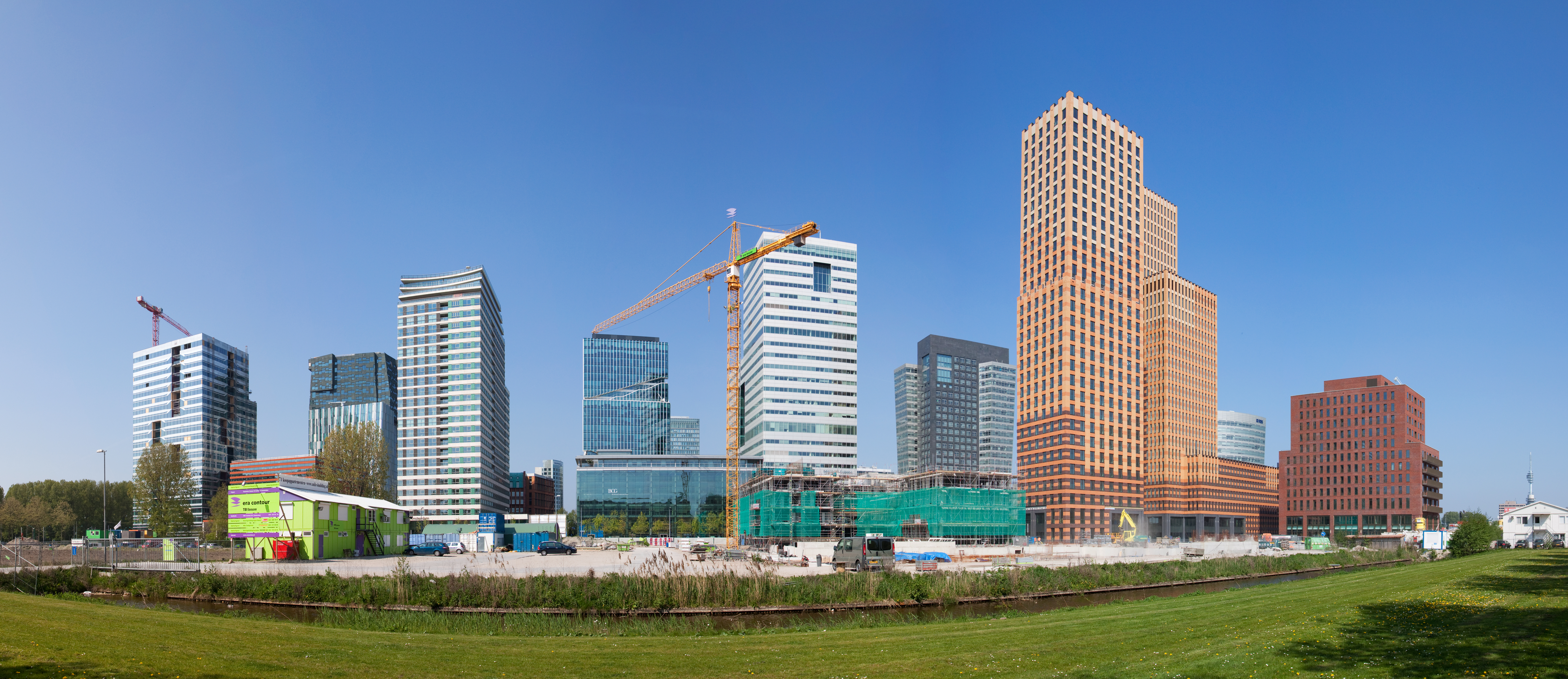
Amsterdam's Zuidas district, a destination for many companies relocating from the UK

"[I]n tiny, orderly Amsterdam, it is already possible to glimpse what post-Brexit Europe might look like—because it is already here", Fortune wrote in November 2019. "About 100 companies with operations in the UK have opened offices in the Netherlands because of Brexit, according to the Netherlands Foreign Investment Agency." AM Best, the American insurance rating company, has moved its EU headquarters to the Dutch capital, which unlike its other EU rivals has not made any great effort to entice companies to move there, and has laws less favourable to high-paid financial workers than those rivals. Many companies are locating in the city's growing new business district, Zuidas.

London still has advantages, particularly the "almost cultural attachment", in one observer's words, that many foreign investors have to it, the English language and legal system (still the basis for many financial contracts) and the expertise of the many professionals there. "If you want to see 20 investors who are genuinely invested in your area, London is still the place, and we don't see that changing", says the head of Frog Capital, a venture capital firm that invests in fintech and green finance. "Never underestimate the financial sector's ability to do the business it wants, where it wants, despite regulators putting lines on maps" one central banker told The Economist.

Nor do any of the EU rivals offer the range of excellence in all financial subsectors that London does, since they compete with each other as well as London—Frankfurt specialises in banking, Amsterdam in trading platforms, and Dublin and Luxembourg in fund administration. Paris is the closest to London in having that range, but it still could improve considerably; a recent survey of world financial centres ranked it 18th, just ahead of Washington, D.C. French regulators are also still seen as intrinsically hostile to the financial industry, despite the city's recent efforts to attract more of that business.

On 4 January 2021, the first trading day after the UK fully withdrew from the EU, analysts calculated that 45 per cent less stock was traded in London than had at the end of the previous year. This was attributed to Euro-denominated shares no longer being permitted to trade on the British exchange due to a lack of equivalence. It was estimated that a total of €6.3 billion in shares was traded that day in the EU that might otherwise have traded in London.

All the shares traded on the pan-European exchange Aquis moved from London to Paris that week as well. The company head called it a "spectacular own goal" for the UK. One unnamed financial industry leader complained to The Independent that "we've sacrificed financial services for a bunch of fish." The following month it was reported that Amsterdam's exchanges had surpassed London as Europe's largest Euronext trading centre during January, with a daily average of €9.2 billion in shares traded on Euronext Amsterdam and the Dutch arms of Turquoise and CBOE Europe, as opposed to €8.6 billion in London, due to the EU's decision to not yet grant equivalence. Paris and Dublin also saw small increases.

In mid-March securities for 50 Irish companies that trade on the Euronext Dublin were transferred from the CREST central securities depository in London to Euroclear Bank in Brussels. This amounted to another €100 billion in assets leaving the UK for the EU since Brexit. Ireland, alone among EU countries, does not have its own securities depository and had instead relied on the UK's, since most Irish companies also listed their stock in London.

As the pandemic began to ease in Europe, banks and financial firms picked up the pace of relocations from London to the EU, and said there was likely still more to come. Despite original expectations that most of those jobs would end up in Frankfurt, Paris had actually gained the most by that point, with Morgan Stanley, Bank of America and JPMorgan making the largest moves to the French capital; bankers were said to find its lifestyle, proximity to London and a more business-friendly attitude from President Emmanuel Macron's government attractive. Milan, too, had landed some banking business, with Goldman Sachs tripling its 2017 staff there, including its head of European corporate and sovereign derivatives. Barclays is also running its mergers and acquisitions for Europe and the Middle East from Milan.

In late 2022, the European Commission announced plans to introduce new regulations requiring financial firms doing business in the EU to clear a portion of their "systemic" derivatives in EU-based clearing houses. The exact percentage would be determined by ESMA within a year of the law's adoption. This has been seen as indicating it was less likely that the EU would extend the equivalence it temporarily granted UK markets after Brexit beyond its current expiration date of 2025.

"London used to be the largest financial centre of the European Union and everybody liked it," said Euronext CEO Stéphane Boujnah. "Today, [it's] the largest financial centre of the United Kingdom". He noted that Ryanair had recently chosen to list in Dublin only instead of the LSE as well, and Universal Music Group chose to list in Amsterdam, bypassing London entirely. An EU official told The Guardian that the regulatory proposal had less to do with Brexit and more with the desire for the bloc to be less dependent on outside providers, a lesson it had learned from the effects of the recent Russo-Ukrainian War.

In 2024, Michael Mainelli, Lord Mayor of the City of London, told Reuters that by the City's calculations Brexit had cost it 40,000 jobs, a quarter of which went to Dublin. That estimate was far greater than any previous one. Mainelli allowed that there were more total jobs in the City than at the time of the Brexit vote due to the economy expanding into data analysis and insurance, as well as other sectors beyond finance. The City's total financial output had fallen by 15 per cent since Britain formally left the EU in late 2019, part of the sector's 1 percent drop nationwide, while financial output grew in France, Germany and Ireland over the same period. Calling Brexit a "disaster", Mainelli said he had made nine trips to continental Europe on the City's behalf and called on the Labour government elected earlier that year to do more to help, particularly with visa policy.

== See also ==
- Glossary of Brexit terms
