= Fish farming in South Australia =

Fish farming is a major economic contributor to South Australia's seafood sector. The most valuable species is the Southern bluefin tuna, which is caught in the wild then transferred into sea cages in southern Spencer Gulf where they are fed locally caught sardines. The second most valuable species is the Yellowtail kingfish, which is farmed near Port Lincoln and Arno Bay. A tourist venture called Oceanic Victor located in Encounter Bay allows paying customers the opportunity to swim in a sea cage with the Southern bluefin tuna and handfeed the fish. Prominent companies in the fish farming sector in South Australia include Clean Seas and Tony's Tuna International.

== Economics ==
The highest value fish in South Australia's seafood sector, and its major export earner, is the Southern bluefin tuna. Market competition for South Australian tuna comes from fish farms in the Mediterranean. The primary market for Southern bluefin tuna is Japan and smaller markets exist in South Korea and China.

As of 2021, Australia's annual tuna catch quota is held by seven companies. Listed in order of largest quota held to smallest, they are: Australian Fishing Enterprises (established by Sam Sarin), Tony's Tuna International, Australian Tuna Fisheries (part of The Stehr Group, established by Hagen Stehr), Marnikol Fisheries, Sekol Farmed Tuna, Blaslov Fishing Group and Dinko Tuna Farmers.

== History ==
Sea cage fish farming in South Australia began at an experimental scale in the early 1990s. Since that time, South Australia has developed legislation and regulations for the industry. An Aquaculture Advisory Council composed of various industry, government and external stakeholders was formed to inform the process. Aquaculture zones for prescribed use have been established across the state's waters. Companies apply to the South Australian government to lease an area of water within these zones to grow certain permitted species. Some of the zones are shallow or otherwise unsuitable for fish farming and instead are allocated for Pacific oysters or blue mussels.

Port Lincoln Tuna Processors established a cannery in Port Lincoln in 1973 to serve the wild-caught fishery. In 2001, the shore-based tuna canning industry was Port Lincoln's largest user of potable water, and discharged its wastes to the waters of Proper Bay. Working with South Australia's EPA, Port Lincoln Tuna Processors was able to reduce its water use significantly. The cannery ceased processing tuna in 2010, when John West took their production contracts offshore. In 2021, the company was facing the prospect of reducing its workforce dramatically due to a lack of contracts for the processing of other products. In addition to canning, the factory is capable of packing products in a range of soft pouches. In the 1980s, when tuna was more plentiful, there were five tuna canneries operating around Australia.

Various accounts of kingfish escaping from sea cages, some releasing tens of thousands of fish, led to the eventual establishment of a public register by PIRSA, the industry regulator. There were 35,000 confirmed escapes between 2001 and 2003 alone. In several instances, damage was suspected to have been caused by boats, including on one occasion, a State government-operated boat.

Kingston Council encouraged PIRSA to permit sea cages closer to shore in 2004.

In 2006, three new aquaculture zones became available for finfish farming in Lacepede Bay. Another three were created by new regulations designating zones in Anxious Bay, on the west coast of Eyre Peninsula, Port Neill on the Spencer Gulf, and at Rivoli Bay in the state's south-east.

In 2006, Adelaide hosted the Australasian Aquaculture Conference.

Between 2008 and 2011, tuna baron and kingfish farmer Hagen Stehr expressed his view that desalination brine from a proposed desalination plant would have widespread impacts on fish farming, wild fisheries and the giant Australian cuttlefish aggregation. He also warned of a huge compensation claim should the water quality be impacted by mining-related activities. His concerns were shared by other aquaculture and commercial fishing interests and supported by research by oceanographer, Jochen Kaempf.

In 2011, a new 10,000 hectare zone for fish farming was proposed off Tumby Bay in southern Spencer Gulf.

In 2011, conservations rejected the proposition of establishing a "Swim with the Tuna" tourist attraction on Kangaroo Island's north coast. The proposal was later relocated to Encounter Bay, where it was established within a Habitat Protection Zone of the Encounter Marine Park. The attraction currently operates there under the name Oceanic Victor.

In 2012, Clean Seas yellowtail kingfish leases were abandoned after elevated fish mortalities from 2009 to 2011. The fish were suffering from a form of gut enteritis and secondary infections.

In 2013, an additional 7500 hectares of lease area was made available for the farming of southern bluefin tuna, mussels and abalone south of Port Lincoln. Farms in the new lease area would benefit from deeper water and better flushing conditions than those closer inshore.

In 2016, SARDI announced that they had developed a new feeding regime for yellowtail kingfish farmers that would help them maintain animal health during the winter to mitigate potential stock and financial losses.

In the late 2010s, aquaculture quotas in South Australia were being leased to long-line Southern bluefin tuna fishers on Australia's east coast as that activity was proving more profitable than ranching.

In the summer of 2020-2021, the tuna fleet had difficulty catching their quota.

== Criticism ==
Former Greens MLC Mark Parnell raised concerns that the industry and the way aquaculture zones were being managed was effectively privatising the coastline. He also warned of the threat of the spread of seacages and pollution of the seabed if the industry was allowed to grow without constraint.

Vocal critics of the scale and frequency of Yellowtail kingfish escapes, including Allan Suter, called for a ban on kingfish farming entirely in 2003.

An attempt to establish finfish farming at Wool Bay in GUlf St Vincent was rejected by SARFAC, the South Australian Recreational Fishing Council on grounds that the location was inappropriate. The farm was not established.

In 2005, conservationists raised concerns about the growing prospect of the aquaculture industry taking precedence over the establishment of state managed marine parks and the conservation of threatened species. The Conservation Council of South Australia called for a moratorium on new aquaculture developments, but was unsuccessful. The Wilderness Society also supported the moratorium call after marine debris from an abalone farm was distributed along 170 km of coastline following a storm.

In 2006, two casually-employed fish farm workers from Whyalla were told to go home by their employer SAAMS after participating in a protected industrial action.

Since the early 2000s, occasional escapes of yellowtail kingfish have occurred. These are often reported by fishermen before the growers, and can number in the tens of thousands per event. On one occasion, fish farmers suspected an act of sabotage resulted in the release of 10,000 kingfish.

Fish farm nutrient pollution has impacted Louth Bay in southern Spencer Gulf, where it led to seagrass loss and algal blooms in the mid 2000s. Residents argued that the bay, which is semi-enclosed by Louth Island and Rabbit Island is a slow flushing system unsuitable for fish farming.

In 2008, some recreational anglers expressed their disapproval of the industry, noting escapes of farmed fish, marine debris and the loss of amenity.

In the 2010s, two proposals to establish a "Swim with the tuna" attraction outside Port Lincoln were made. A proposal for the north coast of Kangaroo Island did not proceed. It was opposed by conservationists. A similar proposal followed in 2015. Locals to the Encounter Bay region, most notably surfers, opposed the establishment of a tourist attraction based on Port Lincoln's "Swim with the Tuna" venture. A court challenge was mounted but was unsuccessful. The business is now operating near Granite Island as Oceanic Victor.

The use of wild caught fish can impact the wider ecosystem by prey depletion. South Australian biotechnologist Andrew Ward has researched ways to mimic natural systems to derive feedstock from waste streams from other animal industries that could reduce or eliminate the need for wild caught fish in farmed fish feed.

Marine debris is another form of pollution stemming from fish farming operations. While this cannot be mitigated entirely, operators engage with local communities with coast care projects and beach clean-ups as a means of offsetting their environmental impact. A Fitzgerald Bay resident described the smell of dead fish and marine debris as major disappointments of the industry's activity in upper Spencer Gulf between the late 1990s and 2012.
