= Fitzgerald Bay =

- Becky's Bay
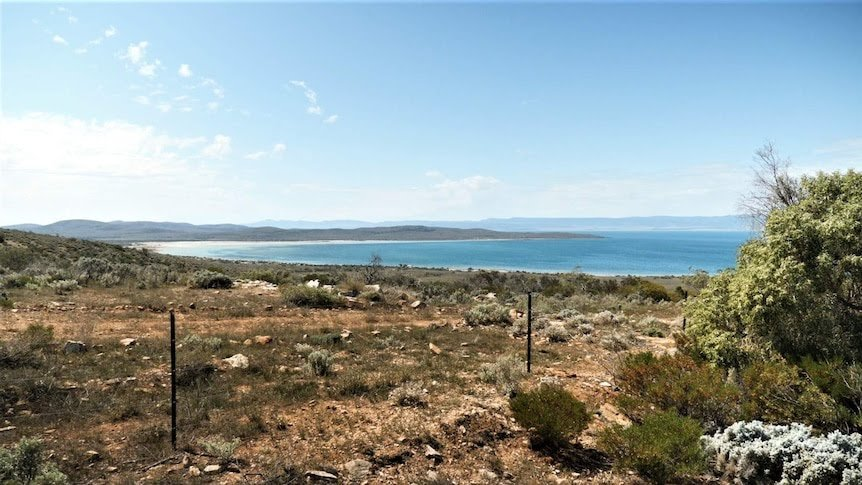
- Fitzgerald Bay and proposed aquaculture site 2021

- Location in South Australia
- Location: Spencer Gulf, South Australia
- Coordinates: 32°56′10″S 137°46′25″E
- Type: Bay
- Basin countries: Australia

Fitzgerald Bay is a large bay located between Point Lowly and Backy Point in South Australia's upper Spencer Gulf. The bay's shoreline consists mostly of pebble beaches and sparse grey mangroves. In the 2000s the bay was used for the farming of yellowtail kingfish until their closure circa 2011 in response to high levels of fish mortality. Understanding of the environmental impacts of yellowtail kingfish farming is limited. As of 2021, fish farming has not returned to Fitzgerald Bay, but aquaculture zones remain in place, and Clean Seas is authorised to restock fish farms there. There are approximately forty shacks and coastal homes sparsely distributed along the fringe of Fitzgerald Bay whose interests are represented by the Cultana Jenkins Shackowners' Association.

== History ==
Fitzgerald Bay is home to an outstanding geological feature; a section of stranded shingle beach ridges that date back to the late Pleistocene period. The feature received South Australian state heritage listing in the early 2010s after nomination by the Cultana Jenkins Shackowners Association. The feature is marked by interpretive signs and is protected from disturbance by four-wheel drive vehicles.

From the mid-19th century, the bay was known by the informal European name, Backy's Bay or Becky's Bay. According to Port Augusta residents, it was first named by Mr J. McCarthy (father of Alf McCarthy) who was Port Augusta's first pilot and harbormaster. "Becky" was a nickname derived from Rebecca, the first name of McCarthy senior's wife. Pilot McCarthy died at 73 years of age in March 1899. He had lived and worked in the Port Augusta area for forty years.

In the early 1910s, it was considered prospective for the development of a deep sea port for the shipment of iron ore minded by the Broken Hill Propriety at Iron Knob. New railway infrastructure that citizens argued should be state owned would have been required for a new port to have been constructed there. The port did not proceed, with the location's main disadvantages being the lack of any nearby settlement and absence of water supply. Iron ore shipment facilities were instead constructed by BHP at Whyalla, which was then known as Hummock Hill.

In 1937, Backy Bay was officially named Fitzgerald Bay after a former South Australian parliamentarian and member for Port Pirie, John Christopher Fitzgerald who believed that a prosperous future for the upper Spencer Gulf could be built on the back of iron ore mining.

=== Early industrial proposals (1930s-1950s) ===
Between 1937 and 1939 the site was considered for a prospective naval shipbuilding yard. One of the site's disadvantages was a lack of power supply and Whyalla was chosen instead. In 1952, Fitzgerald Bay was chosen as a prospective site for the first nuclear power plant in the Southern hemisphere, and discussion of the prospect continued until 1954. The proposal was never formalised, though uranium-bearing ore was mined in South Australia at Radium Hill and refined at Port Pirie during the 1950s and early 1960s. Then Premier Thomas Playford described the bay as "very well protected and (it) has deep water close in shore. It would be close to transmission lines and it appeared to me to have every qualification necessary for the site of such a plant."

=== Fish farming (1990s-2000s) ===
Fish farming in Fitzgerald Bay began in the late 1990s at pilot scale with yellowtail kingfish, Seriola lalandi. Carrying capacity of the aquaculture zone was estimated to be between 496 tonnes and 5096 tonnes for worst and best case scenarios respectively. The carrying capacities were designed to ensure compliance with national water quality guidelines, as set out by ANZECC in 1992.

Production increased over the next decade, then de-stocking occurred between 2009 and 2011. The bay's aquaculture ventures has been totally abandoned by 2012. In 2017, Clean Seas was aiming to restart their operations in Fitzgerald Bay and increase their production quota to 4200 tonnes from their prior quota of 2400 tonnes. While operational, fish farming became the upper Spencer Gulf's largest nutrient pollution source, and the only direct nutrient pollution source in Fitzgerald Bay. Lesser nutrient pollution sources in the upper Spencer Gulf are (from largest to smallest): the Whyalla Steelworks, the region's wastewater treatment plants and the lead smelter at Port Pirie all of which discharge their pollution outside of Fitzgerald Bay.

=== Resumption of fish farming (2021) ===
In 2021, Clean Seas Seafood received all the necessary approvals to resume fish farming within Fitzgerald Bay. The return of the activity had raised concerns about nutrient pollution loading impacting the bay's ecology and the nearby giant Australian cuttlefish aggregation. Some of the City of Whyalla's elected members remained opposed to the project, over 600 people signed a petition opposing the project, and 85 local businesses signed an open letter opposing it.

== Giant Australian cuttlefish ==
The northern Spencer Gulf population of Australian giant cuttlefish (Sepia apama) forms dense breeding aggregations in the Upper Spencer Gulf. Aggregations occur within Fitzgerald Bay at the northern end (Backy Point) and the southern end (to the north and south of the Point Lowly North Marina). The largest breeding aggregations occur outside of Fitzgerald Bay to the southwest of Point Lowly.
