= Hagen Stehr =

Australian businessman

Hagen Stehr AO (born 1941) is an Australian multi-millionaire businessman, tuna fisherman and founder of the Stehr Group.

== Career ==
Stehr lives in Port Lincoln, South Australia where he manages his business interests in fishing and aquaculture, most notably Southern bluefin tuna (Thunnus maccoyii) fishing and offshore ranching in Spencer Gulf for export markets. The Stehr Group also propagates and grows Australian Yellowtail Kingfish (Seriola lalandi) and Australian Mulloway (Argyrosomus hololepidotus) through its aquaculture division, Clean Seas Seafood.

One of the wealthiest men in South Australia, Stehr is also the founder and chairman of the Australian Maritime and Fishing Academy. The Stehr Group has a commercial fleet of nine vessels.

Stehr is sometimes referred to colloquially as a "tuna baron" or "tuna king", a term representative of the profitability of the business. He has previously boasted that when he sits down with his friends Sime "Sam" Sarin, Mario Valcic and Joe Puglisi, they are worth more than a billion dollars between them. According to the BRW Australian rich list, his personal wealth was approximately $US135 million in 2009 after peaking the previous year at AUD$271 million. In 2015, Stehr's business Clean Seas Tuna Limited was ranked number 88 in InDaily's Top 100 SA Businesses, with an annual revenue of $20,133,000. Stehr's son Marcus is the managing director of Clean Seas. In November 2016, shareholders of Clean Seas voted to change the company's name to Clean Seas Seafood Limited. Stehr's business interests are represented in the South Australian parliament by political lobbyists and former politicians, Graham Ingerson and Nick Bolkus.

Hagen Stehr was awarded Officer of the Order of Australia on Australia Day, 1997. He received the award for service to the commercial fishing industry and to education and training, particularly through the South Australian Fishing and Seafood Industry Skills Centre Inc. He also received the Centenary Medal for services to the community in 2000. Stehr was awarded an Honorary Doctorate of the University of the Sunshine Coast in 2010, and was included in the "three wise men" ceremony together with diplomat Richard Woolcott and Deputy Chancellor of the university, Tim Fairfax. He was named Seafood Icon, South Australia in 2009 and initiated into the National Seafood Hall of Fame in 2013.

In 2014, Stehr participated in a trade delegation to China with Australia's Prime Minister, Tony Abbott as an ambassador for the seafood industry.

In 2016, Stehr began supplying southern bluefin tuna to Darwin for sale at the Darwin Fish Market.

Stehr has appeared in the 60 Minutes episode Drovers of the Deep (2004), his business was the subject of the documentary film Tuna Wranglers (2007) and his attempt to close the life-cycle of the Southern bluefin tuna featured in the documentary Sushi - The Global Catch (2012).

=== Research and development ===
Hagen Stehr through his company Clean Seas Tuna has invested in attempts to close the life cycle of the Southern blue-fin tuna by propagating them in a land-based tank. The tank's waters were climatically controlled to simulate the experience of wild fish traversing long distances and varied oceanic conditions. The mature fish required for the research were air-lifted to the facility from grow-out pens at sea by helicopter. The research was conducted in partnership with Kinki University, Japan and over the first four and a half years, $4.5 million was raised through government bodies. The Fisheries Research & Development Corporation (FRDC) and the Government of South Australia's Department of Trade & Economic Development (now the Department of State Development) were among them.

In Bangkok, 2008 Hagen was presented with the Friend of the Sea, Sustainable Seafood Award in acknowledgement of being the first organisation in the world to create an artificial breeding regime for the Southern bluefin tuna. Time magazine rated this milestone as the second best invention of 2009. In developing this technology, Stehr established the first formal collaboration agreement between Kindai University of Japan and Australia for the propagation of tuna.

=== Tuna tourism ===
In 1996, Stehr briefly considered establishing a tuna farm in Encounter Bay as a tourist attraction to cater for Japanese tourists. A similar proposal was put forward by in 2015 by another Port Lincoln tuna baron, Tony Santic. Stehr's daughter, Yasmin, spoke representing the 2015 applicant, Oceanic Victor, at a meeting of the Development Assessment Commission (DAC). The following day, Oceanic Victor's proposal received DAC approval. Stehr's daughter Yasmin had previously worked in the tuna industry, flying spotter planes used to locate wild tuna schools so that they can be caught and fattened up in sea cages before export.

== Early life ==
Stehr left home at the age of 12 to join the merchant marines, then jumped from job to job working on cargo ships. He absconded at Port Lincoln at the age of 18, where he met his wife Anna and became a tuna fisherman in 1961. He arrived in Port Lincoln with little money and no employment prospects. He is also a former member of the French Foreign Legion.

== Memberships ==
For 24 years Hagen Stehr served as the inaugural chairman of the South Australian Seafood Industry Skills Centre. In 2005 the organisation was replaced by the Primary Industries Skills Council where he remains a board member. He is currently the Ambassador of Indigenous Employment Projects and food ambassador appointed by the South Australian Government in 2013. He is also a member of the South Australian Government's Aquaculture Advisory Committee.

Stehr was the seed funder of a sculpture of a "tuna poler" fisherman made by Ken Martin that was unveiled in Port Lincoln in July 2019. Project funds were managed by the Axel Stenross Maritime Museum.

== Political views ==
Hagen Stehr is a champion for the Fishing and Aquaculture Industry and defender of Fishing and Maritime rights. He is a prolific writer and writes a monthly opinion column called "Stehring the Kaiser" for Ausmarine magazine. Stehr has stated that his tuna business is "beholden to Japan" and has welcomed the prospect of a Free Trade Agreement with China and reduced tariffs. He believes accessing markets in China and Korea will be instrumental to the future success of his business. He believes that seafood from Eyre peninsula and Port Lincoln comes from "without doubt the cleanest waters" and is harvested sustainably. Stehr has frequently expressed his views to the media in response to a range of fisheries, aquaculture and marine conservation matters.

=== Iron ore export from Port Lincoln ===
In June 2008 Stehr attended a protest opposing Centrex Metals plan to export iron ore from Port Lincoln. Over 400 people and a flotilla of 50 boats representing the seafood industry were also in attendance. The following year, Stehr voiced his opposition, stating that he was concerned about the new activity harming the town's reputation for producing clean, fresh seafood.

=== Western Australian shark cull ===
Stehr has publicly supported the culling of protected Great white sharks during the controversial Western Australian shark cull in 2014. He had previously complained to the media about "shark attacks and tuna disappearing" saying that his company "fought against White pointers."

=== Super-trawler FV Margiris ===
In 2012, Stehr spoke out against the approval of the super-trawler FV Margiris to fish in Australian waters, saying "The Australian government is the only one stupid enough to take it... Those ding-a-lings from AFMA (Australian Fisheries Management Authority) in Canberra shouldn't let a ship like that in. It wasn't welcome anywhere else."

=== Marine Parks Sanctuary Zones ===
Stehr has disputed claims that losses to the fishing industry through the creation of 'no take' marine park sanctuary zones in South Australia will be outweighed by ecotourism, following the publication of a report by the Conservation Council of South Australia. Stehr has said of his town, Port Lincoln, that "People don't come down here for ecotourism, they come for fishing." He believes that the establishment of 'no take' sanctuary zones on 1 October 2014 will significantly affect the industry's output and could force Australia to import more seafood. On 18 September 2014, Stehr called on Premier Jay Weatherill to "not destroy an industry. It is wrong and I'm standing up against it."

== Personal life ==
Hagen Stehr is married to Australian-born Anna (of Greek heritage, née Mareolas) and has two children: Marcus and Yasmin. Yasmin donated a kidney to her mother, ending her dependency on dialysis. Stehr drives a Jeep as a mark of respect for General George S. Patton, whose military strategy he admires.
