= Tony Šantić =

Croatian-Australian thoroughbred owner and tuna farmer (born 1952)

Tony Šantić (born 17 October 1952) is a noted Croatian Australian thoroughbred owner and Southern bluefin tuna farmer.

== Career ==
Born in Lastovo, Croatia, Šantić grew up in Port Lincoln. He gained initial success in tuna fishing there, and his early exploits in the fishing industry also included fishing for orange roughy in a leaky boat called the Vigorous off the coast of Tasmania. He went on to establish "Tony's Tuna International" in 1994.

In the early 1990s, Šantić suffered financial hardship after tuna quotas were reduced twice. The tuna industry and a number of related businesses suffered while others shut down entirely. Santic's business survived, and by 1996 it had grown to include tuna ranching operations in Mexico, the Mediterranean and Port Lincoln. The development of ranching turned the tuna industry around, and Tony's Tuna International became one of the three largest tuna ranching operations in Port Lincoln.

In 1997, Šantić decided to pursue his interest in horse racing, which ultimately led to three Melbourne Cup victories courtesy of a horse he named Makybe Diva. Šantić featured in the BRW Rich List in 2003, with an estimated personal wealth of $200 million. Fellow Port Lincoln tuna ranchers Sam Sarin and Hagen Stehr also featured on the list.

By 2005, Šantić's horse Makybe Diva had won back-to-back Melbourne Cup races, and according to Robert Skeffington, editor of the BRW Rich List, Šantić was worth $150 million.

In January 2010, an ammonia cylinder exploded at Šantić's tuna processing facility, destroying a shed and releasing ammonia gas into the atmosphere. No-one was injured during the explosion and Šantić was out fishing at the time of the event. Safework SA announced that they would investigate the incident.

In 2012, Šantić's company, "Tony's Tuna International", initiated plans to trial an alternative ranching regime involving the capture of younger, smaller fish, and extending ranching time from six to 18 months. The initiative planned to make better use of the quota system, which allocates a total allowable catch to license holders, measured in tonnes. Later that year, Šantić and his wife Deslee became victims of fraud. The Adelaide newspaper The Advertiser was informed that $700,000 had been siphoned out of their business interests and that a 33-year-old Torquay man was under police investigation. As of 2015, Šantić remains the CEO of "Tony's Tuna International".

=== Oceanic Victor Pty Ltd ===
In 2015, South Australian Environment minister Ian Hunter revealed that Šantić was a director of Oceanic Victor Pty Ltd. With fellow director Michael "Mick" Dyer (who is also Šantić's Tuna International's Operations Manager) and long-term friend and advisor Emma Forster, the company intended to offer offshore marine tourism opportunities for visitors to the Victor Harbor area. The company proposed to use the kiosk at Granite Island as a departure point, from which tourists would be taken by boat to an offshore facility where they would be able to feed and swim with fish, and watch them from and underwater observatory. The attraction opened to the public in 2017.

== Personal life ==
Šantić came to Australia with his family in 1958, aged six. His parents lived in Geelong, Victoria, for the next eight years, after which Tony and his mother moved to Port Lincoln, South Australia.

In 1996, about nine years after the death from Hodgkin's disease of his first wife, Sonya, Šantić married Christine, his family's former cleaning lady. The couple shared three Melbourne Cup victories together with their racehorse, Makybe Diva.

In 2006 Šantić and his wife separated, with the divorce being finalised in 2008, involving the carve-up of his $200 million business. On 25 April 2009, he married his third wife, Deslee Kennedy, who had been his media manager.

Šantić has three children, Emily Šantić, born to his first wife, Sonya, Joseph Šantić, born on 8 March 1989 to his second wife, Christine, and Charli Rose, born in October 2009 to his third wife. He was also stepfather to Christine's children, Leith, Adam and Bianca, from her first marriage.
