= John Ellice-Flint =

John Ellice-Flint is an Australian businessman, petroleum geologist, and executive director of Blue Energy.

== Career ==
Ellice-Flint managed global exploration for US petroleum house Unocal (since merged with Chevron) prior to his appointment as managing director of Australian oil and gas company Santos Limited in 2000. He then lead Santos' establishment of a coal seam gas portfolio in Queensland, Australia which underpinned Santos' development of a liquefied natural gas plant on Curtis Island near Gladstone. Ellice-Flint believes that gas offers a safer alternative to coal or nuclear power generation with respect to reducing the impacts of climate change. Ellice-Flint left Santos in 2008 having assisted its growth by more than $4 billion in value. He remained a shareholder in the company, and continued to show support for unconventional gas developments. He joined coal seam gas exploration company Blue Energy as an executive director in 2012 after a four-year absence from the oil gas industry. Ellice-Flint is also a former director of South Australian aquaculture company Clean Seas Tuna, which fishes and ranches southern bluefin tuna and yellowtail kingfish for export sale.

== Memberships ==
Ellice-Flint is a former member of the Council of the Australian Petroleum Production and Exploration Association. He was also the chair of the board of the South Australian Museum from 2002 until 2011.

== Education ==
Ellice-Flint holds a Bachelor of Science (Geology) degree with Honours from University of New England.
