= Emma Forster =

Australian TV presenter (born 1976)

- Born: 1976 (age 49–50)
- Occupations: Television presenter, director

Emma Forster (born 1975) is a South Australian television presenter, director of tourist attraction Swim with the Tuna and advisor for the company, Oceanic Victor. She lives in Port Lincoln where she has developed several properties. She has worked as a presenter on the seafood, fishing and boating television program Out of the Blue, is a friend and business advisor to multi-millionaire tuna rancher Tony Santic and is a former girlfriend of retired South Australian treasurer, Kevin Foley.

In 2013, Forster was co-managing her family's business, Calypso Star Charters and her partner was abalone diver David "Bucky" Buckland. In 2014, Forster served as Secretary for the Port Lincoln Chamber of Commerce and Tourism. Forster is a fisher, and holds longstanding national and South Australian women's and junior records for an eagle ray she caught in Spencer Gulf in 1987 on 10 kg line. The fish weighed 68.5 kilograms and was caught off Thistle Island.

== Career ==
=== Swim with the Tuna ===
Forster is a director of Port Lincoln-based tourism venture, Swim with the Tuna. Operations were first trialled in South Australia's Boston Bay in 2010 before commencing commercial operations in 2011. The business intended to move to Kangaroo Island, but has faced opposition from conservationists and residents. Proposals to relocated the facility comprising a modified tuna pen and floating pontoon to Nepean Bay have been rejected on two occasions, most recently in 2012. Oceanic Victor (another business for which Forster works as an advisor) proposes to offer a very similar experience to that offered by Swim with the Tuna, located off Granite Island in Encounter Bay. The Swim with the Tuna business was sold in 2015 ahead of the possible relocation to Victor Harbor. Forster claimed that they had held some of their fish captive for five years, the largest having reached a weight of 85 kilograms.

=== Granite Island observatory ===
Emma's father Ron Forster built a floating underwater observatory in 1989. Her father's construction was first used in Port Lincoln, where it assisted the development of the tuna industry. It was later sold to Stephen Edwards, who moored it off Granite Island. It operated there as a tourist attraction and educational facility from 1997 to 2004. In 2015, Forster was revealed to be working as an advisor for Oceanic Victor, a company which intends to re-establish a similar facility off Granite Island. The venture intends to offer people the opportunity to swim with Southern bluefin tuna and other marine species, feed fish and observe them underwater. The two directors of Oceanic Victor are also the CEO and Operations Manager of Tony's Tuna International, Tony Šantić and Michael "Mick" Dyer. Tony Šantić is a long-term friend of Forster's who provided her with a character reference after she was charged after crashing her Mercedes and recording a blood-alcohol level of 0.224% in August 2006. She returned to the road in March 2007 with a provisional driver's license.

=== Great white sharks ===
Forster has co-managed her father's business, Calypso Star Charters, which offers shark cage diving experiences to tourists. Forster's partner David "Bucky" Buckland has encountered many great white sharks while diving for abalone. In 2013 Forster said of Great white sharks:

"The sharks are like rabbits now. They can breed and no one can catch them."

== Early life ==
Forster grew up on Fleurieu Peninsula, where she attended Rapid Bay Primary School and Yankalilla Area School. She undertook a Rotary Youth Exchange to Japan in 1993, at the age of 17.

In September 2020 Emma was named as one of the 10 Most Powerful People in Port Lincoln.

Emma and David share a daughter Zoe who was born in 2015.

== Ron Forster OAM (father) ==
Emma Forster's father Ron Forster is fisherman, land developer and charter business owner. With Rolf Czabayski, Forster founded the Port Lincoln Tuna Classic fishing competition, originally known as "The Shootout" in 2005. In 2006 he purchased Calypso Star Charters. The company offers tourists shark cage diving with Great white sharks and swimming with Australian sea-lions out of Port Lincoln. In 2007, Forster set a Game Fishing Association of Australia record for the largest samson fish caught by a male fisherman. The fish weighed 25 kilograms and as of 2015 the record remains unbroken. He is a member of the Game Fishing Club of South Australia and owns a boat called Long Shot.

Circa 2007, Forster began planning a major residential and holiday land development project called Sleaford Cove. The proposal covers 200 hectares overlooking Sleaford Bay and comprises approximately 350 housing allotments and 50 holiday units. In 2013 community concerns were raised regarding the Sleaford Cove project's potential environmental impacts. In 2014 Ron Forster was awarded at the South Australian tourism awards for "outstanding achievement by an individual". As of 2015, Ron Forster is involved in the sale of land at Point Boston. Forster was involved in the development of the Lincoln Cove marina in the 1990s. Forster's land development company Sea Marine Holdings Pty. Ltd. was established in 1992. His wife Janet Forster is a fellow director and company secretary.

In 2019, Ron was awarded an Order of Australia medal for his contribution to the fishing & tourism sectors.
