= Clean Seas Seafood =

Australian seafood company

Clean Seas Seafood Ltd is an Australian seafood company, specialising in aquaculture of the yellowtail kingfish (Seriola lalandi).

Clean Seas was formed by the Stehr Group in 2000 and was publicly listed on the Australian Stock Exchange in 2005.

The company’s initial purpose was to propagate and grow southern bluefin tuna (Thunnus maccoyii), as well as other species including yellowtail kingfish. Today, Clean Seas focuses its efforts solely on the sustainable, closed cycle production of yellowtail kingfish.

Clean Seas is recognised for innovative aquaculture practices and reliability in supplying the highest quality fresh fish to markets all over the world, 52 weeks a year. Their operational footprint is on the Eyre Peninsula, South Australia, which includes a hatchery in Arno Bay and multiple farm sites off Port Lincoln in the Spencer Gulf. The head office and processing facility are based in Royal Park, Adelaide.

Fed by the currents from the Southern Ocean, the Spencer Gulf has some of the purest water in the world. Yellowtail kingfish are indigenous to the Spencer Gulf. Unique in Australia, the Spencer Gulf has no rivers feeding into it, and no farmland surrounding it. Therefore, the Kingfish are able to be raised in pristine, peaceful surroundings until they are ready for harvest.

Clean Seas products are certified as sustainable by the Aquaculture Stewardship Council. Spencer Gulf Kingfish from South Australia is the main brand that Clean Seas use throughout the foodservice industry. However, more recently they have launched a newer brand, South Australian Yellowtail Kingfish, which is targeted at home cooks.

Clean Seas works with its network of distributors, wholesalers, chefs, restaurants and retailers to develop long-term relationships in markets across the world.

The unique Spencer Gulf location, environmental conditions and significant aquaculture experience allows Clean Seas to produce a premium quality kingfish.

== History ==
Australian Tuna Fisheries Pty Ltd was founded by Hagen Stehr and registered in 1963. In the year 2000 it was renamed The Stehr Group and established Clean Seas.

The company successfully controlled the life-cycle of the Yellowtail kingfish and invested substantial research and development effort in trying to achieve the same for the Southern bluefin tuna from 2005 onwards. The company suffered unsustainable stock losses of its Yellowtail kingfish between 2009 and 2011 after which the company suspended its Southern bluefin tuna breeding project in 2012. The company has posted significant annual losses in many financial years, and has had its social licence challenged by recreational fishers and Spencer Gulf residents due to its handling of kingfish escapes, garbage, pollution and shared use facilities, including the Point Lowly North marina. Conversely, the company has won various awards and accreditations that acknowledge their product and market development achievements and its founder has an Order of Australia Medal and is a member of the Australian Seafood Hall of Fame.

Yumbah Aquaculture Purchase

In July 2025, Clean Seas Seafood Limited was acquired by Australian shellfish producer Yumbah Aquaculture and was subsequently delisted from the ASX.

Yumbah Aquaculture is South Australian-headquartered and paid nearly $30 million for Clean Seas.

Yumbah said at the time that adding kingfish to its abalone, oyster and mussel portfolio would provide further resilience against the inherent risks of aquaculture through diversification.

At the same time Yumbah Aquaculture became the first oyster producer in Australia to attain Best Aquaculture Practices (BAP) certification, an internationally recognised benchmark for responsible aquaculture.

BAP certification provides independent assurance that Yumbah’s oyster farming operations meet the highest global standards, reinforcing the company’s dedication to quality, sustainability, and continuous improvement across all aspects of aquaculture.

In April 2025 Yumbah was awarded the Aquaculture Stewardship Council’s coveted Responsible Seafood Producer award for its regenerative approach and engagement with local communities and First Nations stakeholders.

=== Southern bluefin tuna ===
In 2005, Clean Seas was awarded an AUD $4 million grant from the Australian Government to develop a system for the land-based production of young Southern bluefin tuna. Clean Seas Tuna Ltd was floated on the ASX that year, with the ambition of controlling the lifecycle of the Southern bluefin tuna. In March 2007, the company announced it has successfully stimulated the release of sperm in a captive Southern bluefin tuna and captured it on video. Further developments were announced in 2008, with Stehr stating that the development "will give us a sustainable blue fin industry, that nobody around the world will be able to attack us in the future." Clean Seas announced that they had closed the lifecycle of the Southern bluefin tuna after successfully producing eggs from captive mature fish. They airlifted mature fish into their land-based facility at Arno Bay in May for breeding purposes. By mid-2009, the company had raised young Southern bluefin tuna to roughly 20 cm long, and members of the Norwegian aquaculture sector were expressing interest in their progress.

In March 2010, the Australian Securities and Investments Commission investigated Clean Seas for failing to disclose the deaths of Southern bluefin tuna fingerlings to the market. The company said that the fingerlings were not of material value and that the breeding program was ongoing. The company's efforts appeared in the documentary film Sushi - The Global Catch. Research and development was eventually discontinued as the company had difficulty raising the larvae which have complex water temperature requirements, eat each other and injure themselves in captivity. The company officially suspended its Southern bluefin tuna propagation research as a cost-cutting measure after it revealed it had made a $34 million statutory loss for the last half of 2012. In February 2013, Stehr remained optimistic about Clean Seas' future prospects for closing the life-cycle of the Southern bluefin tuna.

=== Yellowtail kingfish development ===
In 2006, Clean Seas struck a deal to export Yellowtail kingfish to Russia. The following year, a deal to stock Yellowtail kingfish in Sainsbury's supermarkets in the United Kingdom was finalised. The company was optimistic that it could achieve spawning of Southern bluefin tuna the following year. The company was also attempting to accelerate the Yellowtail kingfish's growth by artificially increasing water temperature for fish held in tanks at Arno Bay.

In 2008, Stehr told the ABC that he had expansion plans for the company. He said "We got the marina [in] close proximity to Adelaide, and it is a natural progression for our company to move that side... We either move to Wallaroo or direct to Adelaide."

In 2009, the company employed 90 people in Whyalla, according to its CEO. At that time it was using the Whyalla marina but had plans to develop a marina for dedicated use in Fitzgerald Bay.

=== Financial losses and fish mortalities ===
The company reported a $12 million loss in 2009, having lost feed and equipment during a fire. Hagen Stehr, the founder of Clean Seas, stepped down from his position as Chairman of Clean Seas Tuna that year. At the time, he said that the company was transitioning from a research and development company to commercialisation.

In April 2010, Clean Seas announced that it would close its Whyalla kingfish processing facility. In May 2010, the twenty-two people employed there lost their jobs. The company decided to consolidate its processing in Port Lincoln.

In September 2010, Clean Seas staff killed 80 tonnes of stock as a result of human error while "bathing" the fish in hydrogen peroxide at the wrong concentration. The stock had infestations of flukes on their skin and gills that such baths are intended to clear.

The company reported a first-half loss of $14 million that year, and a loss of over $15 million for the year to June 30.

In November 2010, Stehr told The Advertiser that he took responsibility for the over-production of kingfish which adversely impacted the company's finances. At that time, the company's Chairman was John Ellice-Flint, and its Managing Director was Clifford Ashby.

In late 2011, the ongoing fish mortalities raised concerns about water quality. Local Parliamentarian Lyn Breuer stated "I understand there are further issues down the peninsula where there's a bit of a shortage of other species so I think we need to have this looked at." Paul Steere from Clean Seas stated that a cause might be hard to find and "there are a lot of drivers that affect the fish. It's always difficult to isolate a particular cause and effect." ABC reported that Clean Seas was removing its operations to Arno Bay "to let its farming area recover."

In 2011, Clean Seas reported a $9.3 million loss for the latter half of 2010. 2011 also saw kingfish production in Fitzgerald Bay cease after two years of high levels of fish mortality. Clean Seas worked with research scientists to investigate the issue. Clean Seas tried to produce fish on land, but were producing weak fish and suspected a nutritional problem. Clean Seas reported that its farmed kingfish were afflicted with a "mystery illness" gut enteritis and that 38 percent of its stock had been lost in 2012 and 17 percent in 2011. Fish also had secondary health problems and were in a generally weak condition. Clean Seas directed blame for the losses at feed suppliers Ridley Corporation and Skretting Australia, serving both companies legal notice that it would be seeking damages to the value of "tens of millions" of Australian dollars in 2012.

Clean Seas reported a $34 million statutory loss for the second half of 2012. It suspended its tuna propagation efforts in order to focus on kingfish production exclusively. Financial pressure prompted restructuring and the sale of assets. Between January and September, its workforce halved in number.

=== Litigation, recovery and expansion plans ===
In mid 2012, Clean Seas was seeking an investment partner to help the company to expand and reach new markets. Later that year, the company's share price was near its all-time low value of two cents per share, following a series of fish health and mortality problems. Clean Seas workforce was halved to lower operating costs.

In 2013, Clean Seas founder and former Chairman Hagen Stehr was inducted into Australia's Seafood Hall of Fame.

In 2015, Clean Seas announced that it had served proceedings in the Supreme Court of South Australia against former feed supplier, Skretting Australia. Clean Seas alleged that the supplier's product was deficient in taurine which contributed to poor fish health and stock losses between 2009 and 2012. In 2016, Clean Seas estimated the financial losses related to alleged deficiencies in Skretting's product to be valued between AUD$34.5 million and AUD$39.1 million. The long-running legal dispute with Skretting was eventually settled out of court in 2019 with Clean Seas receiving AUD$15 million.

In 2015, Clean Seas was investigating the prospect of establishing fish farms for Yellowtail kingfish and Yellowfin tuna near the Abrolhos Islands in Western Australia and Yellowtail kingfish at Wallaroo in South Australia. At that time, the company's objective was to be able to grow and sell 3,000 tonnes of Hiramasa per year. Late 2015 saw the company appoint David Head as CEO, whose terms included some equity in the company. In 2016, Clean Seas Tuna Ltd became Clean Seas Seafood Ltd, with the company refocusing entirely on Yellowtail kingfish. In 2017, it rebranded its product Spencer Gulf Hiramasa Kingfish and established new facilities at Royal Park, South Australia. As of September 2017, Hagen Stehr remains the company's largest shareholder, which he holds through the entity: Australian Tuna Fisheries.

In 2018, Clean Seas' directors were confident about the prospects for their Yellowtail kingfish business, and planned to resume farming in Fitzgerald Bay, near Whyalla in August of that year. In November 2018, Clean Seas signed a distribution agreement with Chinese seafood distributor, Hunchun Haiyun Trading Co Ltd. That year, the company received $2.5 million from the Australian Government in a program to support employment initiatives in regional areas. This supported Clean Seas' efforts to reestablish itself at Fitzgerald Bay in the upper Spencer Gulf region.

In 2020, Clean Seas entered a partnership with Norwegian company Hofseth with the objective of selling frozen kingfish into the US market.

In May 2021 Clean Seas halted trading on the ASX briefly, pending their secondary listing on the Oslo-based Euronext Growth Exchange in Norway. The listing is expected to occur in late May 2021.

As of May 2021, Clean Seas has not resumed kingfish farming in Fitzgerald Bay in South Australia though it has the required approvals to do so. The last approval to be granted was for the commercial use of the Point Lowly North marina. Councillors of the City of Whyalla felt that their "hand was forced" by the Government of South Australia on the matter, and some of them remain opposed to the project.

== Awards, accreditation and associations ==
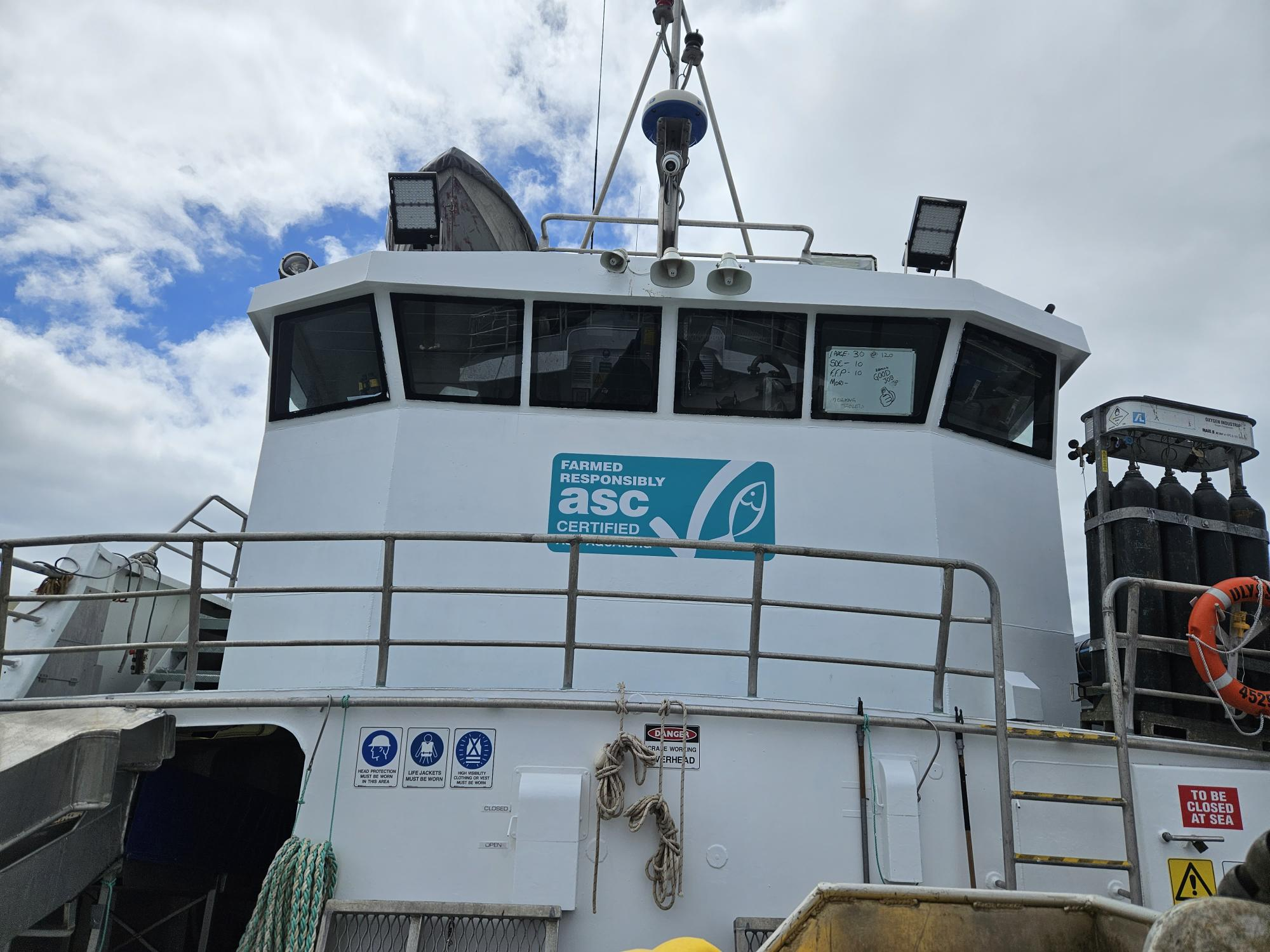
ASC logo on Clean Seas vessel

In 2014, Clean Seas Yellowtail kingfish operations were accredited as "sustainable" by Friend of the Sea. Clean Seas won a national gold medal in the 2018 delicious Produce Awards' "from the sea" category. In 2019, Clean Seas won two SA Food and Beverage Awards in "Business Excellence" and "Export" categories. It was also recognised by Business SA as South Australia's Exporter of the Year. It sold approximately 2,700 tonnes of kingfish that year, with around 45 per cent of that exported. Europe was the largest export market at that time. Clean Seas works with high profile chefs and restaurants in the marketing of their product, including chefs Giovanni Pilu, Shaun Presland, Donovan Cook, Frank Shek and Nicky Reimer and restaurants such as Bennelong and China Doll in Sydney, The Atlantic in Melbourne, Zuma in London and Nobu in Milan.

Clean Seas production is the only Ocean Raised Seriola certified by the Aquaculture Stewardship Council (ASC), which is the world’s leading certification scheme for farmed seafood – known as aquaculture – and the ASC label only appears on food from farms that have been independently assessed and certified as being environmentally and socially responsible. ASC certification code: ASC-C-02593. ASC standards are strict requirements for responsible seafood farming that encourage producers to farm with care for fish, the environment and the people on and around the farm. Certified farms must actively minimise their impact on the surrounding natural environment. They must also operate in a socially responsible manner, care for their employees and work with the local community.

== Incidents ==
In 2001, up to 200,000 kingfish escaped from sea cages at Clean Seas' Arno Bay leases. The event was not reported, and the potential harm was dismissed by the South Australian government. Clean Seas threatened to take legal action against its net manufacturer.

In 2003, the company was investigated for the potential unauthorised clearing of native vegetation near their Arno Bay facilities. The company also experienced kingfish escapes that it suspected may have resulted from someone tampering with a sea cage. The South Australian Aquaculture Council defended the fish farmers, suggesting that recreational fishers should acknowledge their own impact on wild fish stocks. Fishers were concerned that escaped kingfish were persisting in South Australian waters and causing environmental damage.

In 2004, fishermen near Tumby Bay reported catching kingfish that behaved like, and were the size of farmed fish. No escapes had been reported at that time.

Clean Seas suffered additional kingfish escapes in 2005, but only officially reported the loss after recreational fishermen reported seeing them near Port Augusta.

In 2007, a Clean Seas employee who was intoxicated was directed to free dive to clear dead fish from a sea cage. The man blacked out and had to be resuscitated. The company was fined $26,000 and subsequently implemented random drug and alcohol tests for employees. The employee returned to work, but suffered post-traumatic stress. The matter was resolved in court in 2011. In 2008, the company was forced to remove waste that smelled of dead fish it had dumped at the Point Lowly quarry without authorisation. Residents were also complaining about pellet bags, ropes and rubbish washing ashore from aquaculture operations.

In 2010 then head of stock-broking firm Lonsec, Norman John Graham, was served a notice by ASIC alleging 14 counts of insider trading related to the sale of stock in Clean Seas Tuna. He allegedly sold large volumes of stock for a variety of interests ahead of a public announcement that drove the stock value from and average 23-24.5 cents down to 9.1 cents. The firm had underwritten the floating of the company on the ASX in 2005 and ASIC claimed he was privy to inside information about the company's financial position.

== Political statements ==
Founder and early Chairman Hagen Stehr has been outspoken in voicing opposition to the establishment of marine parks, changes in tuna quotas to conserve the species and proposals by other industrialists to introduce new sources of pollution to Spencer Gulf waters.

In 2009, the Committee for the Conservation of the Southern Bluefin Tuna reduced Australia's Total Allowable Catch by 30 percent, angering company chairman, Hagen Stehr.

In 2008, he opposed a proposal from mining company Centrex Metals to export iron ore from Port Lincoln and the pollution it would generate. He threatened to relocate his business interests from Port Lincoln to Wallaroo, or to Mauritius if the port development went ahead.

In July 2011, Stehr announced his objection to the proposal from BHP Billiton to construct a seawater desalination plant at Point Lowly, south of Fitzgerald Bay. He raised concerns about the brine pollution and its potential to harm his kingfish business and the surrounding ecology. He told the ABC: "The fact of the matter is the village idiot knows that if you've got high salinity it stunts the growth... and if you've got just a fraction of the salinity going up it will impede the ecosystem."

Neither proposal was constructed.

=== Lobbying ===
Clean Seas uses professional lobbyists to represent its interests to the South Australian parliament. These include former parliamentarian Graham Ingerson (since 2016), Coombe Government Relations and others. Graham Ingerson also represents the Australian Maritime Fishing Academy which was founded by Hagen Stehr in 1997.
