= Out of the Blue (2003 TV series) =

Out of the Blue is a South Australian television series which promotes the Australian seafood industry by combining travelogue and cooking show formats. It is presented by fishmonger Michael Angelakis with co-hosts Michael Keelan and Emma Forster. The series first aired in 2003 and the first through fourth series of the program have been released on DVD. Two Out of the Blue recipe books written by the show's two male hosts were published in 2004, and a third followed in 2007.

Over 100 episodes aired on Channel 9 before the program moved to Channel 7 in 2011. During its time on the Seven network it was supported by Australian businessman, Robert Gerard. While the show has primarily focused on South Australia, episodes have also been recorded in Italy, Vietnam and Malaysia.

In 2013, Angelakis attributed the program's longevity to "the people and the products from this state (South Australia)... There is no better salesman of a product than its owner, they have intimate knowledge of their own goods."

As of January 2018, 197 episodes of the series have aired on Australian television.

== Presenters ==
Michael Angelakis is a Greek-born fishmonger who emigrated to Australia in his 20s and worked as a fisherman. Michael Keelan is a career broadcaster and gardener, with culinary knowledge of vegetables, herbs and spices. Emma Forster, a Port Lincoln businesswoman, joined the show during its first season.

Michael Angelakis returned to presenting the show in 2016 after a leave of absence due to ill health.
