= Oceanic Victor =

Travel and holiday companies of Australia

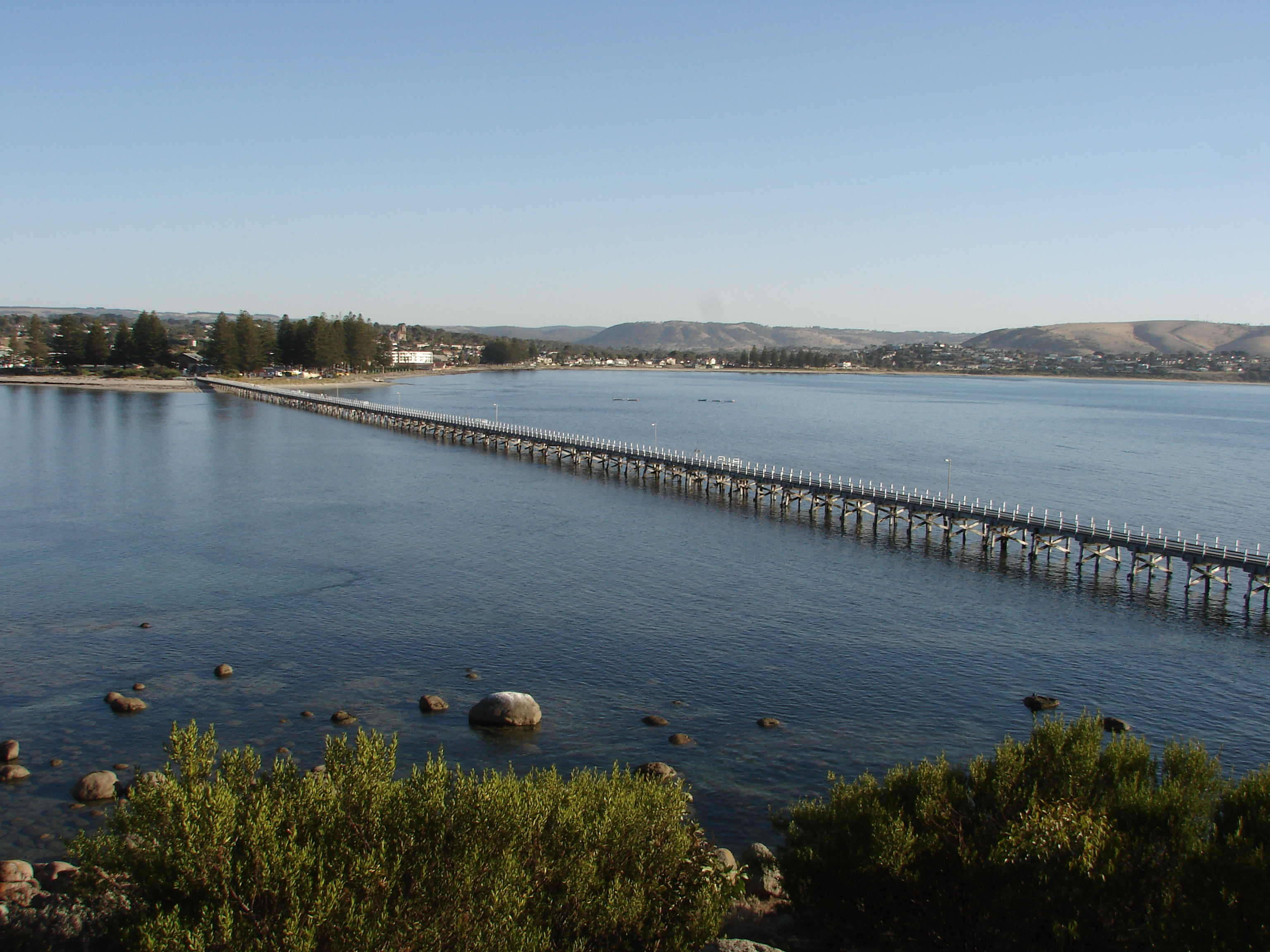
View of Victor Harbor from Granite Island

Oceanic Victor is an Australian privately owned company which runs marine tourism facilities on and adjacent to Granite Island, Encounter Bay, South Australia. The company's main attraction is a floating at-sea aquarium containing Southern bluefin tuna and other marine species. The facility is located within a Habitat Protection Zone of the Encounter Marine Park and opened to the public on 2 September 2017. Since 2019 it has been open intermittently while work has been undertaken on the causeway to Granite Island and owing to COVID-19 restrictions in 2020. As of 2021, the attraction is in Port Lincoln where it is undergoing maintenance. It is expected to reopen in 2022 once work on the causeway is complete.

== Attraction ==
Oceanic Victor's main attraction is a single modified tuna seacage moored to the seabed, which was purchased from Swim with Tuna in 2015. Visitors have the opportunity to swim with and feed southern bluefin tuna, and observe other species via an underwater viewing deck and touch-tank aquaria. At the time of its proposal, the sea cage was to contain up to five tonnes of southern bluefin tuna, and up to 0.5 tonnes combined of other species native to South Australian waters. Tuna were to be fed with South Australian caught pilchards. Visitors to the attraction depart from Granite Island in a catamaran, which then moors at the aquarium, which is a specially-modified commercial tuna ranching pen. Those wishing to swim with the tuna and other fishes are provided with wetsuits, gloves, boots, masks and snorkels and those seeking to remain dry can view the fish from an underwater viewing platform.

Employee David Priess told SA Weekender that Oceanic Victor provides an opportunity "to jump in the water with some local South Australian aquatic species, have a really good time, a great experience... and learn a bit about South Australian aquaculture and fisheries at the same time." The company's website describes its goals as providing "an opportunity to experience and understand our diverse marine environment" while "promoting South Australia’s strengths as a source of clean, green and sustainable quality seafood for the world".

Additional facilities and attractions include a cafe onshore at Granite Island, and nocturnal walking tours of the island's little penguin colony.

As of 2021 the attraction is undergoing maintenance work in Port Lincoln and is scheduled to reopen at Granite Island in 2022.

== Origins ==
In 1996, "tuna baron" Hagen Stehr considered establishing a tuna farm in Encounter Bay as a tourist attraction to cater for Japanese tourists. In 2010, a similar venture was launched in Boston Bay near Port Lincoln, which ran from 2010 to 2015 where it was managed by Emma Forster. In 2011, a proposal was made to establish a similar attraction on Kangaroo Island's north coast, but that plan was met with opposition and did not eventuate.

A similar proposal was made in 2015 by another Port Lincoln tuna baron, Tony Santic, acting as a director of the newly formed company, Oceanic Victor Pty Ltd. The new company's co-director is his business associate, Michael "Mick" Dyer, who is Operations Manager at Santic's commercial tuna farming business, Tony's Tuna International.

During the planning and approval process, the applicant was also represented by Heather Montgomerie, a former State Government employee who held senior positions at Primary Industries and Regions SA (PIRSA) Aquaculture for over a decade. Also representing the applicant was Hagen Stehr's daughter, Yasmin, who has previously worked for her family's commercial tuna and kingfish farming business, Clean Seas.

The infrastructure used by Swim with the Tuna between 2010 and 2015 was purchased by Oceanic Victor. It was intended to be towed to Encounter Bay, near Granite Island, where Oceanic Victor was allocated a pilot aquaculture lease by PIRSA.

Emma Forster was employed as an advisor to Oceanic Victor throughout the planning and approval process. Her father Ron originally constructed the observation deck component of the Oceanic Victor attraction in 1989, after which it was used in waters near Port Lincoln to aid the early development of the tuna farming industry. It was also moored off Granite Island between 1997 and 2004 where it served as a tourist attraction prior to the development of the Swim with the Tuna concept.

== Planning ==
Oceanic Victor's planning process officially commenced with an unsolicited proposal made to the Office of the State Coordinator General in 2015. The company subsequently sought planning approvals from various government departments and agencies, including PIRSA Aquaculture, the Department of Planning, Transport and Infrastructure, the Victor Harbor council and the Australian Environment Department under the EPBC Act.

Oceanic Victor's proprietors initially anticipated their attraction would be operational ahead of 12 December 2015, the commencement of the school holiday season.

On 16 December 2015, Oceanic Victors proposal was not deemed to be a Controlled Action under the EPBC Act, therefore Federal environmental approval was not required.

On 17 December 2015, a meeting of South Australia's Development Assessment Commission received Michael Dyer, Yasmine Stehr, Heather Montgomerie and Donna Ferretti representing the applicant, Roscoe Shelton for DEWNR, Heidi Alleway and Luke Fraser for PIRSA and fifteen other individuals. The Commission considered Oceanic Victor's application and approved it the following day.

A mooring point to accommodate cruise ships has also been proposed adjacent to Oceanic Victor's pilot aquaculture lease.

In January 2016, Mick Dyer told the Port Lincoln Times that prior to opening the company needed to "get the mooring organised, take footage of the bottom and brand the facility and the penguin centre.” The facility was expected to be towed into place off Granite Island in February 2016, pending the result of an appeal of the Development Assessment Commission's approval decision. In March 2016, the owners announced that the venture would return to Port Lincoln and reopen there, under the previous name of "Swim with the Tuna". The result of the appeal of the Development Assessment Commission's approval decision was expected in October or November 2016. The appeal was unsuccessful. In November 2016, Oceanic Victor announced that it would not be opening in 2016 as previously planned, nor during the 2016-17 South Australian school holidays.

Oceanic Victor opened to the public for the first time on 2 September 2017.

== Reception ==
Throughout the venture's planning process, the project attracted both support and opposition from community members of the Encounter Bay area. Some opponents raised concerns that the approval process seemed rushed and that the attraction might increase shark visitation to the area or adversely impact on little penguins which breed on the bay's rocky islands. A poll initiated by the Victor Harbor Times newspaper indicated that critics of the proposal may have outnumbered its supporters. On 10 January hundreds of protestors participated in a paddle-out demonstration to show their opposition to the tuna pen. A group called the Friends of the Encounter Coast was formed in response to the Oceanic Victor proposal and an appeal against the facility's approval was heard in the South Australian Environment, Resources and Development Court. Another protest on 21 February attracted hundreds of protesters and the support of Sea Shepherd. The appeal of the facility's approval was unsuccessful.

Director Mick Dyer rebutted some of the concerns expressed during interviews, media appearances and in a letter to the editor published in the Victor Harbor Times, published on 18 February 2016.

The company's directors expected Oceanic Victor to attract over 10,000 patrons in its first year of operation.
