= Grey mangrove =

Grey mangrove may refer to either of two species of mangrove:

- Avicennia marina - occurring around the Indian Ocean and into the western Pacific Ocean as far as New Zealand
- Conocarpus erectus (Buttonwood) - occurring on both sides of the Atlantic Ocean, along the eastern edge of the Pacific Ocean and in Melanesia and Polynesia
