= Sam Sarin =

Croatian fisherman and bluefin tuna entrepreneur (1936–2020)

Sime "Sam" Sarin (10 March 1936 – 21 June 2020) was a Croatian fisherman and businessperson instrumental in the development of the Southern bluefin tuna ranching industry and property development in the town of Port Lincoln in South Australia.

== Early life ==
Sarin was born in Kali, Croatia and emigrated to Australia in the 1950s where he first worked as a fruit picker and cane cutter.

== Career ==
Sarin's career began in the fishing industry then expanded into property development. He founded Australian Fishing Enterprises in 1987, which at the time of his death held half of the catch quota for the Southern bluefin tuna in Australia. AFE is part of the Sarin Group, which employs up to 300 people and aspires to be "the most professional, ethical and efficient tuna ranching company in the world." The Sarin Group also operates the Port Lincoln Slipway, Sarin Property Group and the Port Lincoln Tourist Park. The Sarin Property Group's portfolio includes the Port Lincoln Hotel.

Sarin appeared on the BRW Rich List in 2003 and 2004, with personal wealth listed at $330 and $220 million respectively. In 2002 he was described as the "undisputed king of the Port Lincoln tuna-farming industry."

He was named a Member of the Order of Australia in 2019 "for significant service to the fishing industry, to business, and to the community of Port Lincoln" and was a member of the Australian Seafood Industry Hall of Fame. Following his death, the City of Port Lincoln described him as "A quiet but influential benefactor, community supporter, fishing industry icon and city visionary."
