= Friend of the Sea =

Sustainable seafood organization

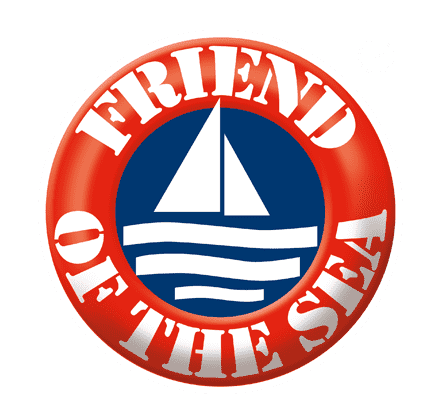
- Established: 2008
- Founder: Paolo Bray
- Type: Registered non-profit NGO
- Purpose: Sustainable seafood and other labelling
- Location: Milan, 20124, Corso Buenos Aires 45, Italy
- Key people: Paolo Bray (CEO), Franco Bray (President)
- Website: www.friendofthesea.org

Friend of the Sea is a project of the World Sustainability Organization for the certification and promotion of seafood from sustainable fisheries and sustainable aquaculture. It is the only certification scheme which, with the same logo, certifies both wild and farmed seafood.

== Overview ==
Friend of the Sea was started in 2008, by environmentalist and economist Paolo Bray, Director of International Programs of the Dolphin-Safe Tuna program and as a project of the Earth Island Institute, the NGO which operates the International Dolphin-Safe project. Some of the main world retailers participate, such as Carrefour, Coop Italia, Manor, Finiper, Aligro, Citysuper, Coldstorage, Conad, Despar, Esselunga, Fairprice, Lidl, Metro, Rewe, Spar, Walgreens, Walmart. Some important producers also have their products certified.

Friend of the Sea audits of seafood and omega−3 products from sustainable fisheries and aquaculture are carried out only by qualified auditors of international certification bodies accredited by national accreditation bodies. Friend of the Sea is the only standard for sustainable fisheries to be recognized by the national accreditation bodies. Audits and surveillance are carried out every year.

As of 2018, FoS certifies about 770 companies including both farmed and wild species including 44 approved fisheries and fleets, 3,000 products and 150 commercial species have been certified by FoS.

As per the 2015 UN State of Sustainability Initiatives, its certified volumes have "grown at a rate of 91% per annum between 2008 and 2015, reaching 9.3 million metric tons of FoS certified wild catch seafood in 2015."

Friend of the Sea, in collaboration with FEM2-Ambiente, has introduced the systematic use of DNA Barcoding to avoid fraud.

== Studies and recognitions ==
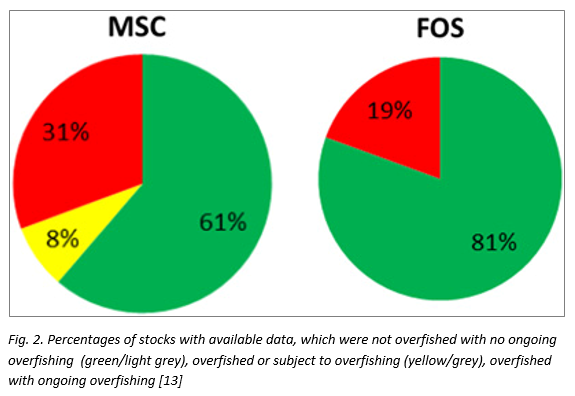

According to the “State of Sustainability Initiatives Review: Standards and the Blue Economy” published in 2016 by the International Institute for Sustainable Development (IISD), “FOS production has grown at a rate of 91% per annum between 2008 and 2015, reaching 9.3 million metric tons of FOS-certified wild catch seafood in 2015 (5.7% of global, 10.1% of total wild catch) making it the single largest source of certified catch on the global market.”

Friend of the Sea is a Member Associate of Infofish, the project of the Food and Agriculture Organization (FAO) of the United Nations, providing marketing information and technical advisory services to the fishery industry.

The peer-reviewed study “Evaluation and legal assessment of certified seafood” by Rainer Froese and Alexander Proelss concluded that “For the stocks with available status information, 19% (FOS) to 31% (MSC) Marine Stewardship Council had overfished stock sizes and were subject to ongoing overfishing.” thus highlighting the performance of FOS standards.

The report “De-Coding Seafood Eco-Labels: How the European Commission Can Help Consumers Access Sustainable Seafood” by Food and Water Watch Europe identified only 4 concerns regarding Friend of the Sea fisheries standard compared to 8 concerns regarding MSC.

== Conservation projects and campaigns ==
In May 2019, Friend of the Sea managed to lead Just Eat, Deliveroo and Menulog to take off shark fin soups off their menu in some countries.

FOS's Change.org petition to prevent ship strikes has obtained almost 50.000 signatures. FOS managed to lead the major members of the World Shipping Council to request the Sri Lankan government to shift the shipping lanes 15 miles South of current lanes, to reduce whales strikes by over 90%.

Friend of the Sea collaborates with Tartalife project, introducing a Turtle Safe certification label to motivate fishermen and shipowners to deploy Turtle Excluder Devices (TEDs) and other turtle bycatch reduction measures.

Friend of the Sea supports the Maldives Whale Shark Research Program (MWSRP), a research based conservation charity dedicated to whale shark studies and fostering community-focused conservation initiatives in the Maldives and the greater Indian Ocean.

Friend of the Sea supports The Aquaculture Development for the Environment Organisation (ADE), a non-profit organisation that develops coral reef conservation and research projects in Fiji, such as reef rehabilitation with the involvement of the local community.

== Compliance and criteria ==
Friend of the Sea's criteria compliance is verified by independent accredited certification bodies.

== See also ==
- Ecolabel
- Marine Stewardship Council
