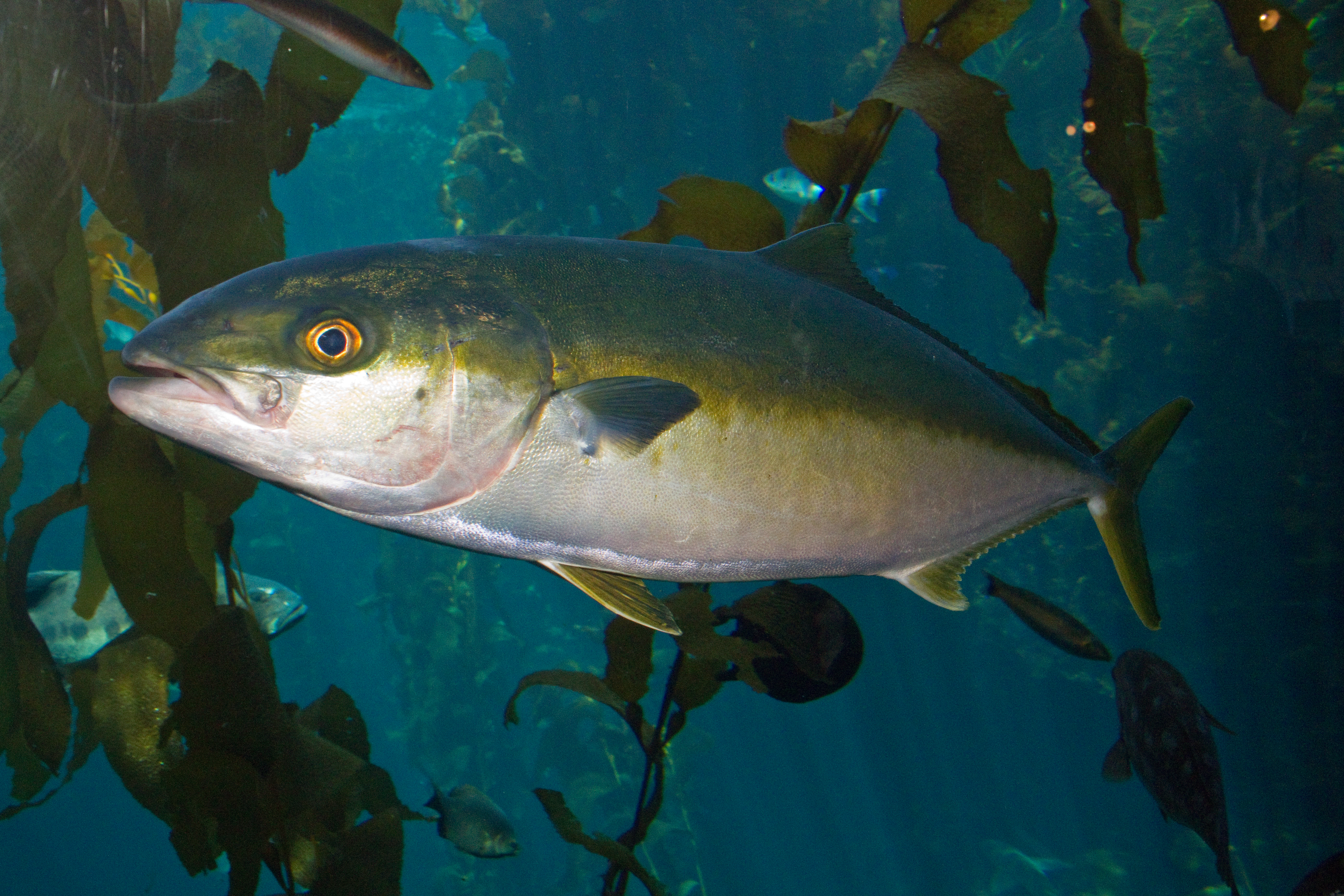

Conservation status
- Least Concern (IUCN 3.1)

Scientific classification
- Kingdom: Animalia
- Phylum: Chordata
- Class: Actinopterygii
- Division: Teleostei
- Order: Carangiformes
- Suborder: Carangoidei
- Family: Carangidae
- Genus: Seriola
- Species: S. lalandi

Binomial name
- Seriola lalandi Valenciennes, 1833

Synonyms
- Lichia pappei Bleeker,1859; Seriola pappei (Bleeker, 1859); Seriola grandis Castelnau, 1872; Seriola foncki Delfin, 1903; Seriola banisteri J. L. B. Smith, 1959

= Yellowtail amberjack =

Species of fish

The yellowtail amberjack, yellowtail kingfish, hiramasa or great amberjack (Seriola lalandi) is a large fish found in the oceans of the Southern Hemisphere. Although previously thought to be found in all oceans and seas, recent genetic analysis restricts S. lalandi proper to the Southern Hemisphere waters. However, they are found in Northern Hemisphere waters during certain times of the year. The fish was given its name by Pierre Antoine Delalande, a naturalist who first informed zoologist Achille Valenciennes of the existence of this species. His reason for the use of the word Seriola (feminine diminutive form of seria, a large earthenware pot) to name the fish is uncertain, but the epithet lalandi was derived from his surname.

== Taxonomy ==
The yellowtail amberjack was formally described in 1833 by French zoologist Achille Valenciennes from type specimens sent to him by naturalist and explorer Pierre Antoine Delalande, who is honoured in its specific name. FishBase includes populations of similar fish in the Northern Hemisphere within this species, but other authorities regard S. aureovittata from the North Pacific Ocean around Japan and S. dorsalis of the northeastern Pacific as separate species.

== Distribution and habitat ==
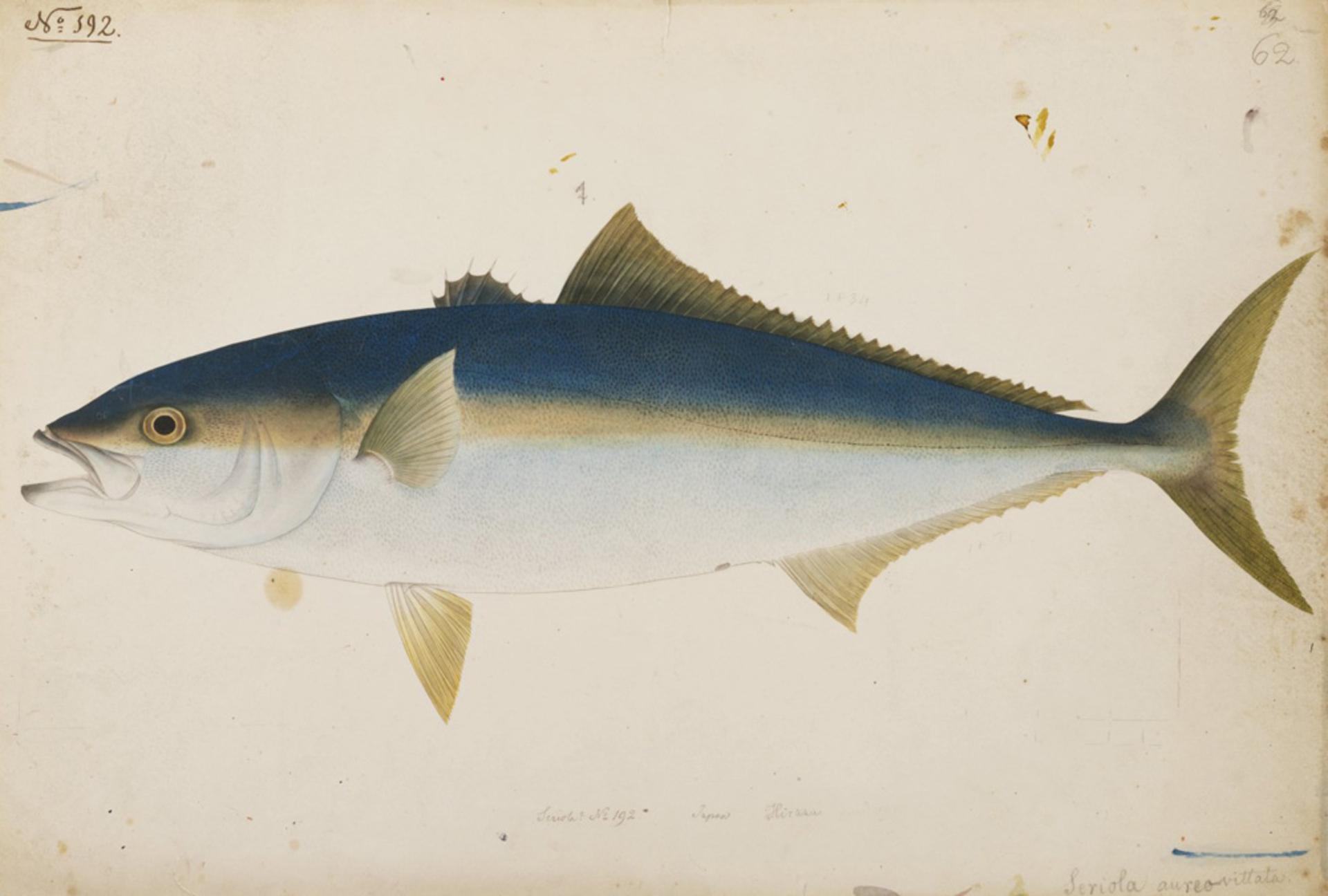
Yellowtail amberjack, painting by Kawahara Keiga (川原慶賀), 1823–1829

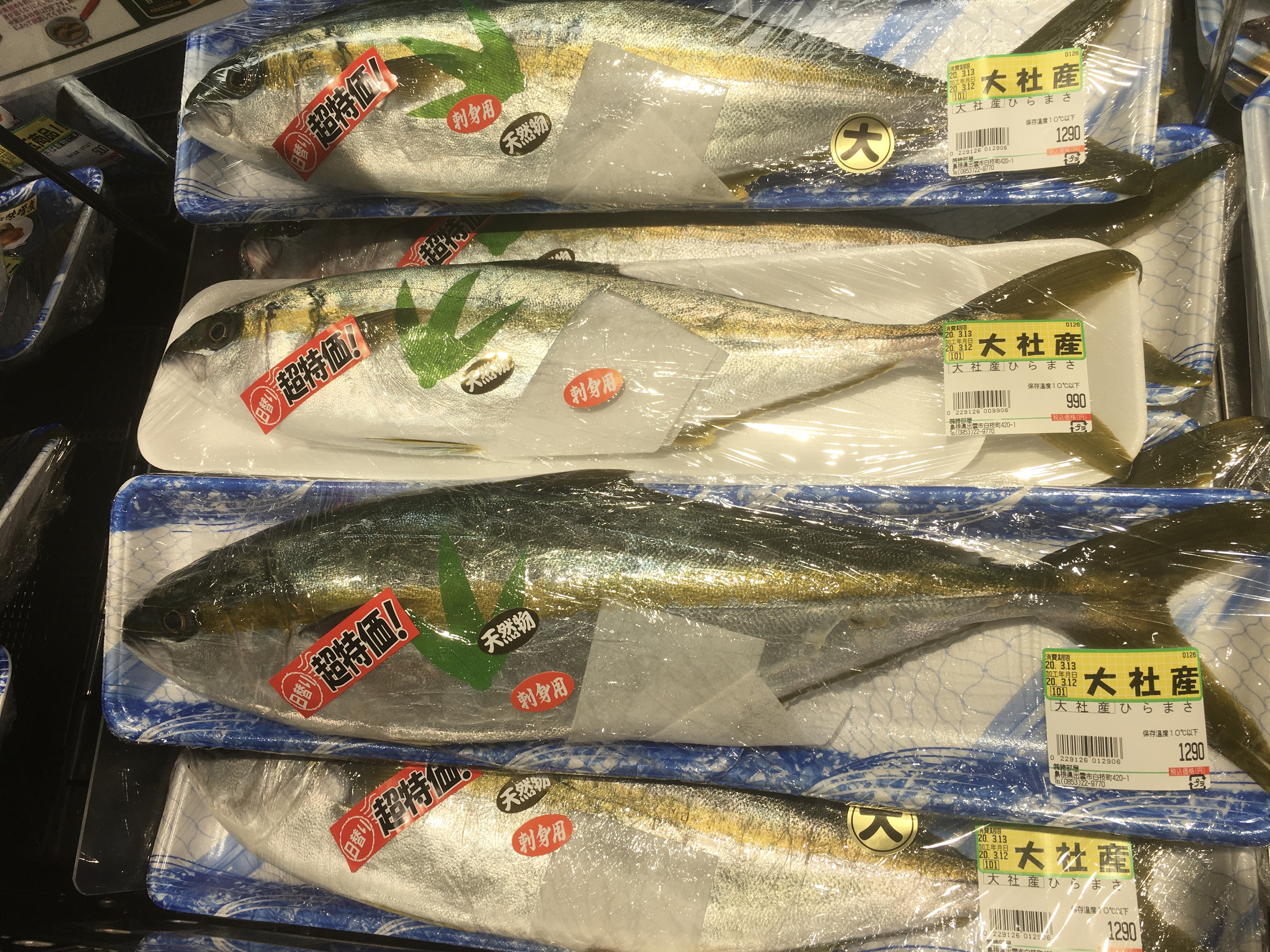
Yellowtail amberjack (hiramasa) being sold at a market in Shimane Prefecture, Japan

The yellowtail amberjack occurs in tropical and temperate waters of the Southern Hemisphere and the northern Pacific. In Australia, it is recorded from North Reef, Queensland, (23° 11′ S) to Trigg Island, Western Australia, (31° 52′ S), and as far south as Tasmania.

The yellowtail amberjack (or yellowtail kingfish as it is known in Australia) is a highly mobile pelagic species, and tends to either form single-species schools, or combine with southern bluefin tuna (Thunnus maccoyii) and silver trevally (Pseudocaranx dentex). They prefer water temperatures of 17‒24 °C.

In general, they inhabit rocky reefs and adjacent sandy areas in coastal waters and occasionally enter estuaries. They are found from shallow water down to depths around 50 m (160 ft), although have been caught from over 300 m (980 ft).

Young fish up to 7 kg (15 lb) are known to form shoals of several hundred fish. They are generally found close to the coast, while larger fish are more common around deep reefs and offshore islands. Juvenile yellowtail amberjack are rarely seen, as they are often found far from land associated with floating debris or weed which provide camouflage. Juveniles are yellow with black bands. This colouration fades as the fish ages, and by about 30 cm (12 in) in length, the fish has assumed its adult colouration.

== Biology ==
Very little is known of the yellowtail amberjack's biology, including its habitat preferences throughout juvenile life stages, migration patterns, and wild reproductive behaviour. Adults live around rocky reefs, rocky outcrops, and drop-offs in coastal waters, and around pinnacles and offshore islands. Maximum length is often reported to reach up to 180 cm (71 in). Large kingfish caught near Port Augusta in South Australia have been recorded at weights of between 40 and 50 kilograms (88 and 110 lb). Recreational fishers have reported that kingfish catches near Port Augusta were more reliable when the Playford Power Stations were discharging hot water into the upper Spencer Gulf. The power stations have been decommissioned, but kingfish still migrate to upper Spencer Gulf as the southern gulf water cools.

=== Sydney Harbour ===
Before the introduction of kingfish traps (for commercial fishing) in the 1970s, huge numbers of yellowtail amberjack were in Sydney Harbour. These traps were so effective that some studies suggested the traps may have wiped out as much as 60% of the larger amberjack population. In the mid-1990s under heavy pressure from recreational anglers, Bob Martin, the minister for fisheries, prohibited the use of these traps in Sydney Harbour.

== Behaviour ==
Yellowtail amberjacks are known for their curiosity around human vessels. The fish often accompany stingrays in harbours and estuaries, making use of the stingrays ability to sense fish through electroreception.

=== Diet ===
Being a pelagic fish, yellowtail amberjack are highly active predators, usually in schools or in pairs. Their main diet consists of baitfish including yellowtail mackerel, squid, prawns, garfish, pilchards and kahawai. Yellowtail amberjacks are one of the major predator species in New Zealand waters, and have been recorded eating seabirds.

== Use ==
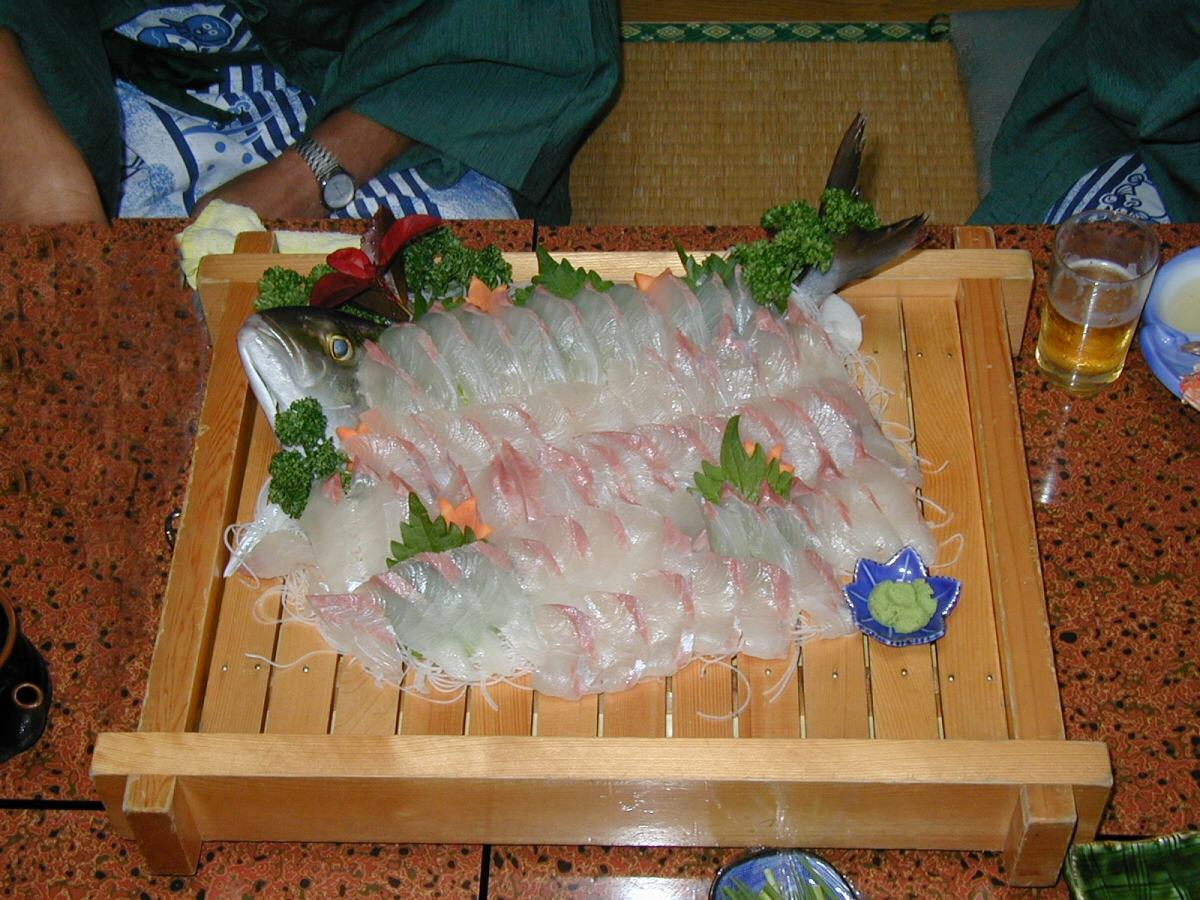
Yellowtail amberjack sashimi

Early European settlers to New Zealand disliked the fish (known as kingfish), believing the taste to be flavourless and coarse. However, this perception changed over time and it has since become one of the most popular sporting species of fish, and is both fished commercially and raised through aquaculture.

Yellowtail amberjack is found on restaurant menus throughout the world, and, known as "hiramasa", is a popular fish as sashimi.

=== In Māori culture ===
In New Zealand, yellowtail amberjacks are a traditional food of Māori, who call the fish haku. The fish was often caught using hooks that incorporated iridescent pāua shell, or by capturing schools of fish in large nets. The fish is traditionally associated with qualities of warriors and leaders, and some iwi associate the fish with the end of life.

=== Aquaculture ===
S. lalandi has been established as a suitable candidate for marine aquaculture. In contrast to the culture of the Japanese amberjack (S. quinqueradiata), which has long been cultured extensively in Japan, juveniles of S. lalandi are not easily available from the wild, and juveniles are produced in hatcheries from captive-breeding stock. In 2010, the Stehr Group in South Australia was the largest producer of cultured S. lalandi in the world. Trials elsewhere in Australia have been undertaken and in some cases abandoned after stock losses. Water quality concerns were raised following farmed kingfish mortalities in upper Spencer Gulf, South Australia, in 2011. In the late 2010s, yellowtail kingfish farms were established near Geraldton and the Abrolhos Islands in Western Australia by Indian Ocean Fresh Australia and Huon Aquaculture, respectively.

Some attempts have been made to culture the species in New Zealand, both in sea cages and a large land-based system at Parengarenga Harbour (northern New Zealand). Chile is currently testing sea-cage and land-based farming methods. In Germany, S. lalandi is being cultivated in the first land-based seafish-culture. A Dutch company, The Kingfish Company, is planning to open a land-based aquaculture operation in Maine, U.S.A., in 2022. Most cultured S. lalandi is sold to the Japanese restaurant market for consumption as sashimi. Amberjack can be eaten in a variety of ways, including grilling and drying.
