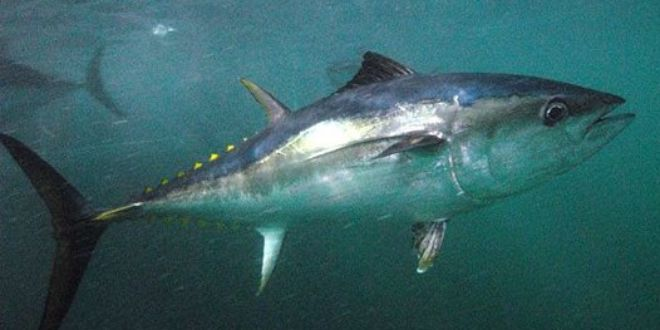

Conservation status
- Endangered (IUCN 3.1)

Scientific classification
- Kingdom: Animalia
- Phylum: Chordata
- Class: Actinopterygii
- Division: Teleostei
- Order: Scombriformes
- Family: Scombridae
- Genus: Thunnus
- Subgenus: Thunnus
- Species: T. maccoyii

Binomial name
- Thunnus maccoyii (Castelnau, 1872)

Synonyms
- Thynnus maccoyii Castelnau, 1872; Thunnus phillipsi Jordan & Evermann, 1926

= Southern bluefin tuna =

Species of fish

The southern bluefin tuna (Thunnus maccoyii) is a tuna of the family Scombridae found in open southern Hemisphere waters of all the world's oceans mainly between 30°S and 50°S, to nearly 60°S. At up to 2.5 metres (8 ft 2 in) and weighing up to 260 kilograms (570 lb), it is among the larger bony fishes.

Southern bluefin tuna, like other pelagic tuna species, are part of a group of bony fishes that can maintain their body core temperature up to 10 °C (18 °F) above the ambient temperature. This advantage enables them to maintain high metabolic output for predation and migrating large distances. The southern bluefin tuna is an opportunistic feeder, preying on a wide variety of fish, crustaceans, cephalopods, salps, and other marine fishes and crustaceans.

== Environmental/physical challenges ==
The southern bluefin tuna is a predatory organism with a high metabolic need. These are pelagic animals, but migrate vertically through the water column, up to 2,500 m (8,200 ft) in depth. They also migrate between tropical and cool temperate waters in the search for food. The seasonal migrations are between waters off the coast of Australia and the Indian Ocean. Although the preferred temperature range for southern bluefin tuna is from 18–20 °C (64–68 °F), they can endure temperatures as low as 3 °C (37 °F) at low depths, and as high as 30 °C (86 °F), when spawning.

This wide range of temperature and depth changes poses a challenge to the respiratory and circulatory systems of the southern bluefin tunas. Tuna swim continuously and at high speeds and, therefore, have a high demand for oxygen. The oxygen concentration in the water changes with the change in temperature, being lower at high temperatures. Tuna are, however, driven by the availability of food, not by thermal properties of water. Bluefin tuna, unlike other species of tuna, maintain a fairly constant red muscle (swimming muscle) temperature over a wide range of ambient temperatures. So, in addition to being endotherms, bluefin tuna are also thermoregulators. The species is listed as Endangered by the IUCN.

== Physiology ==
=== Respiratory physiology ===
Respiratory systems of southern bluefin tunas are adapted to their high oxygen demand. Bluefin tunas are obligate ram ventilators: they drive water into the buccal cavity through their mouth, then over the gills, while swimming. Therefore, unlike most other teleost fish, the southern bluefin tuna does not require a separate pump mechanism to pump water over the gills. Ram ventilation is said to be obligatory in southern bluefin tunas, because the buccal-opercular pump system used by other teleost fish became incapable of producing a stream of ventilation vigorous enough for their needs. All species of tuna in general have lost the opercular pump, requiring a quicker movement of oxygenated water over the gills than induced by the suction of the opercular pump. Therefore, if they stop swimming, tunas suffocate due to a lack of water flow over the gills.

The oxygen need and oxygen uptake of the southern bluefin tuna are directly related. As the tuna increases its metabolic need by swimming faster, water flows into the mouth and over the gills more quickly, increasing the oxygen uptake. Additionally, since there is no energy required to pump the water over the gills, the tunas have adapted an increased energy output to swimming muscles. The oxygen and nutrient uptake in the circulatory system is transported to these swimming muscles rather than to tissues required to pump water over the gills in other teleost fish.

Based on the principles of the Fick equation, the rate of the gas diffusion across the gas exchange membrane is directly proportional to the respiratory surface area, and inversely proportional to the thickness of the membrane. Tunas have highly specialized gills, with a surface area 7–9 times larger than that of other aquatic environment organisms. This increased surface area allows more oxygen to be in contact with the respiratory surface and therefore diffusion to take place more quickly (as represented by the direct proportionality in the Fick equation). This massive increase in surface area of the gills of the southern bluefin tuna is due to a higher density of secondary lamella in the gill filaments.

The southern bluefin tuna, like other tuna species, has a very thin gas-exchange membrane. Tunas have a barrier thickness of 0.5μm, compared with 10μm of dogfish, 5μm of toadfish and less than 5μm of trouts. This means that the oxygen must diffuse a short distance across the respiratory surface to get to the blood. Similarly to the increased surface area, this allows the highly metabolic organism to take oxygenated blood into the circulatory system more quickly. On top of a quicker rate of diffusion in the respiratory system of southern bluefin tuna, there is a significant difference in the efficiency of the oxygen uptake. While other teleost fish typically utilize 27–50% of the oxygen in the water, the tuna's utilization rates have been observed as high as 50-60%. This overall high oxygen uptake works in close coordination with a well-adapted circulatory system to meet the high metabolic needs of the southern bluefin tuna.

The oxygen dissociation curves for southern bluefin tunas show a reverse temperature effect between 10 and 23 °C (50–73 °F), and temperature insensitivity between 23 and 36 °C (73–97 °F). Reverse temperature shift might prevent premature oxygen dissociation from hemoglobin as it is warmed in rete mirabile. Root effect and a large Bohr factor were also observed at 23 °C (73 °F).

=== Circulatory physiology ===
The cardiovascular system of tunas, as in many fish species, can be described in terms of two RC networks, in which the system is supplied by a single generator (the heart). The ventral and dorsal aorta feed resistance of the gills and systemic vasculature, respectively. The heart in tunas is contained inside a fluid-filled pericardial cavity. Their hearts are exceptionally large, with ventricle masses and cardiac output roughly four to five times larger than those of other active fishes. They consist of four chambers, as in other teleosts: sinus venosus, atrium, ventricle, and bulbus arteriosus.

Tunas have type IV hearts, which have more than 30% compact myocardium with coronary arteries in compact and spongy myocardium. Their ventricles are large, thick-walled, and pyramidal in shape, allowing for generation of high ventricular pressures. The muscle fibers are arranged around the ventricle in a way that allows rapid ejection of stroke volume, because ventricles can contract both vertically and transversely at the same time. Myocardium itself is well vascularized, with highly branched arterioles and venules, as well as a high degree of capillarization.

Major arteries and veins run longitudinally to and from the red swimming muscles, which are found close to the spinal column, just underneath the skin. Small arteries branch off and penetrate the red muscle, delivering oxygenated blood, whereas veins take deoxygenated blood back to the heart. The red muscles also have a high myoglobin content and capillary density, where many of the capillaries branch off. This helps increase surface area and red-cell residence time. The veins and arteries are organized in a way that allows countercurrent heat exchange. They are juxtaposed and branched extensively to form rete mirabile. This arrangement allows the heat produced by the red muscles to be retained within them, as it can be transferred from the venous blood to the ingoing arterial blood.
Tunas have the highest arterial blood pressure among all fishes, due to a high resistance of blood flow in the gills. They also have a high heart rate, cardiac output, and ventilation rate. To achieve high cardiac outputs, tunas increase their heart rate exclusively (other teleosts may increase their stroke volume as well). High cardiac outputs in southern bluefin tuna are necessary to achieve their maximum metabolic rates. The bulbus arteriosus can take up an entire stroke volume, maintaining a smooth blood flow over the gills through diastole. This might, in turn, increase the rate of gas exchange. Their heart rate is also affected by temperature; at normal temperatures can it reach up to 200 beats/min.

The blood of southern bluefin tuna is composed of erythrocytes, reticulocytes, ghost cells, lymphocytes, thrombocytes, eosinophilic granulocytes, neutrophilic granulocytes, and monocytes. Southern bluefin tuna has a high blood hemoglobin content (13.25—17.92 g/dl) and, therefore, a high oxygen carrying capacity. This results from an increased hematocrit and mean cellular hemoglobin content (MCHC). The erythrocyte content in the blood ranges from 2.13 to 2.90 million/l which is at least twice that of adult Atlantic salmon, reflecting the active nature of southern bluefin tuna. Because the MCHC is high, more blood can be delivered to tissues without an increase in energy used to pump more viscous blood. For southern bluefin tuna, this is important in blood vessels that are not protected by heat exchangers when they migrate to colder environments.

=== Integration of respiratory and circulatory organs ===
Tunas are more mobile than any terrestrial animals and are some of the most active fish; therefore, they require highly efficient respiratory and circulatory systems. Southern bluefin tuna, as well as other species of tunas, have developed many adaptations in order to achieve this.
Their respiratory system has adapted to rapidly take up oxygen from water. For example, tunas switched from a buccal-opercular pump system to ram ventilation, which allows them to drive large quantities of water over their gills. Gills have, in turn, become highly specialized to increase the rate of oxygen diffusion. The circulatory system works together with the respiratory system to rapidly transport oxygen to tissues. Due to high hemoglobin levels, the blood of southern bluefin tuna has a high oxygen carrying capacity. Furthermore, their large hearts, with a characteristic organization of muscle fibres, allow for comparatively high cardiac outputs, as well as rapid ejection of stroke volume. This, together with the organization of blood vessels and a countercurrent heat exchange system, allows the southern bluefin tuna to rapidly deliver oxygen to tissue, while preserving energy necessary for their active lifestyle.

=== Osmoregulation ===
==== Environmental osmotic conditions ====
Southern bluefin tuna migrate between a variety of different ocean regions, however the osmotic conditions faced by the tuna stay relatively similar. This species of tuna inhabits ocean areas that are relatively high in salinity compared to the rest of the world's oceans. Like other marine teleost fish, the southern bluefin tuna maintain a constant ion concentration in both their intracellular and extracellular fluids. This regulation of an internal ion concentration classifies southern bluefin tuna as osmoregulators.

The blood plasma, interstitial fluid, and cytoplasm of cells in southern bluefin tuna are hyposmotic to the surrounding ocean water. This means that the ion concentration within these fluids is low relative to the seawater. The standard osmotic pressure of seawater is 1.0 osmole/L, while the osmotic pressure in the blood plasma of the southern bluefin tuna is approximately half of that. Without the mechanism of osmoregulation present, the tuna would lose water to the surrounding environment and ions would diffuse from the seawater into the fluids of the tuna to establish equilibrium.

The southern bluefin tuna acquires its water by drinking seawater: its only available water source. Since the osmotic pressure of the fluids in the tuna must be hyposmotic to the seawater that has been taken up, there is a net loss in ions from the tuna. Ions diffuse across their concentration gradient from the fluids of the tuna to the external seawater. The result is a net movement of water into the fluid of the bluefin tuna, with the net movement of ions being into the seawater. Southern bluefin tuna, along with other marine teleost fish, have acquired a variety of proteins and mechanisms which allow the secretion of ions through the gill epithelium.

Due to the southern bluefin tuna's high metabolic need, ions must be taken up relatively quickly to ensure sufficient concentrations for cellular function. Tuna are able to drink the seawater as they constantly swim in order to ensure sufficient ion concentrations. The seawater is specifically high in sodium and chloride ions which together make up approximately 80% of the ions in the water. The intake of sodium and chloride, along with lower relative concentrations of potassium and calcium ions in the seawater allow southern bluefin tuna to generate the action potentials required for muscle contraction.

==== Primary osmoregulatory system and features ====
Tunas have elevated levels of ion and water transfer due to their elevated gill and intestinal Na^{+}/K^{+} ATPase activity, in which this activity is estimated to be about four to five times higher when compared to other freshwater vertebrates, such as rainbow trout. The gills, due to their large surface area, play a significant role toward osmoregulation in the tuna to maintaining water and ionic balance by excreting NaCl. The intestine also contributes toward compromising for the osmotic loss of water to the surroundings by absorbing NaCl to withdraw the needed water from the lumen contents.

The kidney also plays a crucial role toward tuna osmoregulation by excreting divalent ionic salts such as magnesium and sulfate ions. By the use of active transport, the tuna could move solutes out of their cells and use the kidneys as a means to preserve fluidity.

==== Anatomy and biochemistry involved in osmoregulation ====
The primary sites of gas exchange in marine teleosts, the gills, are also responsible for osmoregulation. Because gills are designed to increase surface area and minimize diffusion distance for gas exchange between the blood and water, they may contribute to the problem of water loss by osmosis and passive salt gain. This is called the osmo-respiratory compromise. To overcome this, tunas constantly drink seawater to compensate for water loss. They excrete highly concentrated urine which is approximately isosmotic to blood plasma, i.e. urine solute to plasma solute ratio is close to 1 (U/P≅1). Because of this, solely excreting urine is not sufficient to resolve the osmoregulatory problem in tunas. In turn, they excrete only the minimum volume of urine necessary to rid of solutes that are not excreted by other routes, and the salt is mostly excreted via gills. This is why the composition of solutes in urine differs significantly from that of the blood plasma. Urine has a high concentration of divalent ions, such as Mg^{2+} and SO_{4}^{2−} (U/P>>1), as these ions are mostly excreted by the kidneys keeping their concentration in blood plasma from rising. Monovalent ions (Na^{+}, Cl^{−}, K^{+}) are excreted by the gills, so their U/P ratios in the urine are below 1. The excretion of inorganic ions by structures other than kidneys is called the extrarenal salt excretion.

In southern bluefin tuna and other marine teleosts, specialized ion-transporting cells called ionocytes (previously known as mitochondrion-rich cells and chloride cells) is the primary sites of NaCl excretion Ionocytes are usually found on the gill arch and filament, though in some cases can be also found on the gill lamellae when exposed to various environmental stressors. Ionocytes are interspersed between pavement cells which occupy the largest proportion of the gill epithelium. Ionocytes are highly metabolically active, as indicated by the large number of mitochondria (which produce energy in the form of ATP). They are also rich in Na^{+}/K^{+} ATPases, in comparison to other cells. Ionocytes have an elaborate intracellular tubular system, continuous with the basolateral membrane (facing blood). The apical side (facing the environment) is typically invaginated below the surrounding pavement cells, forming apical crypts. Leaky paracellular pathways exist between the neighbouring ionocytes.

Ionocytes of marine teleosts, such as the southern bluefin tuna, employ specific transport mechanisms to excrete salt. By ingesting seawater they uptake water and electrolytes, including Na^{+}, Cl^{−}, Mg^{2+} and SO_{4}^{2−}. As seawater passes through the esophagus it is quickly desalinated as Na^{+} and Cl^{−} ions move down their concentration gradients into the body. In the intestine, water is being absorbed in association with NaCl cotransport.

Inside the gill ionocyte, the Na^{+}/K^{+} ATPases on the basolateral membrane maintain a low sodium concentration. The NKCC (Na^{+}-K^{+}-Cl^{−} channel) cotransporter moves K^{+} and Cl^{−} ions inside the cell, while Na^{+} diffuses in, down its concentration gradient. The K^{+} ions can leak out of the cell through their channels on the basolateral membrane, whereas Cl^{−} ions diffuse out, through their channels on the apical membrane. The gradient created by Cl^{−} allows Na^{+} ions to passively diffuse out of the cell via paracellular transport (through tight junctions).

==== Special adaptations for osmoregulation ====
The southern bluefin tuna have a large gill surface area which is important for oxygen consumption and handling high osmoregulatory costs, associated with the high resting metabolic rate. They can adapt to increasing water salinity, where the ionocyte increase in size, gill filaments become thicker, the surface area of the basolateral membrane increases, and the intracellular tubular system proliferates. Teleost fish do not have the loop of Henle in the kidneys and are, therefore, not able to produce hyperosmotic urine. Instead, they secrete small amounts of urine frequently in order to prevent water loss and excrete NaCl thorough the gills. Additionally ram-ventilators such as tunas and billfishes have specialized gill structures: adjacent lamellae and filaments are fused to prevent gill filaments and lamellae from collapsing under high water flow. Here, ionocytes have also been found on these specialized interlamellar, lamellar, and filament fusion in larval and adult Yellowfin Tuna (Thunnus albacares).

== Thermoregulation and metabolism ==
=== Physiological challenges ===
Southern bluefin tunas are thermo-conserving and can function over a wide range of temperature conditions, which allows them to dive from the surface of the water to depths of 1,000 m (3,300 ft), in only a few minutes. They forage in temperate waters of the southern hemisphere oceans, during winter in Australia, and migrate to tropical areas in the north-western Indian Ocean, from spring to autumn, for the spawning season. Their preferred temperature range is 18–20 °C (64–68 °F), with most of their time (91%) spent below 21 °C (70 °F). Southern bluefin tunas experience a wide range of ambient water temperatures, from a minimum of 2.6 °C (36.7 °F) to a maximum of 30.4 °C (86.7 °F). All species of tuna are reported to spawn in water temperatures above 24 °C (75 °F). However, 24 °C (75 °F) is outside, or at the upper limit, of temperature tolerances for bluefin tunas. Large individuals have been found to withstand temperatures of less than 10 °C (50 °F) and as low as 7 °C (45 °F) for over 10 hours, possibly to search for prey. During the day they migrate through depths between 150–600 m (490–1,970 ft), but at night they stay in waters that are 50 m (160 ft) or less in depth.

Heat exchange in southern bluefin tuna is a unique adaption among teleost fishes. They are endotherms, which means that they can maintain their internal temperature elevated above water temperature. Heat is lost through heat transfer throughout the whole body surface and the gills, so prevention of metabolic heat loss is important. This is an adaptive feature, because it is far more difficult for an organism to maintain a temperature differential with its environment in water than in air. It allows tunas to have faster metabolic reactions, to be more active, and to exploit colder environments. A disadvantage is that they require a high energy input and insulation, and there is potential for greater heat loss, because of the high temperature gradient with the environment. To reduce heat loss, southern bluefin tunas have reduced their heat conduction by the presence of oxidative muscle tissues and fat, as muscle and fat have low heat conductivity, according to Fourier's law of heat conduction. Their heat convection is also reduced. Since the heat transfer coefficient depends on an animal's body shape, tunas increased their body size, adopted a fusiform shape, and their internal tissue arrangement is based on different thermal conductances.

=== Adaptations involved in temperature regulation ===
Southern bluefin tunas often migrate vertically through the water column in search of their preferred temperature, and they spend time in cooler waters seeking prey. Some have hypothesized that they take refuge in warmer areas of water fronts and eddies after these foraging periods, but others suggest that these migrations are only associated with the aggregation of prey. Either way, it is clear that southern bluefin tuna have developed complex physiological mechanisms to maintain their body temperature (T_{B}) significantly above the ambient water temperature in these changing conditions. In fact, tuna can maintain the temperature of their muscles at 5–20 °C (9–36 °F) above the temperature of surrounding water. Overall, tuna do not have a set body temperature point; rather it maintains its T_{B} within a narrow range, with variations of only 4–5 °C (7–9 °F) over time and from individual to individual.

In contrast to the warm muscle and viscera of swimming bluefin tunas, the heart and gills remain at or near ambient water temperature in all tuna species. Tunas achieve regulation of body temperature by employing complex vascular structures called rete mirabile. In bluefin tuna, large lateral cutaneous vessels that branch off into the arteries and veins of rete mirabile supply blood to the red muscle, instead of a centrally located aorta. Rete mirabile function as countercurrent heat exchangers that prevent metabolic heat loss at the gills. Warm-bodied fish, such the southern bluefin tuna, maintain their T_{B} by varying the efficiency of heat exchangers. Some oxygen is typically lost to outgoing venous blood in the process of heat exchange, depending on heat exchanger efficiency, which can be influenced by the rate of blood flow and blood vessel diameter.

As tunas migrate to greater depths, often looking for prey, they encounter cooler water temperatures at the gill surface. To maintain normal levels of oxygen transport in these conditions, they have developed unique blood respiratory properties. The oxygen carrying capacity in southern bluefin tuna is high, due to the high hemoglobin (Hb) concentration. The blood affinity for oxygen is also elevated. Normally, blood affinity for oxygen would change with changes in temperature experienced at gills (in comparison to warmer adjacent tissues); however, Hb in southern bluefin tuna shows insensitivity to temperature, and a reverse temperature effect between 10 and 23 °C (50 and 73 °F) (Hb-O_{2} binding is endothermic). Due to their anatomical positioning, the heart and the liver are the coldest organs and significant work needs to be expended for them to serve a regionally warmer body. It is likely that the reversed temperature effect on oxygen binding was developed to ensure adequate unloading of oxygen at the heart and liver, especially in colder waters when the difference in temperature between these organs and the swimming muscle is the greatest.

Since southern bluefin tunas must constantly be swimming to drive water over the gills and provide their bodies with oxygen, there is a requirement for their metabolic rate to constantly be high. Unlike other organisms, the southern bluefin tuna cannot expend more energy to produce heat in cold temperatures, while slowing down metabolism to cool down in high temperature waters and maintain a homeostatic temperature. Instead, the southern bluefin tuna seems to implement a system that regulates how actively the rete mirable system heats the tissues. Experiments involving the southern bluefin tuna have led researchers to believe that this species of tuna has developed a shunting system. When the southern bluefin tuna experiences cold temperatures, more blood is directed to the rete vascular system, heating muscle tissue, while in warm temperatures, blood is shunted to the venous and arterial systems, reducing the heat in the muscle tissues.

The tuna's heart must pump blood to the bodily extremities at a quick rate to conserve heat and reduce heat loss. The heart of tunas is able to adapt to colder water temperatures, mainly by increasing blood flow and pumping warm blood to the muscle tissues at a faster rate.

In addition to the main source of heat loss at the gills, there is a significant amount of heat lost to the lower temperature water through the body surface. The southern bluefin tuna, being considered a large fish, has a relatively low surface-area-to-volume ratio. This low surface-area-to-volume ratio explains why there is a more significant amount of heat lost at the site of the gills compared to the body surface. As a result, the rete vascular system is located mostly at the site of the gills, but also at several other organs in the tuna. Specifically, due to the high metabolic demand of the southern bluefin tuna, the stomach is an organ requiring a high demand of thermoregulation. It is only able to digest food at specific temperatures, often much higher than the temperature of the surrounding water. Since the food is ingested along with a large amount of seawater, the contents must be heated to a temperature that allows the food to be digested and the nutrients and ions taken up. The southern bluefin tuna seems to increase blood flow to the stomach at times of increased digestion, by increasing the diameter of blood vessels flowing to the stomach, allowing more warm blood to reach the organ at a quicker rate.

The eyes and the brain of the southern bluefin tuna are a common area of research involving the thermoregulatory systems of this species. Both the eyes and the brain maintain a remarkably high temperature when compared to the surrounding water environment, often 15–20 °C (27–36 °F) higher than the temperature of the water. The carotid rete carries blood to the brain and seems to play a role in the elevated temperatures of both the brain and the eyes of the southern bluefin tuna. The carotid rete has been observed to have strong insulation properties, allowing blood to travel a great distance throughout the body while reducing the amount of heat lost to surrounding tissues prior to the brain and eyes. The elevated temperatures in the brain and eyes allow the southern bluefin tuna to search for food more effectively by reducing reaction time and creating stronger vision. This is due to the increased axon activity that is directly correlated to temperature: high temperatures allowing signal transduction to take place more quickly.

=== Special adaptations unique to habitat/lifestyle ===
One of the adaptations that allow bluefin tunas to have large migratory patterns is their endothermic nature, whereby they conserve heat in their blood and prevent its loss to the environment. They maintain their body temperature above the ambient water temperature in order to improve their locomotor muscle efficiency, especially at high speeds and when pursuing prey below the thermocline region. It has been hypothesized that tunas can rapidly alter their whole-body thermal conductivity by at least two orders of magnitude. This is done by disengaging the heat exchangers to allow rapid warming as the tuna ascend from cold water into warmer surface waters, and are then reactivated to conserve heat when they return into the depths. Through this unique ability, tunas can reach out into otherwise hazardously cold water in order to hunt for food or escape from predators. Variations in their muscle temperatures are not necessarily influenced by water temperatures or that of swimming speeds, which indicates the ability of the bluefin tuna to control the level of efficiency of their heat exchange system. Relating to the efficiency of oxygen extraction, tuna gill structure maximizes contact between water and the respiratory epithelium, which minimizes anatomical and physiological "dead space" in order to enable more than 50% oxygen-extraction efficiencies. This allows the fish to maintain a high rate of oxygen consumption as it continually swims out to others areas of oceans in search of food and ground for growth and reproduction.

== Commercial fishing ==
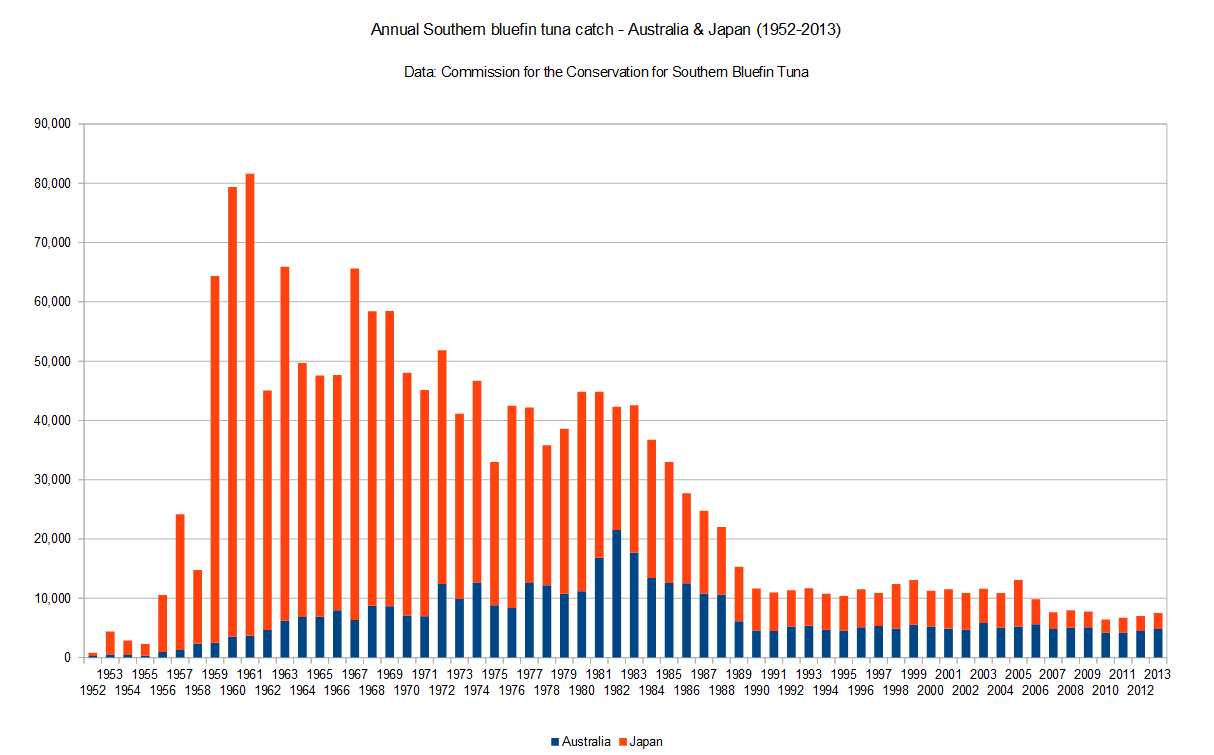
Southern bluefin tuna catch - Australia & Japan (1952-2013)

Southern bluefin tuna are targeted by fishing fleets from a number of nations. This occurs on the high seas and within the Exclusive Economic Zones of Australia, New Zealand, Indonesia and South Africa. The onset of industrial fishing in the 1950s, in conjunction with ever-improving technologies, such as GPS, fishfinders, satellite imagery, etc., and the knowledge of migration routes, has led to the overexploitation of southern bluefin tuna across its entire range. Improved refrigeration techniques and a demanding global market saw global SBT catch plummet from 80,000 tonnes a year during the 1960s to 40,000 tonnes a year by 1980. Australian catch peaked in 1982 at 21,500 tonnes, and the total population of SBT has since declined by about 92 percent. There was a pressing obligation to reduce harvesting pressure southern bluefin tuna populations in the mid-1980s. The main nations fishing the species adapted their practise to manage their catches, although no official quotas were put in place.

=== Convention for the Conservation of Southern Bluefin Tuna ===
In 1994, the Convention for the Conservation of Southern Bluefin Tuna formalised existing voluntary management measures between Australia, New Zealand and Japan. The Convention created the Commission for the Conservation of Southern Bluefin Tuna (CCSBT). Its objective was to ensure, through appropriate management, the conservation and optimum utilisation of the global fishery. The convention applies to southern bluefin tuna (Thunnus maccoyii) throughout its entire migratory range, rather than within a specified geographic area. South Korea, Taiwan, Indonesia and the European Union have since joined the Commission and South Africa and the Philippines are cooperating with it as non-members. The CCSBT is headquartered in Canberra, Australia.

Current quota limits were reduced in 2010 to reflect the vulnerable nature of wild stocks. Quotas for the 2010/2011 seasons were reduced to 80% of years previous. The global total allowable catch (TAC) was reduced from 11,810 tonnes from the previously allocated global TAC to 9,449 tonnes. After the quota reduction, Australia had the highest "effective catch limit" with 4,015 tonnes, followed by Japan (2,261), Republic of Korea (859), Fishing Entity of Taiwan (859), New Zealand (709), and Indonesia (651). Fishing pressure outside the allocated global TAC remains a major concern. The Australian government stated in 2006 that Japan had admitted to taking more than 100,000 tonnes over its quota over the previous 20 years.

Australia's quota bottomed out at 4,015 tonnes pa in the 2 years ending 2010/11, then increased to 4,528 tonnes in 2011/12, and 4,698 tonnes in 2012/13.

=== Total allowable catch (tonnes) ===
Country/Region	CCSBT Status	Year acceded	2010	2011	2012	2013	2014	2015	2016-2017	2018-2020
Australia	Member	1994	4,015	4,015	4,528	4,698	5,193	5,665	5,665	6,165
Japan	Member	1994					3,403	4,847	4,737	6,117
(South Korea) Republic of Korea	Member	2001					1,045	1,140	1,140	1,240.5
Taiwan	Member	2002					1,045	1,140	1,140	1,240.5
New Zealand	Member	1994					918	1,000	1,000	1,088
Indonesia	Member	2008					750	750	750	1,023
South Africa	Member	2016					40	40	40	450
European Union	Member	2015					10	10	10	11
Philippines	Co-operating non-member						45	45	45	0

The quota system increased the value of the catch. Fishermen that once earned $600 a ton selling fish to canneries began making more than $1,000 per ton of fish, selling them to buyers for the Japanese market. Quotas are expensive and are bought and sold like stocks within their national allocations.

In 2010, the Australian wild catch quota was cut, following concerns about the viability of the stock.

In 2012, Japan expressed "grave concerns" that Australian catch numbers were falsely counted. In response, Australia committed to implementing video monitoring to verify their catches. However, in 2013 Australia withdrew its commitment stating that such monitoring would impose an "excessive regulatory and financial burden".

In October 2013, the Commission for the Conservation of Southern Bluefin Tuna increased the wild catch quota to Australian tuna ranchers. The increases, staged over two years, were to take the quota to 5665 tonnes in 2015. The tuna quota rose 449 tonnes to 5147 tonnes in 2014 and then by another 518 tonnes in 2015. The quota increases were expected to allow the ranchers to increase their output by approximately 2000 tonnes per year from 2015 onwards.

Australia's reported catch has exceeded that of Japan every year since 2006.

== Recreational fishing ==
Southern bluefin tuna are targeted by recreational and game fishers in Australian waters. Allowable catch is regulated by legislation and varies from state to state.

=== Fishing competitions ===
Several fishing competitions targeting southern bluefin tuna are held annually. In 2015, the inaugural Coast 2 Coast Tuna Tournament was held in Victor Harbor. The event attracted 165 competitors and 54 boats. 164 fish were weighed in during the tournament, approaching 2500 kg of tuna in total. The average weight of the fish was 14.76 kg. 324 southern bluefin tuna were caught by 18 boats during the Riveira Port Lincoln Tuna Classic competition In April 2015. The largest fish caught during the competition weighed 13.2 kilograms.

The longest running tuna fishing competition in Australia is held annually in Tasmania by the Tuna Club of Tasmania, and was first held in 1966. Other competitions are held in Port Macdonnell, South Australia and Merimbula, New South Wales.

=== Recreational fishing regulations in Australian states ===
State	Conservation Status	Bag limit	Boat limit	Possession limit	Minimum size limit	Conditions
(South Australia) SA	None	2	6	n/a	None	Combined daily total with yellowfin tuna.
(Victoria (state)) VIC	Threatened	2	n/a	2	None	Combined daily total with yellowfin and bigeye tuna. Must have less than 160 kg in possession in any form.
(New South Wales) NSW	Endangered	1	n/a	n/a	None	
(Western Australia) WA	None	3	n/a	n/a	None	Combined daily total with other listed "large pelagic fish".
(Tasmania) TAS	None	2	4*	2	None	Combined daily total with yellowfin and bigeye tuna. Boat limit allows only 2 fish longer than 1.5 metres.

== Aquaculture ==
=== Ranching ===
The rapidly declining fishery led Australian tuna fishers to investigate the potential for augmenting their catch through aquaculture. All SBT ranching occurs offshore of Port Lincoln, South Australia; the nearby town hosting almost all of the SBT fishing companies in Australia since the 1970s. Tuna ranching commenced in 1991 and developed into the largest farmed seafood sector in Australia. The industry grew steadily, maintaining production levels of 7000 to 10,000 tonnes per annum from the mid-2000s.

Southern bluefin tuna spawn between September and April each year in the only known spawning grounds in the Indian Ocean, between the north-west Coast of Australia and Indonesia. The eggs are estimated to hatch within two to three days, and over the next two years attain sizes of approximately 15 kilograms. The principal wild catch of the Australian SBT industry is fish aged two to three years. It is believed that SBT become sexually mature between 9 and 12 years in the wild, which highlights the major negative impact of removing pre-spawning populations from the wild.

Juvenile tuna are mainly caught on the continental shelf in the Great Australian Bight region from December to around April each year, and weigh on average 15 kg (33 lb). The tuna that are located are purse seined, and then transferred through underwater panels between nets to specialised tow pontoons. They are then towed back to farm areas adjacent to Port Lincoln at a rate of about 1 knot; this process can take several weeks. Once back at the farm sites, the tuna are transferred from the tow pontoons into 40–50 m (130–160 ft) diameter farm pontoons. They are then fed bait fish (usually a range of locally caught or imported small pelagic species such as sardines) six days per week, twice per day and "grown out" for three to eight months, reaching an average of 30 to 40 kg (66–88 lb). Because SBT swim so fast and are used to migrating long distances, they are difficult to keep in small pens. Their delicate skin can be easily damaged if touched by human hands and too much handling can be fatal.

As with most aquaculture ventures, feeds are the biggest factor in the cost-efficiency of the farming operation, and there would be considerable advantages in using formulated pellet feed to supplement or replace the baitfish. However, as yet the manufactured feeds are not competitive with the baitfish. A further future prospect in enhancing the ranching of SBT is the plan of Long Term Holding. By holding its fish for two successive growing seasons (18 months) instead of one (up to 8 months), the industry could potentially achieve a major increase in volume, greater production from the limited quota of wild-caught juveniles, and ability to serve the market year round. This presents several uncertainties, and is still in the planning stage.

Around April, harvest begins and fish are gently guided into a boat (any bruising lowers the price) where they are killed, flash frozen and most placed on Tokyo-bound planes. Armed guards are paid to watch over them as 2,000 tuna kept in a single pen are worth around $2 million. Australia exports 10,000 metric tons of southern bluefin tuna worth $200 million; almost all is from ranched stocks.

The southern bluefin tuna ranching industry is worth between 200 and 300 million Australian dollars annually to the economy of South Australia. The industry's value peaked in 2004 at $290 million, according to industry representative, Brian Jeffriess. In 2014, following an increase in Australia catch quota and emerging export opportunities to China, the sector anticipated an annual turnover of $165 million.

The capture and transportation of southern bluefin tuna to aquaculture pens near Port Lincoln is shown in the 2007 documentary film Tuna Wranglers.

=== Feeds ===
Scientists have tried and continue to try to develop less expensive fish feed. One of main obstacles is creating a processed food that doesn't affect the taste of the tuna. Southern bluefin tuna are largely fed fresh or frozen small pelagic fishes (including Sardinops sagax) and the use of formulated pellets is not yet viable. This cost is largely due to the expense of dietary research. The annual costs of diet for research alone is approximately US$100,000 and there are additional problems associated with working with large, fast-swimming marine animals. Farm-raised tuna generally have a higher fat content than wild tuna. A one-metre tuna needs about 15 kg (33 lb) of live fish to gain 1 kg (2 lb) of fat, and about 1.5 to 2 tonnes of squid and mackerel are needed to produce a 100 kg (220 lb) bluefin tuna. Research evaluating ingredients for use in southern bluefin tuna feed is ongoing, and gathering information on ingredient digestibility, palatability and nutrient utilisation and interference can improve lower costs for tuna ranchers.

=== Dietary supplements ===
The use of dietary supplements can improve the shelf life of farmed SBT flesh. Results of a study by SARDI (South Australian Research and Development Institute) indicated that feeding a diet approximately 10 times higher in dietary antioxidants raised levels of vitamin E and vitamin C, but not selenium, in tuna flesh and increased the shelf life of tuna. This is important as the frozen baitfish diets are likely to be lower in antioxidant vitamins than the wild tuna diet.

=== Parasites and pathology ===
The risk of parasite and disease spreading for southern bluefin aquaculture is low to negligible; the modern SBT aquaculture industry has total catch to harvest mortalities of around 2-4%. A diverse range of parasite species has been found hosted by the southern bluefin tuna, with most of the parasites examined posing little or no risk to the health of the farms—with some southern bluefin actually showing antibody responses to epizootics—however, blood fluke and gill fluke have the greatest risk factors. Hypoxia is also a significant issue, and can be escalated due to unforeseen environmental factors such as algal blooms.

=== Complete aquaculture ===
Initially, difficulties in closing the life cycle of the species dissuaded most from farming them. However, in 2007, using hormonal therapy developed in Europe and Japan (where they had already succeeded in breeding northern Pacific bluefin tuna to third generation) to mimic the natural production of hormones by wild fish, researchers in Australia managed for the first time to trigger spawning in landlocked tanks. This was done by the Australian aquaculture company, Clean Seas Tuna Limited. who collected its first batch of fertilized eggs from a breeding stock of about 20 tuna weighing 160 kg (350 lb). They were also the first company in the world to successfully transfer large SBT over large distances to its onshore facilities in Arno Bay which is where the spawning has taken place. This led Time magazine to award it second place in the 'World's Best Invention' of 2009.

The state-of-the-art Arno Bay hatchery was purchased in 2000, and undertook a $2.5 million upgrade, where initial broodstock facilities catered for kingfish (Seriola lalandi) and mulloway (Argyrosomus japonicas), along with a live-feed production plant. This facility has more recently been upgraded to a $6.5 million special purpose SBT larval rearing recirculation facility. During the most recent summer (2009/2010), the company completed its third consecutive annual on-shore southern bluefin tuna spawning program, having doubled the controlled spawning period to three months at its Arno Bay facility. Fingerlings are now up to 40 days old with the grow-out program, and the spawning period has been extended from 6 weeks to 12, but as yet, grow-out of commercial quantities of SBT fingerlings has been unsuccessful. Whilst aquaculture pioneers Clean Seas Limited have not been able to grow out commercial quantities of SBT fingerlings from this season's trials, the SBT broodstock were wintered and conditioned for the 2010-11 summer production run.

With collaboration secured with international researchers, in particular with Kinki University in Japan, commercial viability was hoped to be achieved.

However, after experiencing financial difficulty, the board of Clean Seas decided during December 2012 to defer its tuna propagation research and write-off the value of the intellectual property it developed as part of its research into SBT propagation. According to the chairman and chief executive's report for the financial year ending 30 June 2013, the production of SBT juveniles had been slower and more difficult than anticipated. Clean Seas will maintain its broodstock to enable discrete research in the future, however they do not expect commercial production to be achieved over the short to medium term.

Clean Seas' attempts to close the life cycle of the species appear in the 2012 documentary film Sushi: The Global Catch. At the time of filming, Clean Seas' director Hagen Stehr was optimistic having experienced early success.

== Human consumption ==
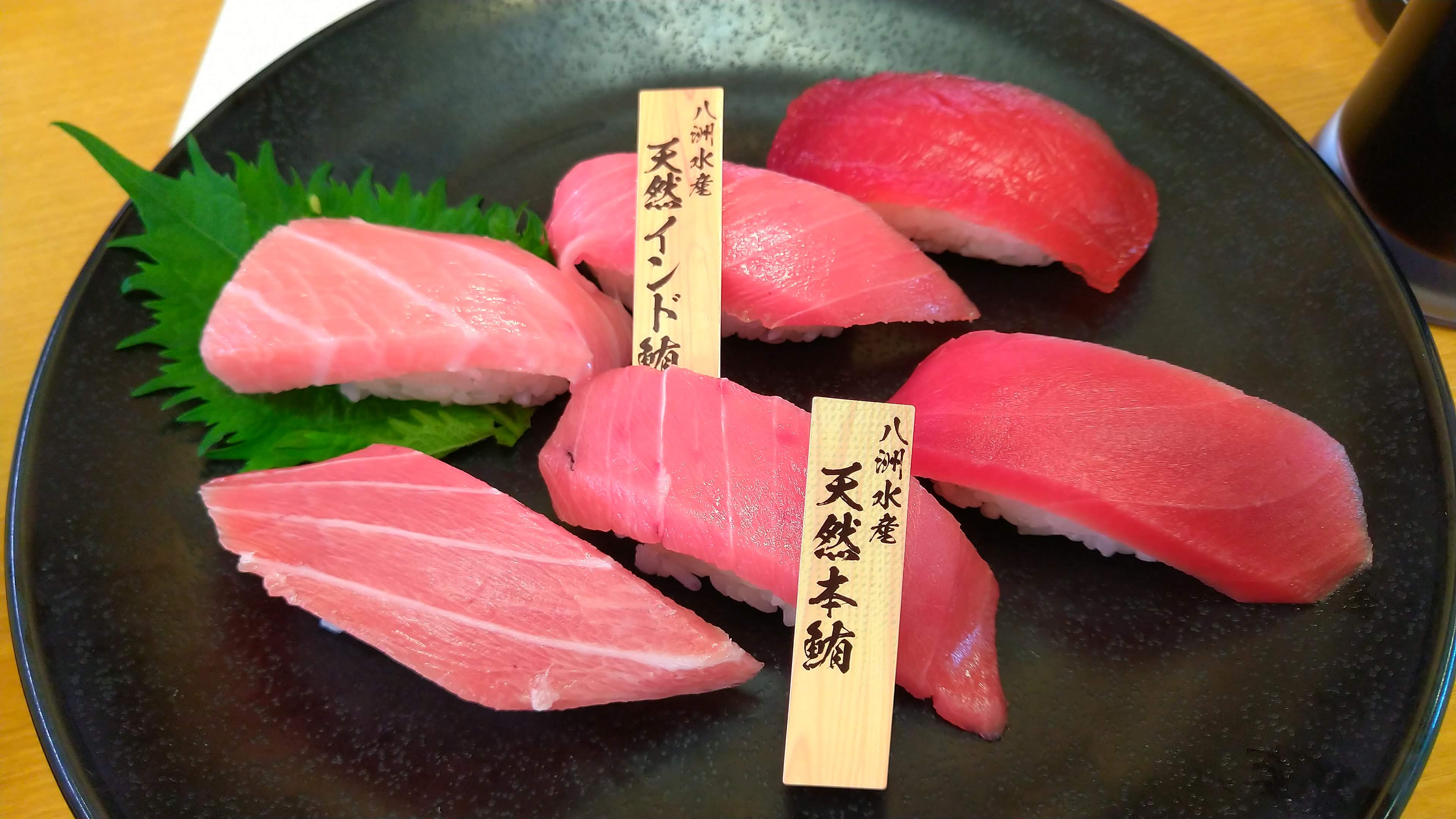
Sushi made of southern bluefin tuna (top row) and pacific bluefin tuna (bottom row)

Southern bluefin tuna is a gourmet food, which is in demand for use in sashimi and sushi. It has medium flavoured flesh.

By far the largest consumer of SBT is Japan, with USA coming in second, followed by China. Japanese imports of fresh bluefin tuna (all 3 species) worldwide increased from 957 tons in 1984 to 5,235 tons in 1993. The price peaked in 1990 at $34 per kilogram when a typical 350 pound fish sold for around $10,000. As of 2008, bluefin was selling for $23 a kilogram. The drop in value was due to the drop in the Japanese market, an increase in supply from northern bluefin tuna from the Mediterranean, and more and more tuna being stored (tuna frozen with the special "flash" method can be kept for up to a year with no perceivable change in taste).

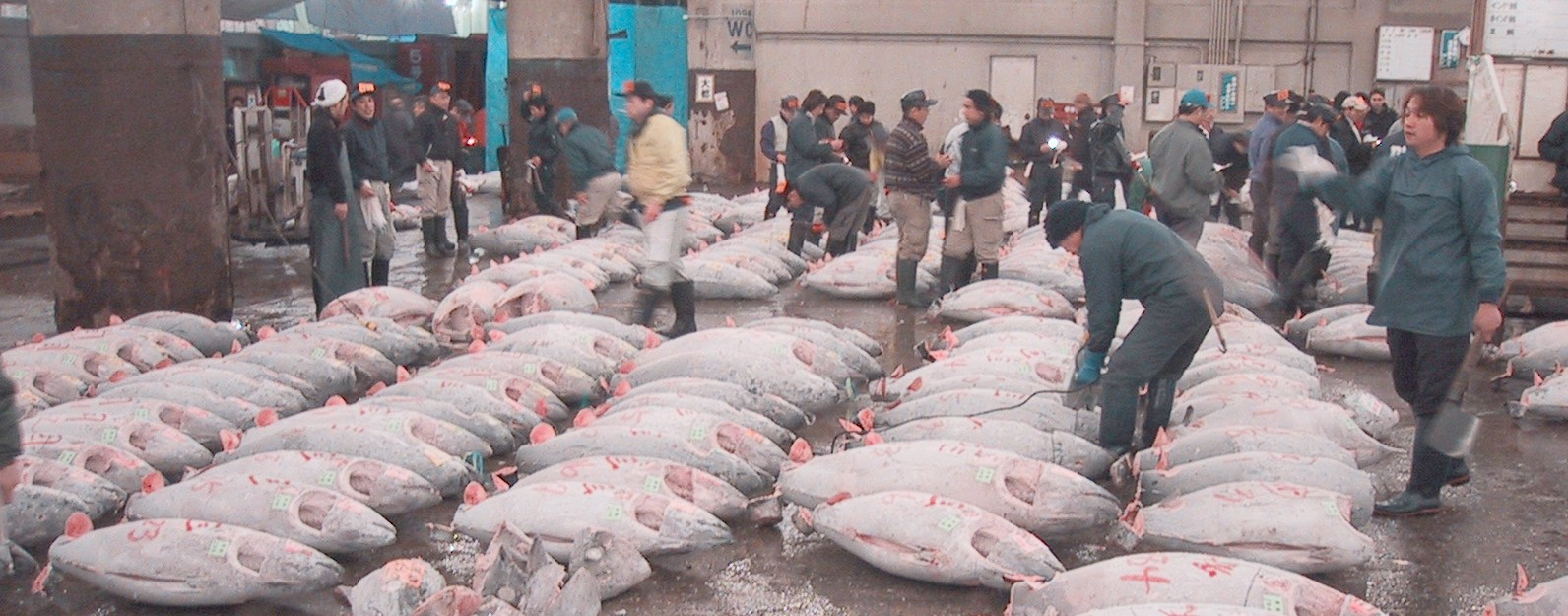
Frozen tuna at the Tsukiji fish market.

The Tsukiji fish market in Tokyo is the largest wholesale market of SBT in the world. Tsukiji handles more than 2,400 tons of fish, worth about US$20 million, a day, with pre-dawn auctions of tuna being the main feature. No tourists are allowed to enter the tuna wholesale areas, which they say is for purposes of sanitation and disruption to the auction process. Higher prices are charged for the highest quality fish; bluefin tuna worth over $150,000 have been sold at Tsukiji. In 2001, a 202-kilogram wild Pacific bluefin tuna caught in Tsugaru Straight near Omanachi I Aomori Prefecture sold for $173,600, or about $800 a kilogram. In 2013, a 222-kilogram Pacific bluefin tuna was sold at Tsukiji for $1.8 million, or about $8,000 per kilogram.

== Conservation ==
The southern bluefin tuna is classified as an endangered species on the IUCN Red List of Threatened species. It had been reclassified from Critically Endangered in September 2021. As of 2020, the current mean population estimate is 13% of unfished levels. Its stock status remains "overfished", though it is not currently subjected to overfishing.

In Australia, the southern bluefin tuna is listed as Conservation Dependent under the EPBC Act. This listing allows for the commercial exploitation of the species, despite their accepted global status as an over-fished species. The species is listed as Endangered under the Fisheries Management Act 1994 (New South Wales) and as Threatened under the Flora and Fauna Guarantee Act 1988 (Victoria). Recreational fishing targeting southern bluefin tuna is permitted in all states and territories and is regulated by various combinations of bag, boat and possession limits.

In 2010, Greenpeace International added the SBT to its seafood red list. It is a list of fish that are commonly sold in supermarkets around the world which Greenpeace believes have a very high risk of being sourced from unsustainable fisheries. Other environmental organisations have challenged the sustainability of southern bluefin tuna fishing and ranching including the Australian Marine Conservation Society, Sea Shepherd and the Conservation Council of South Australia.

Attempts to establish or expand tuna ranching in waters close to the Sir Joseph Banks group, Kangaroo Island, Louth Bay and Granite Island have been met with public opposition on environmental grounds. Successful court challenges and appeals of planning decisions have occurred in association with plans near the Sir Joseph Banks group and Louth Bay.

== Environmental impacts ==
Feed conversion ratios (feed input to tuna weight gain) of approximately 15:1 or higher result in significant feed requirements for captive southern bluefin tuna and resultant nutrient pollution. The feed conversion ratio is a consequence of the fish's carnivorous diet and the high metabolic costs of the species. Removing tuna from the wild before they have reached sexual maturity also affects wild populations. Clean Seas has attempted to address this by focusing research effort on closing the life-cycle of the species with the potential benefit of alleviating some of the fishing pressure on declining stocks, but has not succeeded.

In 2016, South Australia's southern bluefin tuna ranching industry received a Sustainability Certificate from Friend of the Sea. Industry spokesperson Brian Jeffriess said of the certification: "This is one of the few awards to actually cover both the wild fish catching and the whole farming supply chain and within that labour standards, crew safety, traceability, carbon footprint... every conceivable sustainability test."

=== Pollution ===
Tuna farms are point sources of solid waste onto to the benthos and dissolved nutrients into the water column. Most farms are more than a kilometre off the coast, thus the deeper water and significant currents alleviate some of the impact on the benthos. Due to the high metabolic rates of SBT, low retention rates of nitrogen in tissue is seen, and there are high environmental leaching of nutrients (86-92%).

Ranching of southern bluefin tuna is the largest contributor of industrial nutrient pollution to Spencer Gulf's marine environment. The industry contributes 1,946 tonnes per annum, distributed across Boston Bay & Lincoln Offshore aquaculture zones. Kingfish aquaculture is the region's next largest nutrient polluter (734 tonnes per annum) but is distributed across a larger area which includes Port Lincoln, Arno Bay, Port Neill and Fitzgerald Bay (near Whyalla). These combined nutrient inputs are ecologically significant, as Spencer Gulf is an inverse estuary and a naturally low-nutrient environment. Wastewater treatment plants from the region's largest settlements at Port Augusta, Port Lincoln, Port Pirie and Whyalla contribute a combined total of 54 tonnes of nitrogenous nutrient to Spencer Gulf.

Other polluting processes include the use of chemicals on the farms, which leach into the surrounding environment. These include anti-foulants to keep the cages free from colonial algae and animals, and therapeutants to deal with disease and parasitism. Toxicants, such as mercury and PCBs (polychlorinated biphenyls), can build up over time, particularly through the tuna feed, with some evidence of contaminants being more elevated in farmed fish than in wild stocks.

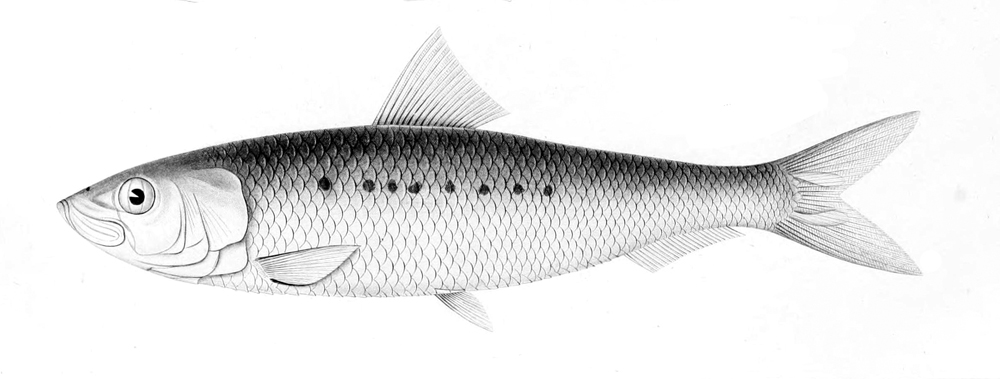
Sardinops sagax

=== Sardine fishery ===
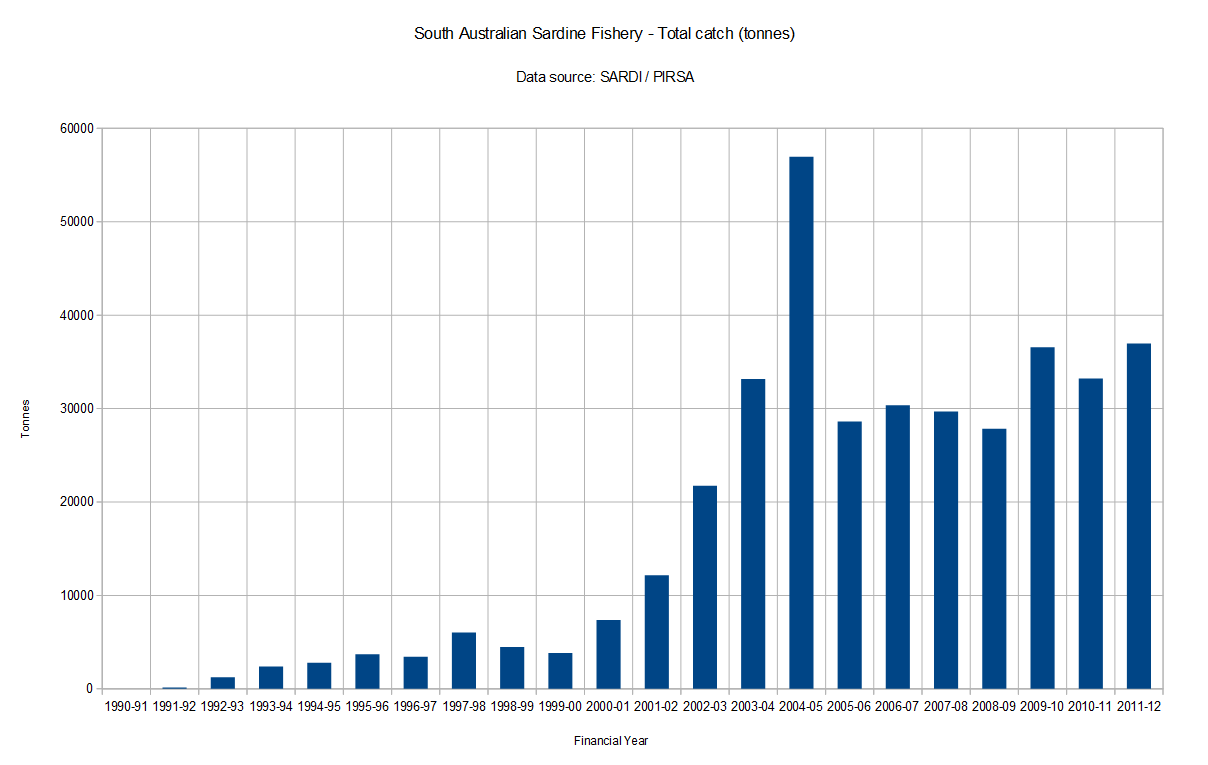
South Australian sardine fishery - Total catch (1990-2012)

Australia's largest single species fishery (by volume) has been developed since 1991 to provide feedstock for the southern bluefin tuna farming industry. Catches in the fishery increased from 3,241 tonnes in 1994 to 42,475 tonnes in 2005. According to the South Australian Sardine Industry Association, 94% of its annual catch is utilized as feedstock for farmed SBT, with the remainder used for human consumption, recreational fishing bait and premium pet food. Fishing effort is largely concentrated in southern Spencer Gulf and Investigator Strait near Kangaroo Island in South Australian state waters. Some fishing also occurs off the Coffin Bay Peninsula in the Great Australian Bight.

Reduced availability of baitfish species is known to affect seabird populations. In 2005, the potential impact of this fishery upon colonies of little penguins was considered a future research priority, due to the relative paucity of alternative prey species. As of 2014, no such studies have been undertaken.

The fishery uses large purse seine nets up to 1 km in length to catch sardines. Bycatch mortalities of the fishery include the common dolphin (Delphinus delphis) which is a protected species under state and federal legislation. The species is protected federally under the Environment Protection Biodiversity & Conservation Act.

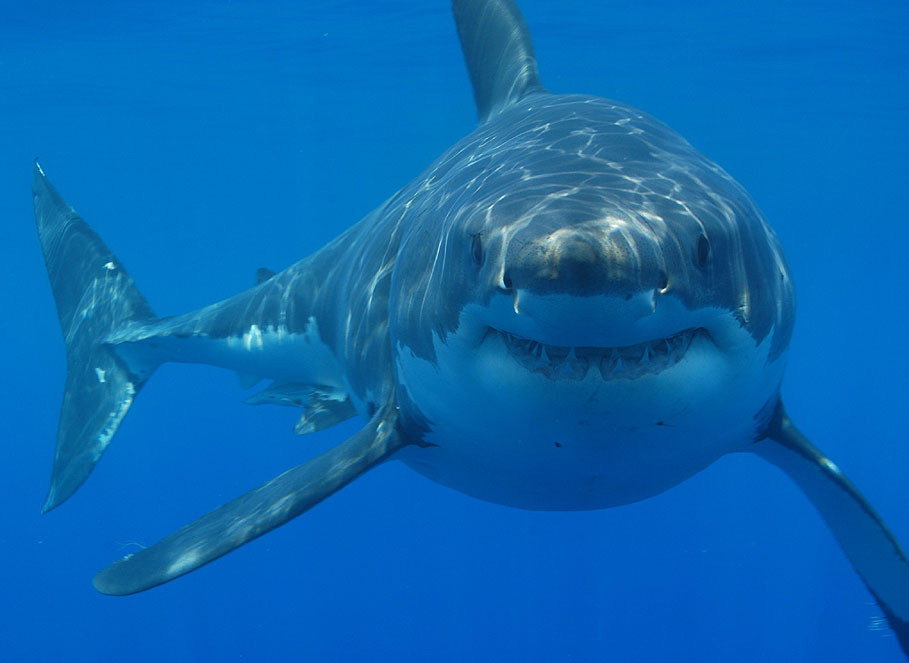
Great white shark

=== Interactions with sharks ===
Tuna cages attract sharks, which are drawn to fish which sometimes die in the pens and settle in the bottoms of the floating nets. Inquisitive sharks may bite holes in nets and enter the cages or become entangled in the nets and subsequently become distressed or drown. In response, employees of tuna ranching operations will either enter the water and attempt to wrestle the sharks out of the pens, or kill the shark. Species known to interact with southern bluefin tuna operations include hammerhead sharks, bronze whalers and great white sharks. The latter species is protected under federal Australian legislation while the former two are not. Some of these interactions are shown in the documentary film, Tuna Wranglers (2007).

In South Australia prior to 2001 there were nine recorded deaths of great white sharks in tuna pens during a five-year period. Six of the animals were killed and the remaining three were found already deceased. Some successful releases have also occurred since, though official records of mortality and releases are not available to the public and some incidents are likely to have gone unreported.

=== Compatibility with Marine Parks ===
When State Government managed Marine Parks were proclaimed in South Australia in 2009, a "whole of Government" commitment was made to prevent adverse impacts to the aquaculture sector. This included the preservation of existing aquaculture operations and zones. A further commitment was made to allow for the expansion of aquaculture within South Australian marine park boundaries. The commitment states that "DENR and PIRSA Aquaculture have identified areas that may support marine parks through appropriate mechanisms." An example of a pilot lease being issued within a marine park exists in the Encounter Marine Park, where Oceanic Victor received approval to establish a pen containing southern bluefin tuna for tourism purposes in 2015. In this case, the lease has been issued within a Habitat Protection Zone.

== Film and television ==
The southern bluefin tuna industry has been the subject of several documentary films, including Tuna Cowboys (circa 2003) and Tuna Wranglers (2007), which were produced by NHNZ for National Geographic and Discovery Channel respectively. Some historical fishing footage and the process of harvesting the fish are shown in Port Lincoln home of the bluefin tuna (circa 2007) produced by Phil Sexton. Clean Seas' attempts to close the life cycle of the southern bluefin tuna feature in Sushi: The Global Catch (2012). In 2019, fisherman Al McGlashan produced the documentary Life on the Line - The Story of the Southern Bluefin Tuna with $145,000 funding from the Australian Government via the Australian Fisheries Management Authority and the Fisheries Research and Development Corporation.
