= Super trawlers in Australia =

Super trawlers in Australia may refer to: -

- Seafish Tasmania

or individual ships: -

- Naeraberg, named FV Geelong Star while in Australia
- FV_Margiris, named Abel Tasman while in Australia
