= Huon Aquaculture =

Salmon-producing company in Tasmania, Australia

Huon Aquaculture Limited
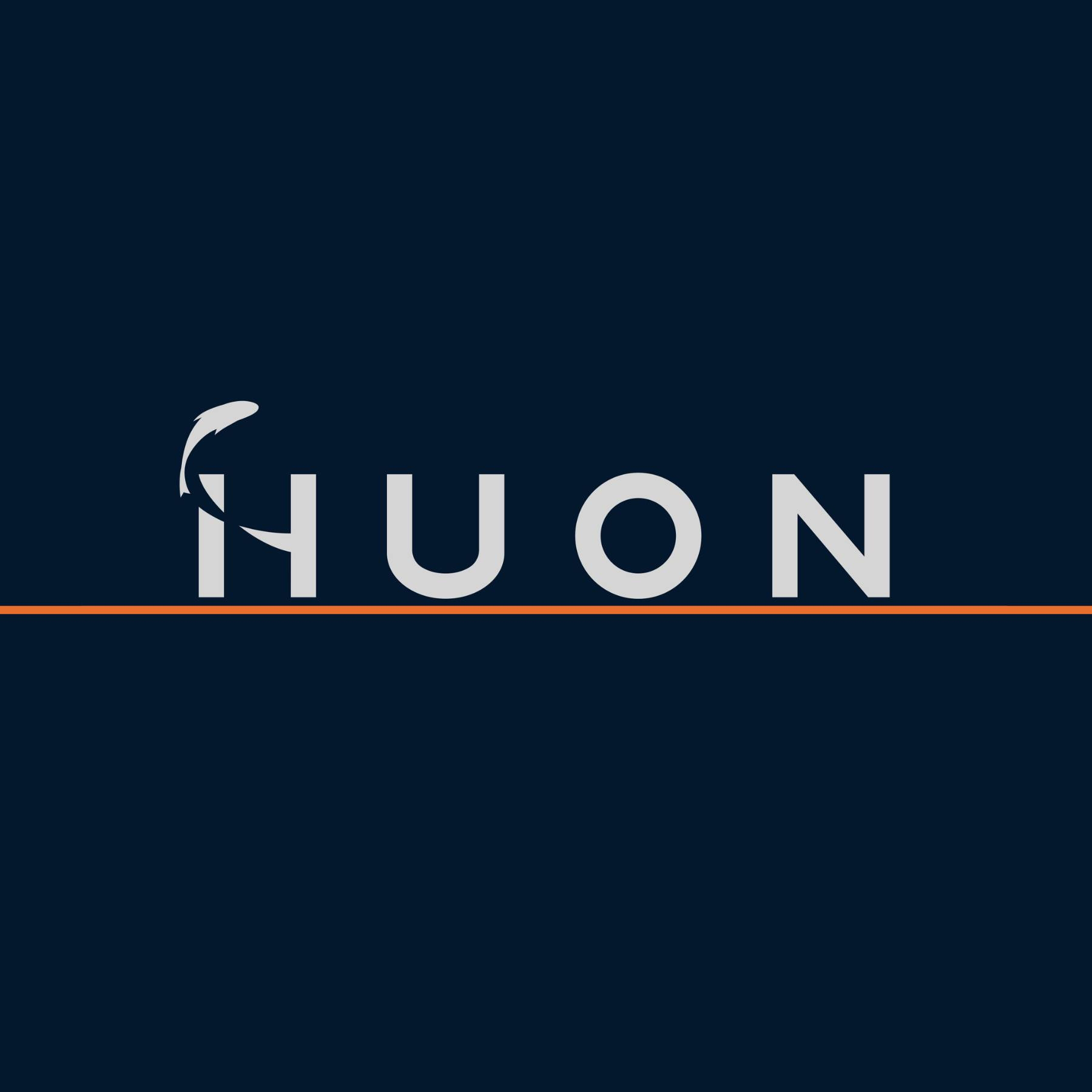
- Type: Subsidiary company
- Industry: Food processing, fishing
- Founded: 1986
- Headquarters: Dover, Tasmania, Australia
- Area served: Australia, New Zealand, Asia
- Products: Processed salmon products
- Number of employees: 700
- Parent: JBS S.A.
- Website: www.huonaqua.com.au

Huon Aquaculture is a large aquaculture and food processing enterprise located in Tasmania, Australia. Founded in 1986, Huon has grown to become the second largest salmon producer in the state, after ASX-listed Tassal; it employs 487 Tasmanians and produces 25,000 tonnes of salmon annually. It became a subsidiary of the Brazilian meat processing company JBS S.A. in November 2021.

Huon operates fish pens in Storm Bay, off Bruny Island, Macquarie Harbour, near Strahan, and Hideaway Bay, near Dover, a fish processing, packing and value-added facility in Parramatta Creek, Tasmania.

In 2020, Huon Aquaculture was convicted of environmental breaches in regard to its operations at Whale Point and fined $40,000.

2026 failures include https://tasgreensmps.org/media-releases/2-7-tonnes-of-florfenicol-dumped-at-one-salmon-lease/

As of 2021, Huon has additional assets in Western Australia including a processing facility in Perth and a 2,200 hectare lease in the Mid West aquaculture zone.

It was a majority family and employee owned company listed on the Australian Securities Exchange, but was acquired by Brazilian multinational JBS in November 2021.

== See also ==
- Seafood in Australia
