= Brian Jeffriess =

Australian bluefin tuna industry spokesman

Brian Jeffriess AM
- Occupation: Industry spokesperson

Brian Jeffriess AM is the primary spokesperson for Australia's Southern bluefin tuna fishing and aquaculture industry. He lives in Port Lincoln, South Australia and is the chief executive for the Australian Southern Bluefin Tuna Industry Association (formerly known as the Tuna Boat Owners Association). He is a current member of the Australian Maritime and Fisheries Academy, the Commonwealth Fisheries Association, the Aquaculture Advisory Committee and the Fisheries and Aquaculture Research Advisory Committee. Jeffriess features regularly in the Port Lincoln Times newspaper, where he relates the industry's activities and interests to his local community. He attends the international Commission for the Conservation of Southern Bluefin Tuna meetings and works closely with industry and government. On 26 January 2012 Jeffriess was awarded Member of the Order of Australia "for service to the fishing and aquaculture industries as a contributor to the sustainable management and harvesting of Australian fisheries and through national and international professional associations." He has also been awarded State and National Seafood Icon status.

== Career ==
Jeffriess has been the industry spokesperson for tuna aquaculture in South Australia since it began in 1993. In 2001, he spoke of the Japanese desire to "supply the Japanese consumer at a reasonable price with high-quality sashimi." Japan's Overseas Fishery Cooperation Foundation sent two operatives to Port Lincoln to help establish the industry. Since that time, the industry has captured young fish in the wild and transferred them to pens in Boston Bay and Spencer Gulf, where they are fattened up for market. They are then harvested, chilled and exported to Japan by plane. The same year, Jefferiess expressed concern that his town of Port Lincoln would suffer if the industry collapsed, saying, "I find this scary. I wake up every morning and think 'How do you sustain this?"'

Jeffriess is a former chairman of the National Fishing Industry Council and Australian Seafood Industry Council and represents the tuna industry in the Spencer Gulf Ecosystem and Development Initiative, which was initiated by the Environment Institute at the University of Adelaide. Jeffriess has served on a variety of high-level committees, including the Australian Fisheries Management Authority (2001-2008), many fishery commissions, the FRDC Board, various subprograms and import/export committees. He has extensive fisheries and aquaculture experience spanning across industries from Australia's cold temperate ocean to the tropical north.

Jefferiess has an economics degree and professional experience in business management and as a chief political advisor.

== Politics ==
Jeffriess has expressed his opinions to the media on a range of marine matters relevant to the southern bluefin tuna industry, the aquaculture sector, and fisheries management.

=== Tuna fishing ===
As of 2015, Jeffriess believes that the southern bluefin tuna stocks are being adequately managed, and welcomed increases to the Australian catch quota in 2014 and 2015 seasons. He has acknowledged that concerns expressed by others regarding the viability of the stock circa 2010 were valid.

=== Great white sharks ===
In 1995, Jeffriess told The Australian that "due to the biology of this species, a sustainable fishery for the Great White is not possible." He was speaking as chairman of the Australian Seafood Industry Council at the time, and pressure was increasing to provide legislative protection to the species. As of 2015, Jeffriess maintains a moderate attitude in public towards great white sharks. In response to a CSIRO publication, he expressed his belief in a civic responsibility "to inform the community scientifically and rationally on numbers of whites and other sharks – and let the community make up their own minds on risks."

=== New Zealand fur seals ===
Jeffriess has supported the need to research and manage New Zealand fur seal populations in South Australia and has described them as a major problem for tuna ranchers.

"They are the largest cause of tuna deaths in the pontoons and (they) frighten the other tuna, so they do not eat for days."

=== Supertrawler FV Margiris ===
Mr Jeffriess told the media that the tuna industry association's view was that bigger boats (like the FV Margiris) catching the quota of small pelagic fish quicker would cause less environmental impact than a large number of smaller boats fishing for longer, closer to shore. Jeffriess said there were already much bigger boats in Australian waters, including trawl boats that stayed at sea longer than the Margiris and with much bigger nets. He said the issue for Port Lincoln was to ensure that the FV Margiris didn't interact with the sardine fishery, and an agreement had been reached. On the decision to temporarily ban the FV Margiris from Australian waters, Jeffriess commented:

"The minister had the right to make a political decision, and that is what he did."

Jeffriess' support for the supertrawler FV Margiris attracted commentary by the animal rights organisation, Animals Australia. The organisation drew attention to the industry's dependency on small pelagic fish to feed the tuna and pointed to its potential to impact other species such as the little penguin.
