= Parlevliet & van der Plas =

International fisheries company

- Industry: Fisheries
- Founders: Dirk Parlevliet; Jan van der Plas; Dirk van der Plas
- Headquarters: Valkenburg, South Holland, Netherlands
- Area served: Worldwide
- Key people: Dirk Parlevliet; Jan van der Plas; Dirk van der Plas
- Production output: 300,000 tonnes (2008)
- Revenue: $500 million to $1 billion (USD) per year
- Number of employees: 6,000
- Parent: Rederij Samenwerking I B.V.
- Subsidiaries: UK Fisheries Limited; Compagnie Francaise Du Thon Oceanique; Boekenroode; Heiploeg International B.V. Ouwehand Visverwerking B.V., Absolutely Genuine - Unipessoal Lda
- Website: http://parlevliet-vanderplas.nl/

Parlevliet & van der Plas is a privately owned international fisheries company based in the Netherlands, founded in 1949 by Dirk Parlevliet and brothers Dirk and Jan van der Plas.

The company began by purchasing herring at auctions for resale, eventually expanding into operating a large fleet of fishing trawlers operating globally. They are exporters of seafood to Africa and suppliers of fish for zoos.

Parlevliet & van der Plas is certified by the Marine Stewardship Council.

The company operates a 6500 m^{2} freezing store on Faroe Islands, Denmark.

In 2018 P & V bought the German company Deutsche See.

== Spread of operations ==
The firm regularly enters into other fisheries through acquisitions.

Regular acquisitions with partners make the spread of the company extensive, across different fisheries in the world.

== Criticisms ==
In 2013, Greenpeace lodged a legal complaint against Parlevliet & van der Plas for the alleged dumping of 1.5 million kg of fish into the ocean. Allegations of Greenpeace have been withdrawn after the key witness turned out to have given a false statement.

In 2012 and 2015 the firm introduced Super trawlers into Australian waters, utilising the Tasmanian firm Seafish Tasmania. The presence of the trawlers in Australian waters provoked widespread criticism of Seafish Tasmania, and Parlevliet & van der Plas.

== Fleet ==
=== Pelagic ===
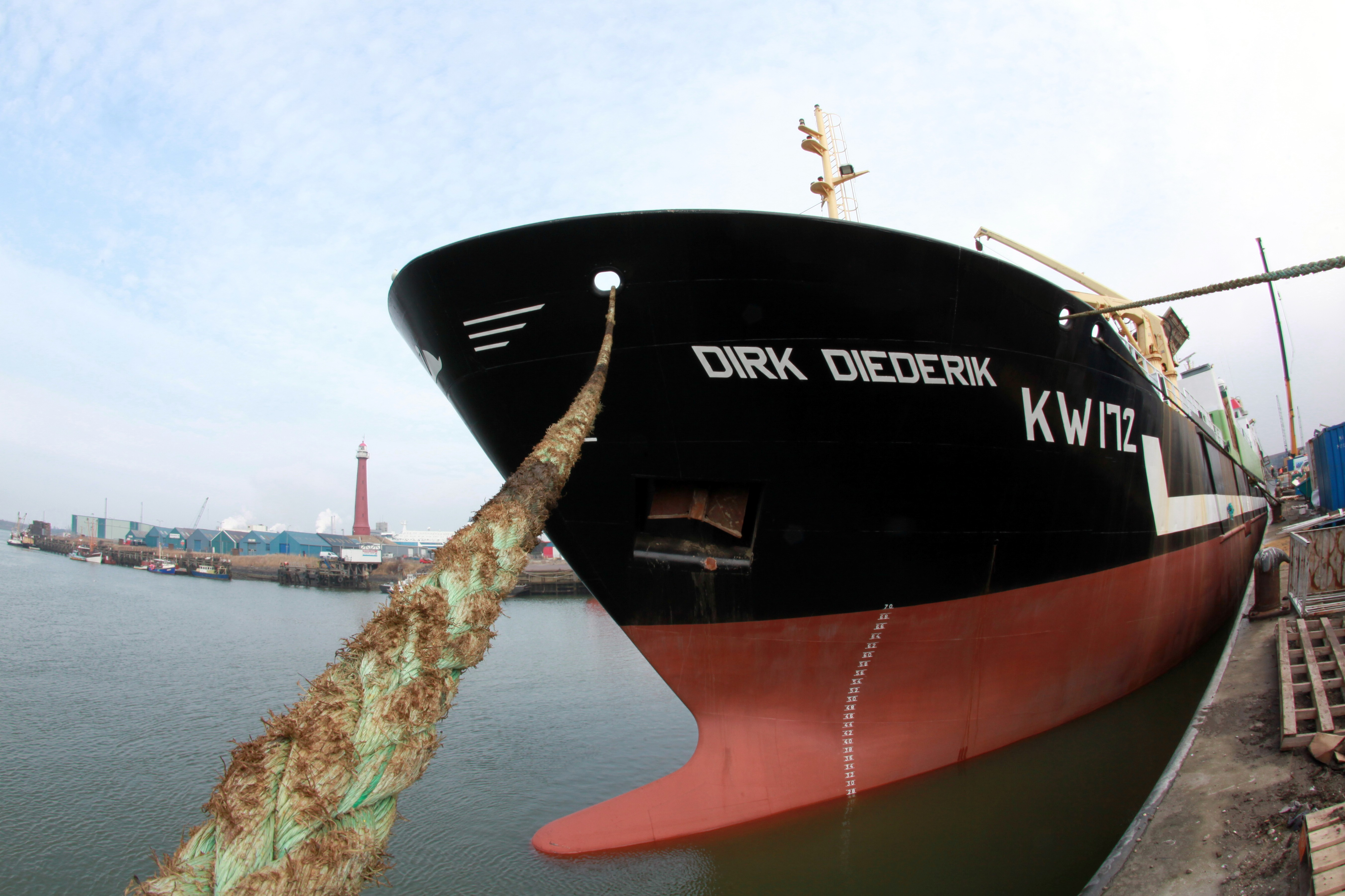
The Dirk Diederik KW 172, renamed FV Geelong Star during its time in Australia.

- Annelies Ilena (KW174)
- Alina (GDY-346)
- Helen Mary (ROS 785)
- Maartje Theadora (ROS 171)
- Margiris (KL855)
- Dirk-Dirk (KW 172)
- Naeraberg (KG14)

=== Demersal ===
- Andre Leduc (BL 924680)
- Bressay Bank Pair TR (BL 900470)
- Harvest Cap Nord (BL 734 690)
- Cap Saint Georges (BL 924675)
- Dorado (LVL 2133)
- Farnella (H 135)
- Emeraude (SM 934017)
- Klondyke 139 (BL 735220)
- Mark (ROS 777)
- Jan Maria (BX792)
- Ocean Tiger (R 38)
- Kirkella (2HF18)
- Lodairo (3*VI-5-1-18)
- Gerda Maria (ROS786) (Ship for sale for US$5,000,000 or try offer as 2024)
