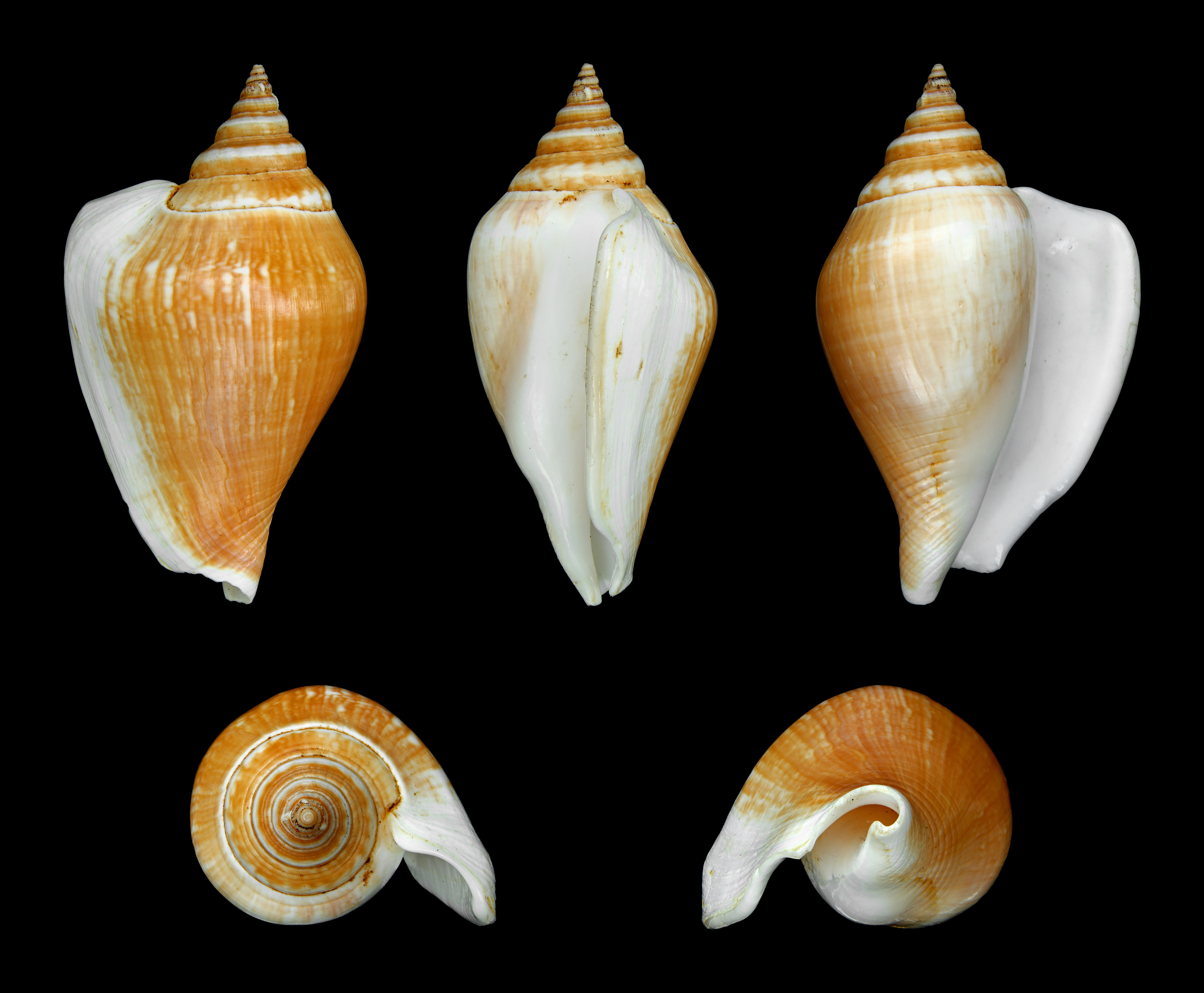
- Five different views of a shell of an adult Laevistrombus turturella: abapertural (upper left), right lateral (center), apertural (upper right), apical (lower left) and basal (lower right)
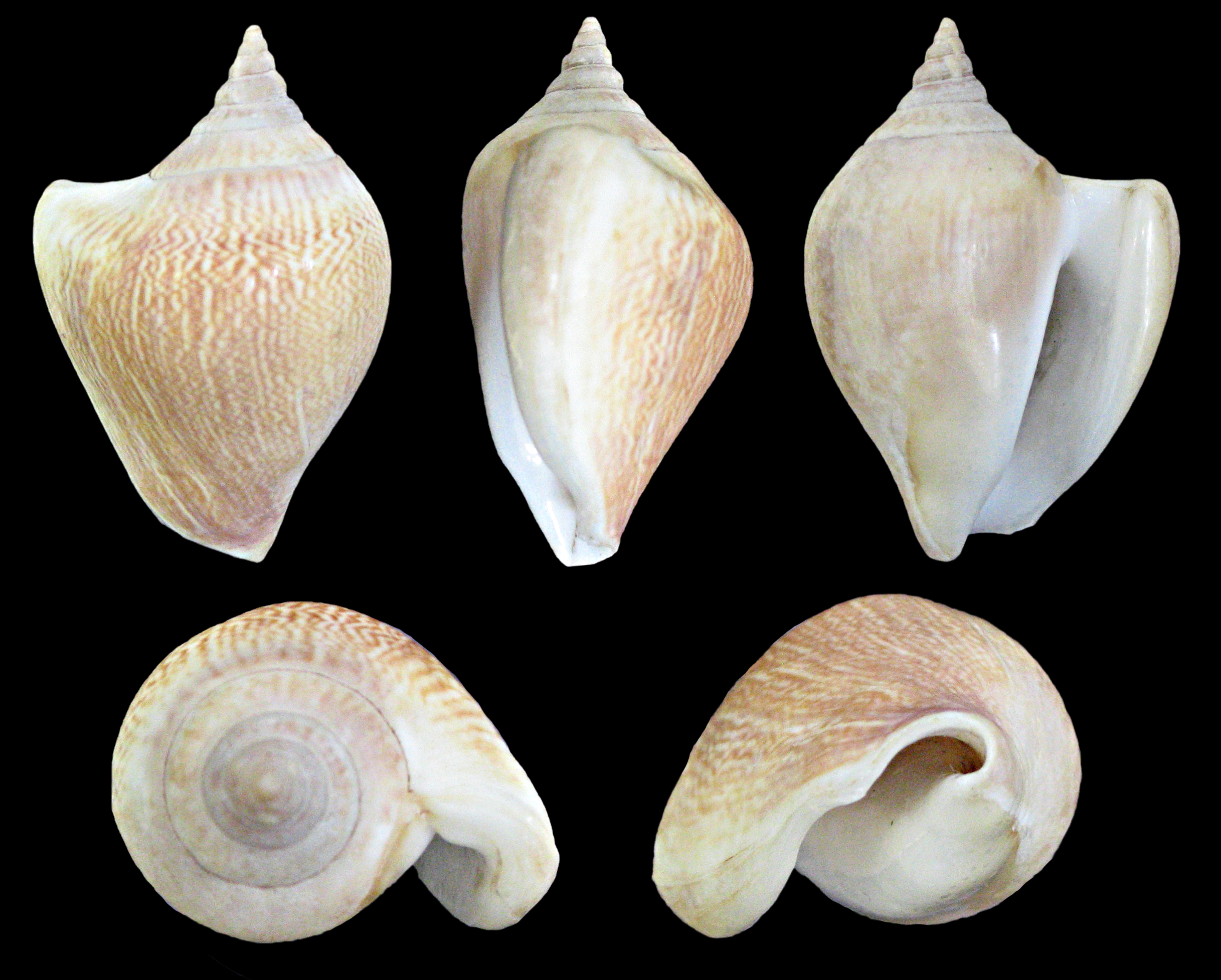
- Five different views of a shell of an adult Laevistrombus canarium

Scientific classification
- Kingdom: Animalia
- Phylum: Mollusca
- Class: Gastropoda
- Subclass: Caenogastropoda
- Order: Littorinimorpha
- Superfamily: Stromboidea
- Family: Strombidae
- Genus: Laevistrombus; Abbott, 1960

Type species
- Strombus canarium Linnaeus, 1758

Synonyms
- Strombus (Laevistrombus) Abbott, 1960 (original rank)

= Laevistrombus =

Laevistrombus Temporal range: Tertiary–Recent

Genus of gastropods

Laevistrombus is a genus of sea snails, marine gastropod mollusks in the family Strombidae, the true conchs.

== History ==
The taxon Laevistrombus was introduced in the literature as a subgenus of Strombus by Tetsuaki Kira (1955) in the third printing of the 1st edition of Coloured Illustrations of the Shells of Japan. It comprised two species, Strombus (Laevistrombus) canarium and Strombus (L.) isabella Lamarck, 1822. No type specimen was designated, and Kira gave no formal description or statement of differentiation, as required by the ICZN code to validate the name. In a later version of the book, Laevistrombus was elevated to genus level, but a description was still lacking. Rüdiger Bieler and Richard Petit (1996) considered it a nomen nudum, and the authorship was transferred to Robert Tucker Abbott (1960), who had provided a proper description and illustrations of Laevistrombus and specified a type species, Strombus canarium L., in the first volume of his monograph Indo-Pacific Mollusca. The currently accepted classification was proposed by Sepkoski (2002), who elevated Laevistrombus to genus level based on palaeontological data.

== Species ==
Living species within the genus Laevistrombus include:

- Laevistrombus canarium (Linnaeus, 1758)
- † Laevistrombus denticostatus (G. F. Harris, 1897)
- Laevistrombus guidoi (Man in 't Veld & De Turck, 1998)
- Laevistrombus liveranii Dekkers, Rymer & S. J. Maxwell, 2021
- Laevistrombus maxwelli Gra-tes, 2022

Synonyms

- Laevistrombus taeniatus (Quoy & Gaimard, 1834): synonym of Dolomena taeniata (Quoy & Gaimard, 1834) (superseded combination)
- Laevistrombus turturella (Röding, 1798): synonym of Dolomena turturella (Röding, 1798) (superseded combination)
- Laevistrombus vanikorensis (Quoy & Gaimard, 1834): synonym of Dolomena vanikorensis (Quoy & Gaimard, 1834) (superseded combination)
