= Cape Gloucester =

Cape Gloucester may refer to:

- Cape Gloucester, Queensland, a locality in the Whitsunday Region, Queensland, Australia
- Cape Gloucester (Papua New Guinea), a headland in Papua New Guinea
