= Aquaculture in Australia =

On a steady increase since 1970 accounting for 34% of seafood

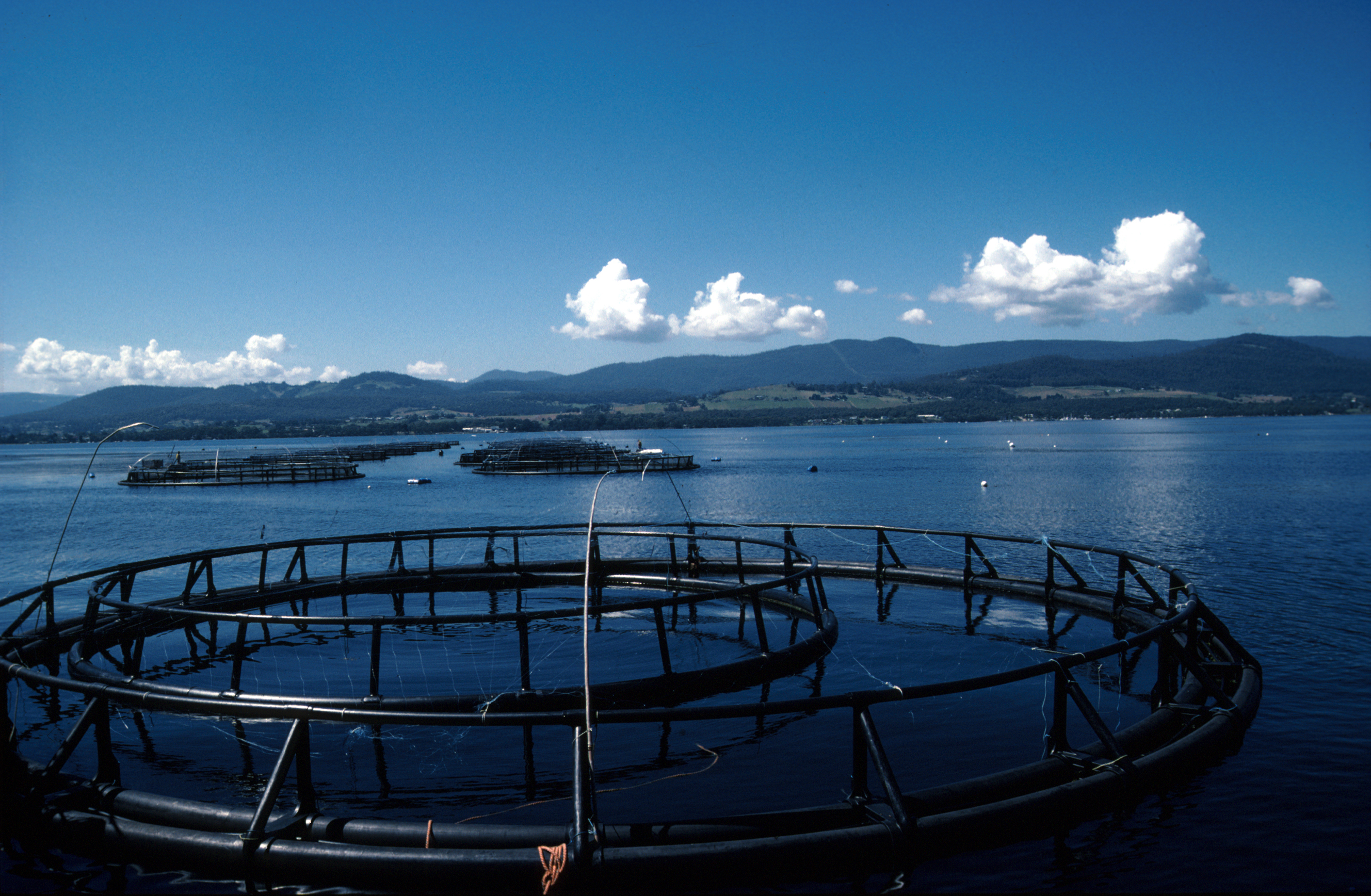
CSIRO Salmon cages. Australia's aquaculture industry has an annual value of more than $600 million and is expanding at the rate of 20% per year.

Aquaculture in Australia is the country's fastest-growing primary industry, accounting for 34% of the total gross value of production of seafood. 10 species of fish are farmed in Australia, and production is dominated by southern bluefin tuna, Atlantic salmon and barramundi. Mud crabs have also been cultivated in Australia for many years, sometimes leading to over-exploitation. Traditionally, this aquaculture was limited to table oysters and pearls, but since the early 1970s, there has been significant research and commercial development of other forms of aquaculture, including finfish, crustaceans, and molluscs.

Australia produces 240,000 tonnes of fish a year with aquaculture contributing a third to this. Over the decade to 2006–07 aquaculture production has almost doubled from 29,300 tonnes to 57,800 tonnes. The gross value of aquaculture production in Australia continued to rise in 2007–08 by $62.7 million to $868 million. In 2008 the Aquaculture industry directly employed more than 7000 people and indirectly contributed 20,000 and was the fastest-growing primary industry in Australia.

== History ==
There is evidence of aquaculture being practised in Australia thousands of years ago by some of the Aboriginal Australian peoples, notably the Gunditjmara's farming of short-finned eels in the Budj Bim heritage areas in western Victoria, and the Brewarrina fish traps on the Barwon River in New South Wales, which were created and used by a number of local peoples.

== National Aquaculture Council ==
The National Aquaculture Council (NAC) is the peak industry body representing aquaculture in Australia. NAC provides the industry with a credible voice at the political level, and strives for greater influence of issues of national significance for Australia's aquaculture industry. Since its establishment in 2001, NAC has developed a reputation amongst key Australian Government Ministers and agencies with an interest in aquaculture, primarily the Department of Agriculture, Fisheries and Forestry. The NAC is governed by a Board of Directors, which is responsible for determining the strategic direction of the NAC's work program. In addition to these industry members, are other NAC members including a variety of aquaculture organisations and groups.

=== Code of Conduct ===
The National Aquaculture Council maintains a voluntary Australian Aquaculture Industry Code of Conduct, which was first published in 1998. The Code includes the following five guiding principles for best environmental practice:

1. Comply with regulations
2. Respect the rights and safety of others
3. Protect the environment
4. Treat aquatic animals humanely
5. Promote the safety of seafood and other aquatic foods for human consumption

== Australian aquaculture sectors ==
=== Marine finfish ===
The marine finfish industry is an inshore and offshore sea cage-farming sector, which primarily operates in South Australia and Tasmania with some farms in other States. The principal species grown are southern bluefin tuna, Atlantic salmon, yellowtail kingfish, mulloway and barramundi. Operations typically involve pre-dawn loading of vessels and delivering feed to the sea cages. Cleaning and maintenance duties are performed, with divers undertaking net repairs and cleaning in most farms. A second run is undertaken in the afternoon or early evening.

==== Southern bluefin tuna ====
The aquaculture component of the Australian tuna sector involves the culturing of tuna in offshore sea pontoons. Before dawn, feed is loaded on modified fishing boats that travel to the sea pontoons, which can be up to 25 km out at sea. Feeding, maintenance and harvesting operations are performed, as well as monitoring the fish, and undertaking environmental activities that comply with the licence conditions. Weather conditions determine when fish can be fed and pontoon systems maintained. Generally the operation is seven days a week and is undertaken over a six-month season.

Southern bluefin tuna aquaculture was first initiated in Australia in 1990 through a collaborative research and development program involving the Australian Southern Bluefin Tuna Industry Association (ASBTIA), previously the Tuna Boat Owners Association of Australia (TBOASA), the Japanese Overseas Fishery Cooperation Foundation and the South Australian Government. Southern bluefin tuna is the most valuable sector of South Australia's aquaculture industry and is represented by the Australian Southern Bluefin Tuna Industry Association (ASBTIA).

==== Atlantic salmon ====
The Australian Atlantic salmon industry is based in Tasmania. The aquaculture sector involves the collection of broodstock and production of fingerlings for grow out in sea cages, which are located in offshore and inshore waters. A specialist fleet of vessels performs feeding and harvesting operations at sea, with the most common working hours occurring between 4:00 am and 7:59 – 8:00 pm. The Tasmanian Salmonid Growers' Association Ltd is the peak body representing salmon growers throughout Tasmania.

=== Freshwater fish ===
There are many small to medium freshwater fish farms throughout Australia, growing a wide range of species including Murray cod, silver perch, jade perch and eels. Systems vary from intensive tank rearing systems to automatic systems to pond and dam systems.

=== Crustaceans ===
==== Prawns ====
The Australian prawn farming industry is largely based in the tropical zones of Queensland. Prawns are farmed in large-scale pond operations, which operate round the clock and every day of the year. Farms are located in four Australian states—New South Wales, Queensland, Northern Territory and Western Australia.

The farms generally have their own hatchery and the whole operation involves hatching, growing, harvesting and processing in an integrated continual process operation. Unlike most aquaculture species, prawns feed at night, which means that feeding must be performed during the evening or early morning hours. Operational hours extend from 2:30 am through to 11 pm.

The Australian Prawn Farmer's Association (APFA) was formed in 1993 to represent the interests and foster the development of the Australian prawn farming industry. The Australian prawn farming industry now produces over 4,000 tonnes of product annually with a farm gate value in excess of $70 million, providing more than 1000 direct jobs and 1800 indirect jobs. While the Australian industry is one of the smaller volumetric producers in the world, it leads the world in productivity with an average yield of more than 4,500 kilograms (9,900 lb) per hectare.

==== Yabbies, red claw and marron ====
There are many small land-based crustacean farms in Australia. Yabbies are most common and are typically an incidental aquaculture operation to general land-based farming. Red claw farms are also scattered throughout Australia but mostly in Queensland and New South Wales. Marron farms operate mainly in Western Australia and South Australia and tend to be larger scale pond operations.

=== Shellfish ===
==== Abalone (land-based) ====
Land-based abalone farms largely operate intensive grow out systems, which are most often based around raceway technologies. While a majority of farms have integrated hatchery and grow-out operations, some rely on purchasing spat from dedicated hatcheries. Broodstock is regularly collected from the wild through diving operations and forms the basis of the hatchery operations and genetic diversity. Most land-based abalone farms are 24-hour operations involving continuous monitoring of the water systems and the stock. Any interruption to the water supply and water temperature can be catastrophic with large-scale losses.

==== Abalone (sea-based) ====
Two types of marine abalone systems include sea cage technology and a special converted grow-out vessel. Broodstock is sourced from the wild and juvenile abalone grown in hatchery complexes. The stock is then transferred to special sea cages with unique grow-out plates and the stock is managed and harvested on a continuous basis by groups of commercial divers.

After trials in 2012, a commercial "sea ranch" was set up in Flinders Bay, Western Australia to raise abalone. The ranch is based on an artificial reef made up of 5000 (As of April 2016) separate concrete units called 'abitats' (abalone habitats). The 900 kilograms (2,000 lb) 'abitats' can host 400 abalone each. The reef is seeded with young abalone from an onshore hatchery.

The abalone feed on seaweed that has grown naturally on the habitats, with the ecosystem enrichment of the bay also resulting in growing numbers of dhufish, pink snapper, wrasse, and Samson fish, among other species.

Brad Adams, from the company, has emphasised the similarity to wild abalone and the difference from shore based aquaculture. "We're not aquaculture, we're ranching, because once they're in the water they look after themselves."

==== Mussels ====
The mussel industry is widespread throughout Australia with large-scale operations in Tasmania, South Australia and Victoria. Marine rope systems are used to grow the mussels. As mussels are filter feeders, farms rely upon natural feed including algae, detritus and bacteria, rather than artificial diets or pellets. Harvesting involves the operation of specialised mussel –stripping machinery on purpose-built vessels. While farms operate throughout the year, there is a 'busy season' of mussel production from January to May.

==== Pacific oysters ====
The Pacific oyster industry mostly operates in Tasmania, South Australia, Victoria and New South Wales. The industry is a marine-based industry (apart from the hatchery complexes) with most farms accessed by commercial vessels which are used to maintain the grow-out sites and harvest the oysters.

==== Pearls ====
The Australian pearling industry is based on the Pinctada maxima pearl oyster species. Since the mid-1950s the industry has focused on the production of cultured pearls. The first stage of culturing pearls requires fishing for wildstock pearl oysters, which are then used to manufacture cultured pearls through an aquaculture process. Western Australia is the main pearl-producing state, with The Pearl Producers Association (PPA) acting as the state's peak representative body for the Pinctada maxima pearl oyster culture industry. The Northern Territory is the second-largest pearl-producing state.

==== Sydney rock oysters ====
This industry operates in New South Wales, Queensland, Victoria and Western Australia and farms a single oyster species (Saccostrea glomerata) in a number of estuarine and ocean settings. Operations involve small vessels engaging in daily trips to the oyster beds for checking, sorting, grading and harvesting the oysters. The farms operate in daylight hours with relatively short trips to the farm sites each day. Once ashore, the operations grade and clean the oysters and prepare them for dispatch to markets on the East Coast.

== See also ==
- Budj Bim heritage areas
- Naeraberg
- Seafood in Australia
