= Abel Tasman (disambiguation) =

Abel Tasman (1603–1659) was a Dutch explorer.

Abel Tasman may also refer to:

- Abel Tasman (horse) (born 2014), American thoroughbred racehorse
- Abel Tasman National Park, a national park in the North end of the South Island, New Zealand
- MS Theofilos or Abel Tasman, a ferry
- FV Margiris or Abel Tasman, a trawling vessel
- Abel Tasman, a passenger aircraft that crashed as flight Trans Australia Airlines Flight 538 in 1960
- Able Tasmans, an indie pop band from New Zealand formed in 1983
