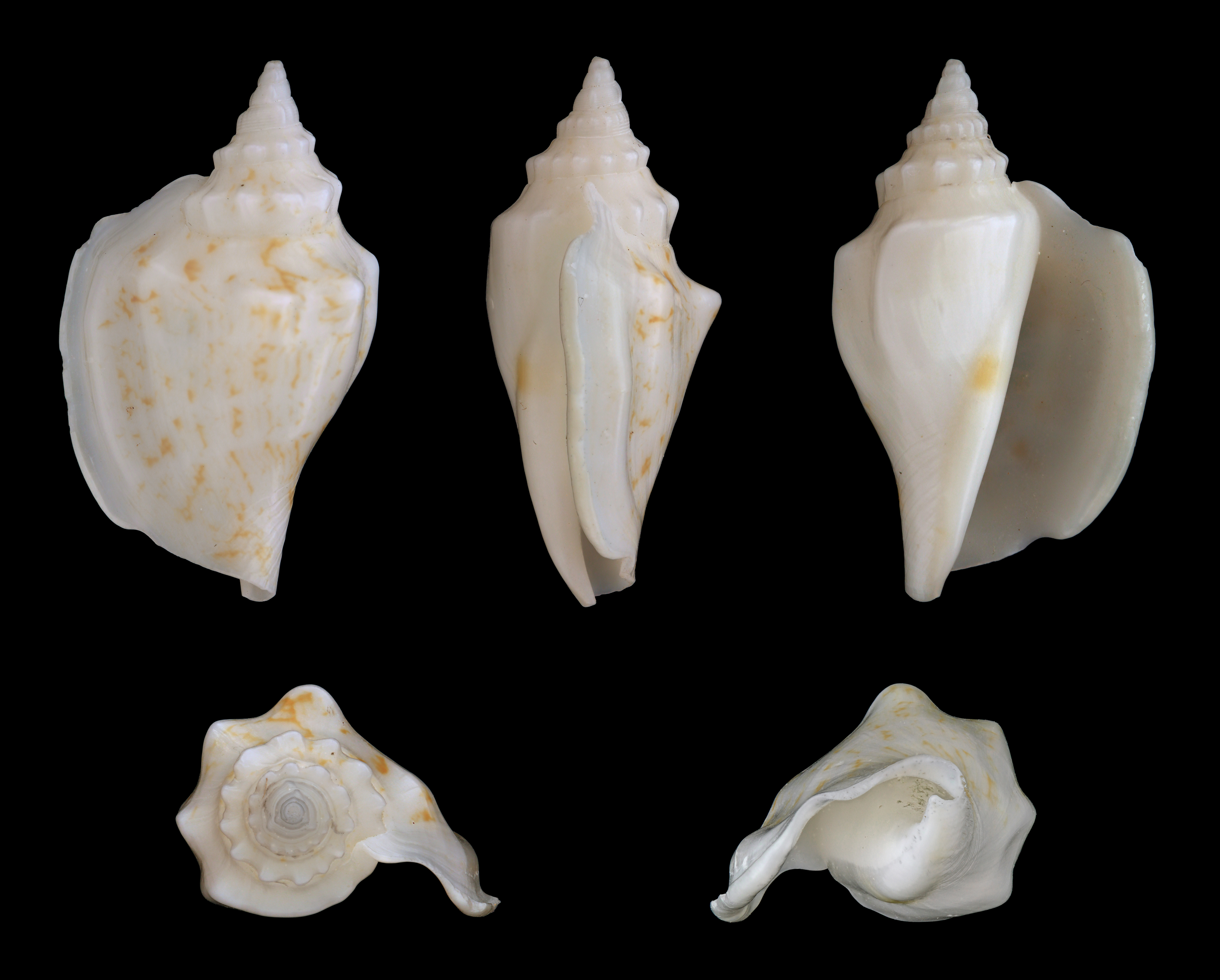

Scientific classification
- Kingdom: Animalia
- Phylum: Mollusca
- Class: Gastropoda
- Subclass: Caenogastropoda
- Order: Littorinimorpha
- Superfamily: Stromboidea
- Family: Strombidae
- Genus: Dolomena; Wenz, 1940

Type species
- Strombus pulchellus Reeve, 1851

Synonyms
- Amabiliplicatus Dekkers & S. J. Maxwell, 2020 (original rank); Dolomena (Amabiliplicatus) Dekkers & S. J. Maxwell, 2020 alternative representation; Dolomena (Dolomena) Wenz, 1940 alternative representation; Dolomena (Pacificus) Dekkers & S. J. Maxwell, 2020 alternative representation; Margistrombus Bandel, 2007 · unavailable name (unavailable name under Art. 13.1.1 (no description)); Neodilatilabrum Dekkers, 2008 junior subjective synonym; Pacificus Dekkers & S. J. Maxwell, 2020 (original rank); Strombus (Dolomena) Wenz, 1940; Strombus (Margistrombus) Bandel, 2007 unavailable name under Art. 13.1.1 (no description)

= Dolomena =

Genus of gastropods

Dolomena is a genus of sea snails, marine gastropod mollusks in the family Strombidae, the true conchs.

The name of the genus Dolomena was originally introduced by Iredale in 1931, but he did not provide a description. Therefore, he was not accepted as the author of this genus (Art. 13.1 of the ICZN Code)

== Species ==
Species within the genus Dolomena include:

- Dolomena columba (Lamarck, 1822)
- Dolomena dilatata (Swainson, 1821)
- Dolomena eloiseae (Vertriest, 2022)
- Dolomena epidromis (Linnaeus, 1758)
- Dolomena hickeyi (Willan, 2000)
- Dolomena marginata (Linnaeus, 1758)
- Dolomena orosminus (Duclos, 1844)
- Dolomena plicata (Röding, 1798)
- Dolomena pulchella (Reeve, 1851)
- Dolomena robusta (G. B. Sowerby III, 1875)
- † Dolomena rutteni (van Regteren Altena, 1941)
- Dolomena sibbaldii (G. B. Sowerby II, 1842)
- Dolomena succincta (Linnaeus, 1767)
- Dolomena swainsoni (Reeve, 1851)
- Dolomena taeniata (Quoy & Gaimard, 1834)
- Dolomena tasminae (S. J. Maxwell, 2023)
- † Dolomena togopiensis (L. R. Cox, 1948)
- Dolomena turturella (Röding, 1798)
- Dolomena vanikorensis (Quoy & Gaimard, 1834)
- Dolomena vittata (Linnaeus, 1758)
- Dolomena yerburyi (E. A. Smith, 1891)

Species brought into synonymy

- Dolomena abbotti Dekkers & Liverani, 2011: synonym of Dominus abbotti (Dekkers & Liverani, 2011) (superseded combination)
- † Dolomena bruneiensis Harzhauser, Raven & Landau, 2018 : synonym of † Laevispira bruneiensis (Harzhauser, Raven & Landau, 2018) (superseded combination)
- Dolomena labiosa (Wood, 1828): synonym of Dominus labiosus (W. Wood, 1828) (superseded combination)
- Dolomena minima (Linnaeus, 1771): synonym of Ministrombus minimus (Linnaeus, 1771) (superseded combination
- Dolomena septima (Duclos, 1844): synonym of Margistrombus septimus (Duclos, 1844)
- Dolomena sibbaldi (Sowerby II, 1842): synonym of Dolomena plicata sibbaldii (G. B. Sowerby II, 1842)
- Dolomena sowerbyorum (Visser & Man in 't Veld, 2005): synonym of Dolomena robusta (G. B. Sowerby III, 1875) (junior subjective synonym)
- Dolomena variabilis (Swainson, 1820): synonym of Ministrombus variabilis (Swainson, 1820)
- Dolomena wienekei Wiersma & D. Monsecour, 2012: synonym of Dominus wienekei (Wiersma & D. Monsecour, 2012) (superseded combination)
