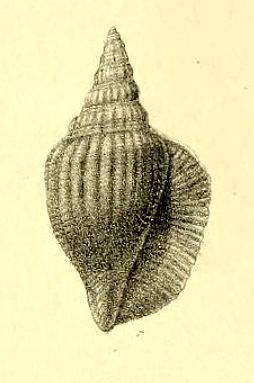
- Original image of a shell of Dolomena plicata yerburyi (E. A. Smith, 1891)

Scientific classification
- Kingdom: Animalia
- Phylum: Mollusca
- Class: Gastropoda
- Subclass: Caenogastropoda
- Order: Littorinimorpha
- Family: Strombidae
- Genus: Dolomena
- Species: D. plicata

Binomial name
- Dolomena plicata (Röding, 1798)

Synonyms
- Lambis plicata Röding, 1798 (basionym); Strombus deformis Gray [in Griffith & Pidgeon], 1834; Strombus malekulensis Abrard, R., 1946; Strombus plicatus (Röding, 1798); Strombus plicatus plicatus (Röding, 1798); Strombus columba Lamarck, 1822

= Dolomena plicata =

Species of gastropod

Dolomena plicata, common name the pigeon conch, is a species of medium-sized to large sea snail, a marine gastropod mollusk in the family Strombidae, the true conchs.

Subspecies

- Dolomena plicata sibbaldi (G. B. Sowerby II, 1842) (synonyms: Dolomena sibbaldi (G. B. Sowerby II, 1842); Strombus kieneri Issel & Tapparone Canefri, 1876; Strombus sibbaldi G. B. Sowerby II, 1842 (original combination) )
- Dolomena plicata yerburyi (E. A. Smith, 1891) (synonym: Strombus yerburyi E. A. Smith, 1891 )

== Description ==
The length of the shell varies between 45 mm and 77 mm. The Dolomena plicita has a pointed bottom and rounds out near the middle before transitioning to a spiral pointed tip. It also boasts ridges and an open flange on the side where the snails abdomen makes contact with the outside world.

== Distribution ==
This species occurs in the Red Sea and in the Indian Ocean off East Africa.
