= Seafood in Australia =

Overview of fishing in Australia

Seafood in Australia comes from local and international commercial fisheries, aquaculture and recreational anglers. It is an economically important sector, and along with agriculture and forestry contributed $24,744 million to Australia's GDP in year 2007–2008, out of a total GDP of $1,084,146 million. Commercial fisheries in Commonwealth waters are managed by the Australian Fisheries Management Authority, while commercial and recreational fishing in state waters is managed by various state-level agencies.

The sustainable seafood movement is growing in Australia as consumers become more aware of conservation issues and the importance of maintaining fish stocks. Organisations such as the Marine Stewardship Council and Australian Marine Conservation Society's GoodFish: Australia's Sustainable Seafood Guide have released guides helping consumers make sustainable seafood choices.

== Overview ==
=== Production by state ===
The largest share, 22%, of the whole gross value generated by seafood production in the Commonwealth area – not only in Australia – is attributable to Tasmania, while South and Western Australia follow with 21% and 20% each. Australia has special rights over the exploitation of an Exclusive Economic Zone (EEZ) extending 200 nautical miles (370 km) from the coastline, exceeding that of its land mass. Within the EEZ seazone, free use of marine resources is allowed (Geoscience Australia. 2005. Maritime Boundary Definitions). Australia's fishing zone is the third largest in the world, covering 11 million square kilometres, yet Australia is only the 52nd largest producer in terms of volume.

In South Australia, fish farming of marine finfish is the most valuable part of the seafood sector. Fish farming of salmon dominates the Tasmanian seafood industry, while fish farming occurs at pilot scale in Western Australia.

=== Composition ===
Fisheries production consists mainly of seafood goods which are marketed for human consumption, but also of non-edible fisheries products, such as pearls and fish meal. Australian seafood product, like most other countries', includes both wild-catch fisheries and aquaculture production. The national product encompasses also the portion addressed to export, but it does not include the amount of fishery imported by Australia from abroad.

=== Exports ===
Monthly export value (A$ millions) of seafood and preparations thereof since 1988

In the year 2007–2008, Australia exported fisheries products for a value of $1.3 billion, approximately 80% of which was derived from edible fishery export, such as shellfish and fish; the remainder was non-edible products, predominantly pearls. Despite the still-considerable share of the domestic product resulting from export, the purchases of Australian seafood from foreign countries has fallen by 10%, if compared to the rates of the previous year. Such a fall is estimated to be due to a general fall in the whole volume of edible fisheries production. So, since most exports concern fish and shellfish, a decrease in the production of these goods (coming from both wild catch and aquaculture) affects the amount which can be exported.

=== Imports ===
Monthly import value (A$ millions) of seafood and preparations thereof since 1988

Fisheries products imported by Australia within the year 2007–2008 accounted for a value of $1.4 billion. Like countries towards whom Australia aims its own exports, Australian imports derive mainly (approximately 80%) from edible fishery products; the remainder is due again to pearls and fishmeal, i.e. non-edible goods. During previous year, imports in the fishery sector declined by 5%, mainly because of a fall in the demand of imported crustaceans, molluscs ( – 14%) and non-edibles (- 6%); notwithstanding, the share of expense assigned to imports has recently come to exceed the amount of income coming from exportations: $1.4 billion > $1.3 billion. In fact, in 2007–2008 Australia became a net importer of fisheries products, both in terms of volume and in terms of value, although the composition of its exports differs from the imports’, as Australian fisheries exports are dominated by high-value species, while its imports consist of lower-value products such as frozen or canned fish.

== Seafood trade flow ==
=== Most important species produced in Australian oceans ===
Amongst all species sold on the Australian fish market 2007–2008, Australian sardines took the biggest share in terms of volume with 33,600 tonnes landed and traded. Salmonoids, including salmon and trout, were the second most dominant portion of the market, at 25,500 tonnes, followed by prawns at 22,400 tonnes, tuna at 14,700 tonnes and rock lobster at 13,800 tonnes.

In the Australian fishery market the rock lobster brought the largest revenue; exchanged for a value of $407 million. Salmon and trout kept the second position with $299 million, with prawns third at $268 million and tuna fourth at $210 million. Finally, abalone is the fifth commercially most important species for the Australian fish market, generating $189 million.

=== Exports and imports of the most commercially important species ===
In 2007–2008 the export of rock lobster generated a $401 million income, followed by abalone at $217 million and prawns at $69 million. Most exports are sent to Asia, with a minor amount going to the United States.

Regarding Australian fish imports: canned fish is estimated to be the most imported at $257 million, frozen fish fillets at $228 million, prawns (fresh, chilled and frozen) at $167 million and canned crustaceans and molluscs at $128 million.

According to the Seafood Importer's Association of Australasia (SIAA), Hoki, Hake, Nile perch and Basa are the most relevant species of fish imported to Australia, in terms of volume

== Seafood consumption ==
=== Total seafood consumption per capita in kg ===
In the 1990s seafood consumption was 14.7 kg per capita in Perth and 15.1 kg in Sydney. In 2005, seafood consumption in Melbourne was 12.49 kg per capita.

=== Seafood consumption by species in tonnes/value ===
In FY07/08: Tuna was 6.2% of the domestic catch and 9.6% of total revenue Salmonoids (salmon and trout) were 10.8% of total catch and 13.6% of revenue Prawns were 9.5% of total catch and 12.2% of revenue Rock lobster was 5.8% of total catch and 18.5% of revenue Abalone was 2.2% of total catch and 8.6% of revenue Oysters were 4% of catch and 5.2% of revenue Scallops were 4.3% of total catch and 1.4% of revenue

- Catch includes aquaculture seafood

=== Recent developments and trends of seafood consumption ===
By 2006, out of home seafood consumption had grown substantially, with a shift from 'whole' to 'convenience' fish bought for home use. Consumers preferred seafood that is easily prepared including canned and pre-prepared varieties.

=== Cultural seafood consumption patterns and peak times of seafood consumption ===
People of Asian descent tend to have unique preferences for different fish varieties, with demand for imported species such as milkfish, tilapia, snakehead and pomfret.

== Issues in fisheries management ==
=== Emerging issues ===
McPhee in Fisheries Management in Australia identifies a number of emerging issues that are not yet recognised in mainstream fisheries management but which are likely to be of increasing importance.

==== Demographics, population growth and "sea change" ====
Population growth and ageing population as likely to significantly increase domestic demand for seafood and the increased population in fishing ports and along the coastal fringe as likely to cause stresses on fisheries. Increased development is also likely to lead to environmental degradation of coastal fisheries.

==== Marine and estuarine stocking ====
There are ongoing calls from parts of the recreational fishing sector for increased marine and estuarine stocking in view of increasing recreational fishing pressures. Freshwater stocking has been carried out in some freshwater fisheries for many years

==== Climate change ====
Climate change is expected to have impacts on water temperatures, coral reefs and rainfall patterns which will in turn impact on local ecologies and habitat, breeding cycles and range of fish populations. Opportunities may be created as fish populations shift southward.

==== Fuel use and price ====
Fuel prices are a significant factor in profitability of fishing. Total fuel use by the fishing industry is equivalent to that of the Netherlands, the 18th largest national user of fuel. As more accessible stocks become overfished, fuel costs per ton will rise.

==== Internet ====
Increased availability of information to amateur recreational anglers is likely to increase their efficiency, further increasing pressure on fisheries in populated areas.

== Market structure ==
In 2003, from a random sample size of 1004 Australian adults, approximately half the sample at 49% purchased seafood in supermarkets, with 26% at specialist seafood stores, 20% directly from fresh fish markets and 16% catching their own seafood.

Restaurants, hotels and clubs seem to be the main source of fish for approximately 14% of the sample, as well as fish and chips shops at 13%, 4% by family or friends who fish and 2% relying on other fast food outlets.

== See also ==
- Australian Fisheries Management Authority
- Aquaculture in Australia
- Fisheries observer
- Agriculture in Australia – Fisheries
- Conservation in Australia (see protected areas that would otherwise be fisheries)
- Environmental issues in Australia (see section on Marine conservation)
- Australian Marine Conservation Society
