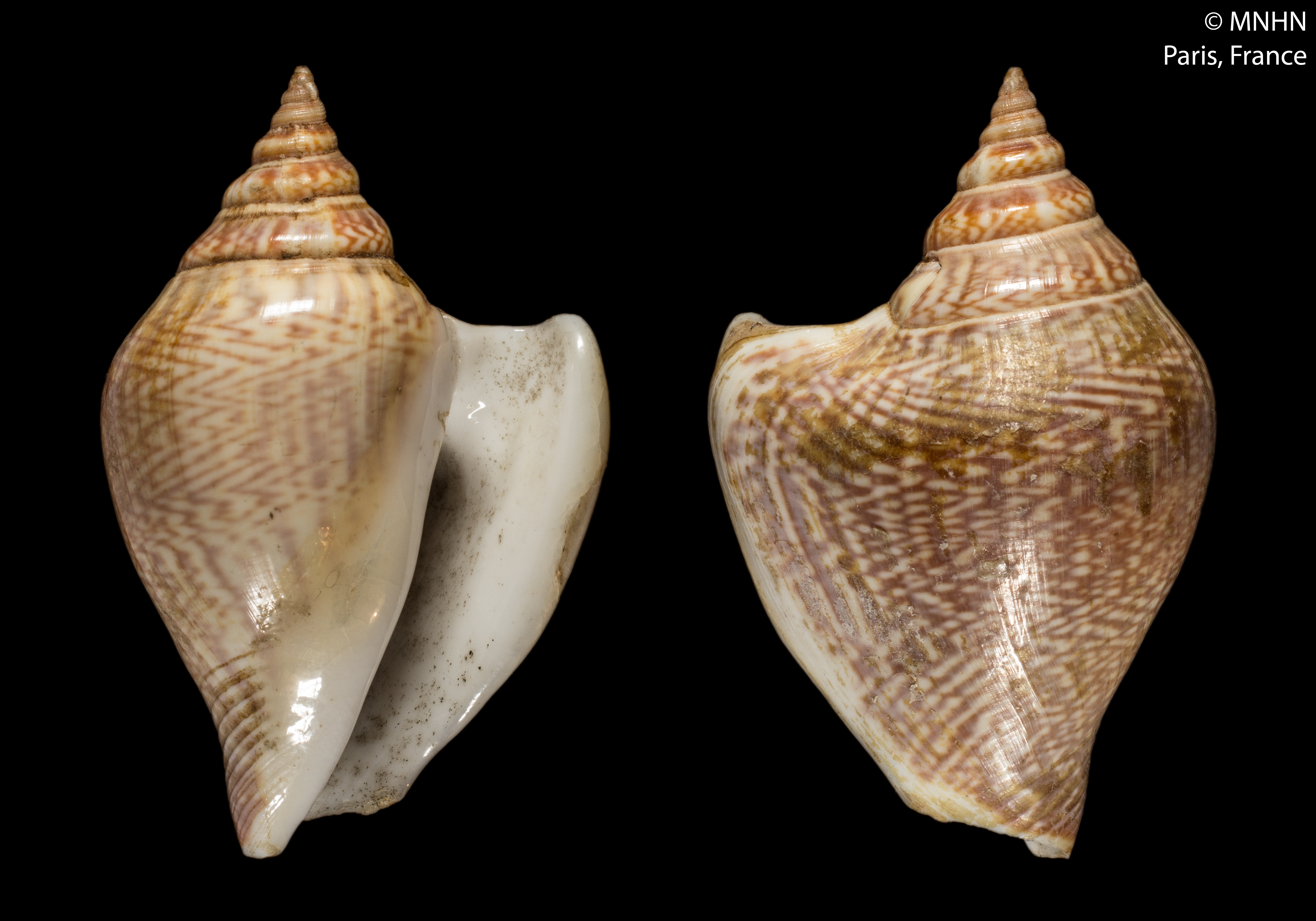

Scientific classification
- Kingdom: Animalia
- Phylum: Mollusca
- Class: Gastropoda
- Subclass: Caenogastropoda
- Order: Littorinimorpha
- Family: Strombidae
- Genus: Dolomena
- Species: D. vanikorensis

Binomial name
- Dolomena vanikorensis Quoy & Gaimard, 1834

Synonyms
- Laevistrombus (Laevistrombus) vanikorensis (Quoy & Gaimard, 1834); Laevistrombus vanikorensis (Quoy & Gaimard, 1834) superseded combination; Strombus vanikorensis (Quoy & Gaimard, 1834)

= Dolomena vanikorensis =

Species of gastropod

Dolomena vanikorensis is a species of sea snail, a marine gastropod mollusc in the family Strombidae (true conches).

== Description ==
Dolomena vanikorensis presents high consistency regarding the patterning of dark purple to light tan, or orange zigzag lines on a white to cream background. The line distribution and frequency can be quite variable, and sometimes completely white shells can be found. The structure of the shell is triangularly ovate, with the outer lip being thickened and posteriorly calloused.

In the eastern parts of its distribution, pale and white shells can be found, though specimens from the western parts of its distribution have a unique blue-tinted band below the suture of the shell. There is also a rare golden form located in Queensland, Australia.

== Distribution ==
The species is commonly collected in Queensland from the Cape York Peninsula to Dingo Beach. It is also found from Rabaul, Papua New Guinea along the island chains to the Wallis and Futuna Islands.
