= Ministrombus =

Scientific classification
- Kingdom: Animalia
- Phylum: Mollusca
- Class: Gastropoda
- Subclass: Caenogastropoda
- Order: Littorinimorpha
- Family: Strombidae
- Genus: Ministrombus [[[Klaus Bandel|Bandel]], 2007

Type species
- Strombus minimus Linnaeus, 1771

Synonyms
- Dolomena (Ministrombus) Bandel, 2007 superseded rank; Strombus (Ministrombus) Bandel, 2007 superseded rank

Genus of gastropods

Ministrombus is a genus of sea snails, marine gastropod mollusks in the family Strombidae, the true conchs.

== Nomenclature ==
Some authors have argued that the name Ministrombus is not available from Bandel (2007) and have instead attributed it to Dekkers, 2010 [Gloria Maris, 49(1): 9], who used the name at the rank of genus (and attributed it to Bandel 2007). Admittedly Bandel did not explicitly diagnose the new subgenus, but he included in it only the type species, which he diagnosed, and we take the view that this confered availability to the name Ministrombus.

== Species ==
- † Ministrombus abrardi Dekkers, 2022
- Ministrombus athenius (Duclos, 1844)
- Ministrombus aurantius S. J. Maxwell, 2022
- Ministrombus caledonicus S. J. Maxwell, 2022
- Ministrombus minimus (Linnaeus, 1771)
- Ministrombus oceanicus S. J. Maxwell, 2022
- Ministrombus rhinoceros Dekkers, 2024
- Ministrombus variabilis (Swainson, 1820)
