= Laevistrombus maxwelli =

Scientific classification
- Kingdom: Animalia
- Phylum: Mollusca
- Class: Gastropoda
- Subclass: Caenogastropoda
- Order: Littorinimorpha
- Family: Strombidae
- Genus: Laevistrombus
- Species: L. maxwelli

Binomial name
- Laevistrombus maxwelli Gra-tes, 2022

Species of sea snail

Laevistrombus maxwelli is a species of sea snail, a marine gastropod mollusc in the family Strombidae (true conches). The species is quite distinct from any others in the same genus due to its unique characteristics.

== Etymology ==
Laevistrombus maxwelli was named after Stephen J. Maxwell, Faculty of Science and Engineering in James Cook University, Cairns, Australia. Maxwell's surname was credited into the species' finalized binomial name due to his devotion and studying of the family Strombidae.

== Description ==
L. maxwelli has a smooth, glossy shell that is heavy in comparison to its size and is broad in comparison to its length. The structure of the shell is a triangulated ovate, and the aperture is wider on the back and narrower in the front. The lip surrounding the aperture is quite thick, curving up towards the second suture and the columella is also very thick leading from its center to its anterior. Furthermore, the upper body whorl is globose and the spire of L. maxwelli is higher and wider compared to other species of the same genus.

The dorsal color and the color toward the outer lip is white, though on the last body whorl, the tan color of the shell is lighter towards the inner lip. There is darker coloration on the body whorls.

Laevistrombus maxwelli Investigative Study
Specimen	Width (mm)	Length (mm)	Width/Length Ratio (mm)	Weight (gm)
Holotype	38.4	54.1	0.709	19
Paratype 1	38.0	56.0	0.678	24
Paratype 2	42.5	58.0	0.732	32
Paratype 3	43.8	60.4	0.725	32
Paratype 4	42.6	63.4	0.671	31
Paratype 5	40.0	58.8	0.680	23
Paratype 6	41.5	54.0	0.768	25
Paratype 7	42.1	57.1	0.737	27
Average	-	-	0.713	-

During an investigation to compare the description of this species to other species of the genus Laevistrombus, a large amount of information was extracted, concluding that L. maxwelli is very distinct morphologically. In the study, the shell length ranged from 54.0 mm (2.1 in) to 63.4 mm (2.5 in), and the shell width ranged from 38.0 mm (1.5 in) to 43.8 mm (1.7 in).

== Distribution ==
L. maxwelli can be found along the coast of Chonburi to Trat province, Gulf of Thailand. The species is also known in northern Borneo and in southern Philippines. Its type locality is Chonburi, northeast of the Gulf of Thailand. The initial holotype and additional paratypes were caught on the surface of and buried in sand at low tide.
