= Dolomena hickeyi =

Scientific classification
- Kingdom: Animalia
- Phylum: Mollusca
- Class: Gastropoda
- Subclass: Caenogastropoda
- Order: Littorinimorpha
- Family: Strombidae
- Genus: Dolomena
- Species: D. hickeyi

Binomial name
- Dolomena hickeyi (Willan, 2000)

Synonyms
- Strombus hickeyi Willan, 2000

Species of gastropod

Dolomena hickeyi is a species of sea snail, a marine gastropod mollusk in the family Strombidae, the true conchs.

== Description ==
The shell grows to a length of 55 mm.

== Distribution ==
This species is distributed along the Philippines and Queensland, Australia.
