= Aquaculture Advisory Committee =

South Australia CommUNITY Stewardship Group

The Aquaculture Advisory Committee (AAC) was established by the Government of South Australia to support the development of the aquaculture sector in the state- the birthplace of Southern bluefin tuna ranching. Its role was to provide relevant advice to the Minister regarding the administration of the Aquaculture Act 2001, related policies, proposals, regulations and any amendments to them. In 2012, Fisheries Minister Gail Gago described the AAC as playing "a vital role in informing and advising Government to ensure the ecological sustainable development of South Australia’s world-leading aquaculture." In September 2014 it was recommended that the council be abolished in favour of direct sectoral representation.

== Membership ==
Members were appointed to the Aquaculture Advisory Committee for a period of three years, following a nomination process. As of 2012, members were entitled to sitting fees of $206 per 4 hour session. The Committee typically mets four to five times a year and meetings were held at 25 Grenfell St, Adelaide. The Committee included a combination of Members and Deputy Members who together represent the industry, its regulators and local government.

At 30 June 2014, membership included:

Name	Membership	Representative role
Catherine Cooper	Presiding Member	Nominated by the Minister
Trent Rusby	Member	Administration of Harbors and Navigation Act 1993
Andrew 'Andy' Dyer	Member	Aquaculture industry, Kinkawooka Mussels & SA Mussel Growers Association
Jillian 'Jill' Coates	Member	Aquaculture industry, South Australian Aquaculture Council
Michelle Grady	Member	Environmental conservation
Brian Jeffriess	Member	Aquaculture industry, Australian Southern Bluefin Tuna Industry Association
Hagen Stehr	Member	Aquaculture industry, Stehr Group, Clean Seas
Professor Kym Abbott	Member	Research & Development, University of Adelaide
Stewart Payne	Member	Local Government
Peter Dolan	Member	Administration of Environment Protection Act 1993
Mehdi Doroudi	Member	Administration of Aquaculture Act 2001
David Craig Ellis	Deputy Member	Aquaculture industry, David Ellis & Associates
Helen Fulcher	Deputy Member	Environmental conservation
Roseanne Healy	Deputy Member	Research & Development
Tara Ingerson	Deputy Member	Administration of Environment Protection Act 1993
Rachel Lawrie	Deputy Member	Aquaculture industry, Marine biologist
Jonathan 'John' Luckens	Deputy Member	Aquaculture industry, Australian Freshwater Crayfish Growers' Association SA
Lorraine Rosenberg	Deputy Member	Local Government
Emmanuelle Sloan	Deputy Member	Administration of Aquaculture Act 2001
Marcus Stehr	Deputy Member	Aquaculture industry, Stehr Group, Clean Seas
Abigail Walters	Deputy Member	Administration of Harbors and Navigation Act 1993

Previous members included (but were not limited to):

- Prof. Gail Anderson
- Prof. Anthony Cheshire
- Steven Clarke
- Andrew Christian
- Debra Davey
- Andrew James Ferguson
- David Hitchcock
- Julianne Marshall
- Steven Mawer
- Heather Montgomerie
- Mary Mitchell
- Ian Nightingale
- Frederick 'Fred' Pedler
- Emmanuelle Sloan
- Jeffrey Todd
- Grant Westphalen
- Wolfgang Zeidler
- Bruce Zippell
