= Kirkella trawler =

British fishing vessel

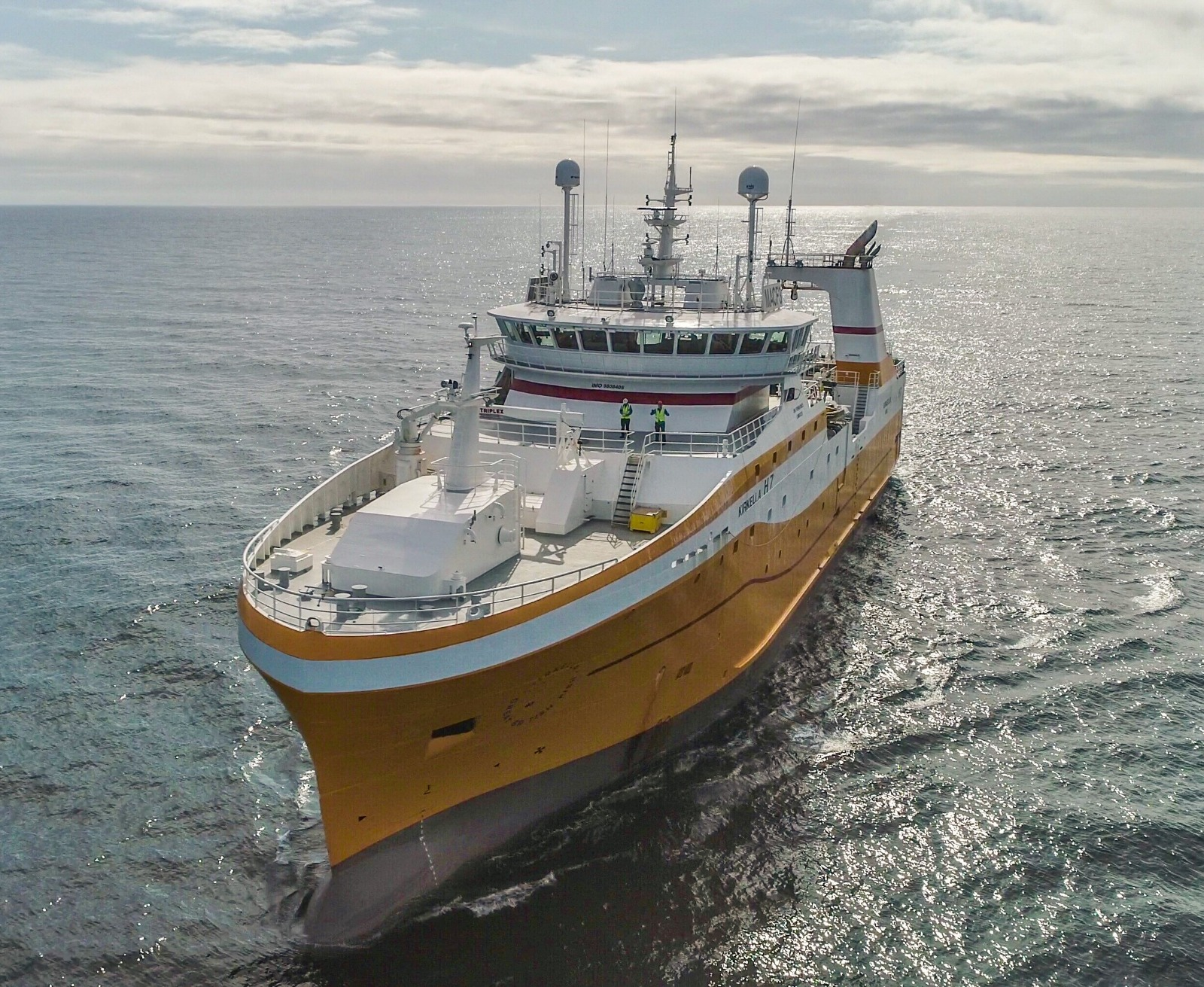
- Kirkella trawler

History

United Kingdom
- Name: Kirkella
- Operator: UK Fisheries Limited
- Acquired: June 2018
- Home port: Hull, UK
- Identification: Call sign MACF3
- Status: Operational

Kirkella is a British cod and haddock freezer trawler based in Kingston upon Hull, England. Part of the UK's distant waters fishing fleet, the vessel was registered in June 2018, is 81 m (266 ft) long, has a 16 m (52 ft) beam, and measures 3,976 gross tons. The crew's accommodation contains a gym and cinema.

Kirkella's catch and access arrangements fell within agreements made by the EU within Regional Fisheries Management Organisations (NEAFC and NAFO) and with Denmark (on behalf of Greenland and the Faroe Islands) and Norway. Normally fishing off-Norway contributed a large part of the catch, but after the UK's exit from the European Union, the UK government was unable to immediately establish mutual access agreements with their Norwegian counterparts., and the Kirkella spent part of the year unable to fish. A comprehensive access and sharing agreement was signed between the UK and Norwegian governments on 21 Dec 2021.

Kirkella provided approximately 10 per cent of the cod and haddock consumed in fish & chip shops.

Kirkella's main areas of operation are the Barents Sea, Greenland waters, NAFO (northwest Atlantic) and the Norwegian Sea. Each expedition takes four to six weeks.

Her Royal Highness The Princess Royal named Kirkella on 24 April 2019 in a ceremony attended by officers, crew and shareholders of Kirkella's owner, UK Fisheries Limited. Decked out in bunting and naval flags, Kirkella arrived at Greenwich on the day before, steamed under a raised Tower Bridge before turning opposite the Tower of London and then returning to moor at Greenwich, close to Cutty Sark Gardens.

Rolls-Royce Marine AS of Ålesund, Norway, designed the boat, with the CRIST shipyard in Poland building the hull and Myklebust Verft AS doing the fitting out.
