= Geelong Star =

Fishing trawler launched in 1990

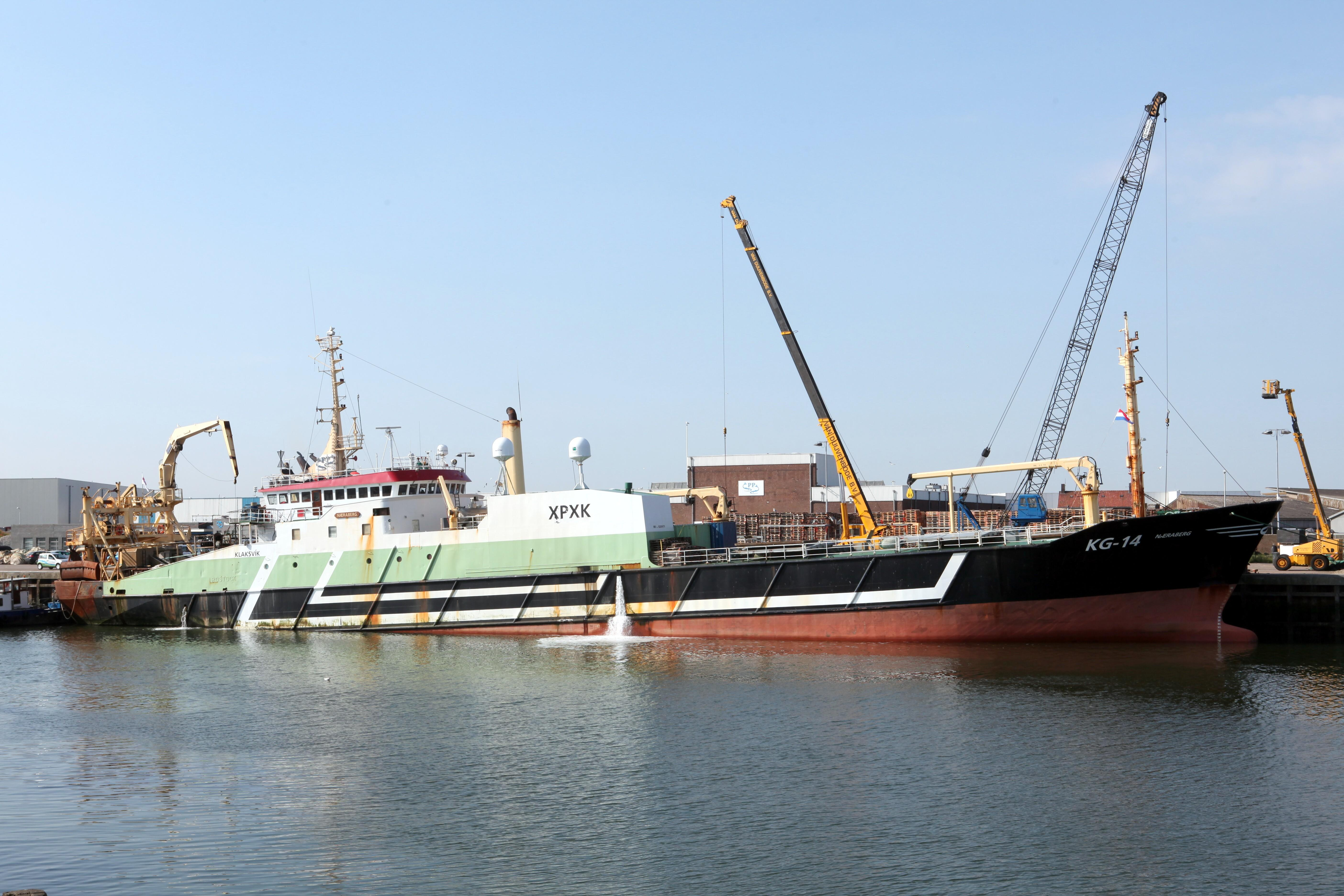
- Geelong Star as Naeraberg at IJmuiden in 2010

History
- Name: Dirk-Dirk KW 172 (1983–2009); Naeraberg (2009–2015); DirkDirk KW 172 (2015); Geelong Star (2015–2016); Dirk-Dirk KW 172 (2016–)
- Owner: Parlevliet & van der Plas, Katwijk, Netherlands (1983–1993)(2016–); Doggerbank Seefischerei GmbH, Bremerhaven (1993–1995); Ostbank Hochseefischerei GmbH & Co, Sassnitz, Germany (1995–2009); P/F Naeraberg, Klaksvík, Faroe Islands (2009–2011, 2012–2015); JSC Atlantic High Sea Fishing Co, Vilnius, Lithuania (2011–2012); Seafish Tasmania Pelagic Pty Ltd, Triabunna, Australia (2015–2016)
- Port of registry: Netherlands (1983–1990); West Germany (1990); Germany (1990–2009); Faroe Islands (2009–2011); Lithuania (2011–2012); Faroe Islands (2012–2015); Australia (2015–2016); Netherlands (since 2016)
- Builder: Scheepswerf- en Reparatiebedrijf "Harlingen" BV, Harlingen, Netherlands
- Yard number: 64
- Launched: October 1983
- Completed: 10 December 1983
- Identification: IMO number: 8209171
- Status: In service

General characteristics
- Class & type: Super-trawler
- Tonnage: 3,181 GT, 2,756 DWT
- Length: 95.2 m (312 ft)
- Beam: 14.8 m (49 ft)
- Draught: 5.1 m (17 ft)
- Depth: 8.6 m (28 ft)
- Installed power: 4,351 bhp (3,245 kW)
- Propulsion: 6-cylinder diesel engine by MaK, single propeller
- Speed: 14 kn (26 km/h; 16 mph)

Geelong Star was a former name of the 3,181 GT super-trawler and factory ship Dirk-Dirk, built in 1983 at Harlingen, Netherlands for the Dutch fishing company Parlevliet & van der Plas of Katwijk. In 2015–2016 Hobart Star was involved in political controversy and faced protests from those opposed to the use of super-trawlers in Australian fisheries.

== Design and construction ==
The vessel was ordered in 1980 from the Dutch shipyard Scheepswerf- en Reparatiebedrijf "Harlingen" BV at Harlingen as yard number 64 with IMO number 8209171, launched in October 1983 and entered service in December that year. She has an overall length of 95.18 metres (312 ft 3 in), beam of 14.81 metres (48 ft 7 in), and loaded draught of 5.08 metres (16 ft 8 in), and a gross tonnage (GT) of 3,019 (modified to 3,181 GT in 2000). The trawler has two insulated fish holds totalling 4,300 cubic metres (150,000 cu ft) and a deadweight tonnage of 2,756 tons. She is powered by a 6-cylinder 3,200-kilowatt (4,300 bhp) MaK 6M551AK diesel engine geared to a controllable-pitch propeller and giving the trawler a service speed of 14.0 knots (25.9 km/h; 16.1 mph).

== Commercial service ==
The trawler, under several names, has remained in service with her initial owners, the Katwijk-based Parlevliet & van der Plas Haringhandel BV (PvdP), both directly or with a number of affiliated companies. She entered service as Dirk-Dirk under the Netherlands flag with call-sign PDQL and fishing port registration number KW 174. At the end of August 1990 she was re-registered in the port of Bremerhaven, Germany without change of name, given the port number BX 784 and call-sign DMBB and then, in 1993, transferred to PvdP's local subsidiary Doggerbank Seefischerei GmbH, with call-sign changed to DENR. In 1995 she was transferred within Germany to Ostbank Hochseefischerei GmbH & Co, Sassnitz and registered at Rostock with port number ROS 784.

In October 2009 Dirk-Dirk was renamed Naeraberg (Note: Parlevliet & van der Plas and P/f JFK have subsequently owned another super-trawler Naeraberg of similar design, built as Dirk-Diederik in 1990 (IMO 8918318).) and transferred to the Faroese flag and the ownership of P/f Naeraberg, a PvdP company operating in association with established local company P/f JFK, Klaksvik. She was registered at Klaksvik, with number KG 14 and call-sign XPXK. Naeraberg remained with the Faroese company until 2015, apart from a few months between October 2011 and February 2012 when she was registered at Klaipėda, with port number KL 453 and call-sign LYTM and operated by PvdP's Lithuanian subsidiary, JSC Atlantic High Sea Fishing Co, Vilnius. This is the same company that has owned the larger super-trawler Margiris since 2005. Naeraberg was briefly returned to parent company PvdP in 2015 (reverting briefly to Dirk-Dirk), before being renamed Geelong Star under the Australian flag and ownership of Seafish Tasmania Pelagic Pty of Triabunna, Tasmania, which had previously owned Margiris as Abel Tasman. Geelong Star was registered at Geelong with call-sign VHJK, but bearing the Rostock fishery number ROS 7.

Following her withdrawal from the Australian venture by PvdB, Geelong Star again reverted to her original name Dirk-Dirk, to Netherlands flag and to Katwijk registry, though this time with port number KW 172 and call-sign PBBZ. She remains in active fishing service as at March 2018.

== Australian operations ==
The ship was operated in Australia from 2015 until 2016 by Seafish Tasmania as fishing vessel Geelong Star and was permitted to catch 16,500 tons per year, later increased to 18,623 tons, of red bait, jack mackerel and sardines, using Corio Quay in Geelong as its home port during its time in Australia.

Trawling is banned in Tasmanian waters, with the Premier of Tasmania Will Hodgman saying,

""It's a matter that's determined by the Commonwealth Government, our position in Tasmania is very clear – trawling is in fact banned, we've banned trawling in Tasmanian waters...We also support the continuing ban on super trawlers which has been previously debated. I've communicated that to the Federal Government as well, but matters that come within their control and their responsibility are determined by them – but our position is very clear on this.

In April 2015, The Tasmanian Greens brought forward a motion in the Tasmanian House of Assembly opposing the operation of the Geelong Star in Australian waters and waters around Tasmania. The motion was not supported by Will Hodgman or other Liberal Party members.

The vessel was permitted to take its quota of fish in a designated zone reaching from Queensland, around the south-east coast of Australia, to Western Australia.

Opposition to the operator of the trawler, Seafish Tasmania was interlinked with Tasmanian politics.

Controversy around the ship reached Australian government level with Senate motions over the ship.

The vessel operated in Australia waters without its Automatic Identification System enabled to avoid tracking of the ship by activists.

On 31 October 2016 the ship left Australian waters and returned to the Netherlands, assuming her former name of Dirk Diederik KW 172.

=== Protests ===
Environmental groups were opposed to the style of the trawler and its capacities.

During April 2015, recreational fishers in approximately 50 boats protested on Hobart's Derwent River against the operation of the trawler in Australian waters.

During May 2015, almost 400 residents of Geelong protested at the Geelong Waterfront requesting the trawler be banned from operating in Australian waters.

The public concern over Super Trawlers in general led to the forming of a political party specifically opposed to operations in Australian waters, the Australian Recreational Fishers Party.

=== Senate inquiry ===
The Australian Senate launched an inquiry into super trawlers, chaired by Senator Peter Whish-Wilson.

=== Environmental impact ===
While fishing Australian waters the ship was reported to have netted a whale shark, and causing the deaths of fur seals, albatross and dolphins, facing several bans from fishing zones.

During May 2015, Federal Member for Corangamite Sarah Henderson wrote to Senator Richard Colbeck urging him to ban the trawler from operating in Australian waters.

During June 2016, operators of the vessel in Australia, Seafish Tasmania objected to the release of video footage of a dolphin being captured in the nets of Geelong Star, claiming the footage would cause damage to their business reputation and incite environmental activists to protest at the company's operations.

The reduction of impact on small pelagic fisheries was negotiated, but ultimately failed.

In November 2016, the Australian Fisheries Management Authority announced it was looking into video streaming technology aboard trawlers to improve their response to the welfare of endangered marine wildlife.

== See also ==
- FV Margiris
