= Hideaway Bay, Queensland =

Hideway Bay
- Town
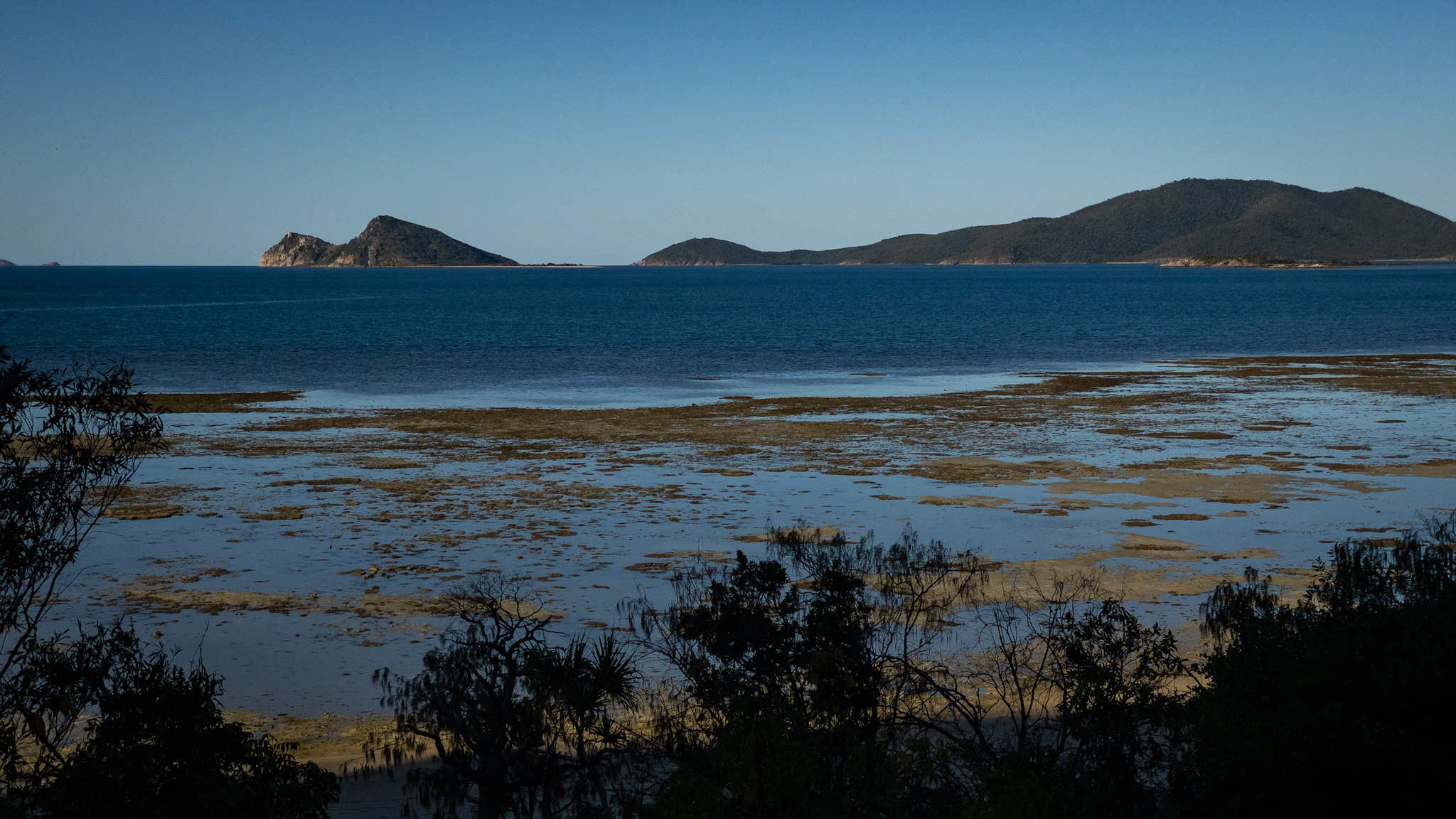
- Shoal Bay off Hideway Bay, 2021

- Interactive map of Hideway Bay
- Coordinates: 20.0789°S 148.4827°E
- Country: Australia
- State: Queensland
- LGA: Whitsunday Region
- Location: 44.5 km (27.7 mi) N of Proserpine; 79.7 km (49.5 mi) ESE of Bowen; 169 km (105 mi) NNW of Mackay; 1,118 km (695 mi) NNW of Brisbane

Government
  - State electorate: Whitsunday
  - Federal division: Dawson

Area
  - Total: 0.9 km^{2} (0.35 sq mi)

Population
  - Total: 232 (2021 census)
  - Density: 258/km^{2} (670/sq mi)
- Time zone: UTC+10:00 (AEST)
- Postcode: 4800
Localities around Hideway Bay
Cape Gloucester	Coral Sea	Coral Sea
Cape Gloucester	Hideway Bay	Coral Sea
Cape Gloucester	Cape Gloucester	Dingo Beach

Hideaway Bay, sometimes written as Hydeaway Bay, is a coastal town and locality in the Whitsunday Region, Queensland, Australia. In the 2021 census, the locality of Hideaway Bay had a population of 232 people.

== Geography ==
Hideaway Bay is a coastal locality on the Whitsunday Coast of North Queensland, Australia, facing north-east toward the sheltered waters of Shoal Bay (20.0775°S 148.4862°E). It lies about 45 kilometres north of Airlie Beach and 30 kilometres north-east of Proserpine, accessed via Dingo Beach Road and Hydeaway Bay Drive from the Bruce Highway near Gregory–Cannon Valley.

The coastline is a long, gently curving sandy beach bordered by shallow coral and seagrass flats. Offshore, nearby islands including Saddleback and Rattray, together with Double Cone, Middle and Gloucester Islands, provide shelter from Coral Sea swell and produce generally low-energy sea conditions.

Being part of the inshore Great Barrier Reef lagoon, the bay is generally low in turbidity due to its sheltered position and limited river input. The coastal waters are typically shallow within a few kilometres of shore and form part of the inshore section of the Great Barrier Reef Marine Park. The region has a tropical climate with a distinct wet and dry season and lies in Cyclone Region C under the Australian wind-loading standard.

Land use within the locality is predominantly low-density residential and tourism-related, with beach access points and local recreation facilities.

The locality is accessed via Hydeaway Road. There is no bay called Hideaway Bay.

== History ==
The town was officially named on 2 December 1989. The locality was officially named and bounded on 28 January 2000.

== Demographics ==
In the 2016 census, the locality of Hideaway Bay had a population of 205 people.

In the 2021 census, the locality of Hideaway Bay had a population of 232 people.

== Education ==
There are no schools in Hideaway Bay. The nearest government primary and secondary schools are Proserpine State School and Proserpine State High School, both in Proserpine to the south.

== Amenities ==
Hideaway Bay has a sports park with a synthetic grass tennis court.

Hideaway Bay Bowls Club has a two-rink bowling green under cover and a club house at 417 Hydeaway Bay Drive (20.0856°S 148.4862°E).
