= Fish farming in Western Australia =

Fish farming in Western Australia is an experimental part of the state's seafood sector. Prominent operators and lessees include Indian Ocean Fresh Australia and Huon Aquaculture, and the primary commercial species are yellowtail kingfish in the Mid West aquaculture zone and barramundi in the Kimberley aquaculture zone. Pink snapper is another species considered as a sea cage fish farming prospect. The Mid West aquaculture zone lies between Geraldton and the Abrolhos Islands, and the Kimberly aquaculture zone is in Cone Bay north of Derby. The sector is represented by Erica Starling as spokesperson for the Marine Fishfarmers Association.

== History ==
A short lived aquaculture course was offered by Curtin University in Esperance from 2003 and ceased in 2006 due to a lack of enrollment.

In 2006-2007 the ASX-listed company Western King Fish Ltd invested $8 million in aquaculture projects at Jurien Bay including a Yellowtail Kingfish venture. The company went into receivership less than 18 months later after a disease outbreak and high fish mortality.

Indian Ocean Fresh Australia has had a series of successful trials growing mulloway initially in 2008, then Yellowtail kingfish in 2011, supported by the West Australian government. Indian Ocean Fresh Australia's yellowtail kingfish sea cage operation is located in Geraldton's Champion Bay.

Kingfish broodstock was initially caught at the nearby Abrolhos Islands and eggs were hatched and cultured after six weeks at the Challenger Institute of Technology in Fremantle. Once the fingerlings reached a minimum weight of one gram, they were transferred to the Batavia Coast Maritime Institute and fed until they were large enough to be transferred into farm's floating sea cage. Early production was sold to the domestic Australian market.

Further trials followed. In 2016, roughly half of the stocked yellowtail kingfish died after a cleaning operation. The first commercial stocking occurred in September 2016, using fingerlings transported from Fremantle.

In 2018, Huon Aquaculture announced its intent to establish a yellowtail kingfish farm in the Mid West aquaculture zone capable of producing 500 tonnes of fish in its first year, before scaling to maximum production capacity of 24,000 tonnes.

In September 2020, Indian Ocean Fresh Australia announced that it would suspend its kingfish farming operations for at least 12 months, after a difficult year of supply chains disrupted by COVID19 border closures and lockdowns.

== Zoning ==
The Mid West aquaculture zone, some 3000 hectares in size, was proposed in 2013 and received environmental approval in 2017. Indian Ocean Fresh Australia's competitor Huon Aquaculture has the largest lease in the zone, some 2,200 hectares, but as of August 2020 had not commenced any fish farming activity within it. The Kimberley aquaculture zone received environmental approval in 2014. It covers some 2,000 hectares and allows for the production of up to 20,000 tonnes of fish, including barramundi.

== Government support ==
The sector's development has been supported by the Royalties for Regions scheme. In 2011, the West Australian government allocated just under $2 million to develop aquaculture zones near Geraldton and another at Cone Bay in the Kimberley. The Kimberley aquaculture zone commenced production of barramundi in 2014. The 2016 trial was partly funded by the West Australian government and proceeds from the sale of fish were being returned to the Government. In 2020, the West Australian government announced that it would project manage the $7 million development of a hatchery at Geraldton to produce yellowtail kingfish at a rate of 200,000 bi-monthly.
