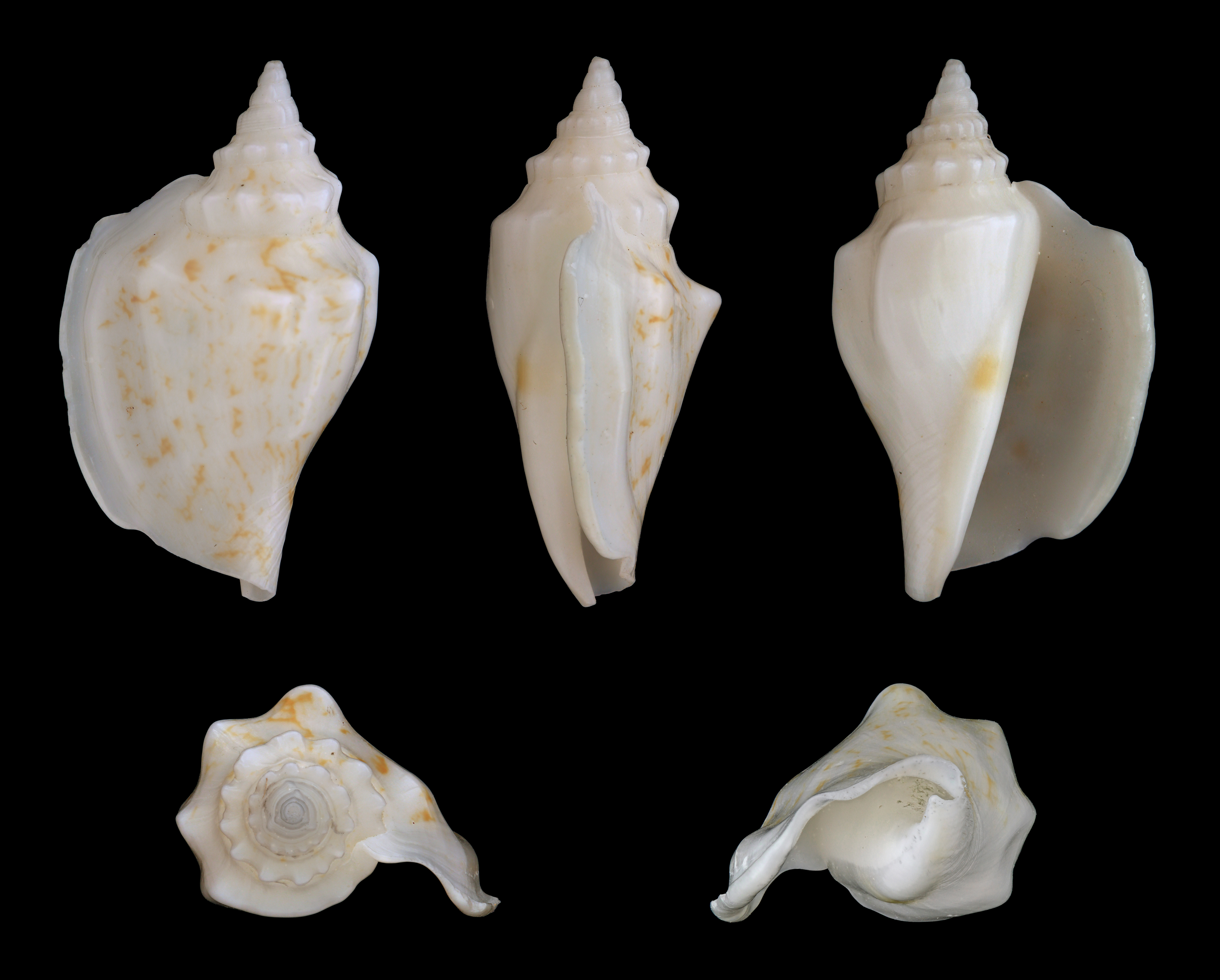
- Five views of a shell of Ministrombus variabilis

Scientific classification
- Kingdom: Animalia
- Phylum: Mollusca
- Class: Gastropoda
- Subclass: Caenogastropoda
- Order: Littorinimorpha
- Family: Strombidae
- Genus: Ministrombus
- Species: M. variabilis

Binomial name
- Ministrombus variabilis (Swainson, 1820)

Synonyms
- Dolomena (Ministrombus) variabilis (Swainson, 1820); Dolomena variabilis (Swainson, 1820) superseded combination; Dolomena variabilis variabilis (Swainson, 1820)· accepted, alternate representation; Strombus (Dolomena) variabilis Swainson, 1820; Strombus (Dolomena) variabilis var. palauensis Romagna-Manoja, 1974 (unavailable name under Art. 15.1 and 15.2 of the ICZN); Strombus (Dolomena) variabilis variabilis Swainson, 1820; Strombus lituratus Menke, 1829 (dubious synonym); Strombus variabilis Swainson, 1820 (basionym)

= Ministrombus variabilis =

Species of gastropod

Ministrombus variabilis, the variable conch, is a species of sea snail, a marine gastropod mollusk in the family Strombidae, the true conchs.

== Description ==
The shell size varies between 25 mm and 60 mm.

== Distribution ==
This species is distributed in the Pacific Ocean along the Philippines, Samoa, Indonesia and Northeast Australia. There have been a total of 516 occurrences, 219 of them being from Australia.
