= Cape Gloucester, Queensland =

Cape Gloucester
- Suburb
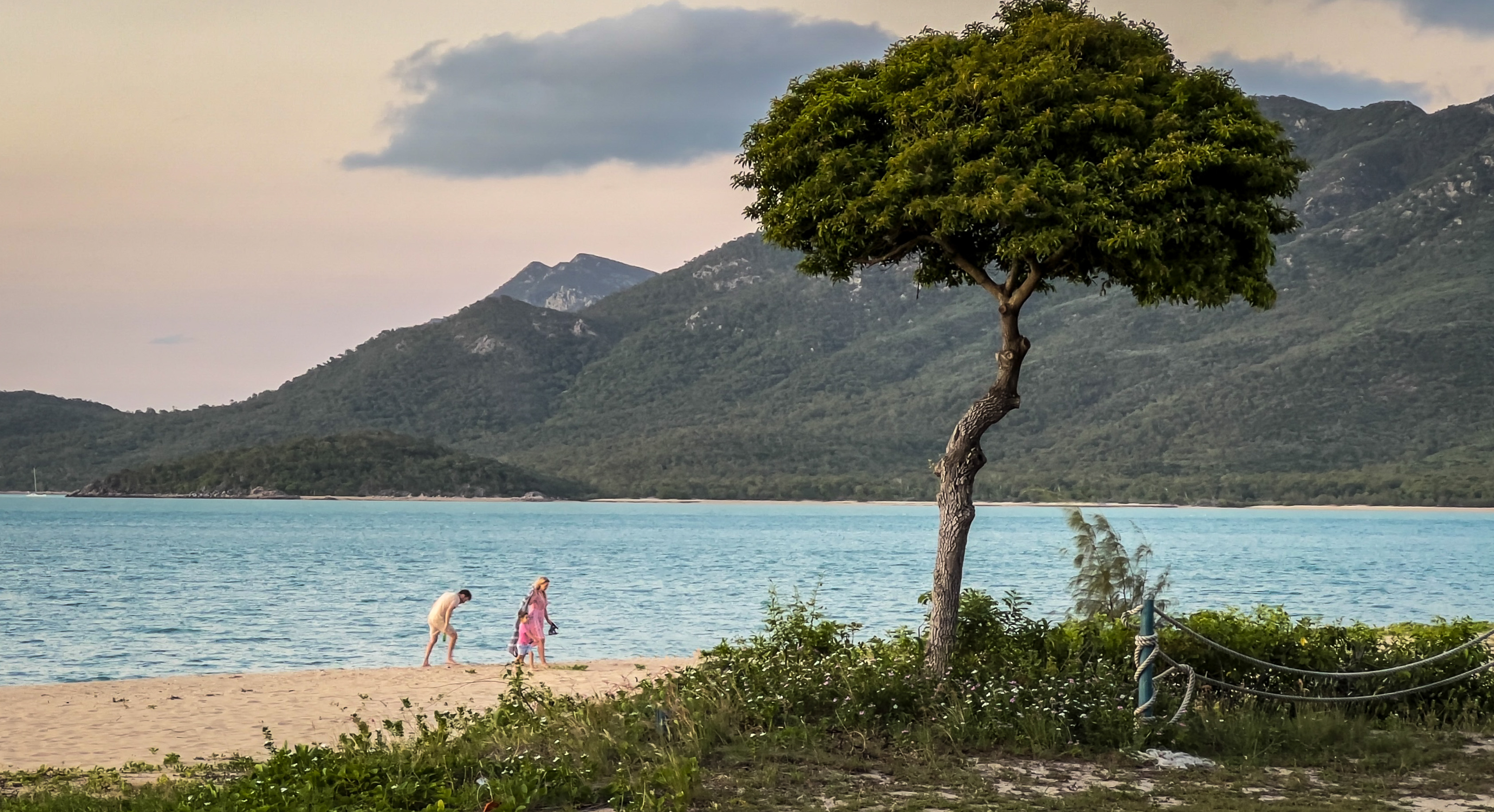
- Gloucester Passage, 2022

- Interactive map of Cape Gloucester
- Coordinates: 20.1622°S 148.5286°E
- Country: Australia
- State: Queensland
- LGA: Whitsunday Region
- Location: 40.2 km (25.0 mi) N of Proserpine; 165 km (103 mi) NNW of Mackay; 270 km (170 mi) SE of Townsville; 1,141 km (709 mi) NNW of Brisbane

Government
  - State electorate: Whitsunday
  - Federal division: Dawson

Area
  - Total: 228.2 km^{2} (88.1 sq mi)

Population
  - Total: 85 (2021 census)
  - Density: 0.3725/km^{2} (0.965/sq mi)
- Time zone: UTC+10:00 (AEST)
- Postcode: 4800
Suburbs around Cape Gloucester
Coral Sea	Hideaway Bay; Dingo Beach	Coral Sea
Gregory River	Cape Gloucester	Coral Sea
Gregory River	Gregory River	Woodwark

Cape Gloucester is a coastal rural locality in the Whitsunday Region, Queensland, Australia. In the 2021 census Cape Gloucester had a population of 85 people.

== Geography ==
Two parts of the Dryander National Park are in the east and south of the locality. Apart from these protected areas, the predominant land use is grazing on native vegetation. There are houses dotted along the coastline and along Hydeaway Bay Road (mostly on rural residential blocks).

=== Coastal features ===
The locality has the following coastal features, clockwise:

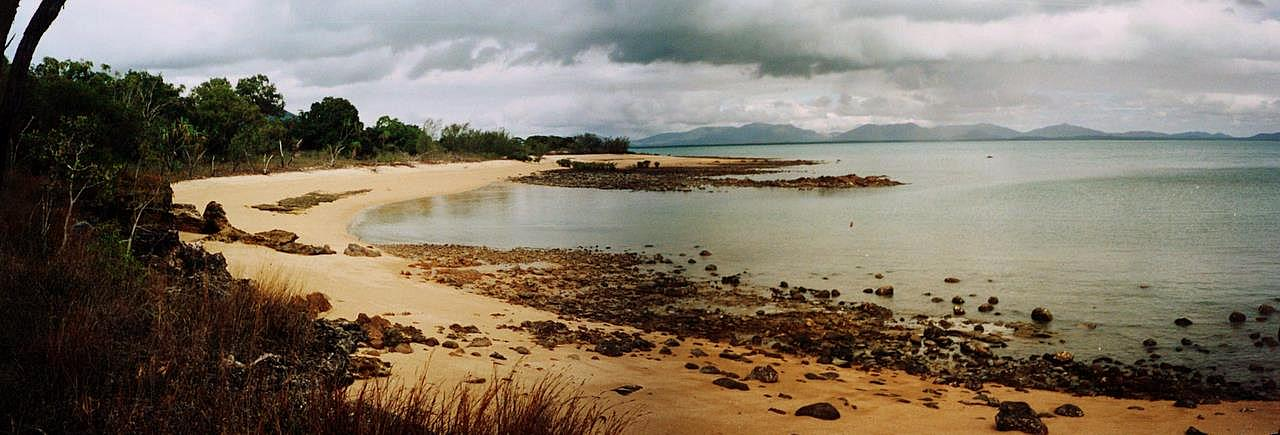
Edgecumbe Bay, from north of Sinclair Bay

- Edgecumbe Bay (20.1137°S 148.3902°E)
- Sinclair Bay (also known as Sinclaire Bay) (20.1136°S 148.4544°E).
- Cape Gloucester (20.0606°S 148.4533°E)
- Gloucester Passage (20.0573°S 148.4617°E)
- Shoal Bay (20.0775°S 148.4862°E)
- George Point (20.0678°S 148.5626°E)
- Double Bay (20.1908°S 148.6116°E)

=== Mountains ===
The locality has the following mountains:

- Ben Lomond (Sugar Loaf) (20.1568°S 148.4484°E) 429 metres (1,407 ft)
- Cork Hills (20.1928°S 148.4978°E) 165 metres (541 ft)

== History ==
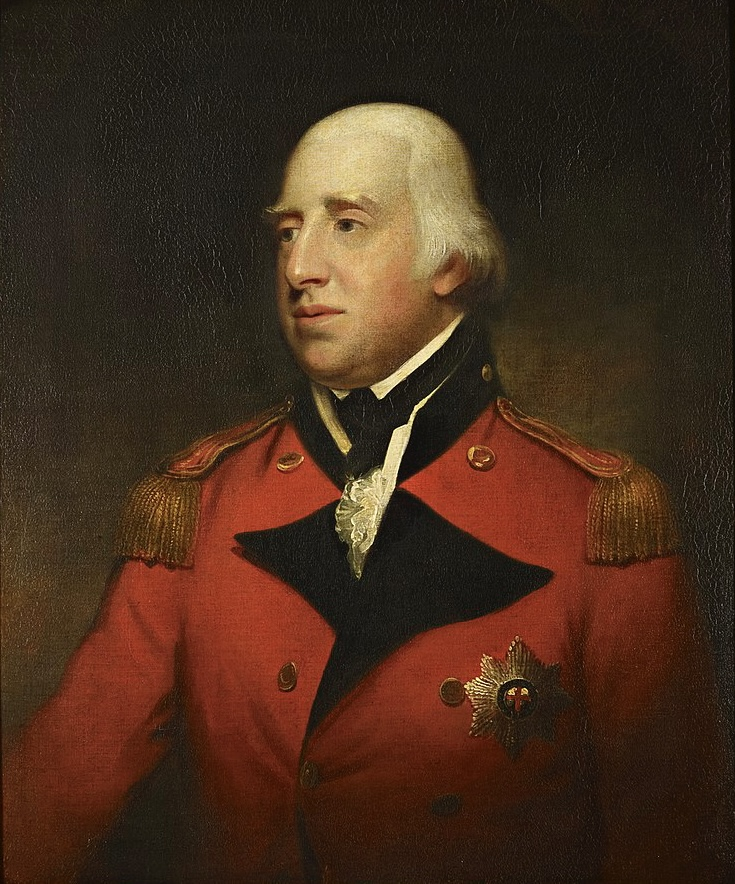
William Henry, Duke of Gloucester

The locality is named after the cape, which was in turn named after William Henry, Duke of Gloucester and Edinburgh, on 4 June 1770 by Lieutenant James Cook of HMS Endeavour.

== Demographics ==
In the 2016 census, Cape Gloucester had a population of 62 people.

In the 2021 census, Cape Gloucester had a population of 85 people.

== Education ==
There are no schools in Cape Gloucester. The nearest government primary school is Proserpine State School in Proserpine to the south. The nearest government secondary school is Proserpine State High School, also in Proserpine.
