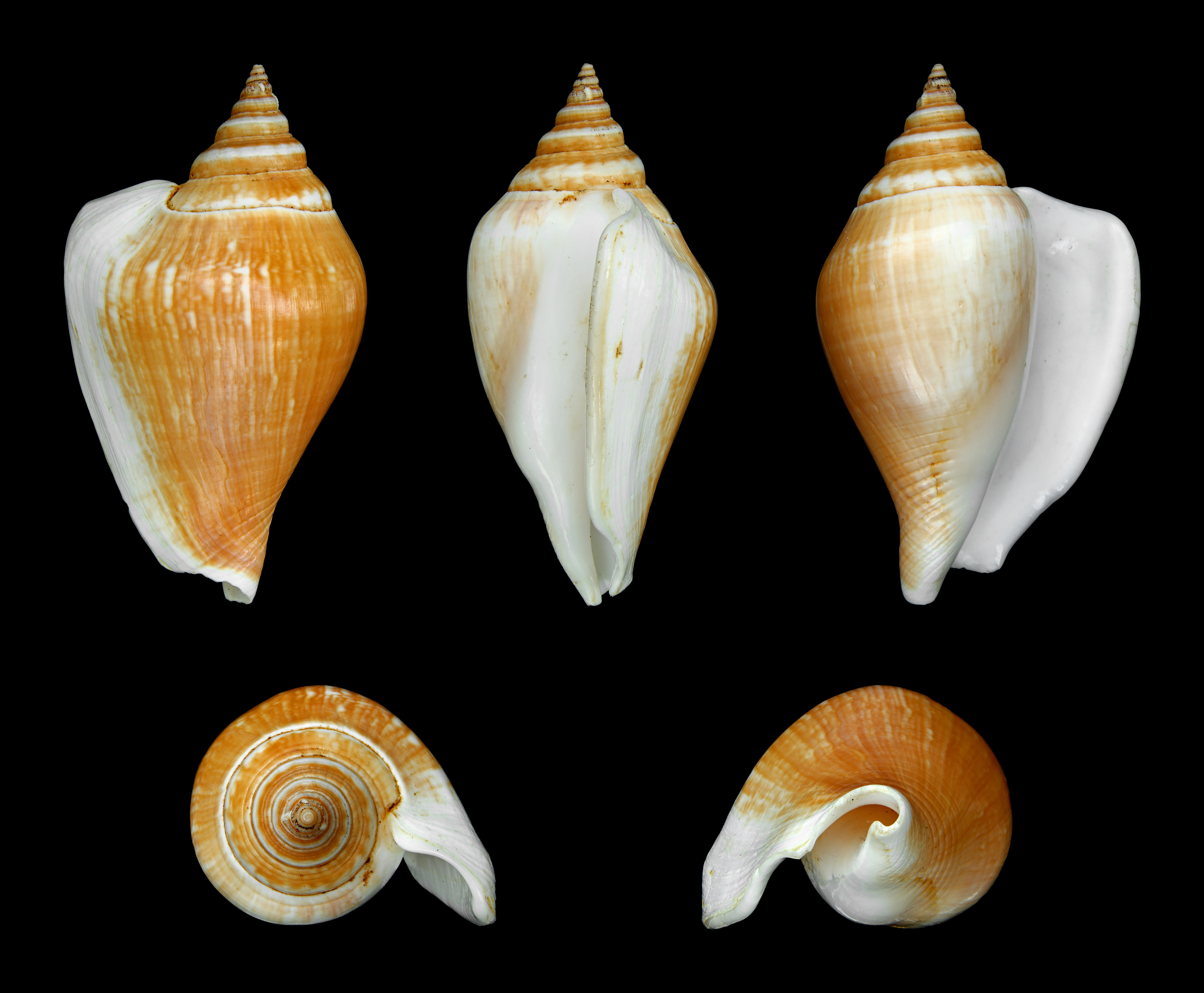
- Five different views of Dolomena turturella: abapertural (upper left), right lateral (center), apertural (upper right), apical (lower left) and basal (lower right)

Scientific classification
- Kingdom: Animalia
- Phylum: Mollusca
- Class: Gastropoda
- Subclass: Caenogastropoda
- Order: Littorinimorpha
- Family: Strombidae
- Genus: Dolomena
- Species: D. turturella

Binomial name
- Dolomena turturella (Röding, 1798)

Synonyms
- Laevistrombus (Gonggongus) turturella (Röding, 1798) alternative representation; Laevistrombus turturella (Röding, 1798) superseded combination; Lambis turturella Röding, 1798 (original combination); Strombus (Strombus) isabella Lamarck, 1822 ·; Strombus isabella Lamarck, 1822; Strombus turturella (Röding, 1798) ·

= Dolomena turturella =

Species of gastropod

Dolomena turturella is a species of sea snail, a marine gastropod mollusc in the family Strombidae (true conches).

== Distribution ==
D. turturella is widely distributed and has been sampled and observed across Taiwan, Vietnam, Philippines, Indonesia, Thailand, Singapore, Malaysia, Papua New Guinea, Japan.

Sparse records are also available of species presence from occurrence information in the Global Biodiversity Information Facility database for India (4 records), Guam and Sri Lanka (3 records), and singular records for United Arab Emirates, American Samoa, Australia, China, Hong Kong, New Caledonia, Panama, Palau, and Vanuatu.

== Taxonomy ==
There is some disagreement in the literature as to whether or not this taxon and the similar-looking Laevistrombus canarium are actually separate species. Man In 'T Veld & Turck (1998) considered that L. canarium and L. turturella are distinct (yet sympatric) species, based mainly on the shell morphology and a radula comparison. However, when Cob et al. reviewed a number of Strombus species in 2009, examining both shell characters and anatomical data including details of the genitalia, operculum and radula, he concluded that L. turturella was simply a morphotype, and therefore a synonym of L. canarium. In 2019, Maxwell et al. examined the early teleoconch (upper post-larval shell spiral) morphology of specimens of Laevistrombus species; they treated L. turturella as a valid species, and elevated several names synonymized with L. canarium or L. turturella to full species status.
