= Seafish Tasmania =

Australian fisheries company

- Industry: Fisheries
- Headquarters: Triabunna, Tasmania, Australia
- Key people: Dirk Parlevliet; Jan van der Plas; Dirk van der Plas; Gerald Geen
- Owner: Parlevliet and Van der Plas
- Website: http://www.seafishpelagic.com.au

Seafish Tasmania is an Australian privately owned fisheries company based in Triabunna, Tasmania.

It is not to be confused with the newsletter of the same name.

== Super trawlers ==
In 2010 the company ceased its operation of small fishing vessels claiming the venture was not profitable, attempting in 2012 to fish Australian waters using super trawlers, large factory ships owned by Dutch company Parlevliet & van der Plas with the ability to freeze catches onboard, requiring less returns to shore.

It has had rights to fishing in federal legislative constraints in 2010, however the company attempts to introduce super trawlers have been problematic.

In 2012 Federal politicians saw the expansion of the company in a positive light.

In 2012, Seafish Tasmania was provided with a $420,000 government grant to produce locally made fish oil for human consumption.

The super trawler FV Margiris, at the time the second largest fishing vessel in the world, was brought into Australian waters in 2012 and renamed Abel Tasman.

On 11 September 2012, the Minister for Agriculture and Water Resources Tony Burke tabled a bill in parliament to ban super trawlers from operating in Australian waters for a two year period, claiming further research was needed on their impact to the environment. Senator Eric Abetz said he believed Seafish Tasmania would be able to claim damages due to the decision to ban their trawler from operating.

In 2015, the much smaller Dirk Diederik KW 172 was brought to Australia and renamed as FV Geelong Star, both meeting with controversy before departing Australia.

The issues arising from the Margiris event saw a legislative catchup occur, and the company welcoming improved regulations.

The company attempted to challenge bans on super trawlers in the Federal Court of Australia, resulting in their application being dismissed with costs.

== Controversy ==
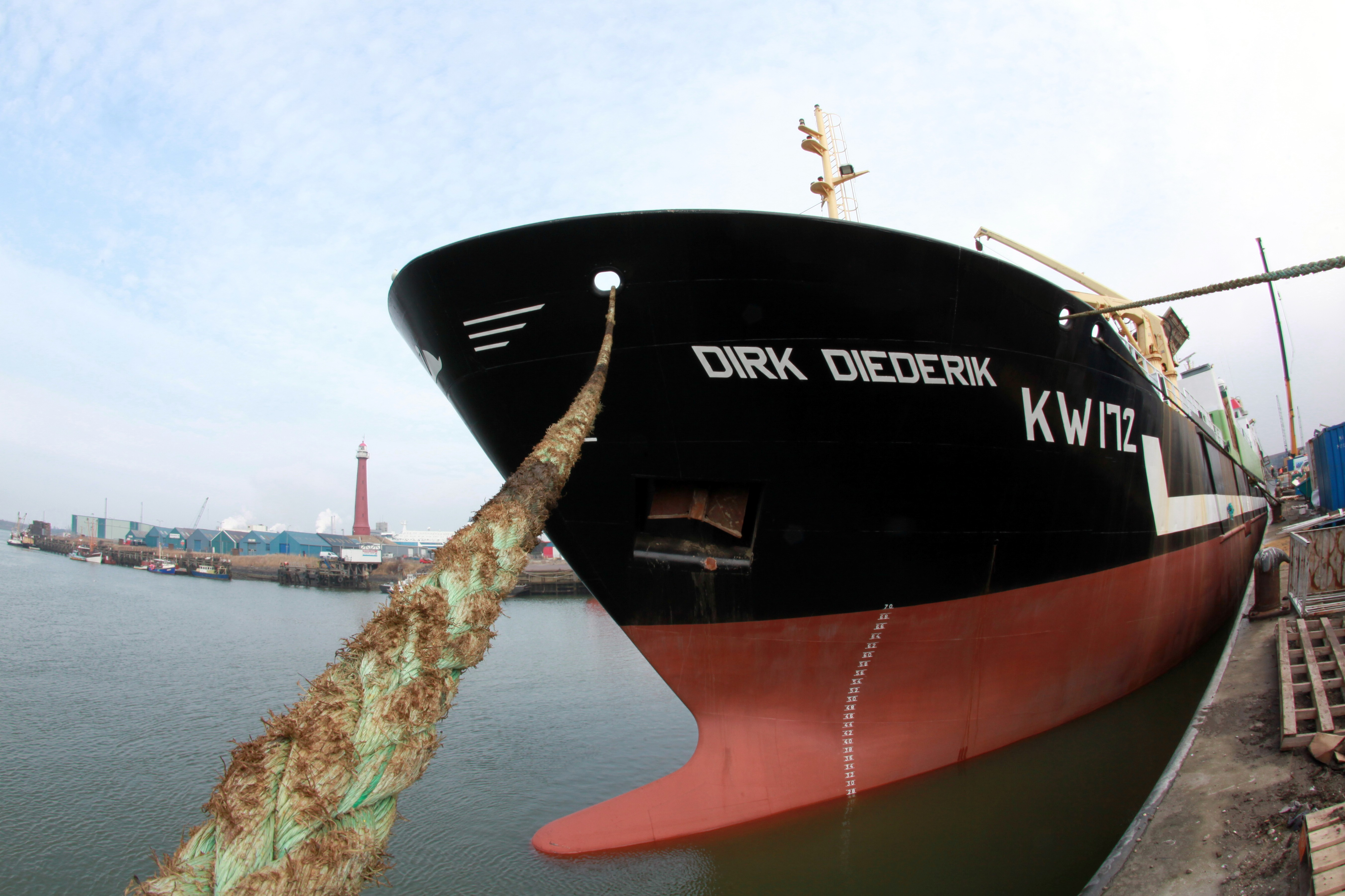
The Dirk Diederik KW 172, renamed FV Geelong Star during its time in Australia.

On 10 March 2016, the company was fined $40,000 after pleading guilty in the Hobart Magistrates Court for the unlawful disposal of more than 1,200 truckloads of fish processing waste from its fish processing plant at Triabunna, occurring during 2012. The fine was not paid and the company was listed on the debtors list of the Department of Justice website. The Environmental Protection Authority estimated costs of their investigation to exceed $100,000 and the land owner had paid $21,000 to cleanup the site.

The company recorded seven convictions relating to environmental issues between 2011 and 2013.

During June 2016, Seafish Tasmania objected to the release of video footage of a dolphin being captured in the nets of the Geelong Star super trawler, claiming the footage would cause damage to their business reputation and incite environmental activists to protest at the company's operations.

On 25 December 2016, a former managing director of Seafish Tasmania, Joseph Pirrello, was arrested on allegations of importing cocaine worth an estimated $360 million into Australia.
