= Dingo Beach, Queensland =

Dingo Beach
- Suburb
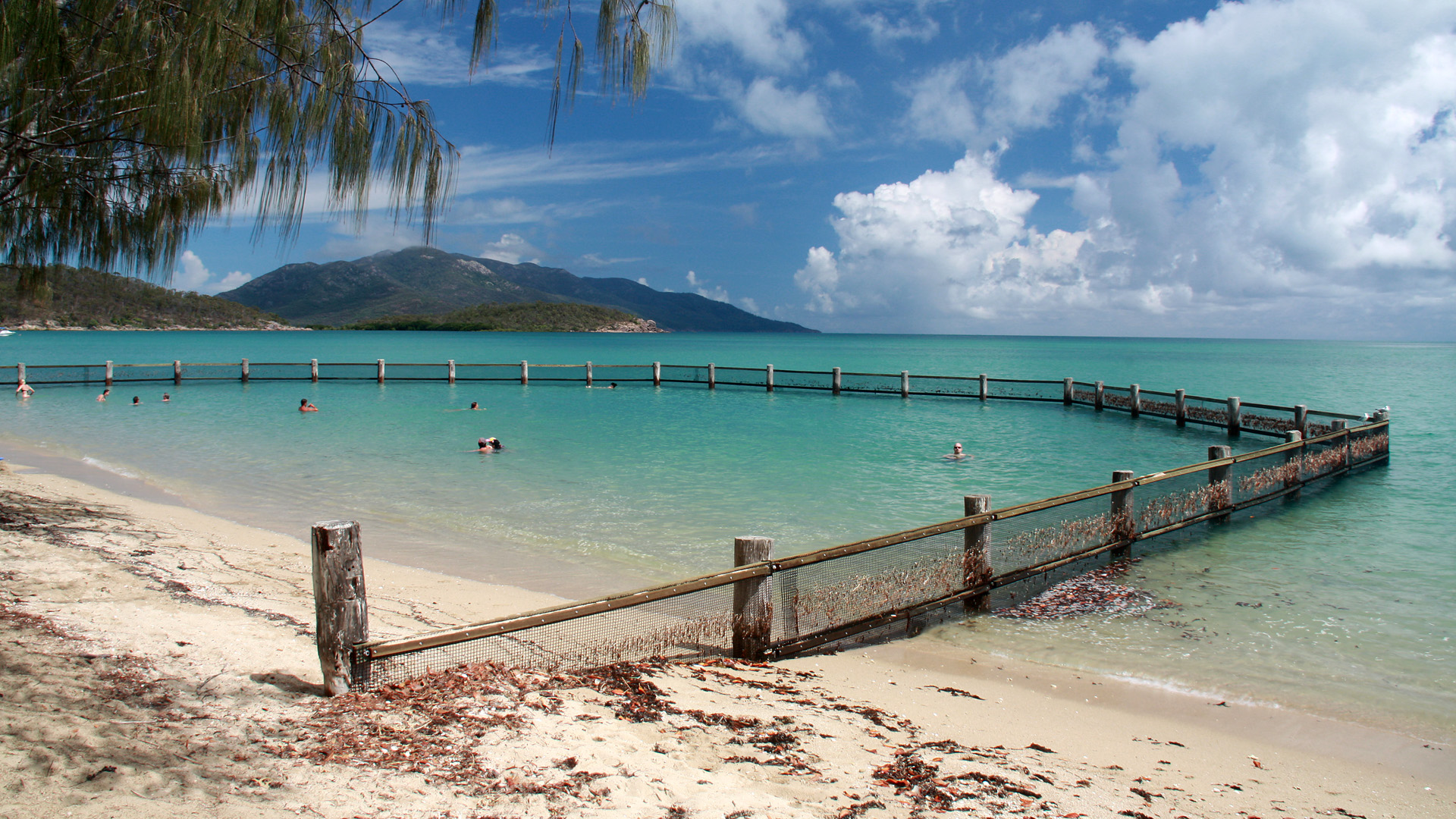
- Safe swimming enclosure, Dingo Beach, 2009

- Interactive map of Dingo Beach
- Coordinates: 20.0906°S 148.49812°E
- Country: Australia
- State: Queensland
- LGA: Whitsunday Region
- Location: 40.7 km (25.3 mi) N of Proserpine; 166 km (103 mi) NNW of Mackay; 271 km (168 mi) SE of Townsville; 1,111 km (690 mi) NNW of Brisbane

Government
  - State electorate: Whitsunday
  - Federal division: Dawson

Area
  - Total: 2.2 km^{2} (0.85 sq mi)

Population
  - Total: 159 (2021 census)
  - Density: 72.3/km^{2} (187/sq mi)
- Time zone: UTC+10:00 (AEST)
- Postcode: 4800
Suburbs around Dingo Beach
Hideaway Bay	Coral Sea	Coral Sea
Cape Gloucester	Dingo Beach	Coral Sea
Cape Gloucester	Cape Gloucester	Cape Gloucester

Dingo Beach is a coastal rural locality and beach in the Whitsunday Region, Queensland, Australia. In the 2021 census, Dingo Beach had a population of 159 people.

== Geography ==
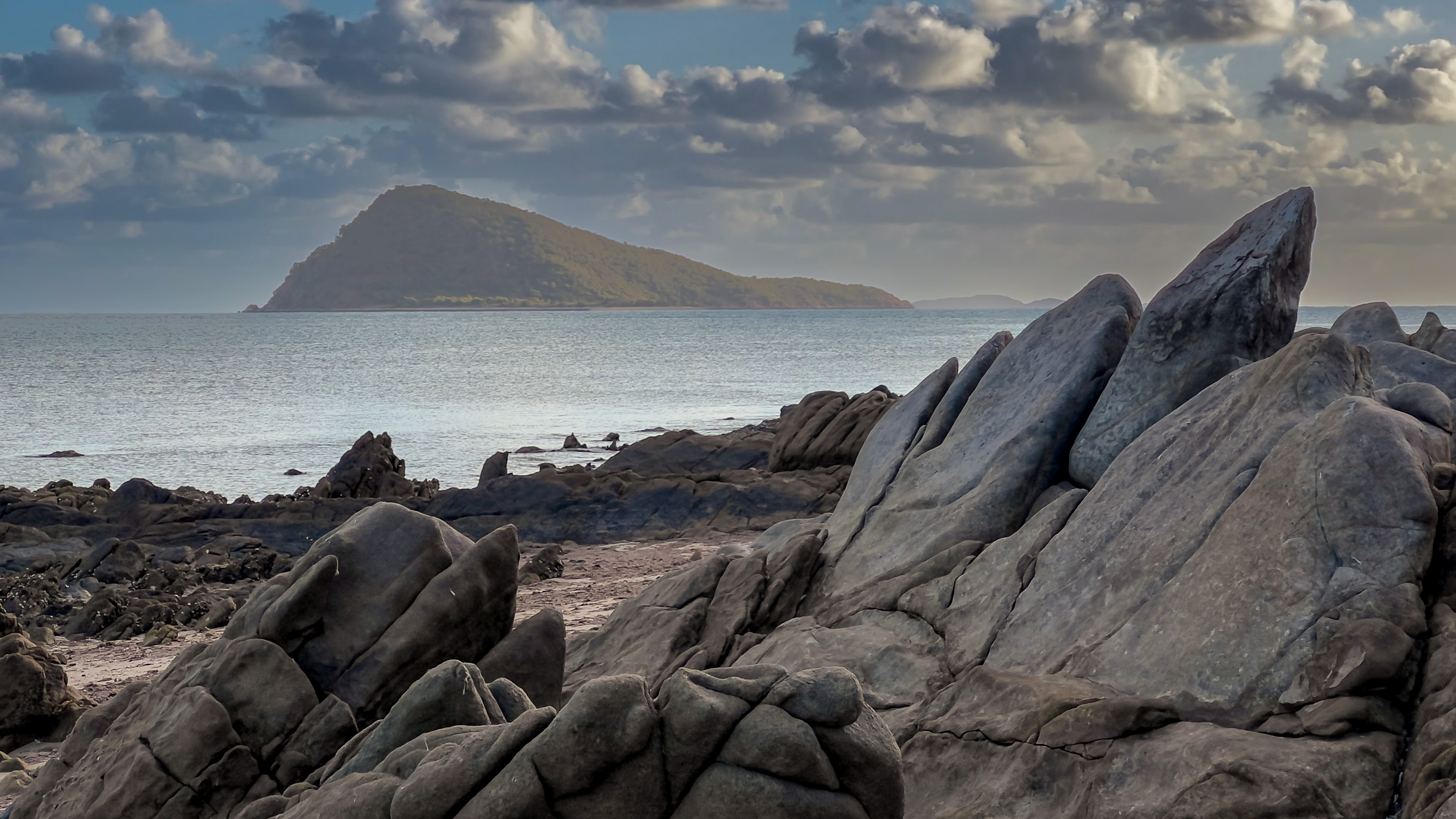
Dingo Beach, 2022

The Coral Sea forms the northern boundary of the locality. Along the coast are (from west to east):

- Shoal Bay, at the north-west of the locality (20.0775°S 148.4862°E)
- Black Currant Island, a 7.2-hectare (18-acre) marine island (20.0799°S 148.4927°E)
- Dingo Beach (the beach) (20.0894°S 148.4974°E)
- Manta Ray Island, a 5.7-hectare (14-acre) marine island (20.0787°S 148.5126°E)
- Nelly Bay, at the north-east of the locality (20.0909°S 148.5133°E)

The only road access to the locality is Dingo Beach Road, which connects via a short segment of Gregory River Road to the Bruce Highway in the locality of Gregory River.

There is a residential area along the beach Dingo Beach. Apart from this, the land use is predominantly grazing on native vegetation.

== History ==
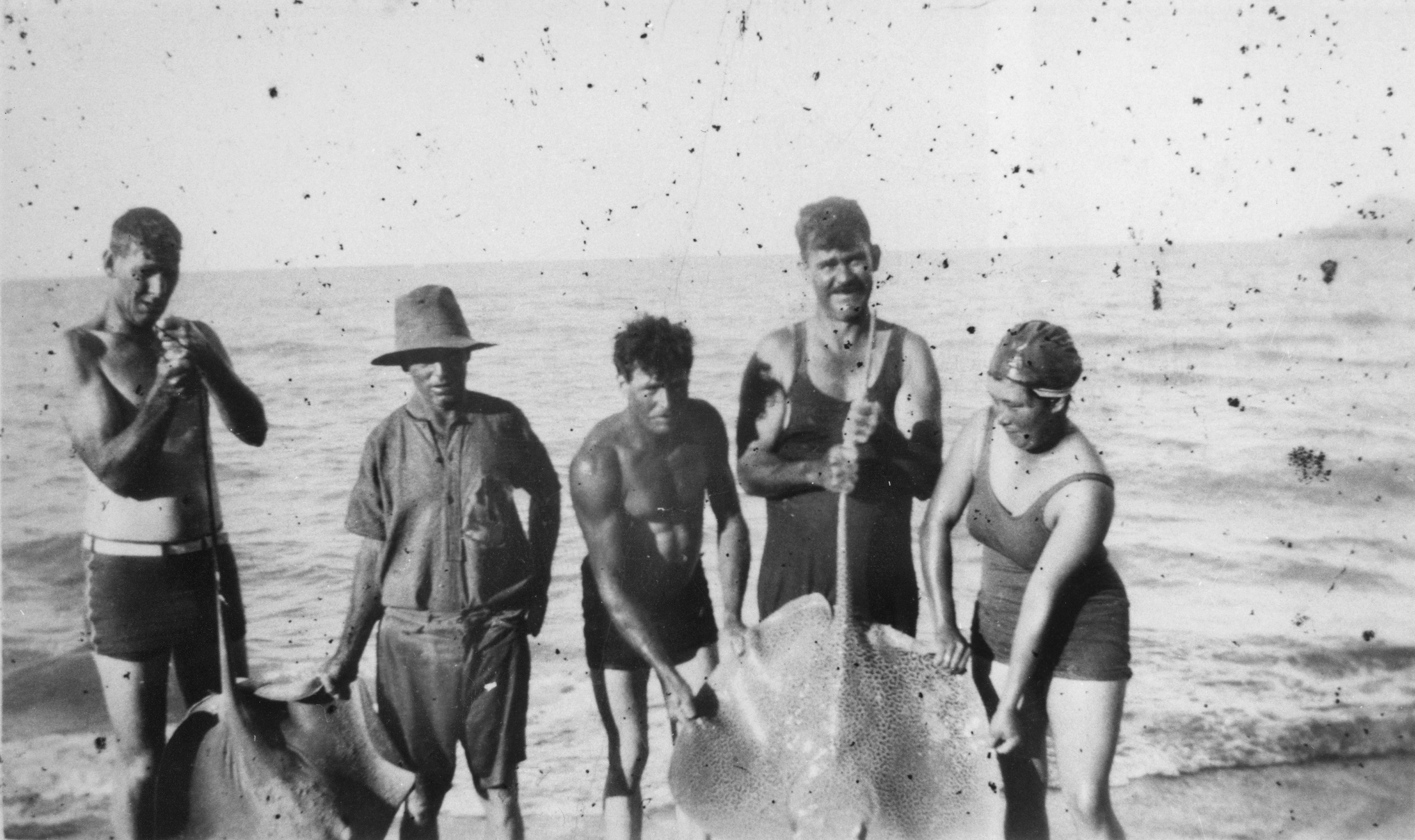
Fishermen posing with stingrays at Dingo Beach, circa 1925

In 1926, the area was named Dingo Beach. People from Proserpine and Bowen then began using the beach for recreation. The road was described as being very rough. It officially became a town in 1966.

== Demographics ==
In the 2016 census, Dingo Beach had a population of 169 people.

In the 2021 census, Dingo Beach had a population of 159 people.

== Education ==
There are no schools in Dingo Beach. The nearest government primary and secondary schools are Proserpine State School and Proserpine State High School respectively, both in Proserpine to the south. There is also a Catholic primary-and-secondary school in Proserpine.

== Amenities ==
Dingo Beach boat ramp into the Coral Sea is off Deicke Crescent (20.0902°S 148.4990°E). It is managed by the Whitsunday Regional Council.

== Facilities ==
Gloucester SES Facility is an operational state emergency service facility at 10 Dingo Beach Road (20.0934°S 148.4965°E).
