= Australian Fisheries Management Authority =

Australian government agency

- Logo of the Australian Fisheries Management Authority

Agency overview
- Formed: 1992
- Employees: 197 (2015)
- Parent department: Department of Agriculture, Fisheries and Forestry

The Australian Fisheries Management Authority (AFMA) is the Australian Government agency responsible for the management and sustainable use of fisheries resources including combating illegal fishing activities in the Australian Fishing Zone that covers 8,148,250 square kilometres, the third largest in the world, and in most of Australia's Exclusive Economic Zone, which extends to 200 nautical miles (370 km) from the coastline of Australia and its external territories, except where a maritime delimitation agreement exists with a state. AFMA is an agency of the Australian Department of Agriculture, Fisheries and Forestry. The Authority does not have a legal identity separate from the Commonwealth.

== History ==
The Australian Fishing Zone (AFZ) was first declared in 1979, and covers Australian waters, generally from 3 nautical miles to 200 nautical miles from the Australian coast. To the 3 nautical miles boundary are state waters and fisheries are managed by the respective states.

The Australian Fisheries Management Authority was established in February 1992 and its operations are governed by the Australian Fisheries Administration Act 1991 (Cth) and Fisheries Management Act 1991 (Cth).

Australia declared an Exclusive Economic Zone (EEZ) on 1 August 1994, which extends to 200 nautical miles from its coastline. To the 12 nautical miles boundary is Australia's territorial waters.

== Current responsibilities ==
Maritime Zones under International Law

AFMA manages Commonwealth fisheries that are typically within the 200-nautical-mile (370 km) Australian Fishing Zone (AFZ), on the high seas, and, in some cases, by agreement with other Australian States to the low water mark.

The agency is also responsible for combating illegal fishing in Australia's Exclusive Economic Zone including the waters between Australia and Indonesia and in the Southern Ocean and the Australian territories of Ashmore and Cartier Islands and Heard Island and McDonald Islands. This activity is conducted with the assistance of the Australian Border Force and the Royal Australian Navy.

== Agency structure ==
AFMA operates under the direction of a Commission and a chief executive officer, who is also a Commissioner.

The commission is responsible for domestic fisheries management while the chief executive officer is responsible for foreign fisheries compliance, under direction from the Australian Government

All Commissioners, apart from the CEO, are appointed on a remunerated, part-time basis. The current Chair of the commission is Helen Kroger. Helen has held leadership positions in the private, public and not for profit sectors for the last 20 years. She is a former Liberal Senator for Victoria, Government Whip and active former member of numerous key Senate and Joint Committees. She has extensive board experience and advises corporations on regulatory and compliance, governance, communications and stakeholder management issues.

=== Enforcement Officers ===
AFMA employs officers under the Fisheries Management Act to undertake enforcement duties, these officers work both independently and closely with Maritime Border Command, the Royal Australian Navy, and Australian Border Force officers to enforce fisheries laws. AFMA officers are empowered to make arrests for fisheries offenses and certain other commonwealth laws, may conduct searches in certain circumstances, and are authorised to carry body armour, a telescopic baton, handcuffs, and other defensive equipment.

AFMA officers may conduct investigations and can apply for and execute warrants in relation to fisheries laws.

== See also ==
- Australian Border Force
- Fisheries management
- Seafood in Australia
