= FV Margiris =

Fishing trawler and factory ship

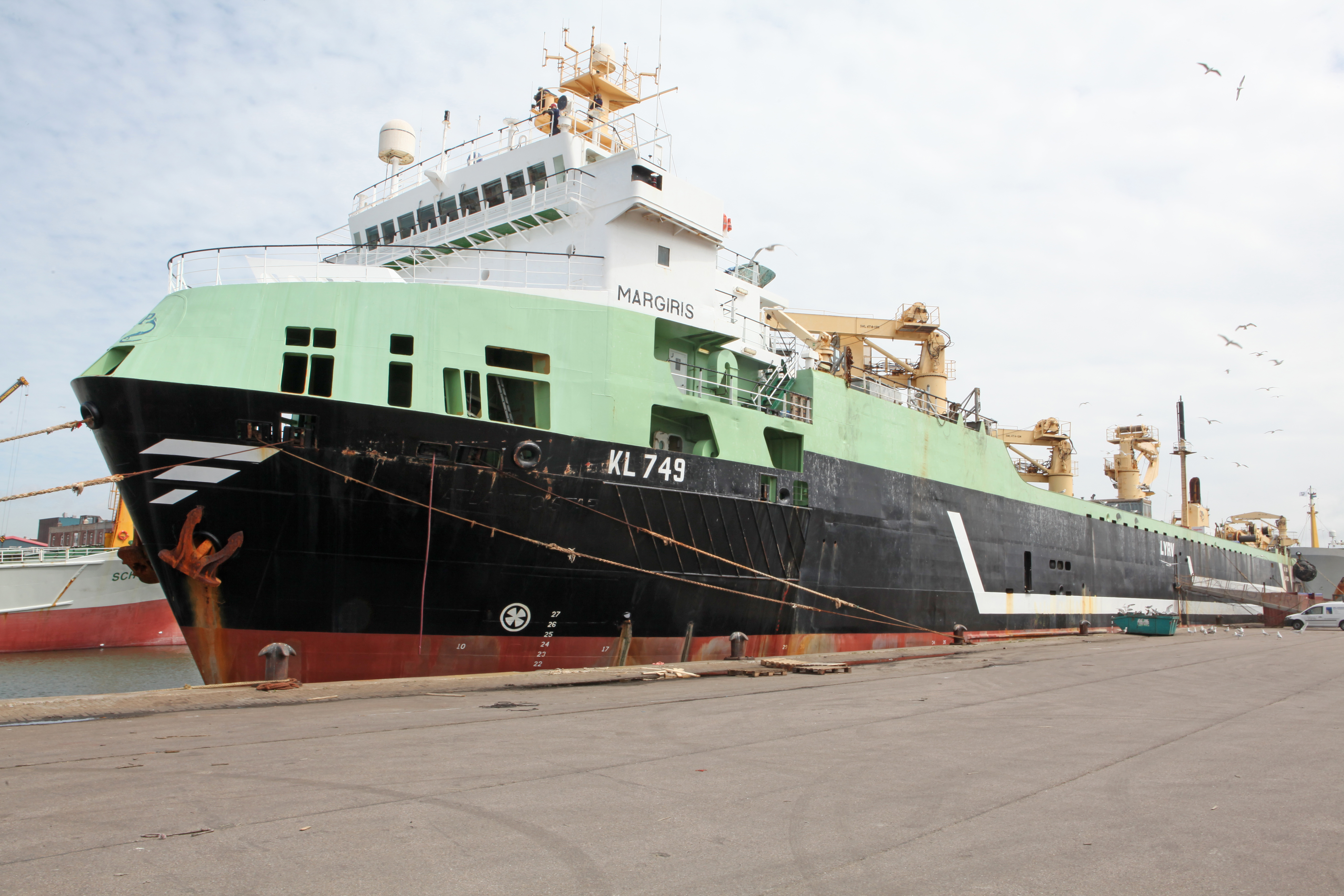

History

Lithuania
- Name: Margiris; Abel Tasman (2012 – 2013); Margiris (? – 2012); Annelies Ilena (2006 – ?); Atlantic Star (1999 – 2006); Siberian Enterprise (1998 – 1999); Apollo Two (1997 – 1998)
- Builder: Tacoma Boatbuilding Company, (Mjellem & Karlsen Verft, Bergen, Norway 1997 rebuild)
- Launched: 12 March 1985
- Renamed: Margiris
- Homeport: Klaipėda
- Identification: IMO number: 8301187; MMSI number: 277330000; Call sign: LYRV
- Status: In service

General characteristics
- Class & type: Super Trawler
- Tonnage: 9,499 GT; 6,200 DWT
- Length: 136.1 m (447 ft)
- Beam: 18 m (59 ft)
- Draught: 5.5 m (18 ft)
- Decks: 32

FV Margiris is the world's second largest fishing boat. It is a 9,500 GT super trawler and factory ship.

== To Australia as Abel Tasman ==
In 2012, Seafish Tasmania brought the ship (then named the Abel Tasman) to Australia. She was originally authorized to catch a quota of 18,000 tonnes of jack mackerel and redbait along the southern shores of the country.

After protests against her use by environmental and fishing industry groups, the Australian government passed legislation prohibiting the trawler from fishing in Australian waters for two years. For this reason, Seafish Tasmania subsequently sold its stake in the vessel to Dutch company Parlevliet & Van der Plas. On 6 March 2013, after six months moored in Australian waters, she left Port Lincoln, having reassumed her original name of Margiris.

After leaving Australian waters, the vessel passed through Cook Strait, New Zealand on 20 March 2013. She was now flagged to Lithuania and owned by Atlantic High Sea Fishing Company.

== Subsequent issues ==
Margiris arrived in Port of Penco, Chile on 7 April 2013. The vessel did not berth and steamed out of the bay to fish.

The Super Trawler issue was subject to a court challenge in 2014 and an Australian Government scientific report published in late 2014. Before and after this report there was reaffirmation that super trawlers over 130 metres, like Margiris, would not be permitted under Australia's environmental protection law, yet controversy continues in Australia about factory-fishing boats.

In late October 2015, the Margiris was fishing off the North west coast of Ireland. The Irish naval service fisheries inspectors refused to board her at sea, due to adverse weather condition. She had departed the waters shortly before the weather improved. In November 2016, the Margiris entered Irish water. The ship had been active for a day when it was boarded by an Irish Naval Service fisheries inspection team.

In February 2022, the Margiris shed over 100,000 dead fish into the Atlantic Ocean off France, covering an area in excess of 3,000 sq m. A representative of the ship's owners stated that it was due to a net break but Sea Shepherd France, a marine conservation organization, said it did not believe the incident was accidental, but rather an attempt by the trawler to discharge a type of fish that it did not want to process, a practice known as discharging bycatch which is banned under EU fishing rules.

== See also ==
- Naeraberg
