= Northern bluefin tuna =

Several fish species are known as northern bluefin tuna, including:

- Atlantic bluefin tuna (Thunnus thynnus)
- Pacific bluefin tuna (Thunnus orientalis)
- Thunnus tonggol, or longtail tuna, known as the northern bluefin tuna in Australia

== See also ==
- Southern bluefin tuna
