= Bluefin tuna =

Bluefin tuna is a common name used to refer to several species of tuna of the genus Thunnus.

Species	Common name	Image	Range	Note
T. maccoyii	Southern bluefin tuna		found in southern hemisphere waters of all the world's oceans	
T. orientalis	Pacific bluefin tuna		found widely in the northern Pacific Ocean and locally in the south	Formerly known as northern bluefin tuna.
T. thynnus	Atlantic bluefin tuna		found in both the western and eastern Atlantic Ocean, and also in the Mediterranean Sea	Formerly known as northern bluefin tuna.
T. tonggol	Longtail tuna		found in tropical Indo-West Pacific waters	Known as the northern bluefin tuna in Australia, as it is found off their northern coast.
