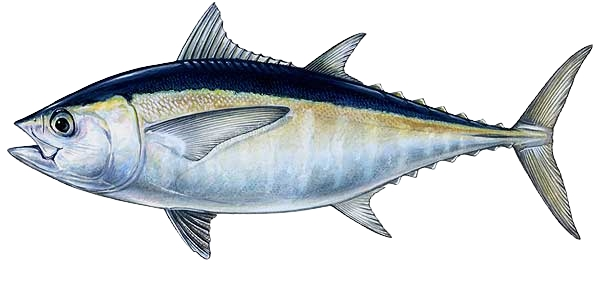

Conservation status
- Least Concern (IUCN 3.1)

Scientific classification
- Kingdom: Animalia
- Phylum: Chordata
- Class: Actinopterygii
- Order: Scombriformes
- Family: Scombridae
- Genus: Thunnus
- Subgenus: Neothunnus
- Species: T. atlanticus

Binomial name
- Thunnus atlanticus (Lesson, 1831)

Synonyms
- Thynnus atlanticus Lesson, 1831; Parathunnus atlanticus (Lesson, 1831); Scomber coretta Cuvier, 1829; Thunnus coretta (Cuvier, 1829); Thynnus coretta (Cuvier, 1829); Thynnus balteatus Cuvier, 1832; Orcynus balteatus (Cuvier, 1832); Thunnus balteatus (Cuvier, 1832); Parathunnus rosengarteni Fowler, 1934; Parathunnus ambiguus Mowbray, 1935

= Blackfin tuna =

Species of fish

The blackfin tuna (Thunnus atlanticus) is a species of tuna in the family Scombridae. It is occasionally referred to as the Bermuda tuna, blackfinned albacore, or deep bodied tunny. They are the smallest tuna species in the genus Thunnus, generally growing to a maximum of 100 cm (39 in) in length and weighing 21 kg (46 lb).

Blackfin tuna are considered tropical, warm water fish. They have a relatively small distribution throughout the Eastern Coast of North and South America. They are located from Massachusetts to Rio de Janeiro in Brazil, and also inhabit the Gulf of Mexico and the Caribbean Sea.

The blackfin tuna has less commercial value than its close relatives like the yellowfin, bluefin, and skipjack tuna, but is still a major sport fish in Florida and regions of the Caribbean like Cuba and the Bahamas. However, the taste and quality of blackfin tuna is comparable to that of its popular relatives, and can be prepared in the same ways. It is also sushi grade. Methods of capture include trolling, drift fishing, and sport fishing with a pole and live bait or lures like ballyhoo, mullet, small fishes or strip baits, feathers, jigs, or plugs.

As of 2022, blackfin tuna were deemed "least concern" globally by the International Union for Conservation of Nature.

== Description ==
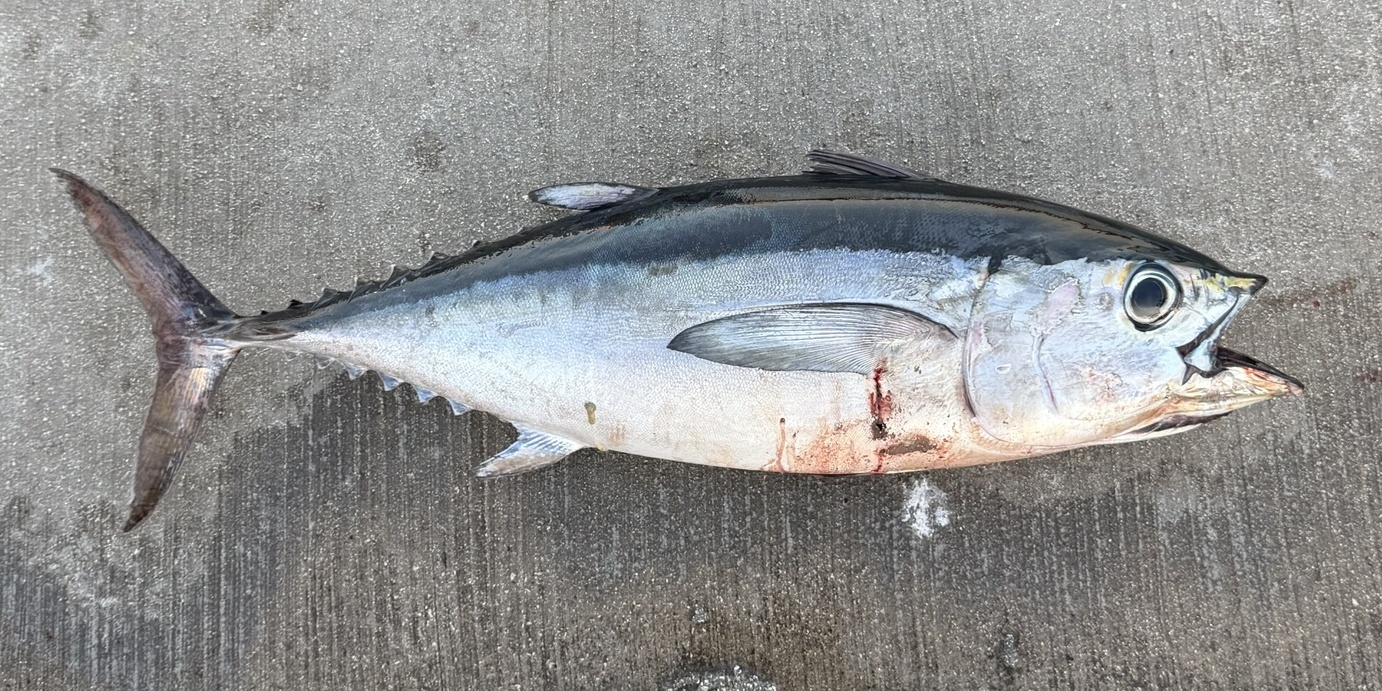
In Florida

Blackfin tuna are the smallest species of tuna. The All-Tackle world record blackfin tuna was caught off the coast of Florida and weighed 20.6 kg (45 lb 7 oz). Their oval shaped bodies have a dark blue to black colored back. The sides and belly of the fish are silver, which gives them an iridescent appearance in the water, with a lateral yellow stripe. They have durable, compact scales with an oblique mouth.

Blackfin tuna have small dorsal finlets with a brownish coloration and white edges, a distinguishing characteristic from the yellow dorsal fins seen in other types of tuna. These dorsal finlets draw a line between the two large dorsal fins and the tail. Blackfin tuna can also be distinguished from other types of tuna based on their number of gill rakers. Most species of tuna have a minimum of 30 gill rakers, while blackfin tuna only have 20–23, the fewest of all species. Additionally, blackfin tuna have a smooth ventral surface on their liver found in the chest cavity, while other species have striations on their ventral surface.

== Biology and ecology ==
Blackfin tuna hunt both epipelagic (surface) and mesopelagic (deeper water) fish and squid. They also eat crustaceans such as shrimp, crabs, amphipods, stomatopods, and the larvae of decapods. They consume smaller prey by filtering the water and chase to catch larger prey.

This species is host to parasites including certain Digenea, Monogenea, Cestoda, Nematoda and Crustacea. The latter group includes parasitic copepods like Caligus coryphaenae, Caligus productus, Euryporus brachypterus, and Pseudocycnus appendiculatus. Cookiecutter sharks (Isistius brasiliensis) are external parasites.

== Life history ==
They are a short-lived, fast-growing species; a five-year-old fish would be considered old. They reach sexual maturity at the age of two years when they weigh roughly 4–6 lbs. Juvenile stages of all tuna species are very similar due to close life histories, although the species have significant differences as adults.

Spawning typically occurs off the coast of Florida in the months between April and November. In the Gulf of Mexico and near northern Brazil spawning occurs from June to September. In fact, the Gulf of Mexico is thought to be one of the most ideal spawning sites for blackfin tuna. The physiochemical make-up of the Gulf of Mexico makes it an indispensable nursery habitat. One factor potentially influencing the favorable conditions of the Gulf of Mexico is the nutrient outflow from the Mississippi River; this outflow feeds the high metabolism of larval blackfin tuna.

Blackfin tuna are a warmer-water fish, preferring water temperatures over 20 °C (68 °F). The females release eggs into the water column to be fertilized by sperm. Fertilization of their eggs produces pelagic larvae which can be found on the surface of the water all the way to depths of 164 feet.

Blackfin tuna are preyed on by other, larger fish species such as mahi-mahi (Coryphaena hippurus), blue marlin (Makaira nigricans), and skipjack tuna (Katsuwonus pelamis). Various species of sea birds prey on blackfin tuna throughout their life cycle, and cannibalism has occurred as well.

== Sustainable consumption ==
In 2010, Greenpeace International did not add the blackfin tuna, unlike other tuna species, to its seafood red list.
