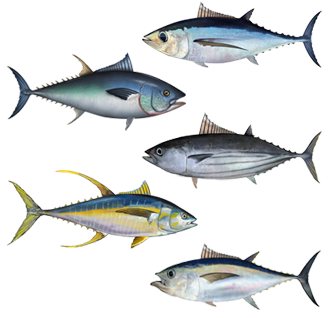
- Tunas (from top): albacore, Atlantic bluefin, skipjack, yellowfin, bigeye

Scientific classification
- Kingdom: Animalia
- Phylum: Chordata
- Class: Actinopterygii
- Division: Teleostei
- Order: Scombriformes
- Family: Scombridae
- Subfamily: Scombrinae
- Tribe: Thunnini; Starks, 1910

Genera
- Allothunnus: slender tunas; Auxis: frigate tunas; Euthynnus: little tunas; Katsuwonus: skipjack tunas; Thunnus: albacores, true tunas

= Tuna =

Tuna Temporal range: Ypresian-recent, 56.0–0 Ma

Tribe of fish

Tuna (pl.: tuna or tunas) are saltwater fish belonging to the tribe Thunnini, a subgrouping of the mackerel family (Scombridae). The Thunnini comprise 15 species across five genera, the sizes of which vary from the bullet tuna (max length 50 cm or 1.6 ft, weight 1.8 kg or 4 lb) to the Atlantic bluefin tuna (max length 4.6 m or 15 ft, weight 684 kg or 1,508 lb), which averages 2 m (6.6 ft) and is believed to live up to 40 years.

Tuna, opah, and mackerel sharks are the only species of fish that can maintain a body temperature higher than that of the surrounding water. Active and agile predators, tuna have a sleek, streamlined body, and are among the fastest-swimming pelagic fish — the yellowfin tuna, for example, is capable of speeds of up to 75 km/h (47 mph).

Found in warmer seas, tuna are commercially fished extensively as a food fish, and are popular as a bluewater game fish. As a result of overfishing, some tuna species, such as the southern bluefin tuna, are endangered.

== Etymology ==
The term "tuna" comes from Spanish atún < Andalusian Arabic at-tūn, assimilated from al-tūn التون [Modern Arabic التن]: 'tuna fish' < Middle Latin thunnus. Thunnus is derived from Ancient Greek: θύννος, romanized: thýnnos used for the Atlantic bluefin tuna, that name in turn is ultimately derived from θύνω thýnō 'to rush, dart along'.

A dated alternative term is "tunny".

In English, tuna has been referred to as Chicken of the Sea. This name persists today in Japan, where tuna as a food can be called シーチキン (shī chikin) 'sea chicken'.

== Description ==
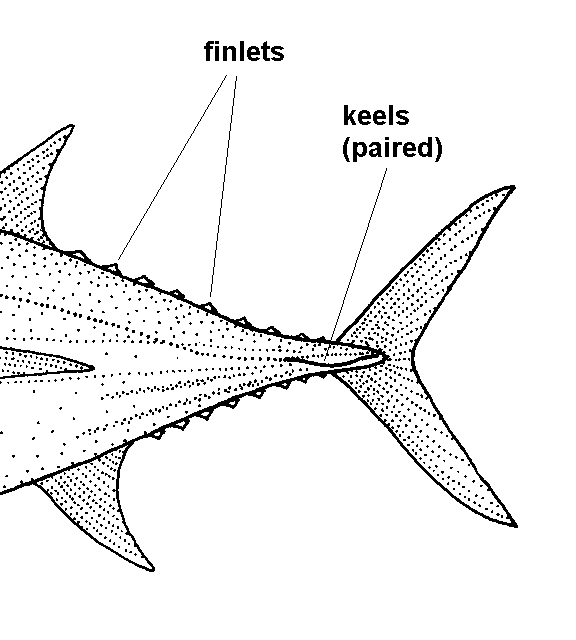
Bigeye tuna Thunnus obesus showing finlets and keels. Finlets are found between the last dorsal and/or anal fin and the caudal fin. They are rayless and non-retractable.

Tunas are sleek, elongated and streamlined fish, adapted for speed. They have two closely spaced but separated dorsal fins on its back; The first fin is "depressible" – it can be laid down, flush, in a groove that runs along its back, and is supported by spines. Seven to ten yellow finlets run from the dorsal fins to the tail, which is lunate – curved like a crescent moon – and tapered to pointy tips. A tuna's pelvic fins are located below the base of the pectoral fins. Both dorsal and pelvic fins retract when the fish is swimming fast.

The tuna's body is countershaded to camouflage itself in deeper water when seen from above, its dorsal side is generally a metallic dark blue while the ventral or under side is silvery, often with an iridescent shine. The caudal peduncle, to which the tail is attached, is quite thin, with three stabilizing horizontal keels on each side.

=== Physiology ===
Thunnus are widely but sparsely distributed throughout the oceans of the world, generally in tropical and temperate waters at latitudes ranging between about 45° north and south of the equator. All tunas are able to maintain the temperature of certain parts of their body above the temperature of ambient seawater. For example, bluefin can maintain a core body temperature of 25–33 °C (77–91 °F), in water as cold as 6 °C (43 °F). Unlike other endothermic creatures such as mammals and birds, tuna do not maintain temperature within a relatively narrow range.

Tunas achieve endothermy by conserving the heat generated through normal metabolism. In all tunas, the heart operates at ambient temperature, as it receives cooled blood, and coronary circulation is directly from the gills. The rete mirabile, the intertwining of veins and arteries in the body's periphery, allows nearly all of the metabolic heat from venous blood to be "re-claimed" and transferred to the arterial blood via a counter-current exchange system, thus mitigating the effects of surface cooling. This allows the tuna to elevate the temperatures of the highly-aerobic tissues of the skeletal muscles, eyes and brain, which supports faster swimming speeds and reduced energy expenditure, and which enables them to survive in cooler waters over a wider range of ocean environments than those of other fish.

Also unlike most fish, which have white flesh, the muscle tissue of tuna ranges from pink to dark red. The red myotomal muscles derive their color from myoglobin, an oxygen-binding molecule, which tuna express in quantities far higher than most other fish. The oxygen-rich blood further enables energy delivery to their muscles.

For powerful swimming animals like dolphins and tuna, cavitation may be detrimental, because it limits their maximum swimming speed. Even if they have the power to swim faster, dolphins may have to restrict their speed, because collapsing cavitation bubbles on their tail are too painful. Cavitation also slows tuna, but for a different reason. Unlike dolphins, these fish do not feel the bubbles, because they have bony fins without nerve endings. Nevertheless, they cannot swim faster because the cavitation bubbles create a vapor film around their fins that limits their speed. Lesions have been found on tuna that are consistent with cavitation damage.

== Taxonomy ==
The Thunnini tribe is a monophyletic clade comprising 15 species in five genera:

- family Scombridae
  - tribe Thunnini: tunas
    - genus Allothunnus: slender tunas
    - genus Auxis: frigate tunas
    - genus Euthynnus: little tunas
    - genus Katsuwonus: skipjack tunas
    - genus Thunnus: albacores and true tunas
      - subgenus Thunnus (Thunnus): bluefin group
      - subgenus Thunnus (Neothunnus): yellowfin group

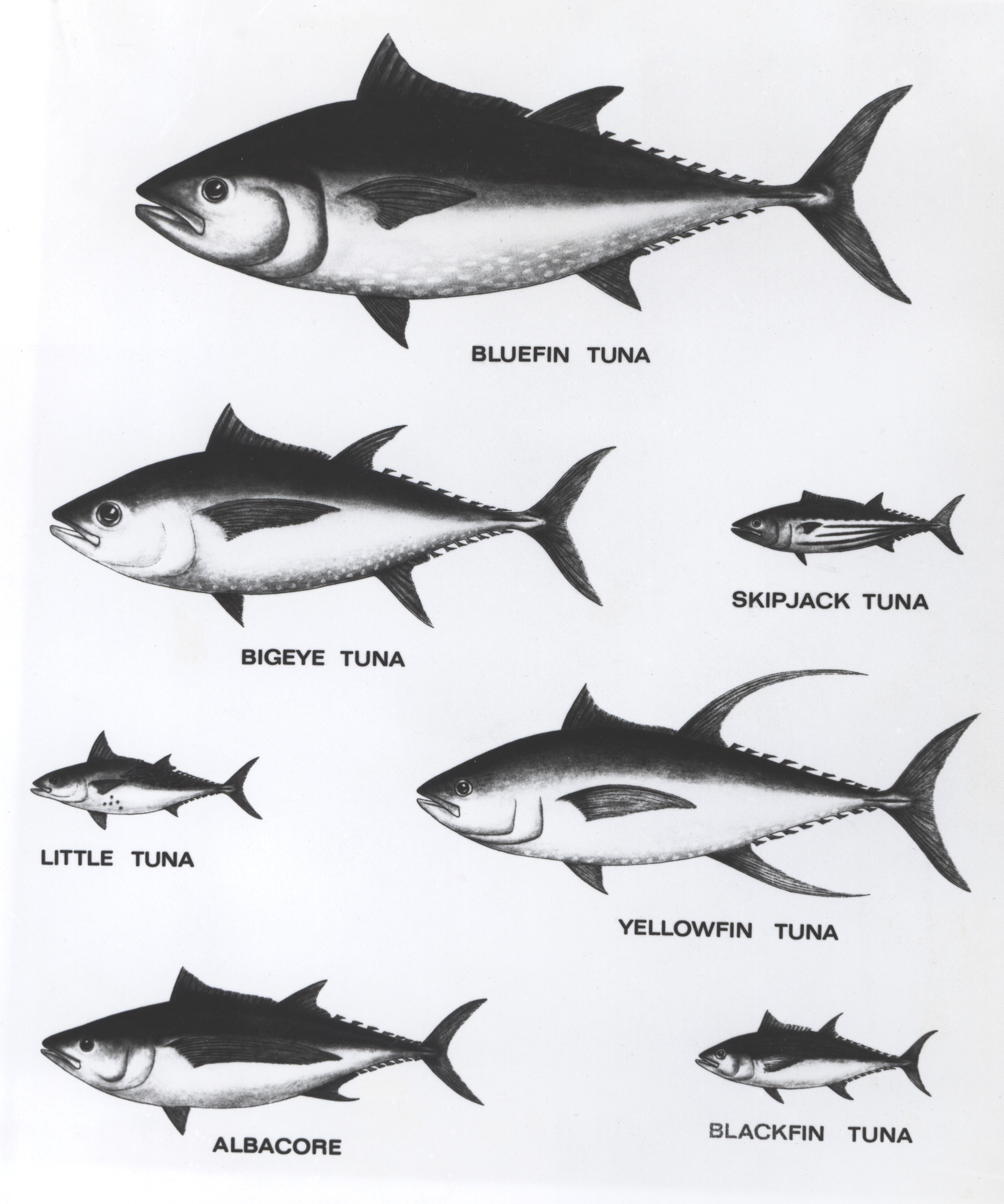
Relative sizes of various tunas, with the Atlantic bluefin tuna (top) at about 8 ft (2.4 m) in this sample

The following cladogram is based on a 2026 genetic analysis of Scombridae using Bayesian inference, and separates the tunas both through evolutionary and ecological developments:

- - Allothunnus fallai
  - Cybiosarda elegans
- Systematic endothermy
  - Warm water shallow divers
    - - Katsuwonus pelamis
      - - Auxis rochei
        - Auxis thazard
    - - Euthynnus alletteratus
      - - Euthynnus affinis
        - Euthynnus lineatus
  - Body size increase Cold water deep divers
    - Thunnus alalunga
    - - - Thunnus orientalis
        - Thunnus thynnus
      - Warm water deep divers
        - Thunnus maccoyii
        - - - Thunnus albacares
            - Thunnus obesus
          - - Thunnus atlanticus
            - Thunnus tonggol

The following cladogram is based on a 2004 phylogenetic analysis, and illustrates the relationship between the tunas and other tribes of the family Scombridae. For example, it shows that the skipjack tunas are more closely related to the true tunas than are the slender tunas (the most primitive of the tunas), and that the next nearest relatives of the tunas are the bonitos of the tribe Sardini.

The Tunas: Thunnini tribe, within the Family Scombridae

- family Scombridae
  - subfamily
    - Gasterochismatinae
      - - Butterfly kingfishes (one genus)
  - subfamily
    - Scombrinae
      - - tribe Scombrini
          - Mackerels (two genera)
      - - - tribe Scomberomorini
            Spanish mackerels (three genera)
        - - - tribe Sardini
              - - Bonitos (four genera)
          - - tribeThunnini,
              - Tunas
                - Allothunnus, slender tunas
                - - Auxis, frigate tunas
                  - - Euthynnus, little tunas
                    - - Katsuwonus, skipjack tunas
                      - - Thunnus, true tunas
                          - subgenus Thunnus
                            bluefin group
                          - subgenus Neothunnus
                            yellowfin group

Cladogram: Tunas are classified into the tribe Thunnini (bottom-center in the above diagram) – one of four tribes in the family Scombridae.

=== True species ===
The "true" tunas are those that belong to the genus Thunnus. Until recently, it was thought that there were seven Thunnus species, and that Atlantic bluefin tuna and Pacific bluefin tuna were subspecies of a single species. In 1999, B.B. Collette established that based on both molecular and morphological considerations, they are in fact distinct species.

The genus Thunnus is further divided into two subgenera: Thunnus (Thunnus) (the bluefin group), and Thunnus (Neothunnus) (the yellowfin group).

Thunnus, the true tunas
Image	Common name	Scientific name	Maximum length	Common length	Maximum weight	Maximum age	Trophic level	Source	IUCN status
Thunnus (Thunnus) – the bluefin group
	Albacore tuna	T. alalunga (Bonnaterre, 1788)	1.4 m (4.6 ft)	1.0 m (3.3 ft)	60.3 kg (133 lb)	9–13 yrs	4.31		Least Concern
	Southern bluefin tuna	T. maccoyii (Castelnau, 1872)	2.45 m (8.0 ft)	1.6 m (5.2 ft)	260 kg (570 lb)	20–40 yrs	3.93		Endangered
	Bigeye tuna	T. obesus (Lowe, 1839)	2.5 m (8.2 ft)	1.8 m (5.9 ft)	210 kg (460 lb)	5–16 yrs	4.49		Vulnerable
	Pacific bluefin tuna	T. orientalis (Temminck & Schlegel, 1844)	3.0 m (9.8 ft)	2.0 m (6.6 ft)	450 kg (990 lb)	15–26 yrs	4.21		Near Threatened
	Atlantic bluefin tuna	T. thynnus (Linnaeus, 1758)	4.6 m (15 ft)	2.0 m (6.6 ft)	684 kg (1,508 lb)	35–40 yrs	4.43		Least Concern
Thunnus (Neothunnus) – the yellowfin group
	Blackfin tuna	T. atlanticus (Lesson, 1831)	1.1 m (3.6 ft)	0.7 m (2.3 ft)	22.4 kg (49 lb)		4.13		Least concern
	Longtail tuna, northern bluefin tuna, tongol tuna	T. tonggol (Bleeker, 1851)	1.45 m (4.8 ft)	0.7 m (2.3 ft)	35.9 kg (79 lb)	18 years	4.50		Data deficient
	Yellowfin tuna	T. albacares (Bonnaterre, 1788)	2.4 m (7.9 ft)	1.5 m (4.9 ft)	200 kg (440 lb)	5–9 yrs	4.34		Least Concern

=== Other species ===
The Thunnini tribe also includes seven additional species of tuna across four genera. They are:

Other tuna species
Common name	Scientific name	Maximum length	Common length	Maximum weight	Maximum age	Trophic level	Source	IUCN status
Slender tuna	Allothunnus fallai (Serventy, 1948)	1.05 m (3.4 ft)	0.86 m (2.8 ft)	13.7 kg (30 lb)		3.74		Least concern
Bullet tuna	Auxis rochei (Risso, 1810)	0.5 m (1.6 ft)	0.35 m (1.1 ft)	1.8 kg (4.0 lb)	5 years	4.13		Least concern
Frigate tuna	Auxis thazard (Lacépède, 1800)	0.65 m (2.1 ft)	0.35 m (1.1 ft)	1.7 kg (3.7 lb)	5 years	4.34		Least concern
Mackerel tuna, Kawakawa	Euthynnus affinis (Cantor, 1849)	1.0 m (3.3 ft)	0.6 m (2.0 ft)	13.6 kg (30 lb)	6 years	4.50		Least concern
Little tunny	Euthynnus alletteratus (Rafinesque, 1810)	1.2 m (3.9 ft)	0.8 m (2.6 ft)	16.5 kg (36 lb)	10 years	4.13		Least concern
Black skipjack tuna	Euthynnus lineatus (Kishinouye, 1920)	0.84 m (2.8 ft)	0.6 m (2.0 ft)	11.8 kg (26 lb)		3.83		Least concern
Skipjack tuna	Katsuwonus pelamis (Linnaeus, 1758)	1.1 m (3.6 ft)	0.8 m (2.6 ft)	34.5 kg (76 lb)	6–12 yrs	3.75		Least concern

== Fishing ==
Maximum reported sizes of tuna species

=== Commerce ===
Tuna is an important commercial fish. The International Seafood Sustainability Foundation (ISSF) compiled a detailed scientific report on the state of global tuna stocks in 2009. According to the ISSF, the most important species for commercial and recreational tuna fisheries are yellowfin (Thunnus albacares), bigeye (T. obesus), bluefin (T. thynnus, T. orientalis, and T. macoyii), albacore (T. alalunga), and skipjack (Katsuwonus pelamis).

Based on catches from 2007, the report states:

Between 1940 and the mid-1960s, the annual world catch of the five principal market species of tunas rose from about 300 thousand tons to about 1 million tons, most of it taken by hook and line. With the development of purse-seine nets, now the predominant gear, catches have risen to more than 4 million tons annually during the last few years. Of these catches, about 68 percent are from the Pacific Ocean, 22 percent from the Indian Ocean, and the remaining 10 percent from the Atlantic Ocean and the Mediterranean Sea. Skipjack makes up about 60 percent of the catch, followed by yellowfin (24 percent), bigeye (10 percent), albacore (5 percent), and bluefin the remainder. Purse-seines take about 62 percent of the world production, longline about 14 percent, pole and line about 11 percent, and a variety of other gears the remainder.

The Australian government alleged in 2006 that Japan had illegally overfished southern bluefin by taking 12,000 to 20,000 tonnes per year instead of the agreed-upon 6,000 tonnes; the value of such overfishing would be as much as US$2 billion. Such overfishing has severely damaged bluefin stocks. According to the WWF, "Japan's huge appetite for tuna will take the most sought-after stocks to the brink of commercial extinction unless fisheries agree on more rigid quotas". Japan's Fisheries Research Agency counters that Australian and New Zealand tuna fishing companies under-report their total catches of southern bluefin tuna and ignore internationally mandated total allowable catch totals.

In recent years, opening day fish auctions at Tokyo's Tsukiji fish market and Toyosu Market have seen record-setting prices for bluefin tuna, reflecting market demand. In each of 2010, 2011, 2012, 2013 and 2019, new record prices have been set for a single fish – the current record is 333.6 million japanese yen (US$3.1 million) for a 278 kg (613 lb) bluefin, or a unit price of JP¥ 1,200,000/kg (US$5,057/lb). The opening auction price for 2014 plummeted to less than 5% of the previous year's price, which had drawn complaints for climbing "way out of line". A summary of record-setting auctions are shown in the following table (highlighted values indicate new world records):

Record bluefin tuna auctions at Tokyo's Tsukiji fish market and Toyosu Market
(Highlighted field indicates new record price for a single fish)
Year	Total weight	Total sale		Unit price		Source
Year	Total weight	(JP ¥)	(US $)	(¥ / kg)	($ / lb)	Source
2001	202 kg (445 lb)	¥20.2 million	$173,600	¥100,000 / kg	$386 / lb	
2010	232 kg (511 lb)	¥16.28 million	$175,000	¥70,172 / kg	$343 / lb	
2011	342 kg (754 lb)	¥32.49 million	$396,000	¥95,000 / kg	$528 / lb	
2012	269 kg (593 lb)	¥56.49 million	$736,000	¥210,000 / kg	$1,247 / lb	
2013	221 kg (487 lb)	¥155.4 million	$1.76 million	¥703,167 / kg	$3,603 / lb	
2019	278 kg (613 lb)	¥333.6 million	$3.1 million	¥1,200,000 / kg	$5,057 / lb	

In November 2011, a different record was set when a fisherman in Massachusetts caught an 881 lb (400 kg) tuna. It was captured inadvertently using a dragnet. Due to the laws and restrictions on tuna fishing in the United States, federal authorities impounded the fish because it was not caught with a rod and reel. Because of the tuna's deteriorated condition as a result of the trawl net, the fish sold for just under $5,000.

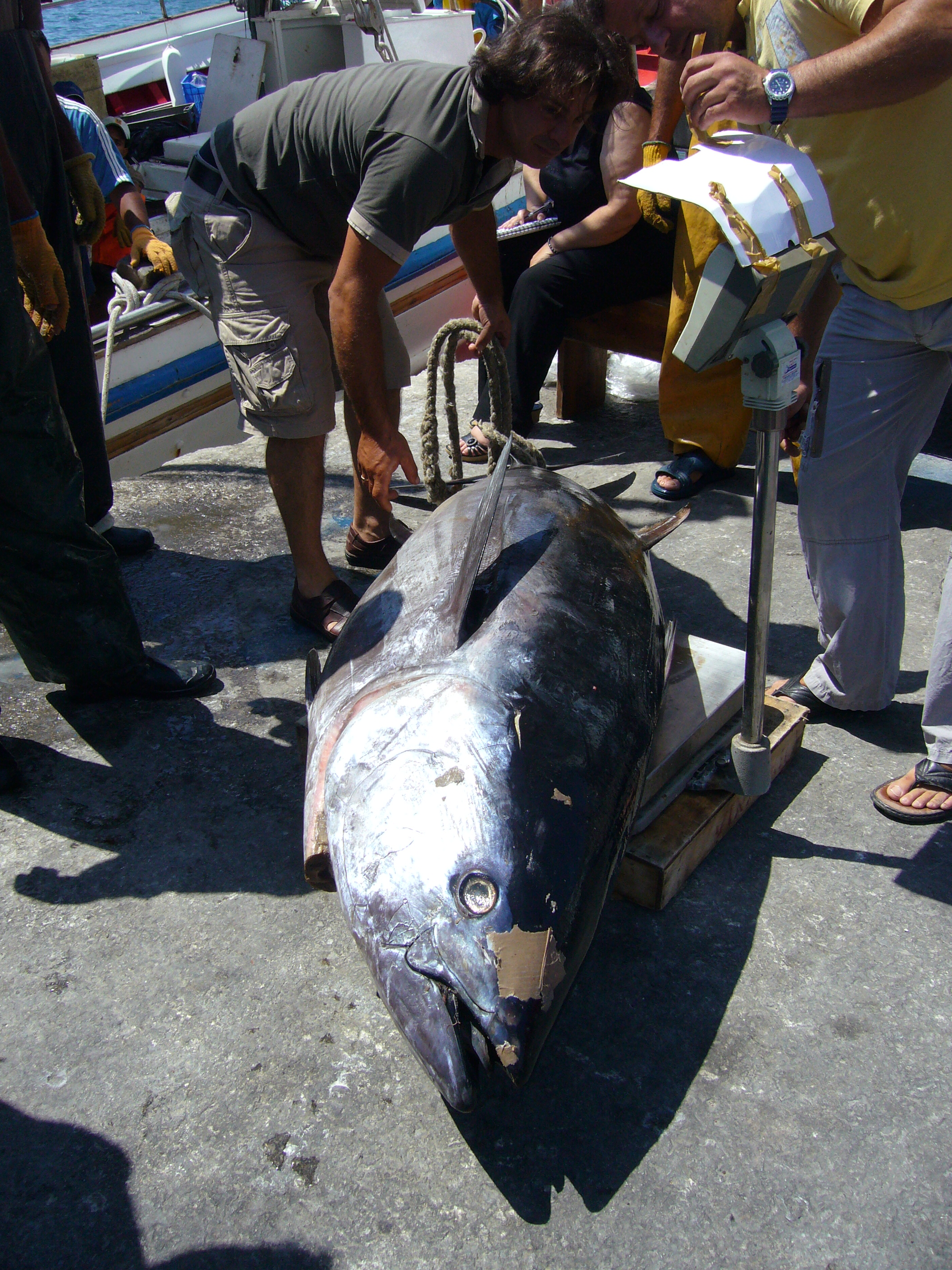
Tuna being weighed on Greek quay-side

Tuna at Tsukiji fish market, Tokyo

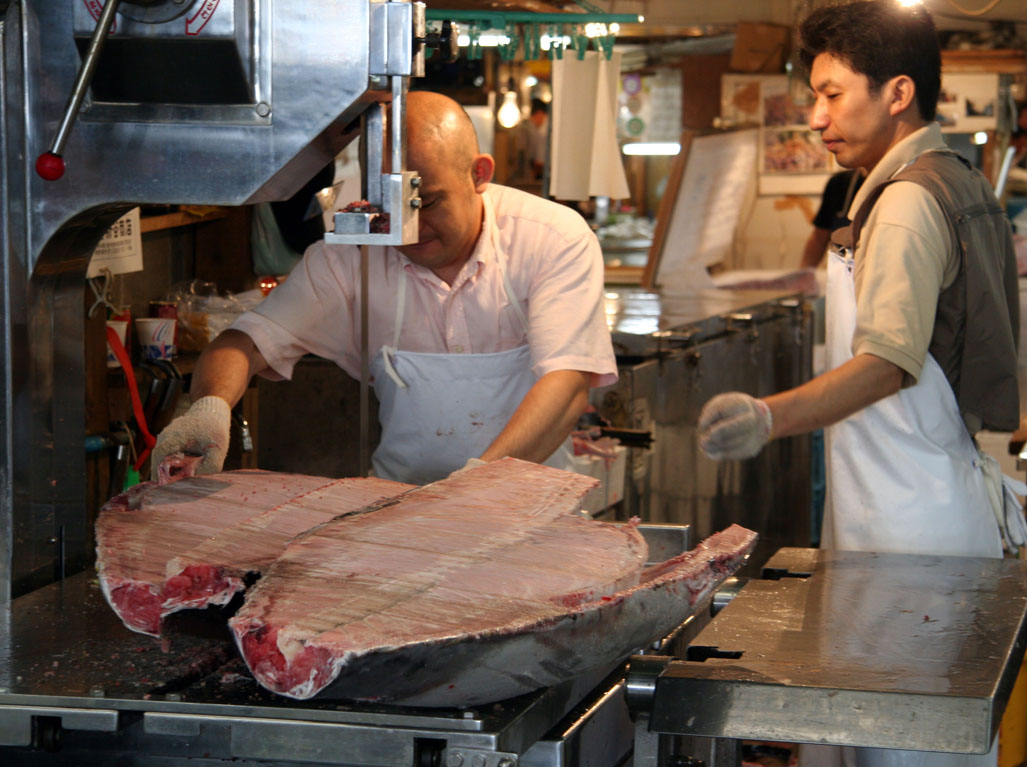
Tuna cut in half for processing at Tsukuji fish market

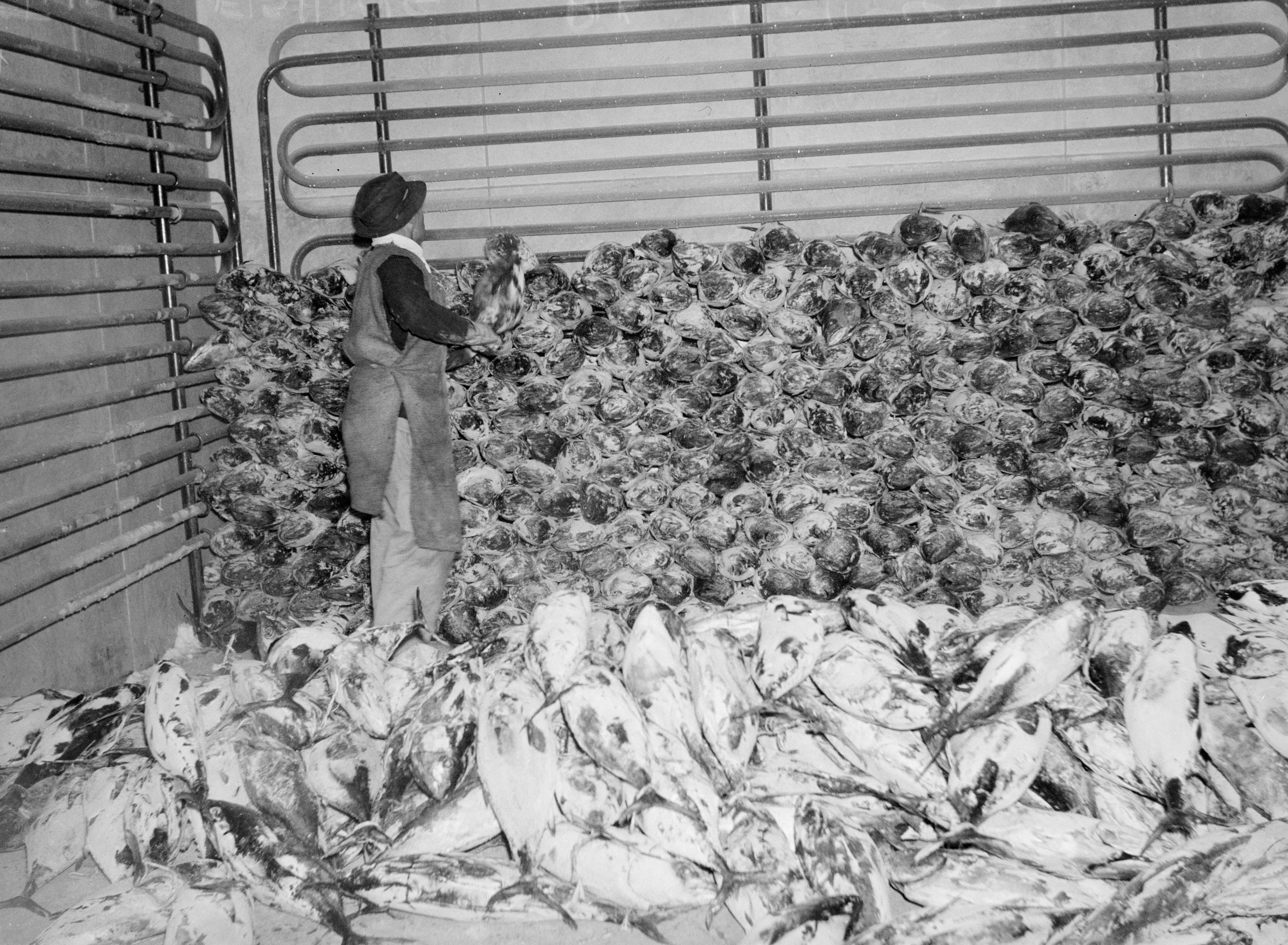
Tuna fish in cold storage, New South Wales, 1949

Two men with the large tuna, California, 1902

=== Methods ===
External videos
- Tuna pole and line fishing BBC Two

Besides for eating, many tuna species are caught frequently as game, often for recreation or for contests in which money is awarded based on weight. Larger specimens are notorious for putting up a fight while hooked, and have been known to injure people who try to catch them, as well as damage their equipment.

- Phoenician technique for trapping and catching Atlantic bluefin tuna called Almadraba, still used today in Portugal, Spain, Morocco and Italy which uses a maze of nets. In Sicily, the same method is called Tonnara.
- Fish farming (cage system)
- Tuna ranching
- Longline fishing
- Purse seines
- Pole and line
- Harpoon gun
- Big game fishing
- Fish aggregating device

=== Association with whaling ===
In 2005, Nauru, defending its vote from Australian criticism at that year's meeting of the International Whaling Commission, argued that some whale species have the potential to devastate Nauru's tuna stocks, and that Nauru's food security and economy relies heavily on fishing. Despite this, Nauru does not permit whaling in its own waters and does not allow other fishing vessels to take or intentionally interact with marine mammals in its Exclusive Economic Zone. In 2010 and 2011, Nauru supported Australian proposals for a western Pacific-wide ban on tuna purse-seining in the vicinity of marine mammals – a measure which was agreed by the Western and Central Pacific Fisheries Commission at its eighth meeting in March 2012.

=== Association with dolphins ===
Dolphins swim beside several tuna species. These include yellowfin tuna in the eastern Pacific Ocean, but not albacore. Tuna schools are believed to associate themselves with dolphins for protection against sharks, which are tuna predators.

Commercial fishing vessels used to exploit this association by searching for dolphin pods. Vessels would encircle the pod with nets to catch the tuna beneath. The nets were prone to entangling dolphins, injuring or killing them. Public outcry and new government regulations, which are now monitored by NOAA have led to more dolphin-friendly methods, now generally involving lines rather than nets. There are neither universal independent inspection programs nor verification of dolphin safety, so these protections are not absolute. According to Consumers Union, the resulting lack of accountability means claims of tuna that is "dolphin safe" should be given little credence.

Fishery practices have changed to be dolphin friendly, which has caused greater bycatch including sharks, turtles and other oceanic fish. Fishermen no longer follow dolphins, but concentrate their fisheries around floating objects such as fish aggregation devices, also known as FADs, which attract large populations of other organisms. Measures taken thus far to satisfy the public demand to protect dolphins can be potentially damaging to other species as well.

=== Aquaculture ===
Increasing quantities of high-grade tuna caught at sea are reared in net pens and fed bait fish. In Australia, former fishermen raise southern bluefin tuna (Thunnus maccoyii) and another bluefin species. Farming its close relative, the Atlantic bluefin tuna, Thunnus thynnus, is beginning in the Mediterranean, North America and Japan. Hawaiʻi approved permits for the first U.S. offshore farming of bigeye tuna in water 1,300 feet (400 m) deep in 2009.

Japan is the biggest tuna-consuming nation and is also the leader in tuna farming research. Japan first successfully farm-hatched and raised bluefin tuna in 1979. In 2002, it succeeded in completing the reproduction cycle and in 2007, completed a third generation. The farm breed is known as Kindai tuna, short for Kinki daigaku (Kindai University). In 2009, Clean Seas, an Australian company which has been receiving assistance from Kindai University managed to breed southern bluefin tuna in captivity and was awarded the second place in World's Best Invention of 2009 by Time magazine.

== Food ==
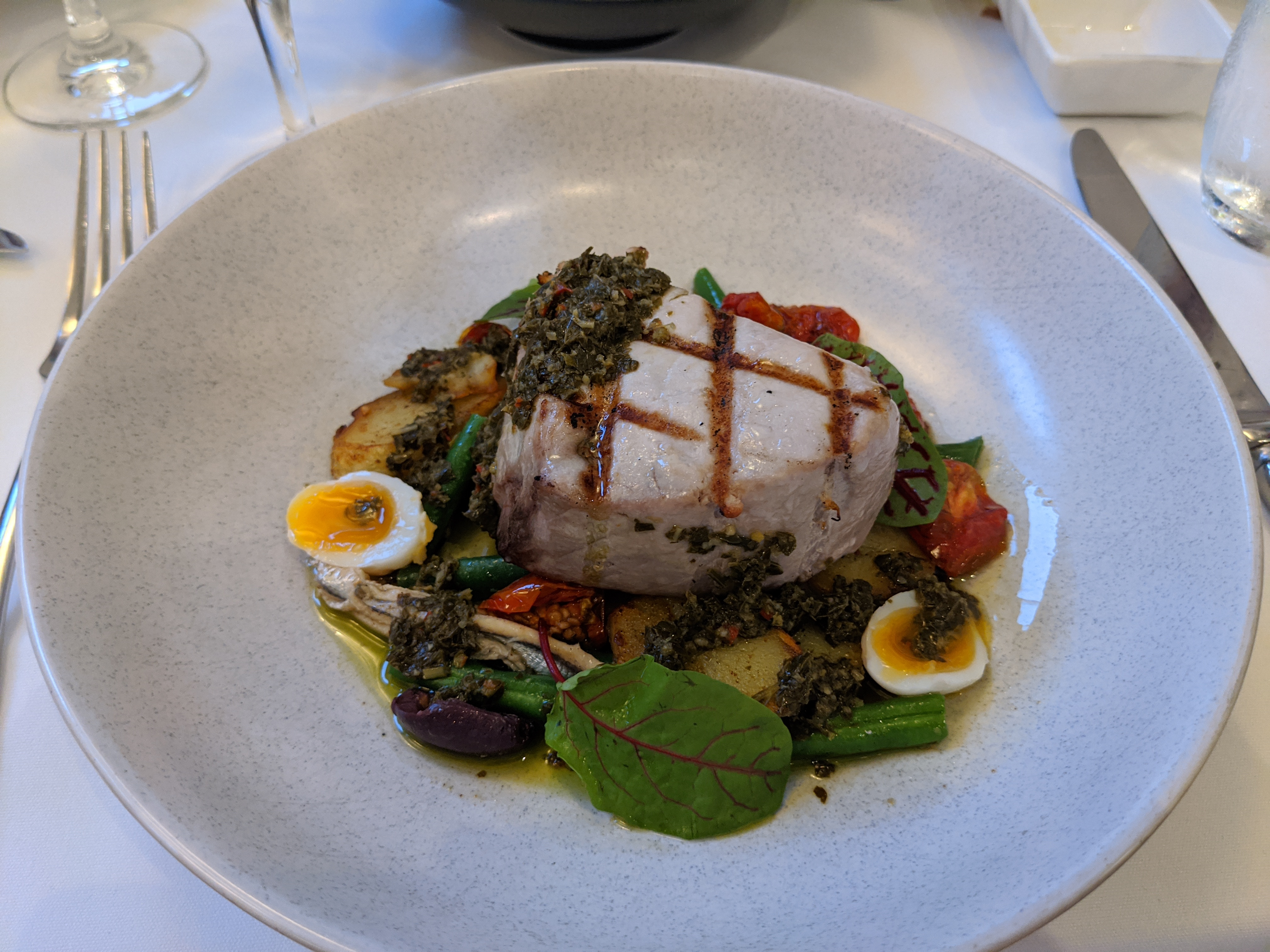
A grilled tuna steak

=== Fresh and frozen ===
The fresh or frozen flesh of tuna is widely regarded as a delicacy in most areas where it is shipped, being prepared in a variety of ways. When served as a steak, the meat of most species is known for its thickness and firm texture. In the U.K., supermarkets began flying in fresh tuna steaks in the late 1990s, which helped to increase the popularity of using fresh tuna in cooking; by 2009, celebrity chefs regularly featured fresh tuna in salads, wraps, and char-grilled dishes.

==== Served raw ====
Various species of tuna are often served raw in Japanese cuisine as sushi or sashimi.

Commercial sashimi tuna may have their coloration fixated by pumping carbon monoxide (CO) into bags containing the tuna, and holding it at 4 °C. For a 2-inch tuna steak, this requires 24 hours. The fish is then vacuum sealed and frozen. In Japan, color fixation using CO is prohibited.

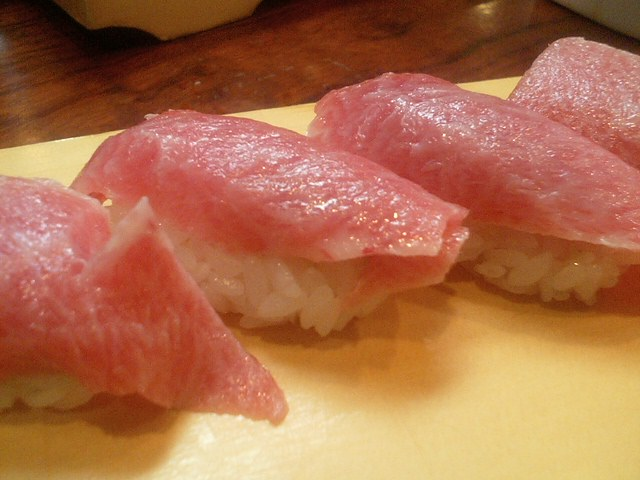
Sushi

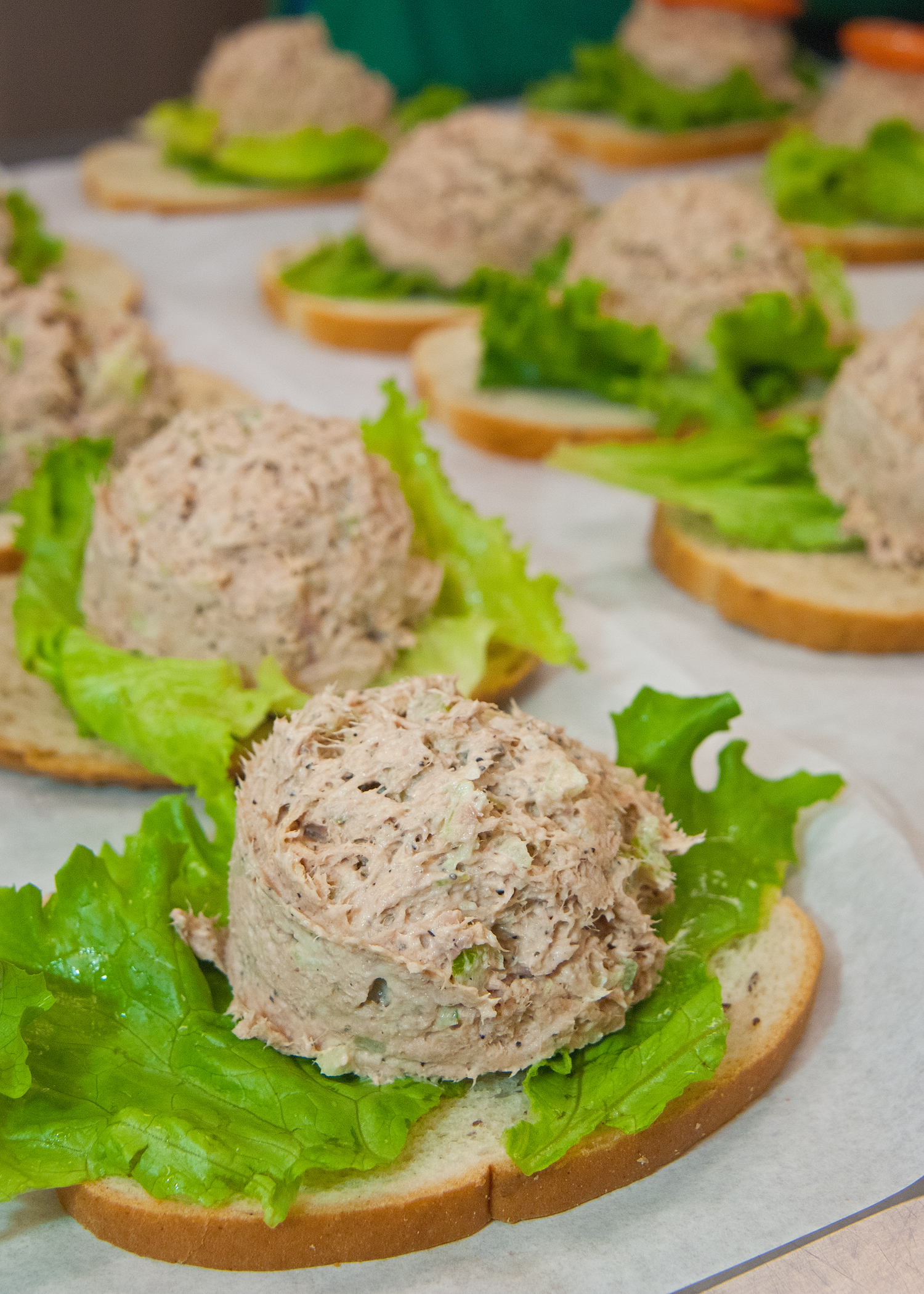
Tuna salad

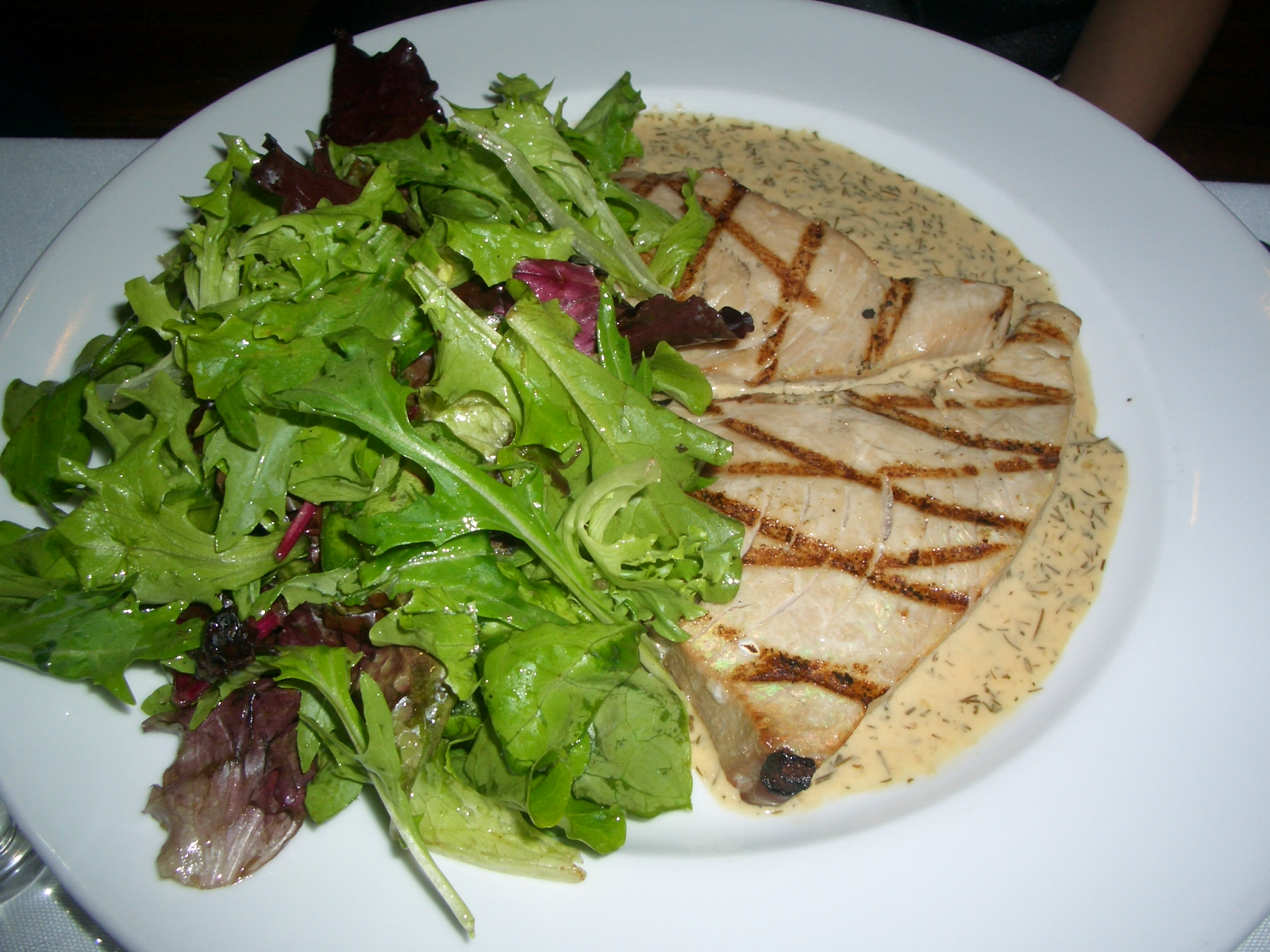
Tuna steak served in a French bistro

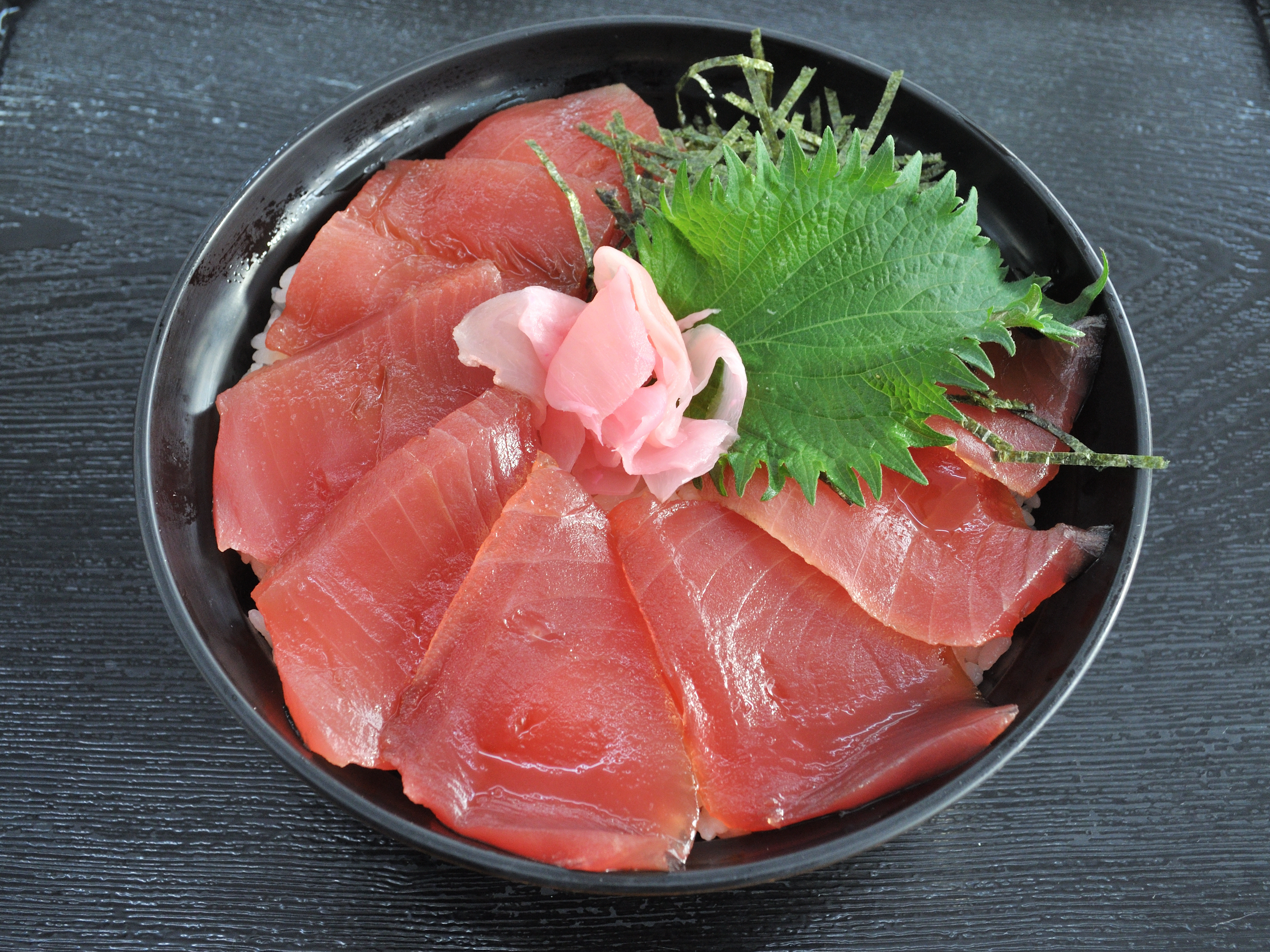
Tekkadon

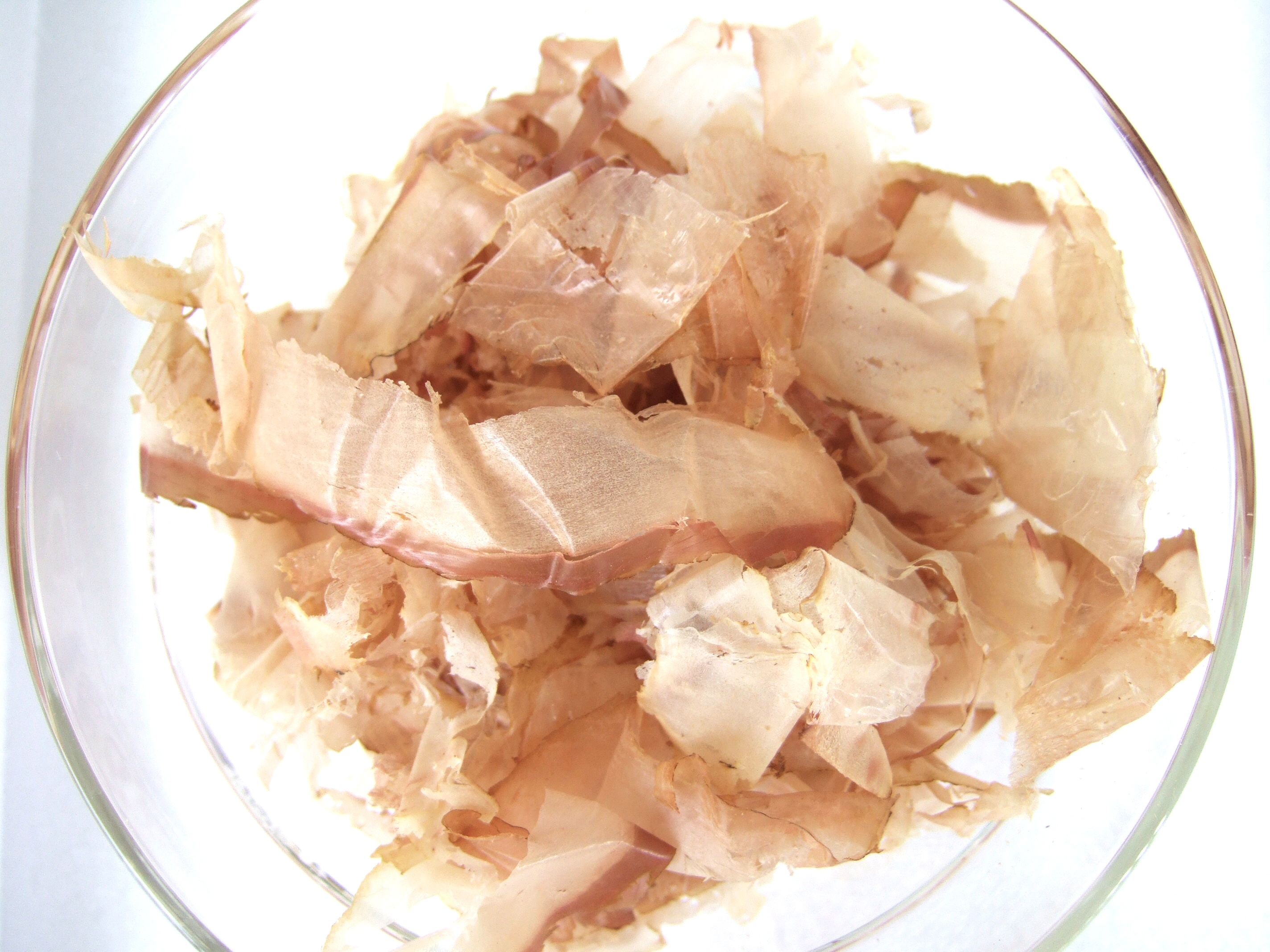
Katsuobushi shavings

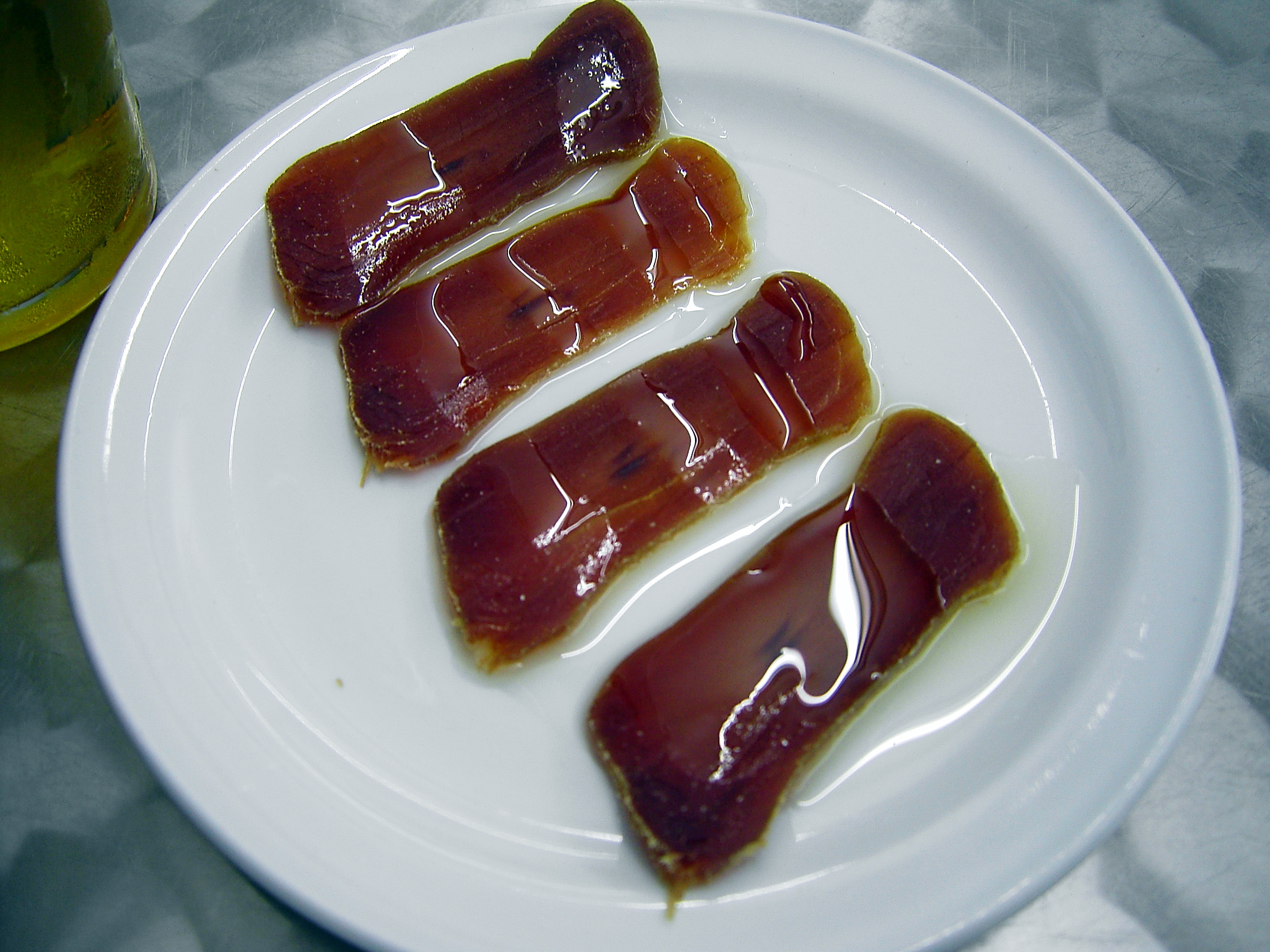
Mojama

=== Canned ===
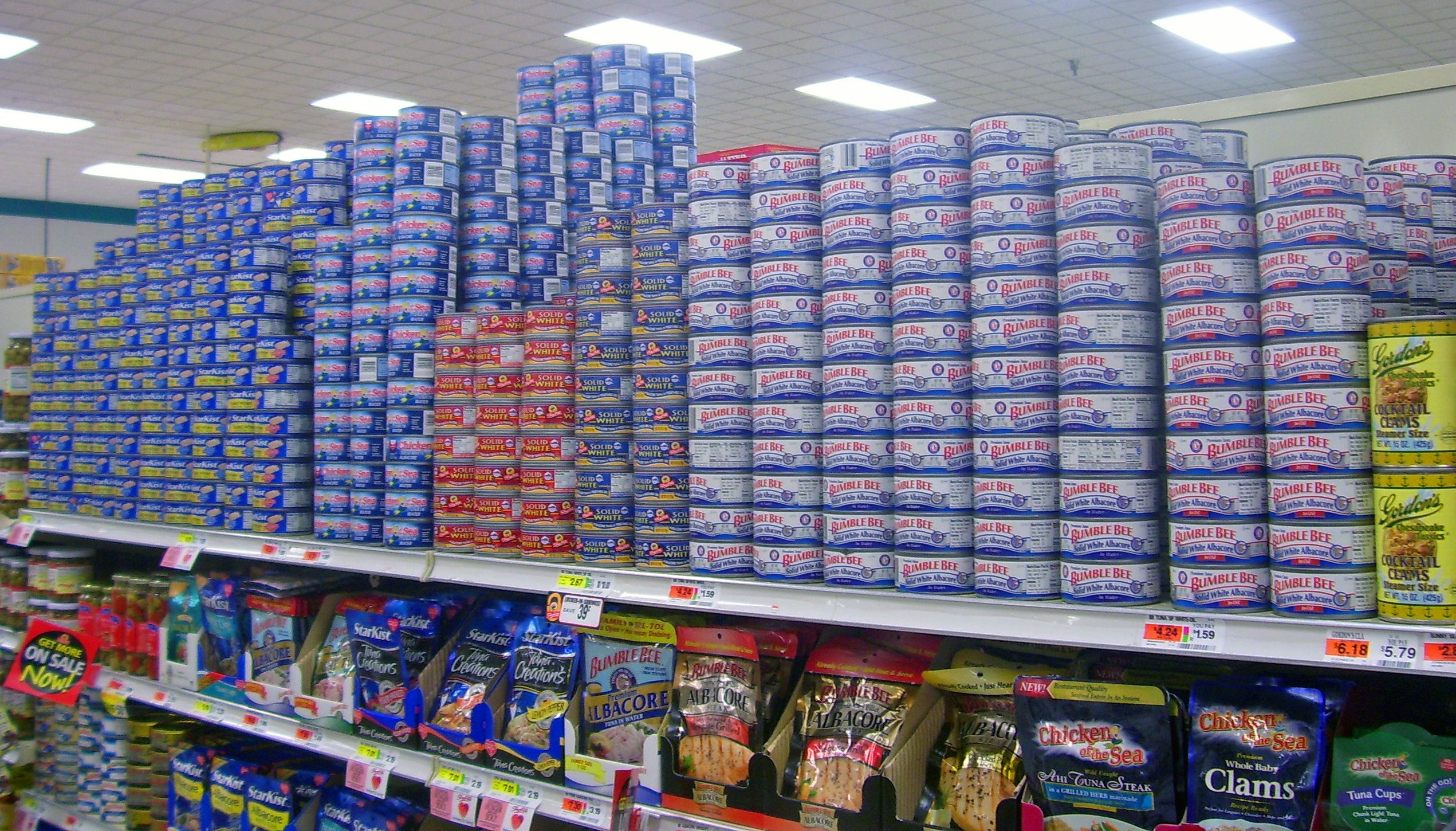
Canned tuna on sale at a supermarket

Tuna is canned in edible oils, in brine, in water, and in various sauces. Tuna may be processed and labeled as "solid", "chunked" ("chunk") or "flaked". When tuna is canned and packaged for sale, the product is sometimes called tuna fish (U.S.), a calque (loan translation) from the German Thunfisch. Canned tuna is sometimes used as food for pets, especially cats.

Australia

Canned tuna was first produced in Australia in 1903 and quickly became popular.

In the early 1980s canned tuna in Australia was most likely southern bluefin, as of 2003 it was usually yellowfin, skipjack, or tongol (labelled "northern bluefin" or "longtail").

Australian standards once required cans of tuna to contain at least 51% tuna, but those regulations were dropped in 2003. The remaining weight is usually oil or water.

United States

The product became more plentiful in the United States in the late 1940s. In 1950, 8,500,000 pounds of canned tuna were produced, and the U.S. Department of Agriculture classified it as a "plentiful food".

In the United States, 52% of canned tuna is used for sandwiches; 22% for tuna salads; and 15% for tuna casseroles and dried, prepackaged meal kits, such as General Mills's Tuna Helper line. Other canned tuna dishes include tuna melts (a type of sandwich where the tuna is mixed with mayonnaise and served on bread with cheese melted on top); salade niçoise (a salad made of tuna, olives, green beans, potatoes, hard-boiled eggs and anchovy dressing); and tuna burgers (served on buns).

In the United States, the Food and Drug Administration (FDA) regulates canned tuna (see part c).

Precooked

As tunas are often caught far from where they are processed, poor interim conservation can lead to spoilage. Tuna is typically gutted by hand, and later precooked for prescribed times of 45 minutes to three hours. The fish are then cleaned and filleted, canned (and sealed), with the dark lateral blood meat often separately canned for pet food (cat or dog). The sealed can is then heated under pressure (called "retort cooking") for 2–4 hours. This process kills any bacteria, but retains the histamine that may have been produced by those bacteria, and so may still taste spoiled. The international standard sets the maximum histamine level at 200 milligrams per kilogram. An Australian study of 53 varieties of unflavored canned tuna found none to exceed the safe histamine level, although some had "off" flavors.

Light and white

In some markets, depending upon the color of the flesh of the tuna species, the can is marked as "light" or "white" meat, with "light" meaning a greyish pink color and "white" meaning a light pink color. In the United States, only albacore can legally be sold in canned form as "white meat tuna"; in other countries, yellowfin is also acceptable.

Ventresca tuna

Ventresca tuna (from ventre, the Italian word for belly), is a luxury canned tuna, from the fatty bluefin tuna belly, also used in sushi as toro.

=== Nutrition ===
Tuna, light, canned in oil, drained solids
Nutritional value per 100 g (3.5 oz)
- Energy: 830 kJ (200 kcal)
- Carbohydrates: 0 g
- Fat: 8 g
- Protein: 29 g
Vitamins and minerals
Vitamins	Quantity %DV^{†}
Vitamin A equiv.	3% 23 μg
Choline	5% 29 mg
Vitamin D	34% 269 IU
Minerals	Quantity %DV^{†}
Calcium	1% 13 mg
Iron	8% 1.4 mg
Magnesium	7% 31 mg
Phosphorus	25% 311 mg
Potassium	7% 207 mg
Zinc	8% 0.9 mg
- Other constituents: Quantity
- Water: 60 g
- Link to USDA FoodData Central entry
- ^{†}Percentages estimated using US recommendations for adults, except for potassium, which is estimated based on expert recommendation from the National Academies.

Canned light tuna in oil is 29% protein, 8% fat, 60% water, and contains no carbohydrates, while providing 200 calories in a 100 gram reference amount (table). It is a rich source (20% or more of the Daily Value, DV) of vitamin D and phosphorus (table).

=== Mercury and health ===
Mercury content in tuna can vary widely. Among those calling for improved warnings about mercury in tuna is the American Medical Association, which adopted a policy that physicians should help make their patients more aware of the potential risks. A study published in 2008 found that mercury distribution in the meat of farmed tuna is inversely related to the lipid content, suggesting that higher lipid concentration within edible tissues of tuna raised in captivity might, other factors remaining equal, have a diluting effect on mercury content. Mackerel tuna is one species of tuna that is lower in mercury concentration than skipjack or yellowfin, but this species is known as "black meat" or "dark meat" tuna, which is a lower grade for canning because of the color, unfavorable flavor, and poor yield.

In March 2004, the United States FDA issued guidelines recommending that pregnant women, nursing mothers, and children limit their intake of tuna and other predatory fish. The Environmental Protection Agency provides guidelines on how much canned tuna is safe to eat. Roughly speaking, the guidelines recommend one 6-ounce (170 g) can of light tuna per week for individuals weighing less than 110 pounds (50 kg), and two cans per week for those who weigh more. In 2007, it was reported that some canned light tuna such as yellowfin tuna is significantly higher in mercury than skipjack, and caused Consumers Union and other activist groups to advise pregnant women to refrain from consuming canned tuna. In 2009, a California appeals court upheld a ruling that canned tuna does not need warning labels as the methylmercury is naturally occurring.

A January 2008 report revealed potentially dangerous levels of mercury in certain varieties of sushi tuna, reporting levels "so high that the Food and Drug Administration could take legal action to remove the fish from the market."

== Management and conservation ==
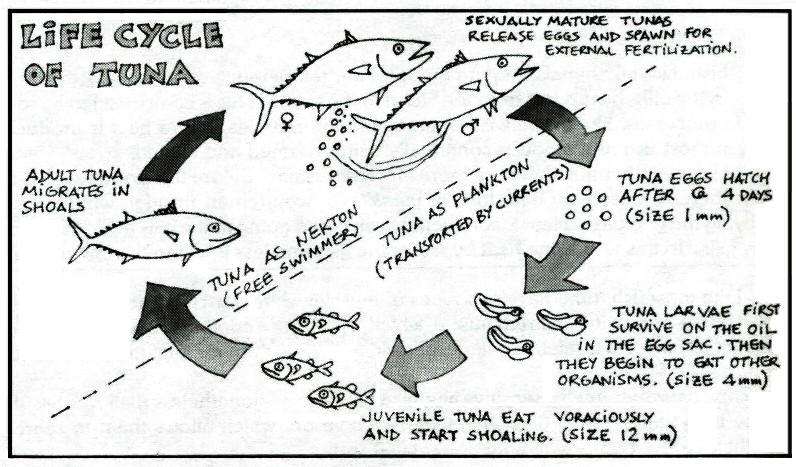
Life cycle

The main tuna fishery management bodies are the Western and Central Pacific Fisheries Commission, the Inter-American Tropical Tuna Commission, the Indian Ocean Tuna Commission, the International Commission for the Conservation of Atlantic Tunas, and the Commission for the Conservation of Southern Bluefin Tuna. The five gathered for the first time in Kobe, Japan in January 2007. Environmental organizations made submissions on risks to fisheries and species. The meeting concluded with an action plan drafted by some 60 countries or areas. Concrete steps include issuing certificates of origin to prevent illegal fishing and greater transparency in the setting of regional fishing quotas. The delegates were scheduled to meet at another joint meeting in January or February 2009 in Europe.

In 2010, Greenpeace International added the albacore, bigeye tuna, Pacific bluefin tuna, Atlantic bluefin tuna, southern bluefin tuna, and yellowfin tuna to its seafood red list, which are fish "commonly sold in supermarkets around the world, and which have a very high risk of being sourced from unsustainable fisheries."

Bluefin tuna have been widely accepted as being severely overfished, with some stocks at risk of collapse. According to the International Seafood Sustainability Foundation (a global, nonprofit partnership between the tuna industry, scientists, and the World Wide Fund for Nature), Indian Ocean yellowfin tuna, Pacific Ocean (eastern and western) bigeye tuna, and North Atlantic albacore tuna are all overfished. In April 2009, no stock of skipjack tuna (which makes up roughly 60% of all tuna fished worldwide) was considered to be overfished.

The BBC documentary South Pacific, which first aired in May 2009, stated that, should fishing in the Pacific continue at its current rate, populations of all tuna species could collapse within five years. It highlighted huge Japanese and European tuna fishing vessels, sent to the South Pacific international waters after overfishing their own fish stocks to the point of collapse.

A 2010 tuna fishery assessment report, released in January 2012 by the Secretariat of the Pacific Community, supported this finding, recommending that all tuna fishing should be reduced or limited to current levels and that limits on skipjack fishing be considered.

Research indicates that increasing ocean temperatures are taking a toll on the tuna in the Indian Ocean, where rapid warming of the ocean has resulted in a reduction of marine phytoplankton. The bigeye tuna catch rates have also declined abruptly during the past half century, mostly due to increased industrial fisheries, with the ocean warming adding further stress to the fish species.

== See also ==
- Environmental impact of fishing
- Got Mercury?
- List of tuna dishes
- Natal homing

== Further references ==
- Clover, Charles. 2004. The End of the Line: How Overfishing Is Changing the World and What We Eat. Ebury Press, London. ISBN 0-09-189780-7
- FAO: Species Catalog Vol. 2 Scombrids of the World. FAO Fisheries Synopsis No. 125, Volume 2. FIR/S125 Vol. 2.ISBN 92-5-101381-0
- FAO: Review of the state of world marine fishery resources: Tuna and tuna-like species – Global, 2005 Rome.
- Majkowski, Jacek (1995) "Tuna and tuna-like species" In: Review of the state of world marine fishery resources, FAO Fisheries technical paper 457, FAO, Rome. ISBN 978-92-5-107023-9.
- Majkowski J, Arrizabalaga H, Carocci F and Murua H (2011) "Tuna and tuna-like species" In: Review of the state of world marine fishery resources, pages 227–244, FAO Fisheries technical paper 569, FAO, Rome. ISBN 978-92-5-107023-9.
- Standard of Identity for Canned Tuna (United States), Code of Federal Regulations: 21 CFR 161.190 – Canned tuna.
- Viñas J and Tudela S (2009) "A validated methodology for genetic identification of tuna species (genus Thunnus)" PLoS One, 4(10): e7606.
