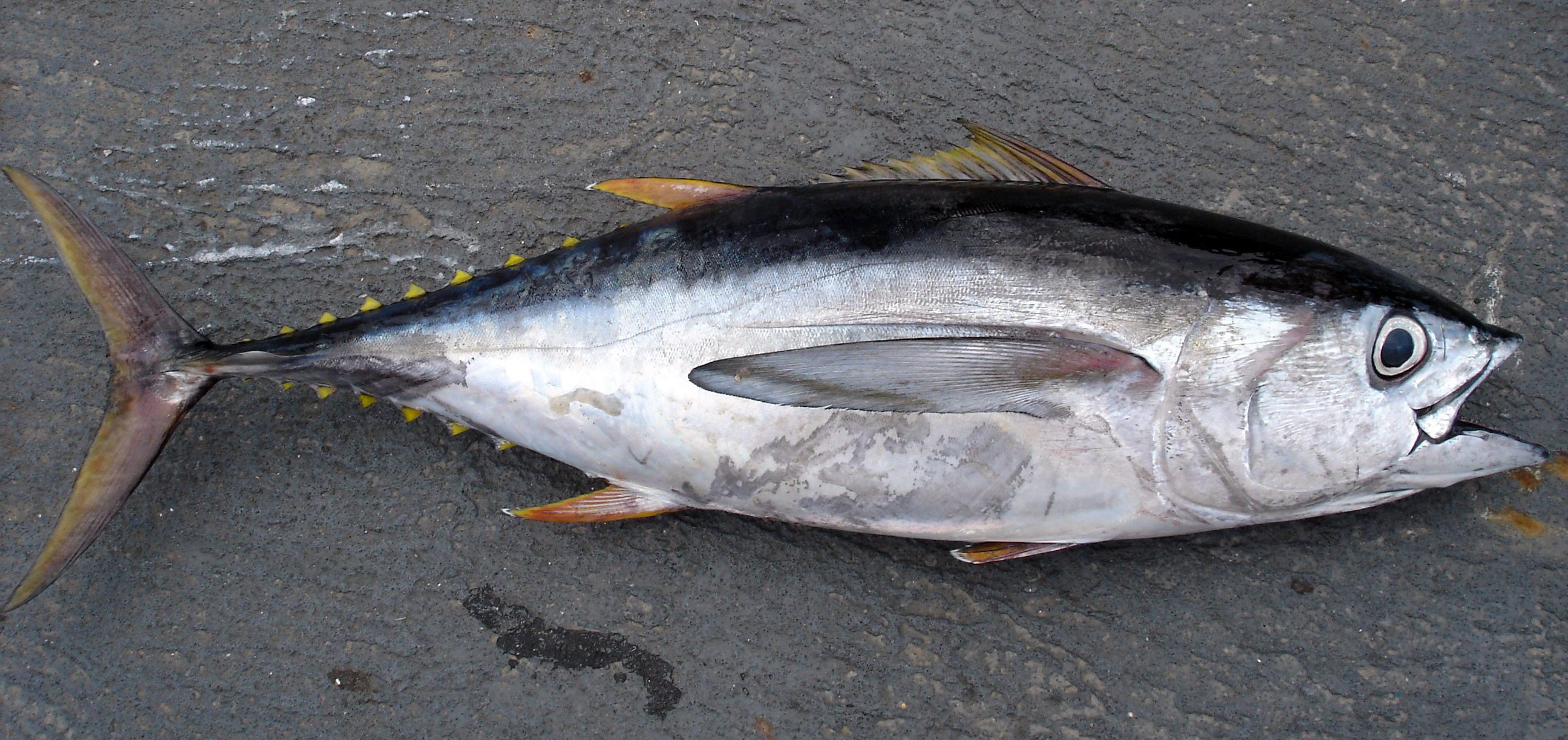

Conservation status
- Vulnerable (IUCN 3.1)

Scientific classification
- Kingdom: Animalia
- Phylum: Chordata
- Class: Actinopterygii
- Division: Teleostei
- Order: Scombriformes
- Family: Scombridae
- Genus: Thunnus
- Subgenus: Thunnus
- Species: T. obesus

Binomial name
- Thunnus obesus (Lowe, 1839)

Synonyms
- Thunnus obesus (Lowe, 1839); Thynnus obesus Lowe, 1839; Germogus obesus (Lowe, 1839); Neothunnus obesus (Lowe, 1839); Parathunnus obesus (Lowe, 1839); Thynnus sibi Temminck & Schlegel, 1844; Germo sibi (Temminck & Schlegel, 1844); Orcynus sibi (Temminck & Schlegel, 1844); Parathunnus sibi (Temminck & Schlegel, 1844); Thunnus sibi (Temminck & Schlegel, 1844); Thunnus mebachi Kishinouye, 1915; Parathunnus mebachi (Kishinouye, 1915)

= Bigeye tuna =

Species of fish

The bigeye tuna (Thunnus obesus) is a species of true tuna of the genus Thunnus, belonging to the wider mackerel family Scombridae. Bigeye tuna are found in the open waters of all tropical and temperate oceans, but not in the Mediterranean Sea.

== Description ==
Bigeye tuna can grow up to 2.5 m (98 in; 8.2 ft) in length. Maximum weight of individuals probably exceeds 180 kg (400 lb), with the all-tackle angling record standing at 178 kg (392 lb 7 oz). They are large, deep-bodied, streamlined fish with large heads and eyes. The pectoral fins are very long, reaching back beyond the start of the second dorsal fin in juveniles and the space between the first and second dorsal fin in adults. They have 13 or 14 dorsal spines.

== Physiology ==
Bigeye tuna have a unique physiology which allows them to forage in deeper colder waters and tolerate oxygen-poor waters. Bigeye tuna are reported to tolerate ambient oxygen levels of 1.0 mL/L and routinely reach depths where ambient oxygen content is below 1.5 mL/L, largely due to the presence of blood with a high oxygen affinity. Vascular counter-current heat exchangers maintain body temperatures above ambient water temperature. These heat exchangers are engaged to conserve heat in deeper colder waters and are disengaged to allow rapid warming as the tuna ascend from cold water into warmer surface waters, providing short-latency, physiological thermoregulation. The eyes of bigeye tuna are well developed and with a large spherical lens allowing their vision to function well in low light conditions.

== Life history ==
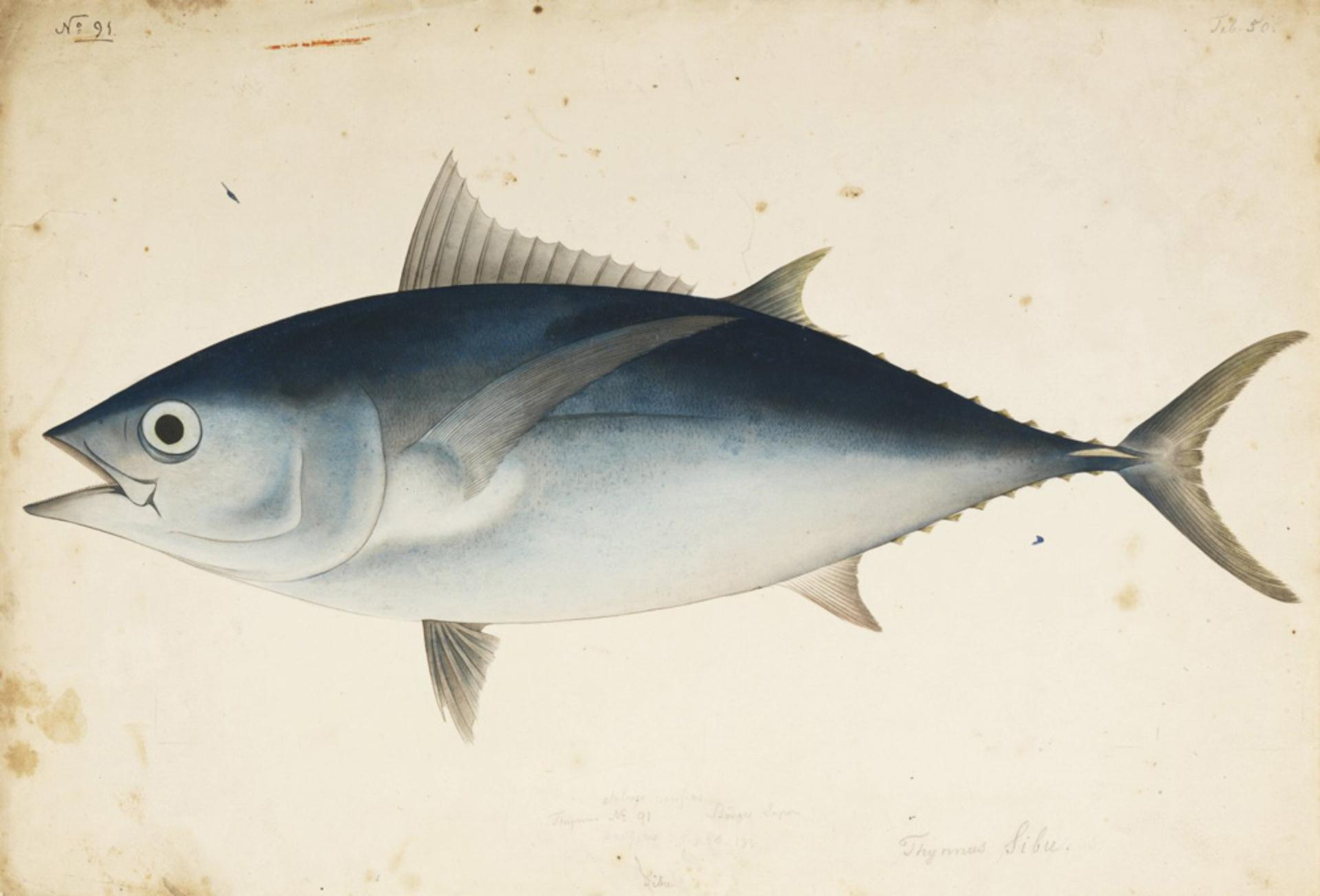
Drawing by Kawahara Keiga, 1829

Conventional tagging data and counts of growth increments in otoliths (ear bones) of bigeye tuna have recorded a maximum age of 16 years. Recorded lengths at which sexual maturity is attained varies geographically with a length at which 50% of fishes sampled are mature of 135 cm (53 in) in the eastern Pacific Ocean and 102–105 cm (40–41 in) in the western Pacific Ocean. This translates to an age of maturity of 2–4 years. Differences in methods of studies may contribute to this variability. Spawning takes place across most months of the year in tropical regions of the Pacific Ocean, becoming seasonal at higher latitudes when sea surface temperatures are above 24 °C (75 °F). In the northwestern tropical Atlantic spawning occurs in June and July, and in January and February in the Gulf of Guinea, which is the only known Atlantic nursery area.

== Behavior ==
=== Vertical movement ===
Bigeye tuna undertake a distinct diel shift in vertical behaviour, generally descending at dawn to deeper, cooler waters and returning to shallower, warmer waters at dusk. During the day they can undertake vertical movements into waters of 300–500 m (980–1,640 ft) depth that can be as much as 20 °C (68 °F) cooler than surface waters. Individuals undertake thermoregulatory behaviour whilst at depth, periodically returning from deeper, cooler waters to shallower, warmer waters to re-warm. Across the Pacific Ocean the depths at which bigeye tuna spend the majority of their time during the day vary: in the eastern Pacific the majority of time is spent at 200–350 m (660–1,150 ft); around Hawaii the majority of time is spent at 300–400 m (980–1,310 ft) and in the Coral Sea the majority of time is spent at 300–500 m (980–1,640 ft). These suggest that bigeye tuna (or their prey) are tracking an optimum temperature (10–15 °C (50–59 °F)) which is shallower in the eastern Pacific Ocean than in the western Pacific Ocean. The diel shift in the vertical behaviour of bigeye tuna has been suggested to be associated with the diel migration of their prey. This is supported by the identification of a number of diurnally migrating species from the stomachs of bigeye tuna and observations of close associations between bigeye tuna and the sound scattering layer both during the day and at night.

Typical vertical behaviour of bigeye tuna shifts when fish associate with seamounts, buoys and fish aggregating devices, with individuals remaining in surface waters. Association with objects has been observed to occur over periods of approximately 10–30 days. This associative behaviour of bigeye tuna (and also other species of tuna) is taken advantage of by fisheries with approximately 27% of all catches of tunas by purse seine vessels in the western and central Pacific Ocean derived from fish aggregating devices.

=== Migration ===
Results from tagging studies show that bigeye tuna are capable of traversing ocean basins, but can also show a high degree of site fidelity to some regions. One study suggested an annual migration influenced by water temperature, specifically that near the surface. Central Pacific bigeye migrate from subtropical waters in September to tropical waters in March. The fish also briefly travel outside these thermal ranges. Other data indicate similar Pacific-wide variations.

=== Diet ===
Bigeye tuna primarily feed on epipelagic and mesopelagic fish, crustaceans and cephalopods.

== Commercial fishery ==
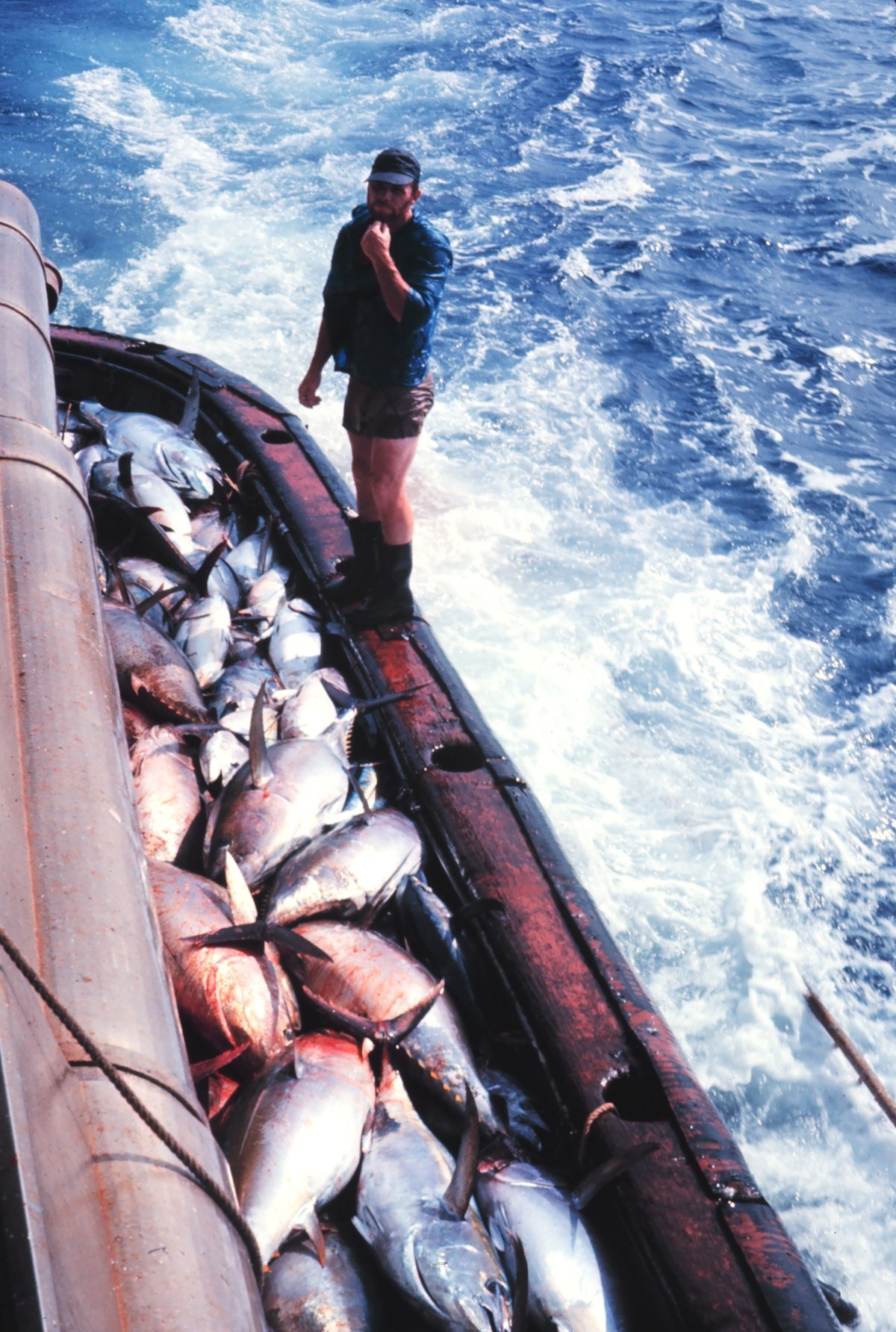
Bigeye tuna caught with three-pole one-line rig

Global capture production of Bigeye tuna (Thunnus obesus) in thousand tonnes from 1950 to 2022, as reported by the FAO

Globally, approximately 450,500 metric tonnes of bigeye tuna were caught by commercial vessels in 2012. Commercial fisheries for bigeye tuna are regionally managed within the Pacific Ocean by the Western and Central Pacific Fisheries Commission (WCPFC) and the Inter-American Tropical Tuna Commission (IATTC). In the Indian Ocean catches are managed by the Indian Ocean Tuna Commission (IOTC) and in the Atlantic Ocean by the International Commission for the Conservation of Atlantic Tunas (ICCAT). Regular stock assessments are carried out for bigeye tuna by each of the regional fisheries management organisations with bigeye tuna currently regarded as overfished in the western and central Pacific Ocean and eastern Pacific Ocean, close to or being overfished in the Atlantic Ocean and not overfished in the Indian Ocean. The majority of commercial catches across the Pacific Ocean is by purse seine fleets, while catches are dominated by longline fleets in the Indian and Atlantic Oceans. Various conservation measures have been introduced by the regional fisheries management organisations which apply to particular sized vessels and fleets and include measures such as spatial and temporal closures, trip duration limits, observer requirements and limits on catches.

== Gallery ==
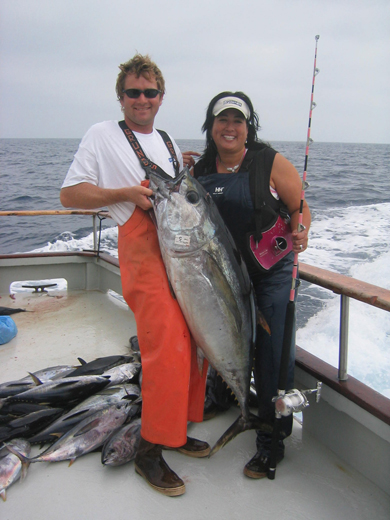
Landed by rod and reel

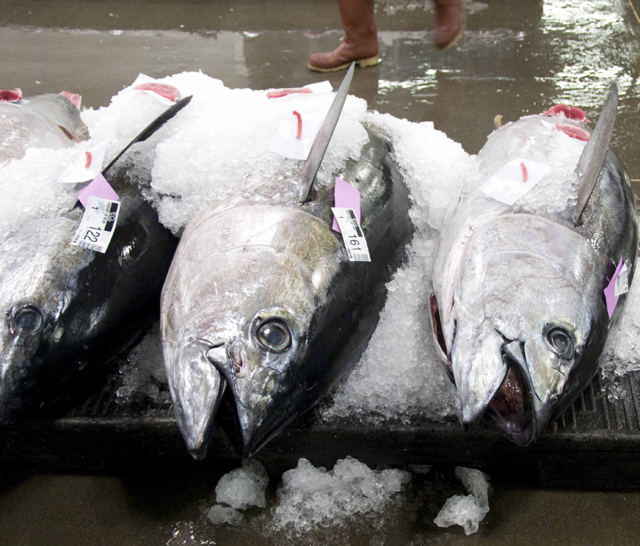
On ice

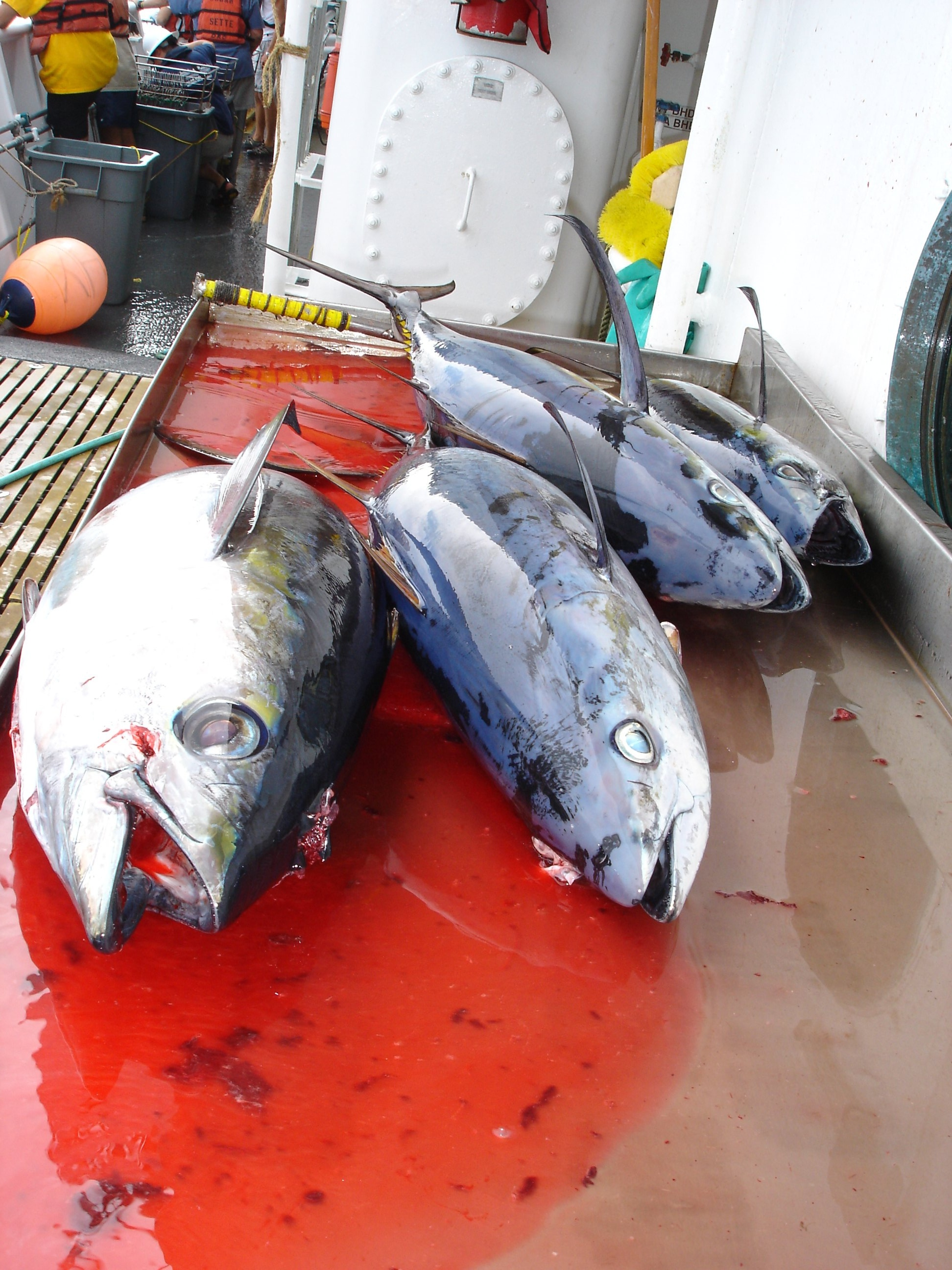

== Threats ==
Bigeye tuna catch rates have declined abruptly during the past half century, mostly due to increased industrial fisheries, with ocean warming adding further stress to the fish species.

Research indicates that increasing ocean temperatures are taking a toll on the tuna in the Indian Ocean, where rapid warming of the ocean has resulted in a reduction of marine phytoplankton.

== Conservation ==
Most seafood sustainability guides encourage consumption of other types of tuna. In 2010, Greenpeace International added bigeye tuna to its seafood red list. "The Greenpeace International seafood red list is a list of fish that are commonly sold in supermarkets around the world, and which have a very high risk of being sourced from unsustainable fisheries."
