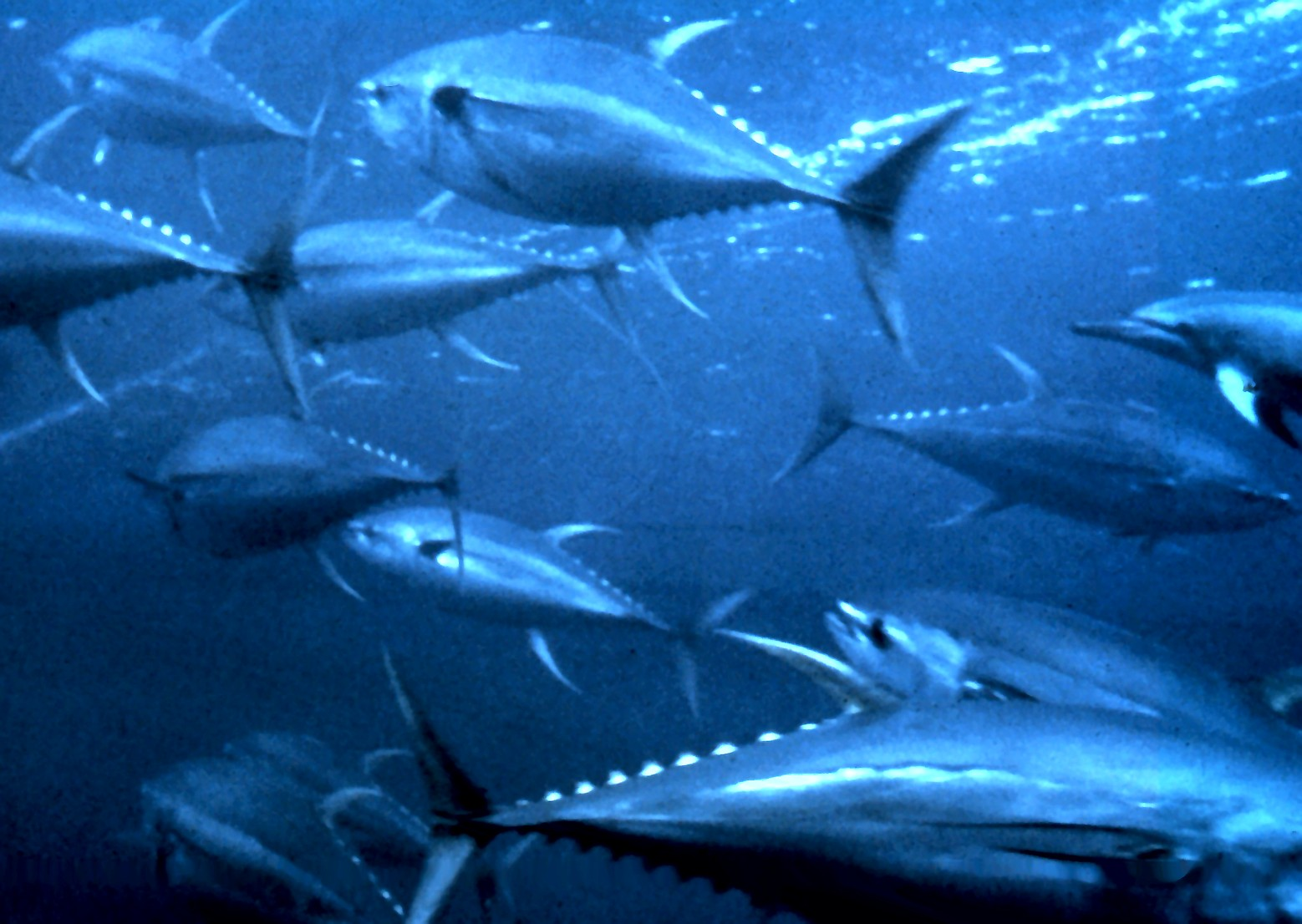
- Yellowfin tuna
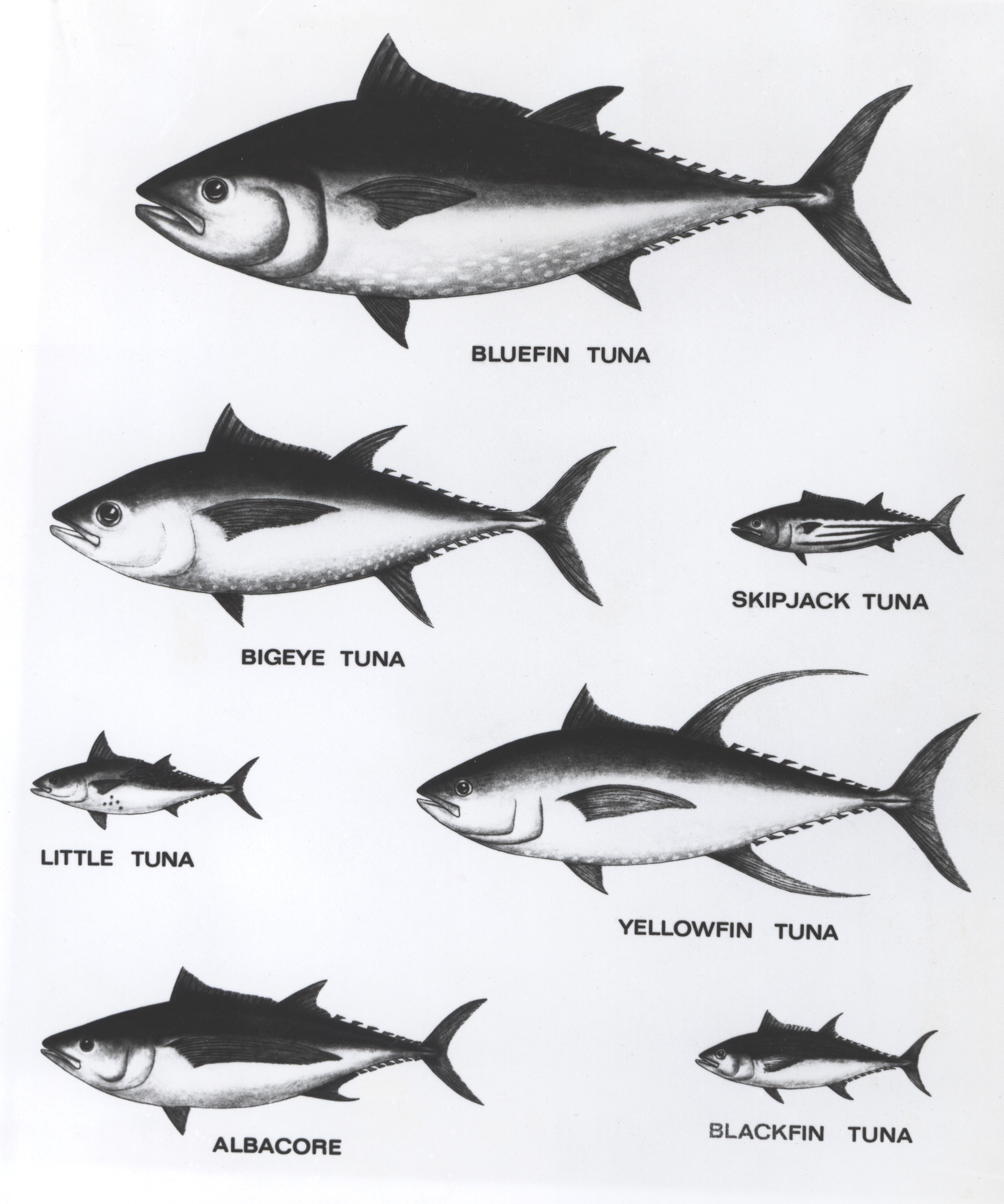
- Relative sizes of various tunas, with the Atlantic bluefin tuna (top) at about 8 ft (2.4 m) in this sample

Scientific classification
- Kingdom: Animalia
- Phylum: Chordata
- Class: Actinopterygii
- Division: Teleostei
- Order: Scombriformes
- Family: Scombridae
- Tribe: Thunnini
- Genus: Thunnus; South, 1845

Type species
- Scomber thynnus Linnaeus, 1758

Synonyms
- List: * Thynnus Cuvier, 1816; Orcynus Cuvier, 1816; Albacora Jordan, 1888; Germo Jordan, 1888; Neothunnus Kishinouye, 1923; Parathunnus Kishinouye, 1923; Parathynnus Kishinouye, 1923; Kishinoella Jordan & Hubbs, 1925; Kishincella; Semathunnus; Thinnus; Thunus

= Thunnus =

True tunas Temporal range: Early Oligocene–present

Genus of fishes

Thunnus is a genus of ocean-dwelling, ray-finned bony fish from the mackerel family, Scombridae. More specifically, Thunnus is one of five genera which make up the tribe Thunnini – a tribe that is collectively known as the tunas. Also called the true tunas or real tunas, Thunnus consists of eight species of tuna (more than half of the overall tribe), divided into two subgenera.

Their coloring, metallic blue on top and shimmering silver-white on the bottom, helps camouflage them from above and below. Atlantic bluefin tuna, the largest member of this genus, can grow to 15 feet (4.6 m) long and weigh up to 1,500 pounds (680 kg). All tunas are extremely strong, muscular swimmers, and the yellowfin tuna is known to reach speeds of up to 50 miles per hour (80 km/h) when pursuing prey. As with all tunas, members of this genus are warm-blooded, which is a rare trait among fish; this enables them to tolerate cold waters and to dive to deeper depths. Bluefin tunas, for example, are found in Newfoundland and Iceland, and also in the tropical waters of the Gulf of Mexico and the Mediterranean Sea, where some individuals go each year to spawn.

Due to overfishing, the range of this genus has declined significantly, having been effectively extirpated from the Black Sea, for example.

== Taxonomy ==
The word Thunnus is the Middle Latin form of the Greek thýnnos (θύννος, "tuna, tunny") – which is in turn derived from thynō (θύνω, "to rush; to dart"). The first known written use of the word was by Homer.

Previous taxonomic treatments, such as the one from a 1997 paper using morphology and short-length mitochondrial DNA sequence data, considered the genus Thunnus to have two subgenera: Thunnus (Thunnus) (the bluefin group), and Thunnus (Neothunnus) (the yellowfin group). However this classification has been questioned by a phylogenetic analysis of nuclear DNA sequence data, which resolved different relationships among species and did not support the traditional definition of the bluefin and yellowfin groups; the subgenera as previously defined did not form discrete clades. Other analyses also supported the division of the Pacific and Atlantic bluefin Tunas into two separate species and suggested that Bigeye Tuna were closer to the yellowfin. Earlier nuclear ribosomal DNA phylogenetic reconstructions also showed similar results.

The following are two cladograms based on phylogenetic analyses of genus Thunnus:

Diaz-Arce et al. 2016

- - - - - - T. albacares
          - T. obesus
        - - T. tonggol
          - T. atlanticus
      - T. maccoyii
    - - T. thynnus
      - T. orientalis
  - T. alalunga

Brownstein et al. 2026

- - - Katsuwonus pelamis
    - Auxis
  - Euthynnus
- Thunnus
  - Thunnus alalunga
  - - - Thunnus orientalis
      - Thunnus thynnus
    - - Thunnus maccoyii
      - - - Thunnus albacares
          - Thunnus obesus
        - - Thunnus atlanticus
          - Thunnus tonggol

Seven Thunnus species were previously thought to exist, and Atlantic bluefin tuna and Pacific bluefin tuna were subspecies of a single species. In 1999, Collette established that based on both molecular and morphological considerations, they are, in fact, distinct species. Currently, this genus has eight species and no subgenera, though the following table depicts the subgeneric treatment:

Thunnus, the true tunas
Image	Common name	Scientific name	Maximum length	Common length	Maximum weight	Maximum age	Trophic level	Source	IUCN status
Thunnus (Thunnus) – the bluefin group
	Albacore tuna	T. alalunga (Bonnaterre, 1788)	1.4 m (4.6 ft)	1.0 m (3.3 ft)	60.3 kg (133 lb)	9–13 yrs	4.31		Least Concern
	Southern bluefin tuna	T. maccoyii (Castelnau, 1872)	2.45 m (8.0 ft)	1.6 m (5.2 ft)	260 kg (570 lb)	20–40 yrs	3.93		Endangered
	Bigeye tuna	T. obesus (Lowe, 1839)	2.5 m (8.2 ft)	1.8 m (5.9 ft)	210 kg (460 lb)	5–16 yrs	4.49		Vulnerable
	Pacific bluefin tuna	T. orientalis (Temminck & Schlegel, 1844)	3.0 m (9.8 ft)	2.0 m (6.6 ft)	450 kg (990 lb)	15–26 yrs	4.21		Near Threatened
	Atlantic bluefin tuna	T. thynnus (Linnaeus, 1758)	4.6 m (15 ft)	2.0 m (6.6 ft)	684 kg (1,508 lb)	35–50 yrs	4.43		Least Concern
Thunnus (Neothunnus) – the yellowfin group
	Blackfin tuna	T. atlanticus (Lesson, 1831)	1.1 m (3.6 ft)	0.7 m (2.3 ft)	22.4 kg (49 lb)		4.13		Least concern
	Longtail tuna, northern bluefin tuna, tongol tuna	T. tonggol (Bleeker, 1851)	1.45 m (4.8 ft)	0.7 m (2.3 ft)	35.9 kg (79 lb)	18 years	4.50		Data deficient
	Yellowfin tuna	T. albacares (Bonnaterre, 1788)	2.4 m (7.9 ft)	1.5 m (4.9 ft)	200 kg (440 lb)	5–9 yrs	4.34		Least Concern

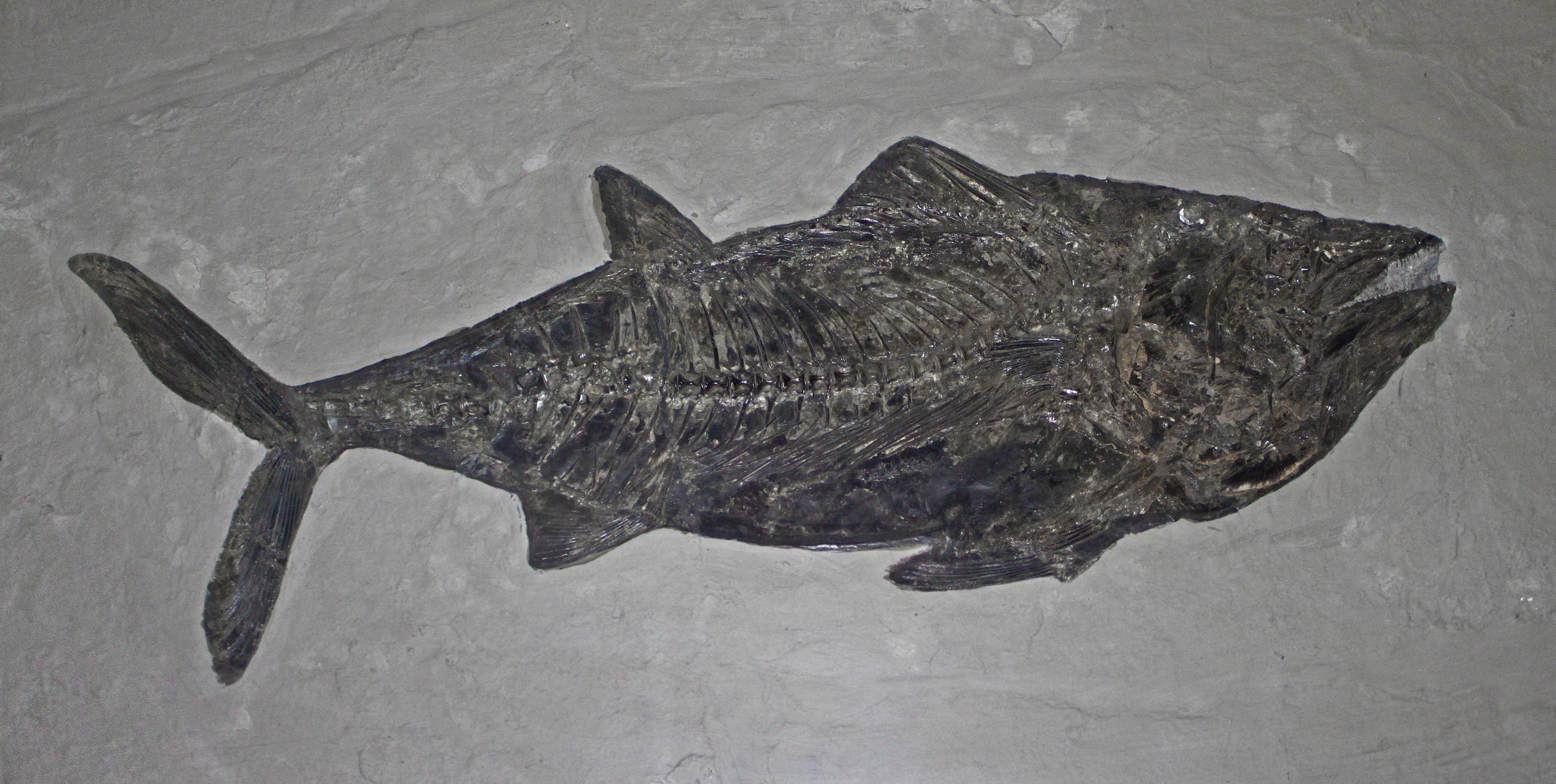
Fossil specimen

The following fossil species are also known:

- †Thunnus krambergeri Pauca, 1931 - Early Oligocene of the Czech Republic
- †Thunnus starksi (Jordan, 1925) - Late Miocene of California, US

In addition, two potential early species are known in "Thunnus" abchasicus Daniltshenko, 1951 from the Middle Eocene of Abkhazia, and "Thunnus" secretus Bannikov, 1979 from the Late Oligocene of Ukraine. Both these species are only provisionally placed in Thunnus, as they share close anatomical similarities, but display fin spines in the second dorsal and anal fins, which are not present in modern Thunnus. This may indicate that these species likely fall outside the modern Thunnus crown group. This is further supported by phylogenetic studies that have found that modern Thunnus species represent a rapid radiation that occurred within the last 10 million years. Other early scombrids previously classified in Thunnus, such as those from the Early Eocene deposits of Monte Bolca in Italy, are now thought to represent different extinct genera.

== Overfishing ==
The worldwide demand for sushi and sashimi, coupled with increasing population growth, has resulted in global stocks of the species being overfished and bluefin is the most endangered and considered "a serious conservation concern". Complicating the efforts for sustainable management of bluefin fish stocks within national exclusive economic zones (EEZ) is bluefin migrate long distances and hunt in the midocean that is not part of any country's EEZ, so have been vulnerable to overfishing by multiple countries' fishing fleets. International agreements and conventions are good-faith agreements and are difficult to monitor or enforce. Though this fish has been farmed in captivity by the Japanese and by the Australians with the help of the Japanese, yields are lower than other farmed fish due to the slow growth rate of bluefin tuna, therefore keeping prices high. On December 30, 2012, a 222-kilogram (489 lb) bluefin tuna caught off northeastern Japan, was sold at the Tsukiji fish market in Tokyo for a record 155.4 million yen ($1.76 million) – a unit price of JP¥ 1.274 million/kg (US$3,600/lb).
