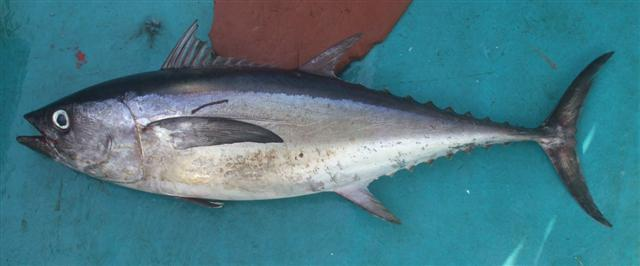

Conservation status
- Data Deficient (IUCN 3.1)

Scientific classification
- Kingdom: Animalia
- Phylum: Chordata
- Class: Actinopterygii
- Order: Scombriformes
- Family: Scombridae
- Genus: Thunnus
- Subgenus: Neothunnus
- Species: T. tonggol

Binomial name
- Thunnus tonggol (Bleeker, 1851)

Synonyms
- Thynnus tonggol Bleeker, 1851; Kishinoella rara (Kishinouye, 1915); Kishinoella tonggol (Bleeker, 1851); Neothunnus tonggol (Bleeker, 1851); Neothunnus rarus (Kishinouye, 1915); Thunnus nicolsoni Whitley, 1936; Thunnus rarus Kishinouye, 1915

= Thunnus tonggol =

Species of tuna

Thunnus tonggol is a species of tuna of tropical Indo-West Pacific waters.

It is commonly known as the longtail tuna or northern bluefin tuna. The usage of the latter name, mainly in Australia to distinguish it from the southern bluefin tuna, leads to easy confusion with Thunnus thynnus of the Atlantic and Thunnus orientalis of the North Pacific. Compared to these "true" bluefins, Thunnus tonggol is more slender and has shorter pectoral fins.

Thunnus tonggol reaches 145 centimetres (57 in) in length and 35.9 kilograms (79 lb) in weight. Compared to similar-sized tunas, its growth is slower and it lives longer, which may make it vulnerable to overfishing.

== See also ==
- List of fish in the Red Sea
- List of fishes of India
