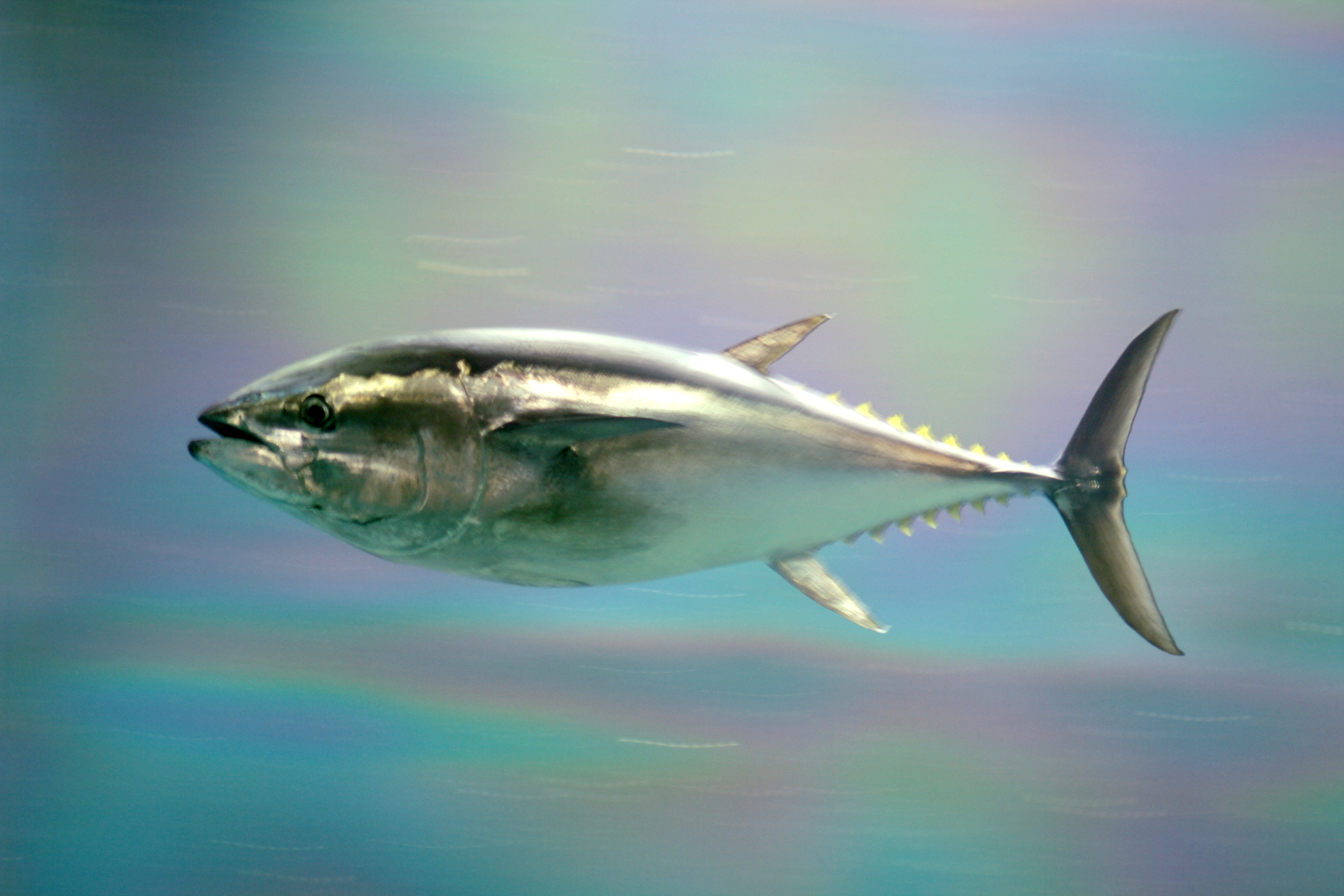
- At Tokyo Sea Life Park, Japan

Conservation status
- Near Threatened (IUCN 3.1)

Scientific classification
- Kingdom: Animalia
- Phylum: Chordata
- Class: Actinopterygii
- Division: Teleostei
- Order: Scombriformes
- Family: Scombridae
- Genus: Thunnus
- Subgenus: Thunnus
- Species: T. orientalis

Binomial name
- Thunnus orientalis (Temminck and Schlegel, 1844)

Synonyms
- Thunnus saliens Jordan and Evermann, 1926; Thynnus orientalis Temminck and Schlegel, 1844; Thunnus thynnus orientalis (Temminck and Schlegel, 1844)

= Pacific bluefin tuna =

Species of fish

The Pacific bluefin tuna (Thunnus orientalis) is a predatory species of tuna found widely in the northern Pacific Ocean, but it is migratory and also recorded as a visitor to the south Pacific.

In the past it was often included in T. thynnus, the 'combined' species then known as the northern bluefin tuna (when treated as separate, T. thynnus is called the Atlantic bluefin tuna). It may reach as much as 3 m (9.8 ft) in length and 450 kg (990 lb) in weight.

Like the closely related Atlantic bluefin and the more distantly related southern bluefin, the Pacific bluefin is a commercially valuable species and several thousand tonnes are caught each year. It was considered overfished and subject to overfishing for decades, but catches were reduced in 2011 in order to rebuild the stock and a 2024 stock assessment determined that the species had rebuilt and was no longer overfished nor subject to overfishing. It is now considered a management success. Monterey Bay Aquarium's Seafood Watch program lists Pacific bluefin tuna as a "Good Alternative".

== Distribution ==
The Pacific bluefin tuna is primarily found in the North Pacific, ranging from the East Asian coast to the western coast of North America. It is mainly a pelagic species found in temperate oceans, but it also ranges into the tropics and more coastal regions. It typically occurs from the surface to 200 m (660 ft), but has been recorded as deep as 550 m (1,800 ft).

It spawns in the northwestern Philippine Sea (e.g., off Honshu, Okinawa and Taiwan) and in the Sea of Japan. Some of these migrate to the East Pacific and return to the spawning grounds after a few years. It has been recorded more locally as a visitor to the Southern Hemisphere, including off Australia, New Zealand, the Gulf of Papua and French Polynesia.

The species is considered to consist of only one stock.

== Physiology ==
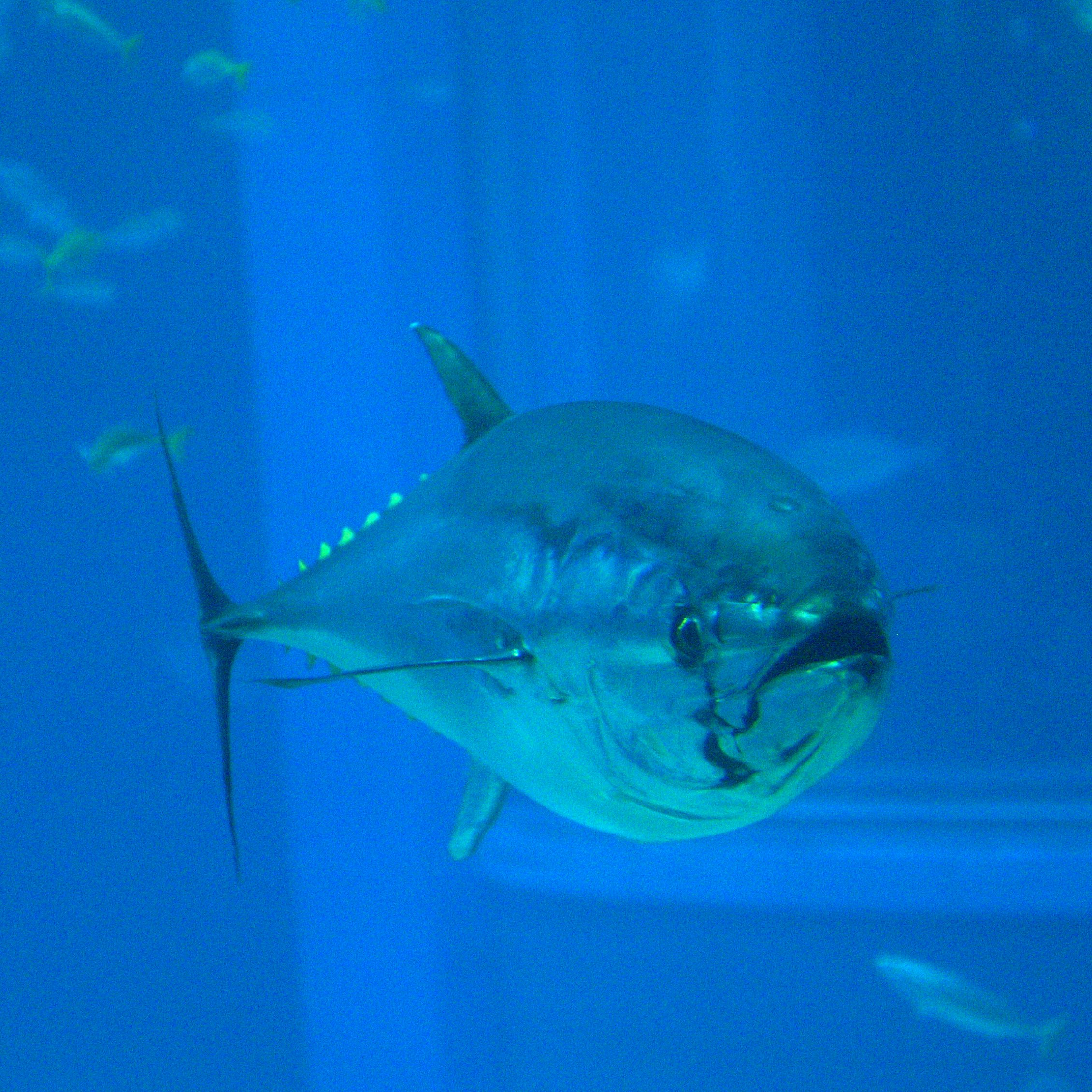
At Osaka Aquarium Kaiyukan, Japan

=== Thermoregulation ===
Almost all fish are cold-blooded (ectothermic). However, tuna, opah, and mackerel sharks are warm-blooded: they can regulate their body temperature. Warm-blooded fish possess organs near their muscles called retia mirabilia that consist of a series of minute parallel veins and arteries that supply and drain the muscles. As the warmer blood in the veins returns to the gills for fresh oxygen it comes into close contact with cold, newly oxygenated blood in the arteries. The system acts as a counter-current heat exchanger and the heat from the blood in the veins is given up to the colder arterial blood rather than being lost at the gills. The net effect is less heat loss through the gills. Fish from warmer water elevate their temperature a few degrees whereas those from cold water may raise it as much as 20 °C (68 °F) warmer than the surrounding sea.

The tuna's ability to maintain body temperature has several definite advantages over other sea life. It need not limit its range according to water temperature, nor is it dominated by climatic changes. The additional heat supplied to the muscles is also advantageous because of the resulting extra power and speed.

== Life cycle ==
Pacific bluefin tunas reach maturity at about 5 years of age, the generation length is estimated at 7–9 years and based on two separate sources the longevity is 15 years or 26 years. At maturity it is about 1.5 m (4 ft 11 in) long and weighs about 60 kg (130 lb). Individuals that are 2 m (6 ft 7 in) long are regularly seen, and the maximum reported is 3 m (9.8 ft) in length and 450 kg (990 lb) in weight. Elsewhere, a mass of up to 550 kg (1,210 lb) has been reported for the species. According to the International Game Fish Association, the all-tackle game fish record was a 411.6 kg (907 lb) individual (Donna Pascoe) caught on 19 February 2014 onboard charter boat Gladiator during the National Tournament.

Spawning occurs from April to August, but the exact timing depends on the region: Early in the northwest Philippine Sea (the southern part of its breeding range) and late in the Sea of Japan (the northern part of its breeding range). Large females can carry more eggs than small ones, and between 5 million and 25 million eggs have been reported.

Pacific bluefins eat various small schooling squids (such as Abraliopsis felis) and fishes (such as anchovies, jack mackerel, Pacific mackerel, lanternfish (Hygophum benoiti and Myctophum nitidulum), Pacific saury, rock fish and sardines), but have also been recorded taking sessile animals and crustaceans such as pelagic red crabs, krill and Daphnia.

== Human interaction ==
Capture (blue) and aquaculture (green) production of Pacific bluefin tuna (Thunnus orientalis) in thousand tonnes from 1950 to 2022, as reported by the FAO

=== Commercial fishery ===
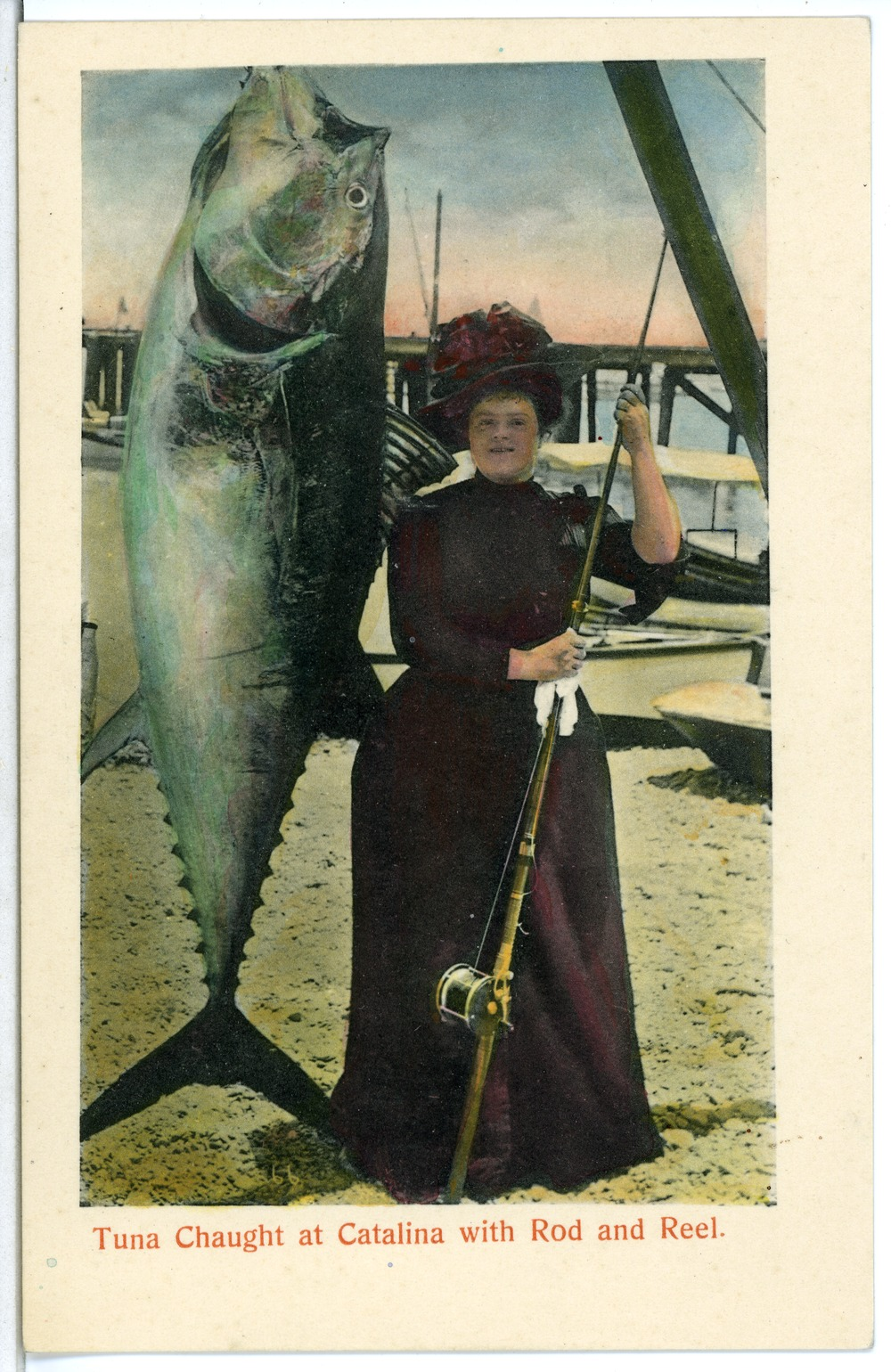
Pacific bluefin caught near Catalina Island, California, US in 1913

Pacific bluefin tuna support a large commercial fishery.

=== Aquaculture ===
Japan is both the biggest consumer and the leader in tuna farming research. Kinki University of Japan first successfully farmed already-hatched bluefin tuna in 1979. In 2002, they succeeded in breeding them, and in 2007, the process was repeated for a third generation. This farm-raised tuna is now known as Kindai tuna. Kindai is a contraction of Kinki University (Kinki daigaku).

=== Conservation ===
Unlike the other bluefins (Atlantic and southern), the Pacific bluefin tuna was not considered threatened initially, resulting in a Least Concern rating in 2011. In 2014, it was found to be threatened and the status was changed to Vulnerable. The current status is listed as Near threatened. Based on a 2024 stock assessment, it was considered to have been rebuilt and not overfished, nor subject to overfishing.

According to the 2024 stock assessment by the International Scientific Committee for Tuna and Tuna-Like Species in the North Pacific Ocean (ISC), the population has increased from a low point of about 2 percent of historic levels in 2010 to about 23 percent in 2020. This has coincided with a reduction in fishing mortality due to stricter management measures. The International Union for Conservation of Nature (IUCN) classifies the population as "Near Threatened", although that designation has not been updated since the stock was found to have been rebuilt.

Catches have ranged between about 8,000 and 40,000 tonnes since 1952.

Its wide range and migratory behavior lead to some problems, since fisheries in the species are managed by several different Regional Fisheries Management Organisations that have sometimes given conflicting advice. The IUCN have recommended that the responsibility be moved to a single organisation. Other recommendations include a substantial reduction of fishing of this species, especially juveniles. In the past, as much as 90% of the caught Pacific bluefins are juveniles.

Monterey Bay Aquarium's Seafood Watch program lists Pacific bluefin tuna as a "Good Alternative".

=== Mercury levels ===
Pacific bluefin flesh may contain levels of mercury or PCBs that are harmful to humans who consume it. A similar problem exists in other tuna species.

=== Cuisine ===
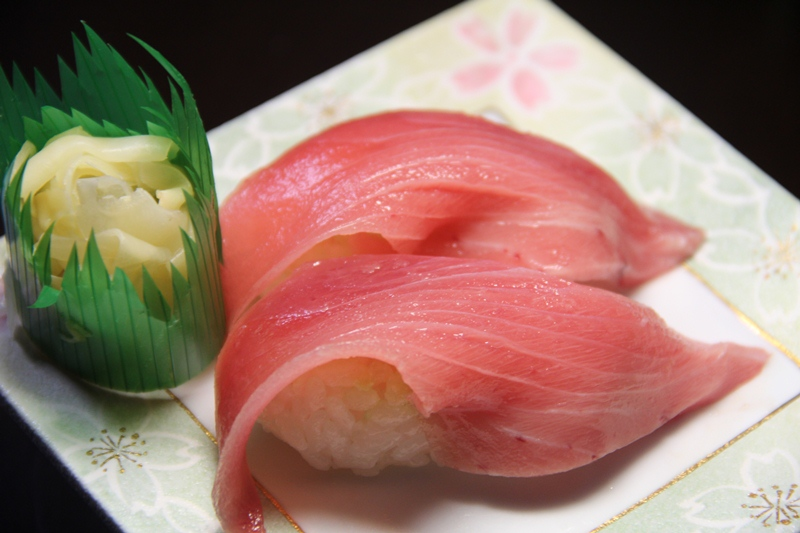
Sushi made with toro, the raw belly meat of bluefin tuna

About 80% of the Pacific and Atlantic bluefin tunas are consumed in Japan, and tunas that are particularly suited for sashimi and sushi can fetch very high prices. The fatty belly meat is known as toro, and prized by sushi chefs. In Japan, some foods made available for the first time of the year are considered good luck, especially bluefin tuna. Winning these new year auctions is often used as a way to get publicity, which raises the prices considerably higher than their usual market value: on 5 January 2013, a 489-pound (222 kg) Pacific bluefin tuna caught off northeastern Japan was sold in the first auction of the year at the Tsukiji fish market in Tokyo for a record 155.4 million yen (US$1.76 million) – leading to record unit prices of US$3,603 per pound, or ¥703,167 per kilogram. A 618-pound (280 kg) pacific bluefin tuna sold for 333.6 million yen (US$3.1 million) at a Tokyo's Toyosu fish market on 5 January 2019. The price equates to roughly US$5,000 a pound, close to double the previous record. The fish was caught off Oma in northern Japan.
