= Billfish in the Indian Ocean =

Species of billfish found in the Indian ocean

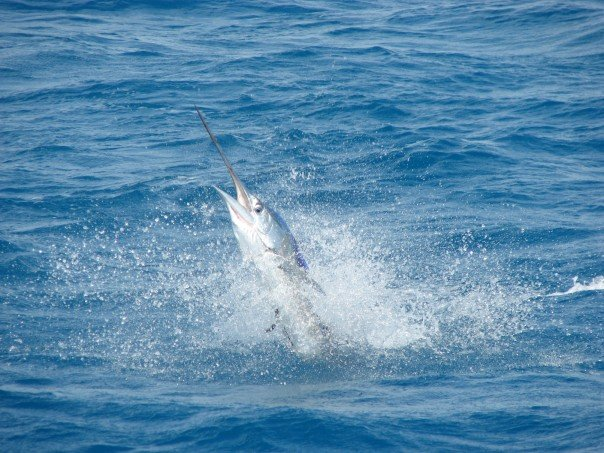

Of the twelve species of billfish, there are six species of Billfish in the Indian Ocean.

== Background ==
The term billfish refers to the large fishes of the family Istiophoridae, comprising marlin and sailfish, and of the family Xiphiidae, comprising swordfish. Billfish are epipelagic and highly migratory fishes found throughout the world's oceans, typically inhabiting the coastal and offshore waters of tropical and temperate oceans. They are normally found in the upper 200 metres of water layers above the thermocline but may occur in depths up to 800 metres. They migrate into temperate or cold waters for feeding and back to tropical waters for spawning.

They are “characterized by the prolongation of the upper jaw, much beyond the lower jaw into a long rostrum which is flat and swordlike (swordfish) or rounded and spearlike (sailfishes, spearfishes and marlins).” All billfish species are sexually dimorphic with the females attaining larger sizes than males. Spawning occurs in tropical waters with eggs hatching into larvae which feed on planktons.

Billfishes are active and voracious apex predators using their long bill to attack and stun their prey by moving their heads in a sideways motion, knocking their prey unconscious and making it easier to catch. They feed on a wide variety of tuna-like fishes, cephalopods and crustaceans.

== Species ==
Of the twelve species of billfish, the following six species are found in the Indian Ocean which comprises the FAO major fishing areas 51 (Western Indian Ocean) and 57 (Eastern Indian Ocean).

Family	Genus	Common name	Scientific name	Maximum length	Maximum weight	Fishbase
Istiophoridae	Makaira	Black marlin	Makaira indica (Cuvier, 1832)	> 448 cm	700 kg	
Istiophoridae	Makaira	Indo-Pacific blue marlin	Makaira mazara (Jordan & Snyder, 1901)	450 cm	900 kg	
Istiophoridae	Tetrapturus	Striped marlin	Tetrapturus audax (Philippi, 1887)	350 cm	200 kg	
Istiophoridae	Tetrapturus	Shortbill spearfish	Tetrapturus angustirostris (Tanaka, 1915)	200 cm	52 kg	
Istiophoridae	Istiophorus	Indo-Pacific sailfish	Istiophorus platypterus (Shaw, 1792)	340 cm	100 kg	
Xiphiidae	Xiphias	Swordfish	Xiphias gladius (Linnaeus, 1758)	455 cm	540 kg	

These six billfish species are not usually targeted by industrial and artisanal fisheries operating throughout the Indian Ocean but are caught and retained as a by-product. These species are important for localised small-scale and artisanal fisheries and recreational fishing.

=== Black Marlin (Makaira indica) ===
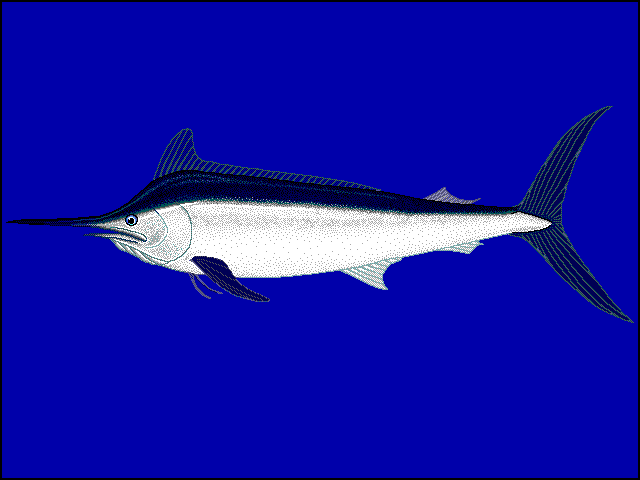
Black Marlin

Black marlin (Makaira indica) inhabits the tropical and subtropical waters of the Indian Ocean between latitudes 25^{o} N and 45^{o} S. M indica is largely considered to be a bycatch of industrial and artisanal fisheries and since the 1990s catches in the Indian Ocean have increased steadily, from 2,800 t in 1991 to over 10,000 t in 2004. In recent years catches have further increased sharply from around 15,000 t in 2013 to over 22,000 t in 2016 and 2017. Gillnets account for around 50% of total catches, followed by longlines (17%), with remaining catches by troll and handlines. Based on 2013-2017 catches, the main fleets are operated by India (27%), Iran (26%), Sri Lanka (18%) and Indonesia (14%).

=== Indo-Pacific blue marlin (Makaira mazara) ===
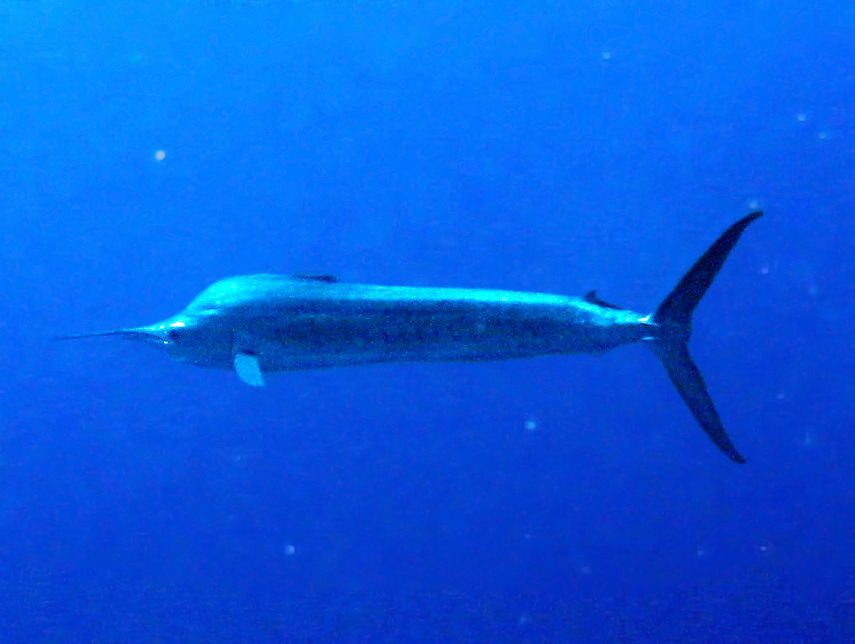
Indo-Pacific Blue Marlin

The Indo-Pacific blue marlin (Makaira mazara) is found primarily in tropical and subtropical waters of the Indian Ocean between latitudes 25^{o} N and 40^{o} to 45°S of the southwestern region and 35°S in the southeastern region.

M mazara is largely a non-target specie of industrial and artisanal fisheries. Western Indian Ocean is the main fishing area operated by longliners which account for 70% of total catches followed by gillnets (24%) with remaining catches by troll and handlines. Catches until the late 1970s were around 3,000 t to 4,000 t and steadily increased to over 10,000 t by the early 1990s and over 17,000 t by 2016. The main fleets, based on 2013-2017 catches, are operated by Taiwan, China (34%), Indonesia (31%), Pakistan (12%), Iran (9%) and Sri Lanka (6%).

=== Striped marlin (Tetrapturus audax) ===
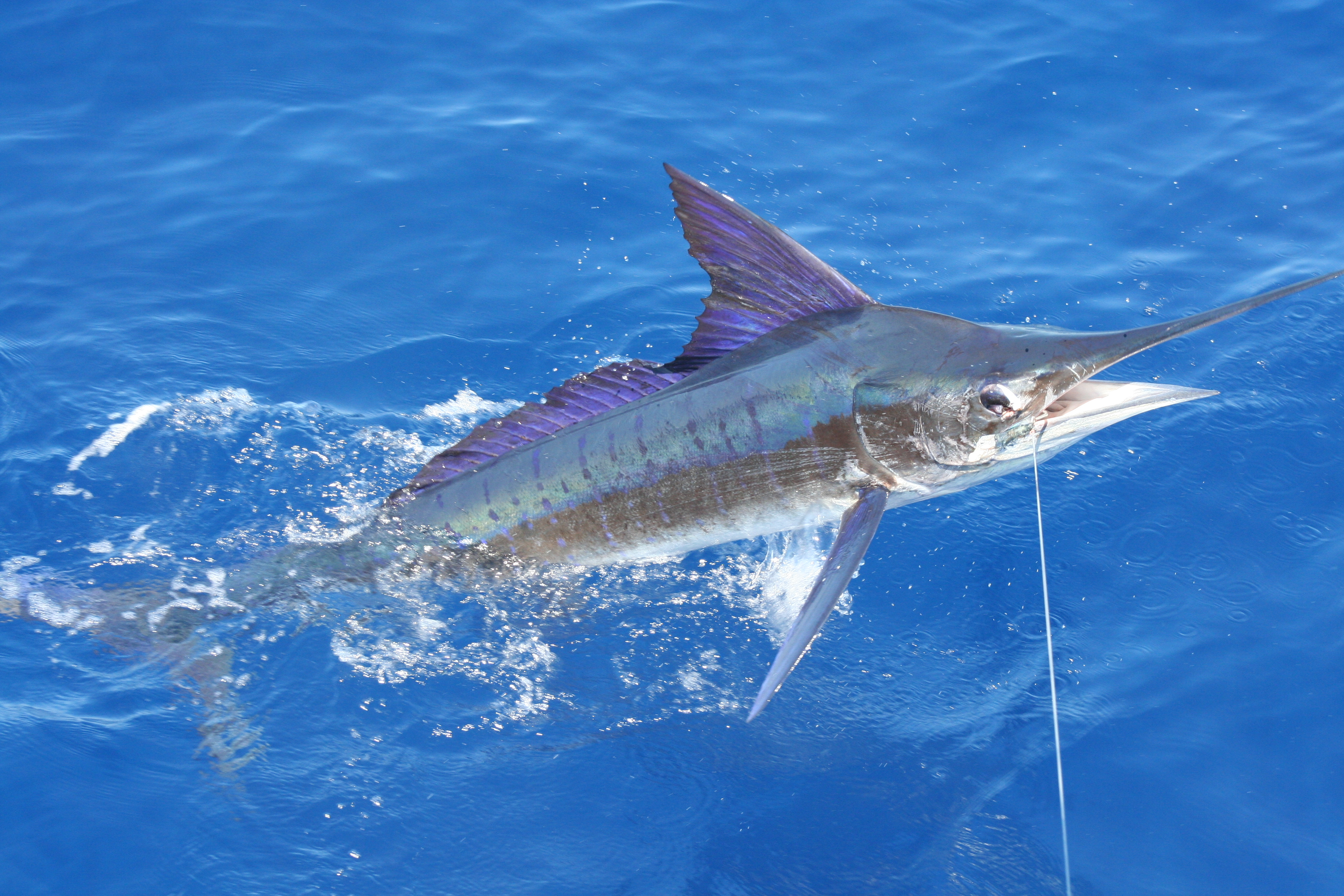
Striped Marlin

Striped marlin (Tetrapturus audax) is found in the Indian Ocean mainly in the tropical, subtropical and temperate waters between latitudes 25^{o} N and as far south as 45°S in the southwestern region and 35°S in the southeastern region. T audax is considered to be a non-target specie of industrial fisheries with catch trends ranging from 2000 t to 8000 t per year. Most of the catch is taken in the north-west Indian Ocean, although catches dropped markedly between 2007 and 2011 due to piracy. Based on 2013-2017 catches, longlines account for around 66% of total catches followed by gillnets (27%). These catches were operated by fleets from Indonesia (37%), Taiwan, China (19%), Iran (16%) and Pakistan (8%).

=== Shortbill spearfish (Tetrapturus angustirostris) ===
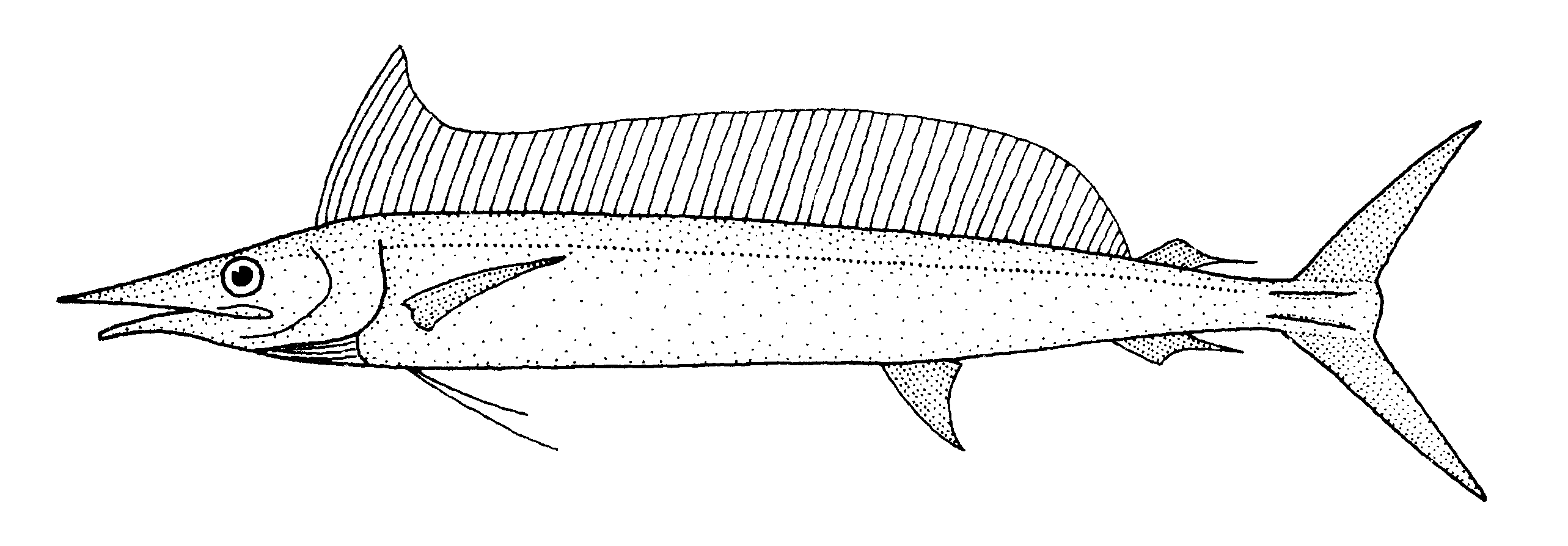
Shortbill Spearfish

Shortbill spearfish (Tetrapturus angustirostris) is an oceanic pelagic fish which does not generally occur in coastal or enclosed waters but is found well offshore. It is found between latitudes 20°N and 35°- 45°S in the Indian Ocean.

=== Indo-Pacific sailfish (Istiophorus platypterus) ===
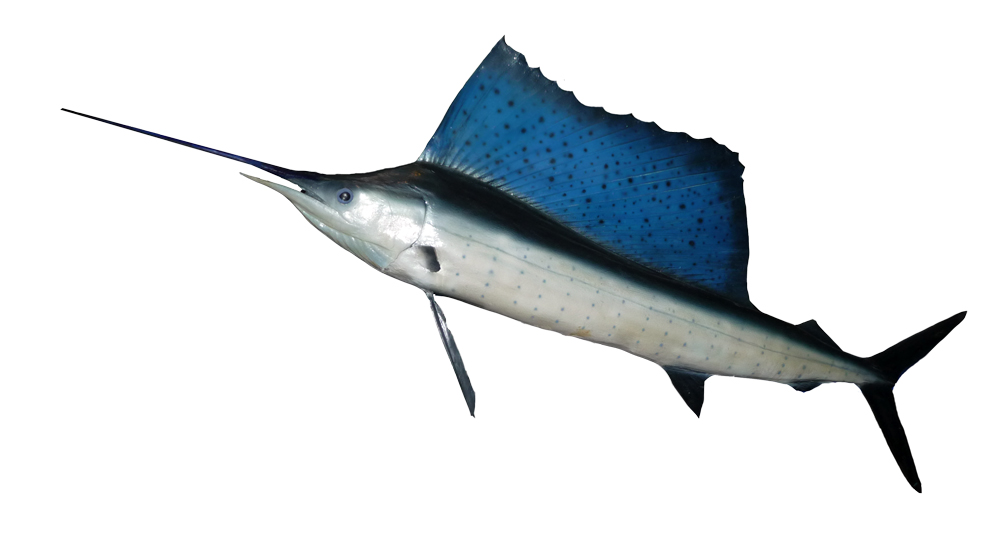
Indo-Pacific Sailfish

The Indo-Pacific sailfish (Istiophorus platypterus) is usually found above the thermocline between latitudes 20°N and 45°S in the western Indian Ocean and 35°S in the eastern Indian Ocean. The main fishing area is the north-west Indian Ocean around the Arabian Sea. Catches increased sharply from around 5,000 t in the mid-1990s to nearly 30,000 t as from 2011 with the development fisheries in Sri Lanka and Iran.

=== Swordfish (Xiphias gladius) ===
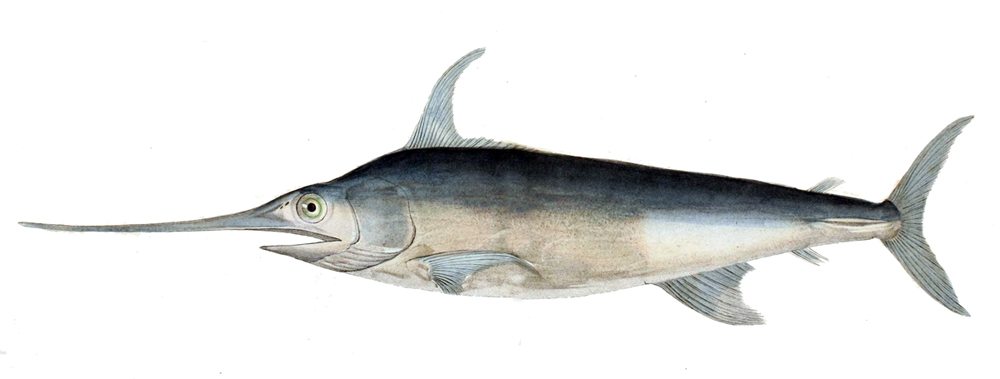
Swordfish

The Swordfish (Xiphias gladius) is a large oceanic apex predator inhabiting all the world's oceans. It is found in the entire Indian Ocean down to latitude 45°S. Before the 1990s X gladius was mainly a non-targeted catch of industrial longline fisheries; but after 1990 catches increased from around 8,000 t to 36,000 t in 1998 with longliner fleets changing their targets from tunas to swordfish. Annual catches decreased during the mid 2000s in response to the piracy threat in the area off Somalia but have improved since 2012 with the control of the threat.

== Fishing of Billfish in the Indian Ocean ==
=== Commercial fishing ===
Commercial fishing in the Indian Ocean started in the early 1950s with Japanese fishing yellowfin and bigeye tuna using longlines and they were followed in the late 1960s by fishing fleets from Taiwan, China and The Republic of Korea. Since 1980 European fleet from Spain, Portugal, France and UK started fishing tuna in the Indian Ocean using purse seine. Up to the early 1980s over 90% of billfishes were taken as incidental bycatch by long line vessels. This has decreased to between 50% and 70% during the past 20 years as billfish catches from offshore gillnet fisheries have become more important for fleets from Iran and Sri Lanka.

Total billfish catch which averaged 10,000Mt in the 1960s and 1970s increased to 75,000Mt by the 2000s. The average catch for 2013-2017 was 113,000Mt with swordfish and Indo-Pacific sailfish accounting for around two thirds of total catches followed by black marlin, blue marlin and striped marlin. In the last few years, 75% of all billfish catches were recorded by five countries comprising Indonesia, Iran, India, Sri Lanka and Taiwan, China. The methods used for commercial fishing of billfish vary greatly by country with Indonesia, Taiwan China and Spain having mainly longline fleets whereas Iran and Pakistan primarily use gillnets.

=== Recreational fishing ===
Billfish are amongst the most prized fish in recreational fishing in the Indian Ocean, along with dorados and tunas. Sport fisheries mainly target Indo-Pacific sailfish, black and blue marlins. Main sport fisheries are located in West Australia, Kenya, Mauritius, La Reunion Island, Seychelles and South Africa.

Sports fishermen go on private fishing boats and while at sea, they tend to follow school of seagulls, as these birds usually dive-hunt for small surface fish. Live baits such as bonitos are used as well as plastic lures mirroring the effects of swimming squids. The fishing trip can take hours usually ending around midday.

Tag and release is commonly used, as it positively impacts conservation and provides important information for the study of the species. There has been over 55,000 recorded tags in East African Indian Ocean waters, mainly compromising of sailfish and marlins.

== Threats ==
Global assessment of the status of billfish indicate most of the stocks are experiencing high mortality rates with some species being overfished. For the last two decades Indian Ocean billfish stocks have been subject to particularly intense fisheries pressure as a result of the increase in longline vessels up to the early 1980s which accounted for over 90% of the total billfish non-targeted catch. Presently all stocks have either been overfished or have been experiencing overfishing with swordfish being the exception. The declining billfish stocks is a result of the growing demand for their meat in the global market as well as for artisanal fisheries in Sri Lanka and Indonesia.

A reduction in fishing pressure was noted in the 2000s attributed to the threats from pirates operating around the horn of Africa off the coast of Somalia. However, with the reduced threat of piracy in recent years, pressure on billfish stocks appears to be increasing again.

The rapid warming over the western Indian Ocean noted during the past six decades has led to a decrease of up to 20% in phytoplankton in this region. The reduction in phytoplankton may add further pressure on the fish stock levels including billfish with the risk of decline to a point of no return.

== Conservation ==
Regional Fisheries Management Organisations (RFMOs) were established to manage and conserve tuna and billfish stocks due to their transnational distributions and widespread economic importance. The billfish population which is exploited or taken as bycatch by multinational fisheries is becoming difficult to regulate due to the non availability of accurate catch data which may not be collected or is aggregated with other species.

The Indian Ocean Tuna Commission (IOTC) was established as an intergovernmental RFMO in 1993 within the framework of the Food and Agriculture Organisation (FAO) of the United Nations for the management of tunas and tuna like species in the Indian Ocean and adjacent seas under the “Agreement for the Establishment of the Indian Ocean Tuna Commission”. The principal objective of the IOTC as stated in Article V, para 1 is to ensure “…. through appropriate management, the conservation and optimum utilization of stocks covered by this Agreement and encouraging sustainable development of fisheries based on such stocks.”

Under this mandate the IOTC reviews the conditions and trends of tuna and billfishes stocks in the Indian Ocean, performs research on these stocks and adopts conservation and management measures.

Membership of the IOTC is open to coastal states of the Indian Ocean or states whose vessels engage in fishing in the Indian Ocean for stocks covered by the Agreement. There are presently 33 states who are members of the IOTC.

With the exception of swordfish, which is a target of commercial fisheries, the status of the other species of billfishes in the Indian Ocean is uncertain with their assessment and management becoming complicated and at times ineffective.

The billfish assessment carried out by the IOTC in 2017 established that the swordfish stock was not overfished and not subject to overfishing. The other four billfish species (black marlin, blue marlin, striped marlin and Indo-Pacific marlin) were either overfished or have been experiencing overfishing.

At its 22nd session held on 21–25 May 2018 the IOTC adopted Resolution 18/05 “On Management Measures for the conservation of the Billfishes: Striped Marlin, Black Marlin, Blue Marlin And Indo-Pacific Sailfish”. The Resolution set catch limits for these four billfishes in order not to exceed their Maximum Sustainable Yield (MSY). The IOTC will review the catch levels and would consider implementing additional conservation and management measures in the event that the catch levels were to exceed the set limits in any two consecutive years as from 2020 onwards.

As a result of the declining billfish population sport fishermen and conservationists have established tag and release program that tag, release and report the billfish catches. The use of tags and data gathered from recaptured billfish provides valuable scientific data on their growth rates, migratory patterns and stock assessment. The African Billfish Foundation was established in 1991 as a nonprofit organisation for conservation and research of the billfish species in the Indian Ocean. It has an active tag and release program with an excess of 55,000 fish tagged. Additionally, the government of Seychelles is encouraging the use of small-scale fisheries in order to sustain the continuous increasing demand for ocean products

Although having strong measures and awareness campaigns, the billfish population is still under threat, with the blue marlin classified as vulnerable by the IUCN Red List.
