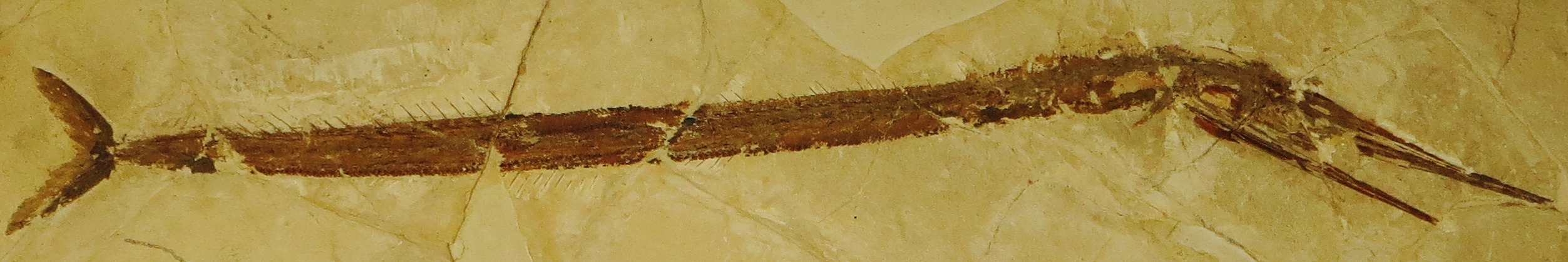
- Fossil specimen of Blochius

Scientific classification
- Kingdom: Animalia
- Phylum: Chordata
- Class: Actinopterygii
- Order: Carangiformes
- Superfamily: Xiphioidea
- Family: †Blochiidae; Bleeker, 1859

Genera
- Blochius; Loancorhynchus

= Blochiidae =

Blochiidae Temporal range: Late Paleocene–Middle Eocene

Blochiidae is an extinct family of small-sized billfish known from the Late Paleocene to the Middle Eocene from the northern Tethys Ocean and the Pacific coast of South America.

Two genera are known:

- Blochius Volta, 1800 (Early Eocene of Italy)
- Loancorhynchus Otero, 2019 (Middle Eocene of Chile)

In addition, an undescribed specimen of a Blochius-like fish is known from the earliest Eocene of Turkmenistan, while another blochiid-like skull (the earliest known fossil billfish) is known from the Late Paleocene of Peru. Indeterminate Blochius-like remains are also known from the Middle Eocene of Uzbekistan.

Other potential blochiids such as Acestrus, Hemirhabdorhynchus, Cylindracanthus and Congorhynchus are based on highly fragmentary remains and it is thus uncertain if they are blochiids, or even billfish for the last two.

Some authorities have found the Blochiidae to be basal billfish not closely related to any extant groups, but more recent studies find them to be more closely related to swordfish (Xiphiidae) than to marlins & sailfish (Istiophoridae).
