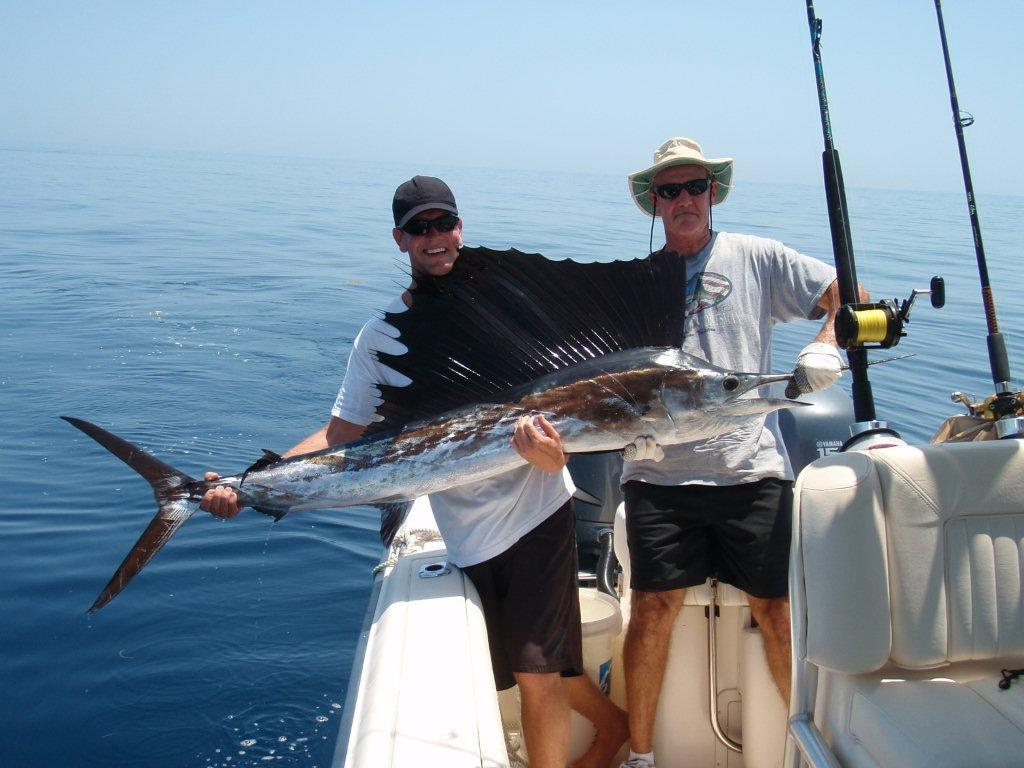
- Two men holding a freshly caught Atlantic sailfish

Scientific classification
- Kingdom: Animalia
- Phylum: Chordata
- Class: Actinopterygii
- Order: Carangiformes
- Family: Istiophoridae
- Genus: Istiophorus
- Species: I. albicans

Binomial name
- Istiophorus albicans (Latreille, 1804)

= Atlantic sailfish =

Species of fish

The Atlantic sailfish (Istiophorus albicans) is a species of marine fish in the family Istiophoridae of the order Istiophoriformes. It is found in the Atlantic Ocean and the Caribbean Sea, except for large areas of the central North Atlantic and the central South Atlantic, from the surface to depths of 200 m (656 ft). The Atlantic sailfish is related to the marlin.

Tests in the 1920s estimated that the Atlantic sailfish was capable of short sprints of up to 111 kilometres per hour (69 mph); however, more conservative estimates of 37 to 55 kilometres per hour (23 to 34 mph) are more widely accepted. More recent studies even suggest sailfish do not exceed swimming speeds of 36 km/h (22 mph).

Atlantic sailfish hunt schooling fish, such as sardines, anchovies and mackerel although they also feed on crustaceans and cephalopods.

== Description ==
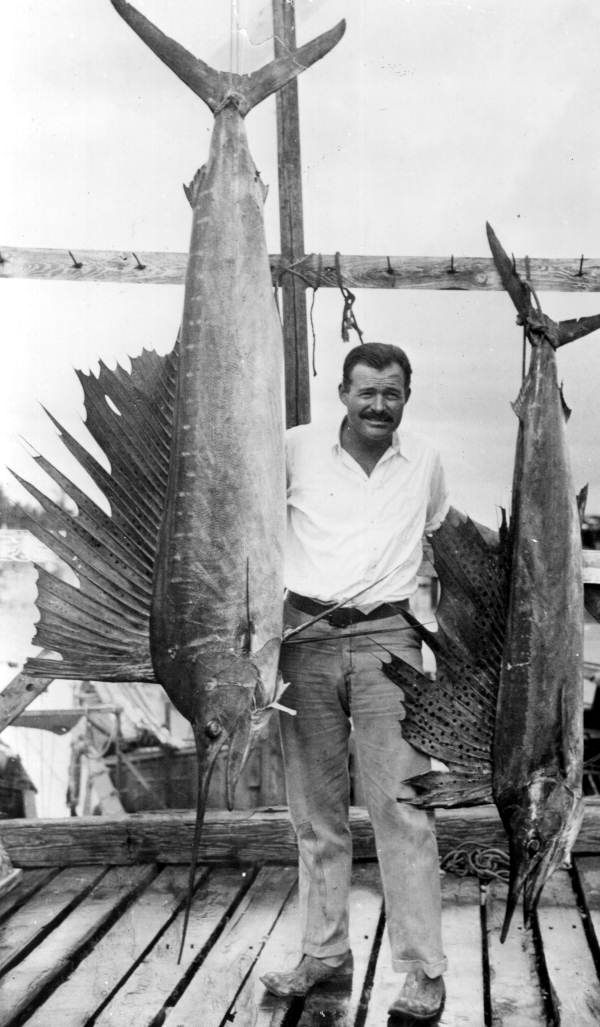
Ernest Hemingway in Key West, Florida, USA, in the 1940s, with an Atlantic sailfish he had caught

The Atlantic sailfish is a metallic blue fish with a large sail-like dorsal fin and a long and pointed bill-like snout. It is dark bluish-black on the upperparts and lighter on the sides (counter-shading), with about twenty bluish horizontal bars along the flanks; the underparts are silvery white. The tail fin is strongly forked. The fins are bluish-black and the front dorsal fin is speckled with small black spots. The bases of the anal fins are pale.

The length of this fish is up to 3.15 m (10.3 ft) and the maximum published weight is 58.1 kg (128.1 lb).

In previous studies, sailfish hunting schools of sardines rely heavily upon stealth and quick slashing or tapping with the rostrum in order to temporarily immobilize prey and facilitate capture in small prey. The adaptive advantage of the bill is highly debated and many different functions have been suggested. The bill has been hypothesized to increase the hydrodynamic qualities of the fish and even to ward off predators. However, it has been well documented that the sailfish utilizes the bill in hunting.

== Distribution and habitat ==
The Atlantic sailfish is a pelagic fish of tropical and temperate waters in the Atlantic Ocean. It ranges from approximately 40°N in the northwestern Atlantic to 40°S in the southwestern Atlantic, and 50°N in the northeastern Atlantic to 32°S in the southeastern Atlantic. It is a migratory species and moves about the open ocean and into the Mediterranean Sea. Its depth range is from warm surface waters down to about 200 m (656 ft).

== Taxonomy ==
Some authorities only recognise a single species of sailfish, Istiophorus platypterus, with I. albicans being treated as a synonym for I. platyperus.
