= Aglyptorhynchus =

Aglyptorhynchus Temporal range: Early Eocene–Early Miocene, 55.8–20.4 Ma

Scientific classification
- Kingdom: Animalia
- Phylum: Chordata
- Class: Actinopterygii
- Division: Teleostei
- Order: Carangiformes
- Family: †Xiphiorhynchidae
- Genus: †Aglyptorhynchus; Casier, 1966

Type species
- †Aglyptorhynchus venablesi Casier, 1966

Species
- See text

Extinct genus of ray-finned fishes

Aglyptorhynchus is an extinct genus of marine billfish that was distributed worldwide from the early Eocene to the early Miocene. Fossils are primarily known from the Northern Hemisphere (both coasts of North America and western/central Europe), but one species is also known to have inhabited the waters off New Zealand.

The following species are known:

- A. columbianus Fierstine, 2005 - Late Oligocene of Washington, US (Lincoln Creek Formation)
- A. denticulatus (Leriche, 1906) - Early Miocene (Aquitanian) of Austria (Melk Formation)
- A. hakataramea Gottfried, Fordyce & Rust, 2012 - Late Oligocene of New Zealand (Otekaike Limestone)
- A. maxillaris Fierstine, 2001 - Late Oligocene of Oregon, US (Yaquina Formation)
- A. sulcatus (Casier, 1946) - Early Eocene of Belgium (Argile des Flandres Formation) and England (London Clay)
- A. venablesi Casier, 1966 - Early Eocene of England (London Clay) and Virginia, US (Nanjemoy Formation)

Indeterminate remains are known from the early and late Oligocene of South Carolina (Ashley & Chandler Bridge formations), the Miocene of Hungary (Törökbálint Formation), and the Early Miocene of North Carolina, US (Pungo River Formation, previously placed in Hemirhabdorhynchus). It has been hypothesized that Aglyptorhynchus originally arose in the Atlantic around the warm Gulf Stream, and migrated to the Pacific by the Oligocene via the then-open Central American Seaway.
