= Heater cell =

Thermogenic muscle cells in some fishes

Heater cells are modified muscle cells specialized for heat production that form the brain-and-eye heater organ of certain large pelagic fish. Found beneath the brain in billfishes, swordfish and the butterfly mackerel, they keep the brain and eyes warmer than the surrounding water, an adaptation known as cranial endothermy. The cells are metabolically very active: their cytoplasm is densely packed with mitochondria, which have been reported to make up as much as roughly 60% of the cell volume, and the heater tissue has an exceptionally high oxidative capacity that is among the highest reported for any vertebrate.

== Distribution ==
Most fish are ectotherms, but several large predatory fishes of the suborder Scombroidei have independently evolved cranial endothermy. A thermogenic heater organ built from heater cells occurs in the billfishes (family Istiophoridae, including marlins, sailfish and spearfishes), in the swordfish (family Xiphiidae), and in the butterfly mackerel Gasterochisma melampus (family Scombridae). A comparable extraocular modification interpreted as an incipient brain heater has also been described in the slender tuna Allothunnus fallai, the most basal tuna species.

== Origin and structure ==
Heater cells are derived from a modified extraocular muscle; in the swordfish and billfishes the heater tissue forms within the superior rectus muscle, one of the muscles that would normally move the eyeball. They are structurally unlike ordinary skeletal muscle: the organized arrays of myofibrils and contractile filaments are almost entirely absent and the nuclei are not positioned at the cell periphery, while the cytoplasm is densely packed with mitochondria together with an elaborate smooth membrane system.

The heater organ is supplied with blood through a vascular heat exchanger (rete mirabile), which reduces the loss of metabolic heat to the gills and helps retain warmth in the brain and eye region.

== Mechanism of heat production ==
Heat is generated by non-shivering thermogenesis at the expense of contractile force. In ordinary muscle, calcium ions released from the sarcoplasmic reticulum (SR) trigger contraction; in heater cells the same calcium-handling machinery is instead thought to drive a "futile" cycle of calcium release and reuptake that consumes ATP and releases heat. Heater cells are rich in the SR calcium-release channel, the ryanodine receptor (RyR), and the SR calcium pump, the Ca2+-ATPase (SERCA). The RyR isoform they express is one also found in fish slow-twitch skeletal muscle, and it has the unusual property of staying open in the presence of adenine nucleotides even when cytoplasmic calcium is elevated, a condition that would normally close the channel. An extensive transverse-tubule network and abundant SR support rapid calcium cycling, while the dense mitochondria provide the ATP and additional heat that fuel the process.

The organ is innervated by a branch of the oculomotor nerve, and heater cells carry large endplate-like clusters of acetylcholine receptors, suggesting that thermogenesis is under nervous control.

== Function ==
The heater organ can warm the brain and eyes by as much as about 14 °C above ambient water temperature. Carey proposed that this protects the central nervous system from rapid cooling during the steep daily vertical movements that carry these fishes through a wide range of water temperatures. Keeping the eyes warm also affects vision: warming the retina raises its temporal resolution (flicker-fusion frequency), which may help these predators detect fast-moving prey in cold, deep water.

== History ==
The brain heater was first described by Francis G. Carey in 1982 in the swordfish, where he identified a mitochondria- and cytochrome c-rich tissue associated with an eye muscle, served by a vascular heat exchanger. The cellular and molecular basis of the organ was subsequently characterized in detail by Barbara Block and colleagues, who described the unusual membrane architecture of the heater cell and the calcium-cycling proteins underlying its thermogenesis. The trait has since been used to study the evolution of endothermy in fishes.

== See also ==
- Endothermy
- Rete mirabile
- Regional heterothermy
