= Acestrus =

Acestrus Temporal range: Lower Eocene

Scientific classification
- Kingdom: Animalia
- Phylum: Chordata
- Class: Actinopterygii
- Division: Teleostei
- Order: Istiophoriformes (?)
- Genus: †Acestrus; Woodward, 1901
- Species: †A. ornatus

Binomial name
- †Acestrus ornatus Woodward, 1901

Extinct genus of ray-finned fishes

Acestrus is an extinct genus of marine ray-finned fish that lived during the lower Eocene in Europe. It contains one species, A. ornatus from the London Clay, known from a single braincase. It is thought to possibly be closely allied with billfish based on the braincase morphology, although it remains uncertain whether it had the rostrum characteristic of billfishes. Some authorities have suggested blochiid affinities.

The former species "A. elongatus" Casier, 1966 is now thought to be remains assigned to Duplexdens.
