= Congorhynchus =

Congorhynchus Temporal range: Maastrichtian to Ypresian

Scientific classification
- Kingdom: Animalia
- Phylum: Chordata
- Class: Actinopterygii
- Genus: †Congorhynchus; Darteville & Casier, 1949

Species
- †C. trabeculatus Darteville & Casier, 1949; ?†C. elliotti (Casier, 1969); ?†C. kinnei (Marsh, 1870)

Extinct genus of fishes

Congorhynchus (Greek for "Congo snout") is an enigmatic, likely polyphyletic genus of prehistoric marine ray-finned fish that was described by E. Darteville and E. Casier in 1949.

It is only known from isolated spines that were previously interpreted as the fossilized rostra of an early billfish (possibly a blochiid). However, this interpretation has fallen out of favor, as they show no distinctive traits of billfish rostra or the rostra of "scombroids" in general. The extreme range of variation between different "species" in the genus also makes it unlikely that all species assigned to this genus are actually members of it.

It contains two to three species, although given the likely polyphyly of this genus, C. trabeculatus may be the only true member:

- †C. trabeculatus Darteville & Casier, 1949 (type species) - Maastrichtian of Kongo Central (the Democratic Republic of the Congo) & Cabinda (Angola), possibly Danian of Niger
- ?†C. elliotti (Casier, 1966) - Maastrichtian of New Jersey, USA (Navesink Formation) and Early Eocene of England (London Clay) (=Hemirhabdorhynchus elliotti Casier, 1966)

The species †C. kinnei (Marsh, 1870) from the early Eocene Manasquan Formation of New Jersey is alternatively placed in this genus or in Embalorhynchus Marsh, 1870.

Fossils belonging to Congorhynchus date back to the Maastrichtian stage of the Late Cretaceous. If the Eocene species (C. elliotti and C. kinnei) are members of this genus, or if the Paleocene fossils from Niger belong to this genus, then Congorhynchus would have survived the Cretaceous–Paleogene extinction event that killed the dinosaurs.

== See also ==
- Cylindracanthus - another enigmatic fish known from similar remains
