= Hemingwaya =

Hemingwaya Temporal range: Earliest Ypresian, 56–55 Ma

Scientific classification
- Kingdom: Animalia
- Phylum: Chordata
- Class: Actinopterygii
- Order: Carangiformes
- Suborder: Menoidei
- Superfamily: Xiphioidea
- Family: †Hemingwayidae; Sytchevskaya & Prokofiev, 2002
- Genus: †Hemingwaya; Sytchevskaya & Prokofiev, 2002
- Species: †H. sarissa

Binomial name
- †Hemingwaya sarissa Sytchevskaya & Prokofiev, 2002

Extinct genus of ray-finned fishes

Hemingwaya is an extinct genus of billfish in the monotypic family Hemingwayidae that lived during the earliest Eocene epoch, approximately 56 to 55 million years ago. It contains a single species, H. sarissa. Members of this family are characterized by their elongated, spear-like bills, a feature that defines modern billfish such as swordfish and marlins. It is known from the Danata Formation of Turkmenistan, which represented a far eastern inland arm of the Tethys Ocean, and was deposited in the earliest Eocene shortly after the Paleocene-Eocene Thermal Maximum. The genus name honors famed author Ernest Hemingway, who prominently featured a marlin in his 1952 novella The Old Man and the Sea, while the species name "sarissa" originates from the Greek word for "spear".

The fossils of Hemingwaya provide insight into the early evolution of billfishes, representing one of the first known lineages to exhibit the characteristic bill-like morphology. These fish were part of the broader group of "billfish-like" species, which evolved specialized hunting adaptations for catching fast-moving prey. While the exact diversity within the family is limited, the fossil record indicates that Hemingwaya were part of the evolutionary stem group that led to the development of modern billfishes.

== Description ==
Hemingwaya sarissa resembled a juvenile specimen of the extant sailfish (Istiophorus platypterus) and had an elongated body. The upper and lower jaws were very elongated. The upper jaw rostrum was formed by the premaxilla . The lower jaw was only slightly shorter than the upper jaw rostrum. Both jaws were covered with small, brush-like teeth. The caudal fin skeleton had two separate hypuralia, and the caudal fin was forked. Of the total of 30 to 40 vertebrae, 15 to 20 supported the abdomen and 15 to 20 supported the caudal fin peduncle. The last five or six vertebrae of the caudal fin peduncle had lateral parapophyses. The head behind the orbits and the sides of the body were covered by six longitudinal rows of scales.
