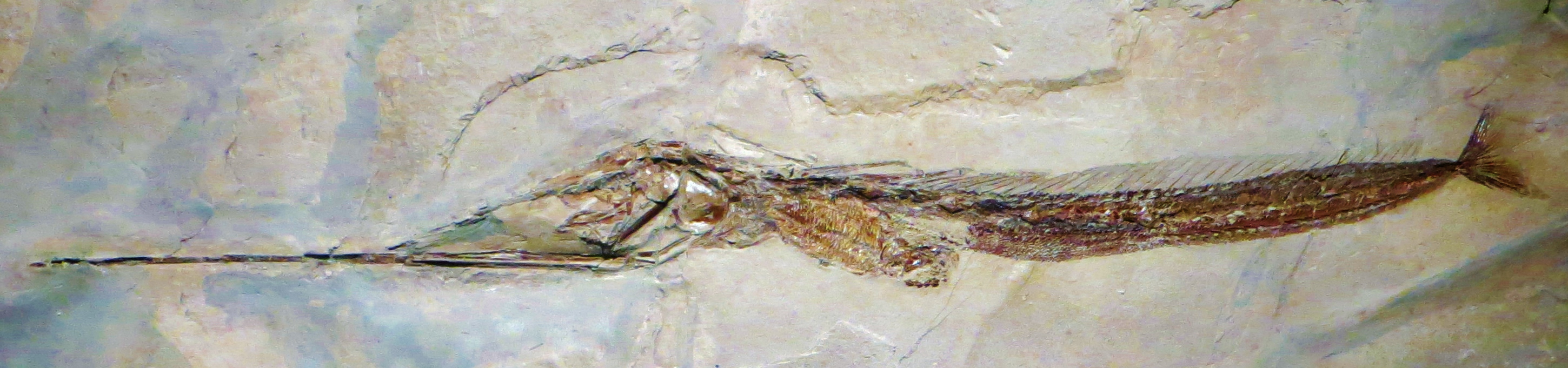
- Blochius longirostris

Scientific classification
- Kingdom: Animalia
- Phylum: Chordata
- Class: Actinopterygii
- Order: Carangiformes
- Suborder: Menoidei
- Superfamily: Xiphioidea
- Family: †Blochiidae
- Genus: †Blochius; Volta, 1800

Species
- B. longirostris; B. macropterus; B. moorheadi

= Blochius =

Blochius Temporal range: Early Eocene

Extinct genus of ray-finned fishes

Blochius is an extinct genus of billfish from the Eocene. It is only known from the Monte Bolca deposits in Italy, and was likely restricted to shallow, tropical waters of the Tethys Ocean.

== Discovery ==
The existence of Blochius was known as early as 1709, where it is mentioned in a written account by Johann Jakob Scheuchzer, who identified a fragment of a Blochius skeleton and identified it as being either related to the Xiphias (swordfish) or Siluro (catfish). It was not until the advent of Linnean taxonomy that it properly received a scientific name by Giovanni Serafino Volta, who named Blochius in 1796 after pioneering ichthyologist Marcus Elieser Bloch.

== Taxonomy ==
It is one of two known definite genera in the family Blochiidae, alongside Loancorhynchus from earlier in the Eocene of Chile.

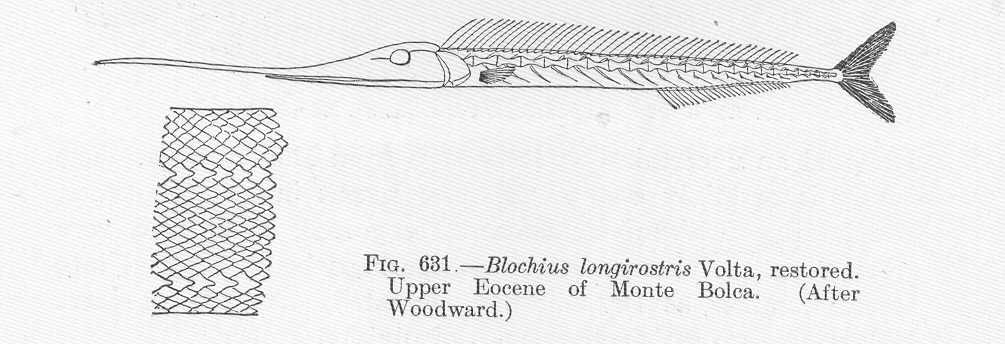
Life restoration

The following species are known, all from Italy:

- Blochius longirostris Volta, 1796
- Blochius macropterus de Zigno, 1887
- Blochius moorheadi Eastman, 1911 (nomen dubium)

== Description ==
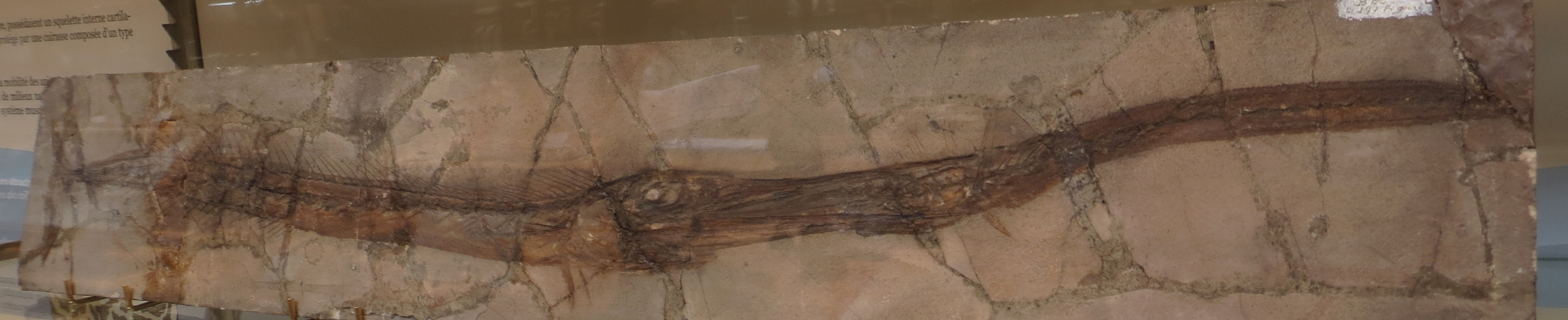
With prey

Blochius had a very slender elongated body, a narrow head with elongated upper and lower jaws and large eyes. Much like its modern relatives such as swordfish, it had an elongated rostrum. Although generally small in size at around 2 feet in length, it could reach a maximum length of 2.155 metres (7.07 ft). The rostrum generally comprised 40% of the body length. It likely hunted in a manner similar to modern needlefish.

== Bibliography ==
- G. S. Volta, Ittiolitologia Veronese del museo Bozziano ora annesso a quello del conte Giovambattista Gazola e di altri gabinetti fossili veronesi con la versione latina, Stamperia Guiliari, Verona, 1796–1808, 323 pp.
- C. R. Eastman, Catalog of fishes in the Carnegie Museum. Part 1. Fishes from the Upper Eocene of monte Bolca. Mem. Carnegie Mus., Pittsburgh 4, 1911. pp. 349–391.
- W. Landini e L. Sorbini. 1996. Ecological and trophic relationships of Eocene monte Bolca (Pesciara) fish fauna, pp 105–112 in A. Cherchi, ed. Autoecology of selected fossil organisms: achievements and problems. Boll. soc. Paleo. Italiana spec 3.
- H. L. Fierstine e K. A. Monsch. 2002. Redescription and phylogenetic relationships of the Family Blochiidae (Perciformes: Scombroidei), middle Eocene, monte Bolca, Italy. Miscellanea Paleontologica, studi e ricerche sui giacimenti terziari di Bolca, mus. civico storia nat. Verona 9: 121–163.
- H. L. Fierstine, 2006. Fossil history of billfishes (Xiphioidei). Bull. Mar. Sci., 79(3): 433–453.
