= Hemirhabdorhynchus =

Hemirhabdorhynchus Temporal range: Early- Middle Eocene

Scientific classification
- Kingdom: Animalia
- Phylum: Chordata
- Class: Actinopterygii
- Division: Teleostei
- Order: Carangiformes
- Superfamily: Xiphioidea
- Genus: †Hemirhabdorhynchus; Casier, 1946

Species
- H. brevirostris Dartevelle & Casier, 1949; H. depressus Casier, 1946; H. ypresiensis Casier, 1946

Extinct genus of fishes

Hemirhabdorhynchus is an extinct genus of prehistoric marine ray-finned fish, presumed to be an early billfish, that lived from the early to middle Eocene of Europe & Africa. It is known only from fragmentary remains of rostra, and thus its exact taxonomic position is uncertain. Under some previous taxonomic treatments, it was considered an ancestor of the modern Tetrapturus.

The following species are known:

- H. brevirostris Dartevelle & Casier, 1949 - Middle Eocene (early Lutetian) of Angola
- H. depressus Casier, 1946 - Early Eocene of Belgium
- H. ypresiensis Casier, 1946 - Early Eocene of Belgium

The former species H. elliotti was moved to the even more enigmatic genus Congorhynchus after the fossil was noted to represent a fin spine rather than a rostrum. Late-surviving records of Hemirhabdorhynchus from the Early Miocene-aged Pungo River Formation of North Carolina, US, are now thought to represent Aglyptorhynchus instead.

== See also ==
- Prehistoric fish
- List of prehistoric bony fish
