= FAO Major Fishing Areas =

Divisions of water for fishery management purposes

The FAO Major Fishing Areas are areas in the world in what the Food and Agriculture Organization has divided the fishery. This definition is required for the statistical data-gathering, the management of fisheries and jurisdictional purposes. The boundaries of the areas were determined on various considerations with consulting international fishery agencies.

== Areas ==
FAO Major Fishing Areas

The defined areas are:

- Area 18: the Arctic Ocean
- Area 21: the Northwestern part of the Atlantic Ocean
- Area 27: the Northeastern part of the Atlantic Ocean
- Area 31: the Western part of the Atlantic Ocean
- Area 34: the Eastern Central part of the Atlantic Ocean
- Area 37: the Mediterranean Sea and the Black Sea
- Area 41: the Southwestern part of the Atlantic Ocean
- Area 47: the Southeastern part of the Atlantic Ocean
- Area 48: the Antarctic part of the Atlantic Ocean
- Area 51: the Western part of the Indian Ocean
- Area 57: the Eastern part of the Indian Ocean
- Area 58: the Antarctic and Southern parts of the Indian Ocean
- Area 61: the Northwestern part of the Pacific Ocean
- Area 67: the Northeastern part of the Pacific Ocean
- Area 71: the Western Central part of the Pacific Ocean
- Area 77: the Eastern Central part of the Pacific Ocean
- Area 81: the Southwestern part of the Pacific Ocean
- Area 87: the Southeastern part of the Pacific Ocean
- Area 88: the Antarctic part of the Pacific Ocean
