= Giovanni Serafino Volta =

Italian priest, naturalist, and palaeontologist (1764–1842)

Giovanni Serafino Volta (27 December 1754 – 6 April 1842) was an Italian priest, naturalist, and palaeontologist, best known for his studies of fossil fish from Monte Bolca.

== Life and works ==
Volta was an Abate (or abbot) and theologian. He was a Canon of the Imperial Basilica in Mantua and the curator of the natural history department at the University of Pavia.

He wrote Ittiolitologia Veronese del Museo Bozziano ora annesso a quello del Conte Giovambattista Gazola e di altri gabinetti di fossili Veronesi con la versione Latina, published at Verona between 1796 and 1809. Illustrated with 76 fine plates this is the first treatise on fossil ichthyology in Italy and describes 123 species of fossil fish from the fossil site of Monte Bolca.

With Louis Agassiz he also wrote Revue critique des poissons fossiles figurés dans l'Ittiolitologia veronese (Neuchatel, 1835).

Most other widely known works include:

- Elementi di Mineralogia Analitica e Sistematica Manimi, 1787
- Prospetto Del Museo Bellisomiano, classificato e compendiosamente descritto (1787).
- Giovanni Serafino Volta (1828). Descrizione del Lago di Garda e de' suoi contorni con osservazioni di storia naturale e di belle arti (in Italian). Mantova: Tipografia Virgiliana di L. Caranenti.
- Chemisch-mineralischer Versuch über die Bäder und Gebürge von Baaden
- Saggio analitico sulle acque minerali di S. Colombano
- Dei Pesci fossili del Veronese, lettera indirizzata al signor abate don Domenico Testa
- Osservazioni di storia naturale sul viaggio da Fiorenzola a Velleja
- Transunto di osservazioni sopra il lago di Garda ed i suoi contorni
- Osservazioni botanico-zoologiche e agrarie sul Riso sativo e lo Scarabeo fruticola
- Lettera sopra alcune sperienze riguardanti il sessualismo dei vegetabili del Sig Canonico Don Giovanni Serafino Volta al Sig Luigi Brugnatelli Biblioteca Fisica d'Europa, Vol. 7

== See also ==
- Blochius longirostris an Eocene fish described by Volta.
- Dasyatis muricata an Eocene stingray described by Volta.
