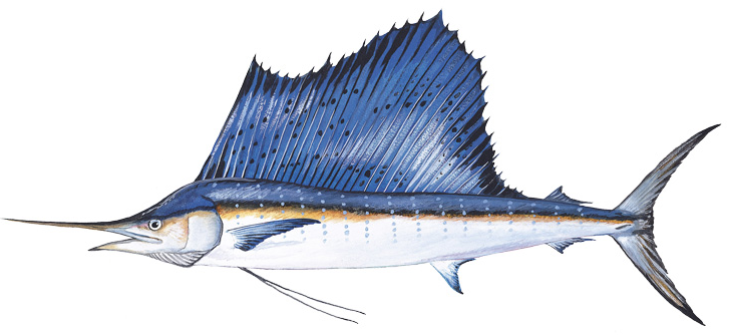
- Atlantic sailfish
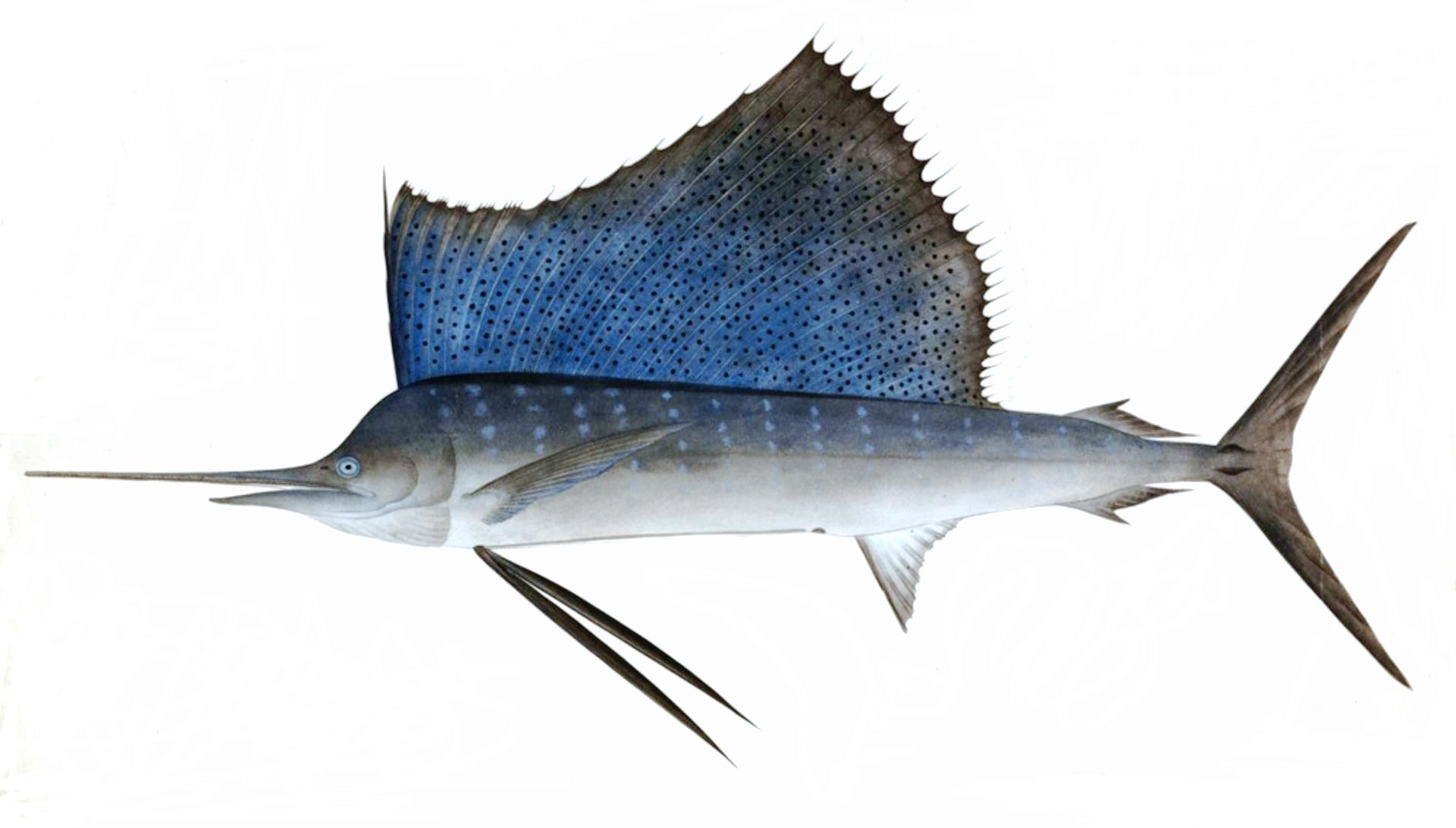
- Indo-Pacific sailfish

Conservation status
- Vulnerable (IUCN 3.1) (Note that the IUCN recognizes one sailfish species)

Scientific classification
- Kingdom: Animalia
- Phylum: Chordata
- Class: Actinopterygii
- Division: Teleostei
- Order: Carangiformes
- Family: Istiophoridae
- Genus: Istiophorus; Lacépède, 1801

Type species
- Scomber gladius (G. Shaw, 1792)

Species
- Istiophorus albicans (Latreille, 1804); Istiophorus platypterus (G. Shaw, 1792)

Synonyms
- Histiophorus G. Cuvier, 1832; Nothistium Hermann, 1804; Zanclurus Swainson, 1839

= Sailfish =

Sailfish Temporal range: 59–0 Ma Paleogene to present

Genus of fishes

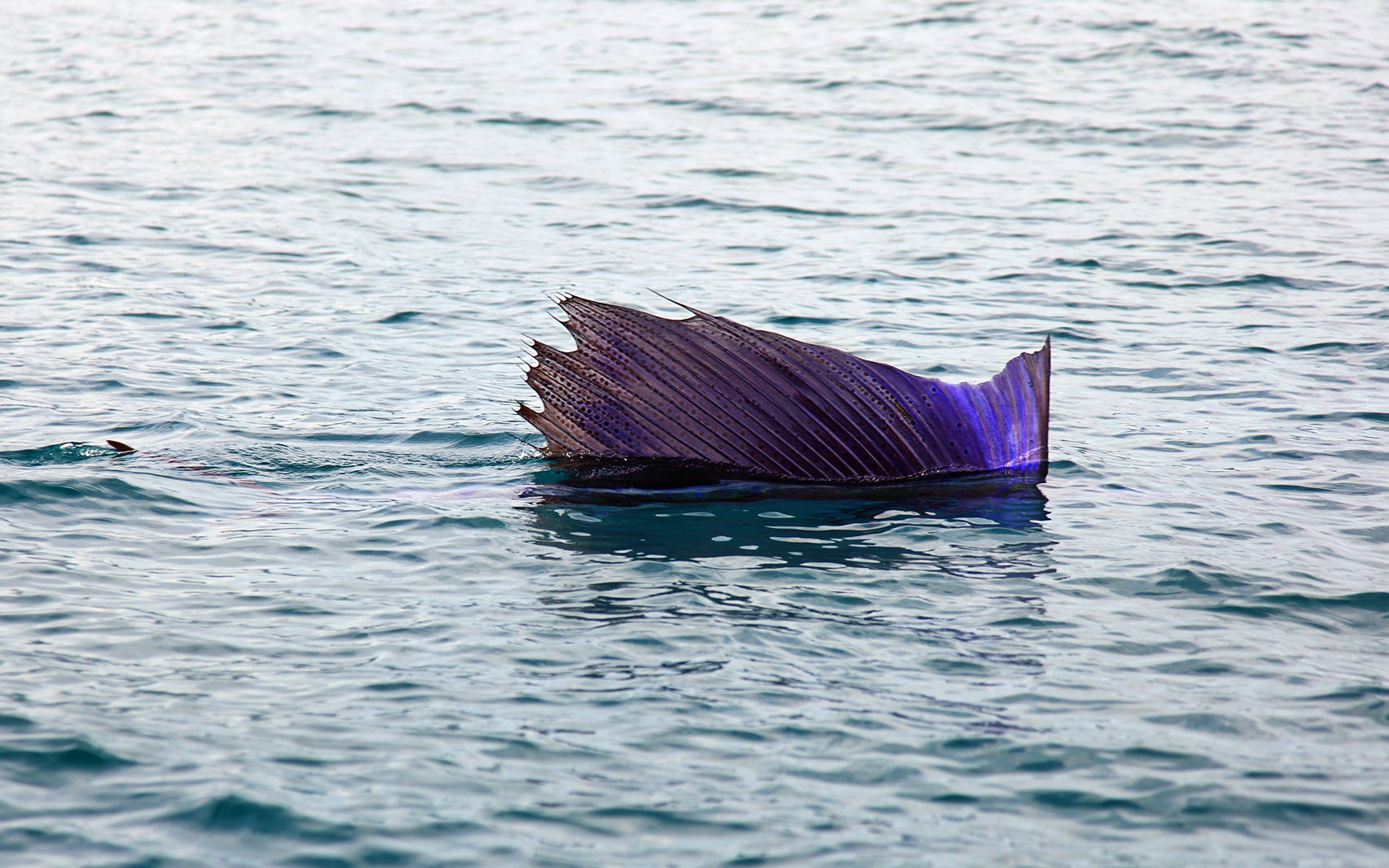
An Indo-Pacific sailfish raising its sail

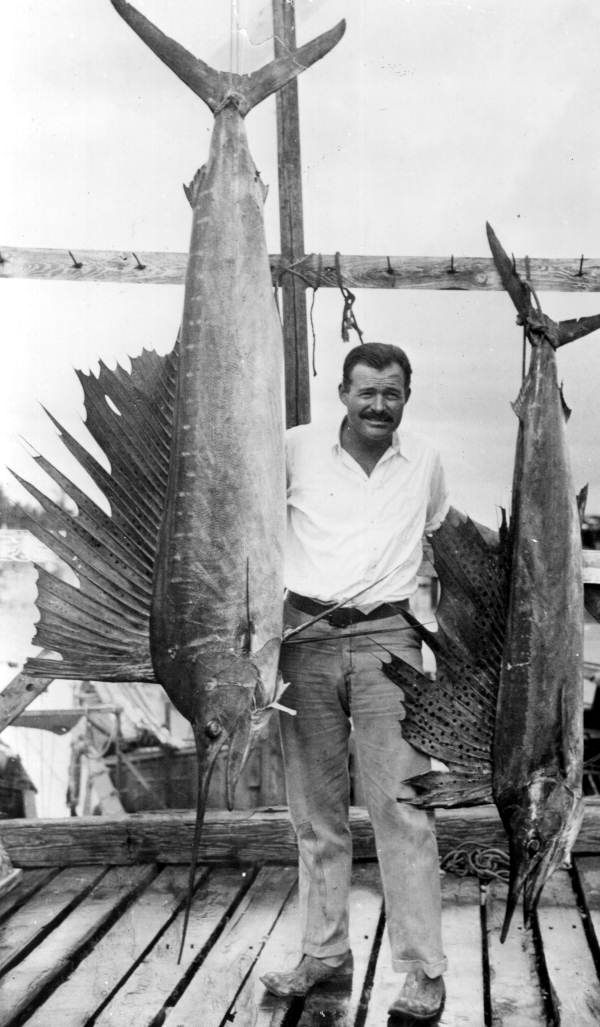
Author Ernest Hemingway in Key West, Florida, USA, in the 1940s, with a sailfish he had caught

The sailfish is one or two species of marine fish in the genus Istiophorus, which belong to the family Istiophoridae (marlins). They are predominantly blue to gray in color and have a characteristically large dorsal fin known as the sail, which often stretches the entire length of the back. Another notable characteristic is the elongated rostrum (bill) consistent with that of other marlins and the swordfish, which together constitute what are known as billfish in sport fishing circles. Sailfish live in colder pelagic waters of all Earth's oceans, and hold the record for the highest speed of any marine animal.

== Species ==
There is a dispute based on the taxonomy of the sailfish, and either one or two species have been recognized. No differences have been found in mtDNA, morphometrics or meristics between the two supposed species and most authorities now only recognize a single species, Istiophorus platypterus, found in warmer oceans around the world. FishBase continues to recognize two species:

- Atlantic sailfish (I. albicans)
- Indo-Pacific sailfish (I. platypterus)

== Description ==
Considered by many scientists the fastest fish in the ocean, sailfish were previously estimated to reach maximum swimming speeds of 35 m/s (125 km/h; 80 mph), but research published in 2015 and 2016 indicate sailfish do not exceed speeds between 10–15 m/s (35–55 km/h; 20–35 mph). During predator–prey interactions, sailfish reached burst speeds of 7 m/s (25 km/h; 15 mph) and did not surpass 10 m/s (35 km/h; 20 mph).

Sailfish grow quickly, reaching 1.2–1.5 m (4–5 ft) in length in a single year, and feed on the surface or at middle depths on smaller pelagic forage fish and squid. Generally, sailfish do not grow to more than 3 m (10 ft) in length and rarely weigh over 90 kilograms (200 pounds).

Some sources indicate that sailfish are capable of changing colors as a method of confusing prey, displaying emotion, and/or communicating with other sailfish.

Sailfish have been documented attacking humans in self-defense; a 100-pound (45-kilogram) sailfish stabbed a woman in the groin when her party tried to catch it.

== Hunting behavior ==
Sailfish have been reported to use their bills for hitting schooling fish by tapping (short-range movement) or slashing (horizontal large-range movement) at them.

The sail is normally kept folded down when swimming and only raised when the sailfish attack their prey. The raised sail has been shown to reduce sideways oscillations of the head, which is likely to make the bill less detectable by prey fish. This strategy allows sailfish to put their bills close to fish schools or even into them without being noticed by the prey before hitting them.

Sailfish usually attack one at a time, and the small teeth on their bills inflict injuries on their prey fish in terms of scale and tissue removal. Typically, about two prey fish are injured during a sailfish attack, but only 24% of attacks result in capture. As a result, injured fish increase in number over time in a fish school under attack. Given that injured fish are easier to catch, sailfish benefit from the attacks of their conspecifics but only up to a particular group size. A mathematical model showed that sailfish in groups of up to 70 individuals should gain benefits in this way. The underlying mechanism was termed proto-cooperation because it does not require any spatial coordination of attacks and could be a precursor to more complex forms of group hunting.

The bill movement of sailfish during attacks on fish is usually either to the left or to the right side. Identification of individual sailfish based on the shape of their dorsal fins identified individual preferences for hitting to the right or left side. The strength of this side preference was positively correlated with capture success. These side-preferences are believed to be a form of behavioral specialization that improves performance. However, a possibility exists that sailfish with strong side preferences could become predictable to their prey because fish could learn after repeated interactions in which direction the predator will hit. Given that individuals with right- and left-sided preferences are about equally frequent in sailfish populations, living in groups possibly offers a way out of this predictability. The larger the sailfish group, the greater the possibility that individuals with right- and left-sided preferences are about equally frequent. Therefore, prey fish should find it hard to predict in which direction the next attack will take place. Taken together, these results suggest a potential novel benefit of group hunting which allows individual predators to specialize in their hunting strategy without becoming predictable to their prey.

The injuries that sailfish inflict on their prey appear to reduce their swimming speeds, with injured fish being more frequently found in the back (compared with the front) of the school than uninjured ones. When a sardine school is approached by a sailfish, the sardines usually turn away and flee in the opposite direction. As a result, the sailfish usually attacks sardine schools from behind, putting at risk those fish that are the rear of the school because of their reduced swimming speeds.

== Habitat ==
The sailfish is an epipelagic and oceanic species and shows a strong tendency to approach continental coasts, islands and reefs in tropical and temperate waters of the Pacific and Indian oceans.

Sailfish in some areas are reliant on coral reefs as areas for feeding and breeding. As witnessed in the Persian Gulf, the disappearance of coral reefs in a sailfish's habitat may be followed by the disappearance of the species from that area.

== Predators ==
When freshly hatched, sailfish are hunted by other fishes that mainly survive on eating plankton. The size of their predators increases as they grow, and adult sailfish are not eaten by anything other than larger predatory fish like open ocean shark species and orcas.
