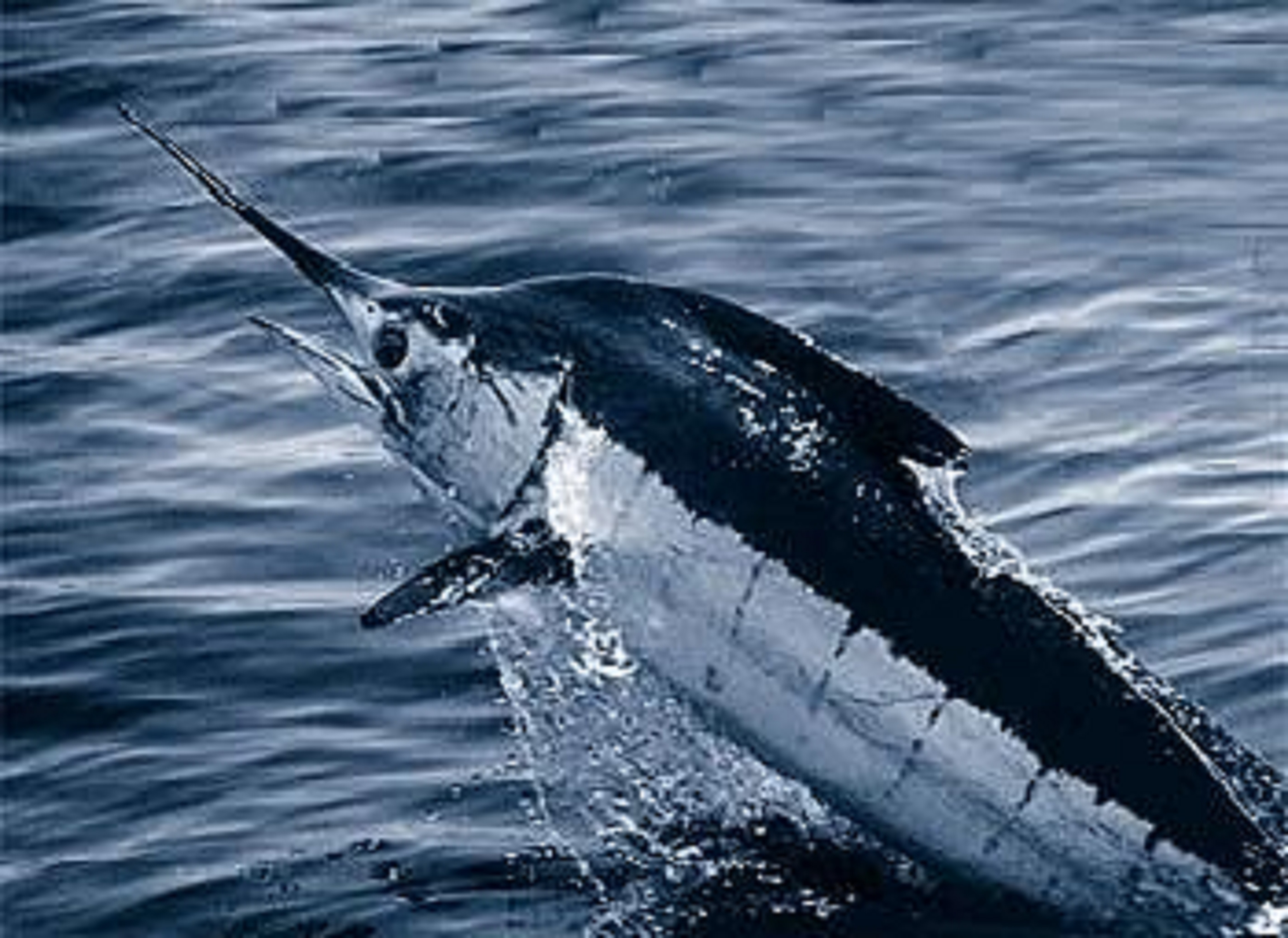
- The largest billfish, the Atlantic blue marlin weighs up to 820 kg (1800 lb) and has been classified as a vulnerable species.

Scientific classification
- Kingdom: Animalia
- Phylum: Chordata
- Class: Actinopterygii
- Division: Teleostei
- Order: Carangiformes
- Suborder: Menoidei
- Superfamily: Xiphioidea; Rafinesque, 1810

Families
- Xiphiidae; Istiophoridae; †Hemingwayidae; †Palaeorhynchidae; †Blochiidae; †Xiphiorhynchidae

= Billfish =

Billfish Temporal range: Late Paleocene–present

Group of ray-finned fishes

The billfish are saltwater predatory ray-finned fish from the superfamily Xiphioidea, characterised by prominent pointed bills (rostra), and by their large size; some are longer than 4 m (13 ft). Extant billfish include sailfish and marlin, which make up the family Istiophoridae; and swordfish, sole member of the family Xiphiidae. They are often apex predators which feed on a wide variety of smaller fish, crustaceans and cephalopods.

Billfish are pelagic and highly migratory, and are found in all oceans. Although they usually inhabit tropical and subtropical waters, swordfish are also found in temperate waters. Billfish use their long spear/sword-like upper beaks to slash at and stun prey during feeding. Their bills have been known to impale prey, and have sometimes even accidentally impaled boats and people, but they are not intentionally used for this purpose. They are highly valued as game fish by sports fishermen.

== Taxonomy ==
These two families were previously classified as belonging to the order Istiophoriformes. Other classifications treated them as being closely related to the mackerels and tuna within the suborder Scombroidei of the order Perciformes. However, the 5th edition of the Fishes of the World does recognise the Istiophoriformes as a valid order, albeit including the Sphyraenidae, the barracudas. Most recently, comprehensive phylogenetic analyses have found the billfish to be deeply nested within an expanded treatment of Carangiformes as the sister group to the moonfishes (family Menidae). For this reason, Eschmeyer's Catalog of Fishes now places both families of billfish within the suborder Menoidei of the Carangiformes.

=== Evolution ===
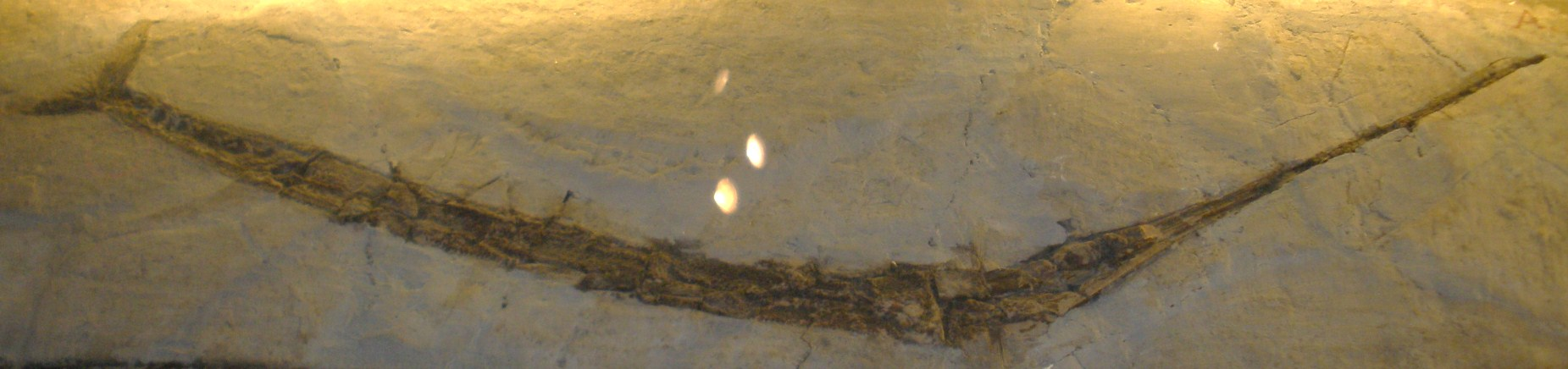
Blochius, a small Eocene billfish

Several extinct families of billfish are known from the early Paleogene, including the Blochiidae, Xiphiorhynchidae, Palaeorhynchidae, and Hemingwayidae; all of these already have the elongated rostrum present in modern billfish. The earliest fossil billfishes are a Blochius-like fish from Peru and Hemingwaya from Turkmenistan, both of which are known from the Late Paleocene or earliest Eocene. Some studies suggest that Palaeorhynchidae and Hemingwayidae are stem-group billfish, while Blochiidae and Xiphiorhynchidae are crown group-billfish related to the Xiphiidae and Istiophoridae respectively. Most of these early billfish were small in size, but members of the Xiphiorhynchidae could grow to very large sizes, suggesting that billfish had already evolved large body sizes early in their evolutionary history.

Some studies have found the divergence between the Xiphiidae and Istiophoridae to date to the Late Cretaceous, while more recent studies have dated it to the early Paleocene. This ancient divergence is based on the early remains of apparent crown-group billfish such as the blochiids and xiphiorhynchids.

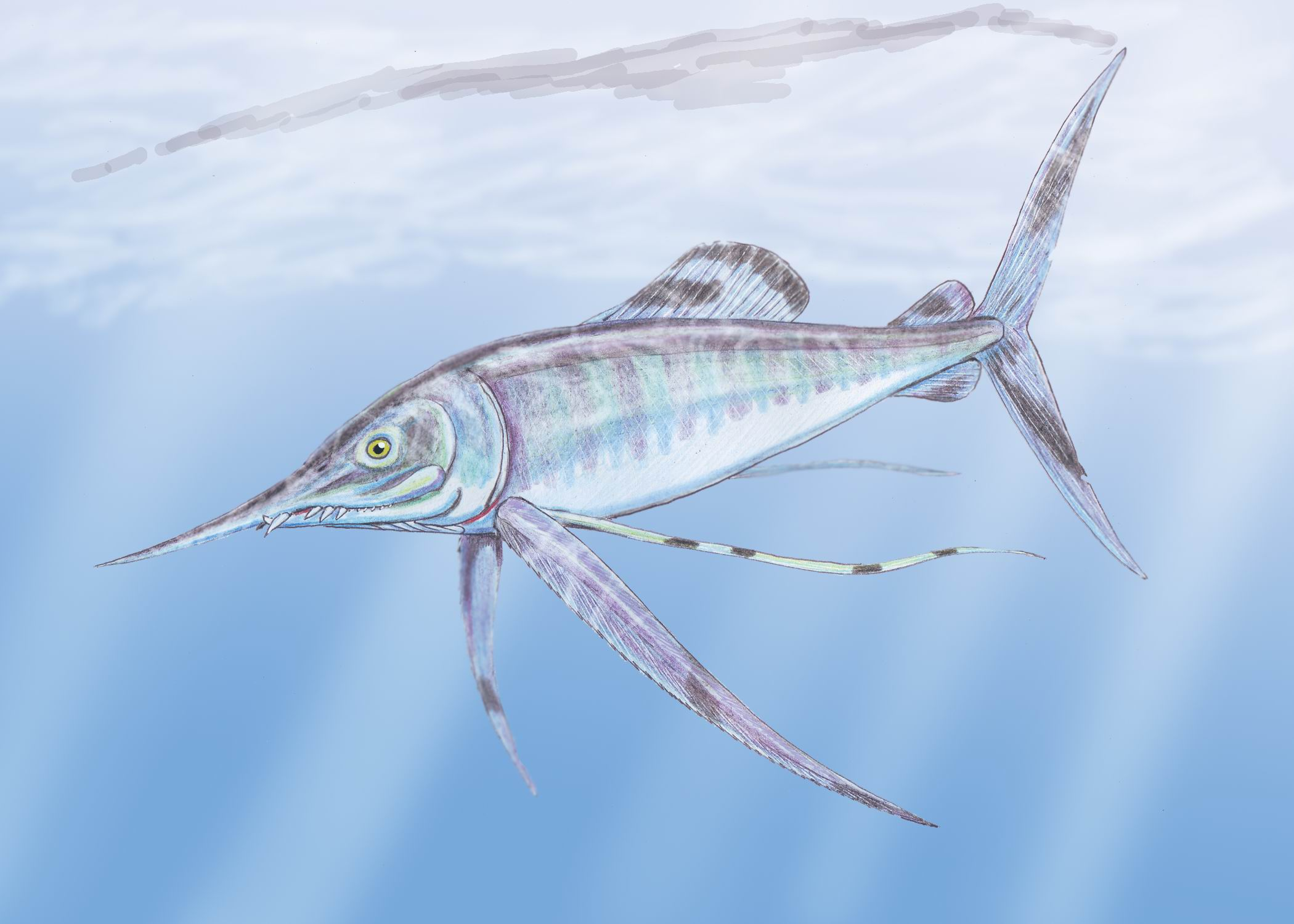

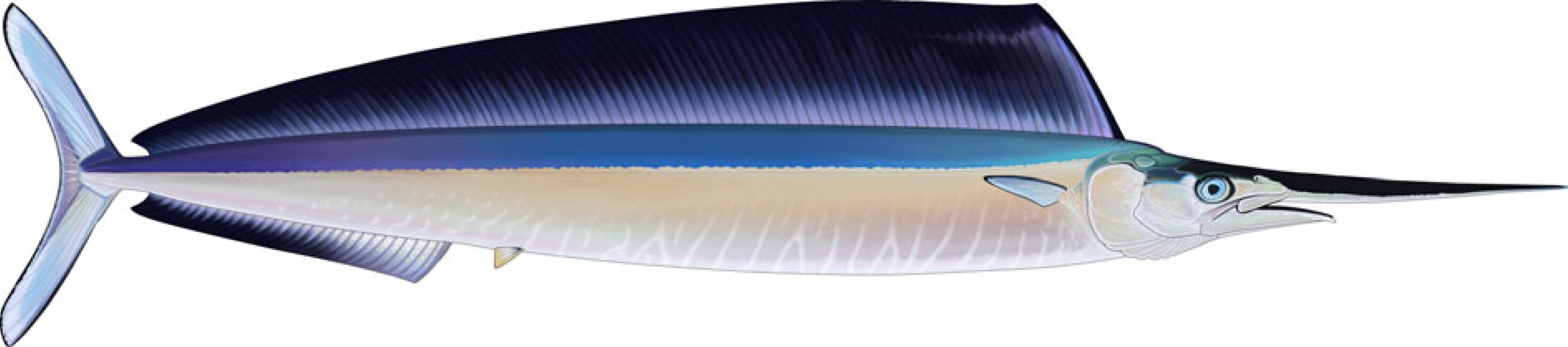
"False billfish" from the Cretaceous: Protosphyraena (top) and Rhamphoichthys (below).

The enigmatic Cylindracanthus, known from the Late Cretaceous to the Eocene, is sometimes considered a "billfish" related to blochiids on the basis of its presumed rostral spines, but no other fossils are known of it aside from its rostral spines, leading to the suggestion that it had a cartilaginous body and may even be a relative of sturgeons. Similarly, the pachycormid fish Protosphyraena and the plethodid fish Rhamphoichthys from the Late Cretaceous had both convergently evolved a highly billfish-like body plan, but are known to be very distantly related to actual billfish; these genera may have instead served as a Cretaceous ecological analogue to billfish.

== Species ==
The term billfish refers to the fishes of the families Xiphiidae and Istiophoridae. These large fishes are "characterized by the prolongation of the upper jaw, much beyond the lower jaw into a long rostrum which is flat and sword-like (swordfish) or rounded and spear-like (sailfishes, spearfishes, and marlins)."

=== True billfish ===
The 12 species of true billfish are divided into two families and five genera. One family, Xiphiidae, contains only one species, the swordfish Xiphias gladius, and the other family, Istiophoridae, contains 11 species in four genera, including marlin, spearfish, and sailfish. Controversy exists about whether the Indo-Pacific blue marlin, Makaira mazara, is the same species as the Atlantic blue marlin, M. nigricans. FishBase follows Nakamura (1985) in recognizing M. mazara as a distinct species, "chiefly because of differences in the pattern of the lateral line system".

Billfish species
| Family | Genus | Common name | Scientific name | Maximum length | Common length | Maximum weight | Maximum age | Trophic level | FishBase | FAO | IUCN status |
|---|---|---|---|---|---|---|---|---|---|---|---|
| Xiphiidae | Xiphias | Swordfish | Xiphias gladius (Linnaeus, 1758) | 455 cm | 300 cm | 650 kg | years | 4.49 | | | Near threatened |
| Istiophoridae | Istiophorus; Sailfish | Atlantic sailfish | Istiophorus albicans (Latreille, 1804) | 315 cm | cm | 58.1 kg | 17 years | 4.50 | | | Not assessed |
| Istiophoridae | Istiophorus; Sailfish | Indo-Pacific sailfish | Istiophorus platypterus (Shaw, 1792) | 340 cm | cm | 100 kg | years | 4.50 | | | Vulnerable |
| Istiophoridae | Istiompax | Black marlin | Istiompax indica (Cuvier, 1832) | 465 cm | 380 cm | 750 kg | years | 4.50 | | | Data deficient |
| Istiophoridae | Makaira | Indo-Pacific blue marlin | Makaira mazara (Jordan and Snyder, 1901) | 500 cm | 350 cm | 625 kg | 4.5 – 6 years | 4.46 | | | Not assessed |
| Istiophoridae | Makaira | Atlantic blue marlin | Makaira nigricans (Lacépède, 1802) | 500 cm | 290 cm | 820 kg | years | 4.50 | | | Vulnerable |
| Istiophoridae | Kajikia | White marlin | Kajikia albida Poey, 1860 | 300 cm | 210 cm | 82.5 kg | years | 4.48 | | | Least concern |
| Istiophoridae | Kajikia | Striped marlin | Kajikia audax (Philippi, 1887) | 350 cm | cm | 200 kg | years | 4.58 | | | Least concern |
| Istiophoridae | Tetrapturus | Shortbill spearfish | Tetrapturus angustirostris Tanaka, 1915 | 200 cm | cm | 52 kg | years | 4.50 | | | Data deficient |
| Istiophoridae | Tetrapturus | Roundscale spearfish | Tetrapturus georgii Lowe, 1841 | 184 cm | cm | 24 kg | years | 4.37 | | | Data deficient |
| Istiophoridae | Tetrapturus | Mediterranean spearfish | Tetrapturus belone Rafinesque, 1810 | 240 cm | 200 cm | 70 kg | years | 4.50 | | | Least concern |
| Istiophoridae | Tetrapturus | Longbill spearfish | Tetrapturus pfluegeri Robins and de Sylva, 1963 | 254 cm | 165 cm | 58 kg | years | 4.28 | | | Least concern |

True billfish
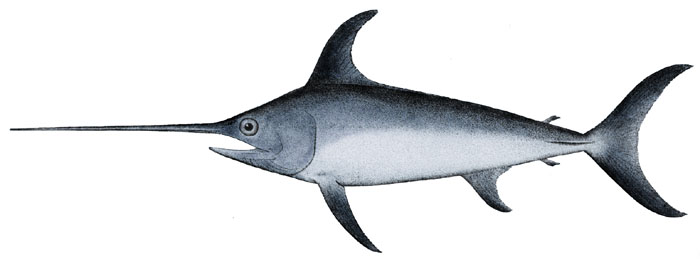
Swordfish, most commercially fished billfish

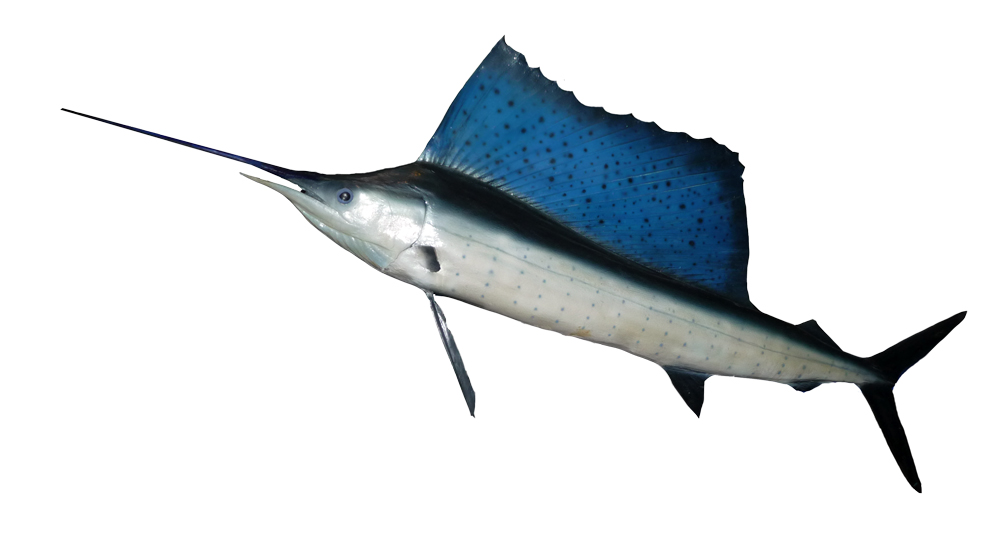
The Indo-Pacific sailfish, fastest of all fishes

=== Billfish-like fish ===
A number of other fishes have pronounced bills or beaks, and are sometimes referred to as billfish, despite not being true billfish. Halfbeaks look somewhat like miniature billfish, and the sawfish and sawshark, which are cartilaginous fishes with long, serrated rostrums. Needlefish are sometimes confused with billfish, but they are "easily distinguished from the true billfish by having both jaws prolonged, the dorsal and anal fins both single and similar in size and shape, and the pelvic fins inserted far behind the pectorals." Paddlefish have elongated rostrums containing electroreceptors that can detect weak electrical fields. Paddlefish are filter feeders and may use their rostrum to detect zooplankton.

== Structure and function of the bill ==
Billfish have a long, bony, spear-shaped bill, sometimes called a snout, beak or rostrum. The swordfish has the longest bill, about one-third its body length. Like a true sword, it is smooth, flat, pointed and sharp. The bills of other billfish are shorter and rounder, more like spears.

Billfish normally use their bills to slash at schooling fish. They swim through the fish school at high speed, slashing left and right, and then circle back to eat the fish they stunned. Adult swordfish have no teeth, and other billfish have only small file-like teeth. They swallow their catch whole, head-first. Billfish do not normally spear with their bills, though occasionally a marlin will flip a fish into the air and bayonet it. Given the speed and power of these fish, when they do spear things the results can be dramatic. Predators of billfish, such as great white and mako sharks, have been found with billfish spears embedded in them. Pelagic fish generally are fascinated by floating objects, and congregate about them. Billfish can accidentally impale boats and other floating objects when they pursue the small fish that aggregate around them. Care is needed when attempting to land a hooked billfish. Many fisherman have been injured, some seriously, by a billfish thrashing its bill about.

== Other characteristics ==
External videos
- Striped Marlin Bait Ball YouTube

Billfish are large swift predators which spend most of their time in the epipelagic zone of the open ocean. They feed voraciously on smaller pelagic fish, crustaceans and small squid. Some billfish species also hunt demersal fish on the seafloor, while others descend periodically to mesopelagic depths. They may come closer to the coast when they spawn in the summer. Their eggs and larvae are pelagic, that is they float freely in the water column. Many grow over three metres (10 feet) long, and the blue marlin can grow to five metres (16 feet). Females are usually larger than males.

Like scombroids (tuna, bonito and mackerel), billfish have both the ability to migrate over long distances, efficiently cruising at slow speeds, and the ability to generate rapid bursts of speed. These speed bursts can be quite astonishing, and the Indo-Pacific sailfish has been recorded making a burst of 68 miles per hour (110 km/h), nearly top speed for a cheetah and the highest speed ever recorded for a fish.

Some billfish also descend to considerable mesopelagic depths. They have sophisticated swim bladders which allow them to rapidly compensate for pressure changes as the depth changes. This means that when they are swimming deep, they can return swiftly to the surface without problems. "Like the large tuna, some billfish maintain their body temperature several degrees above ambient water temperatures; this elevated body temperature increases the efficiency of the swimming muscles, especially during excursions into the cold water below the thermocline." See heater cells for more information about these specialized modified muscle cells.

In 1936 the British zoologist James Gray posed a conundrum which has come to be known as Gray's paradox. The problem he posed was how dolphins can swim and accelerate so fast when it seemed their muscles lacked the needed power. If this is a problem with dolphins it is an even greater problem with billfish such as swordfish, which swim and accelerate faster than dolphins. In 2009, Taiwanese researchers from the National Chung Hsing University introduced new concepts of "kidnapped airfoils and circulating horsepower" to explain the swimming capabilities of swordfish. The researchers claim this analysis also "solves the perplexity of dolphin's Gray paradox". They also assert that swordfish "use sensitive rostrum/lateral-line sensors to detect upcoming/ambient water pressure and attain the best attack angle to capture the body lift power aided by the forward-biased dorsal fin to compensate for most of the water resistance power."

Billfish have prominent dorsal fins. Like tuna, mackerel and other scombroids, billfish streamline themselves by retracting their dorsal fins into a groove in their body when they swim. The shape, size, position and colour of the dorsal fin varies with the type of billfish, and can be a simple way to identify a billfish species. For example, the white marlin has a dorsal fin with a curved front edge and is covered with black spots. The huge dorsal fin, or sail of the sailfish is kept retracted most of the time. Sailfish raise them if they want to herd a school of small fish, and also after periods of high activity, presumably to cool down.

== Distribution and migration ==
Billfish occur worldwide in temperate and tropical waters. They are highly migratory oceanic fish, spending much of their time in the epipelagic zone of international water following major ocean currents. Migrations are linked to seasonal patterns of sea surface temperatures. They are sometimes referred to as "rare event species" because the areas they roam over in the open seas are so large that researchers have difficulty locating them. Little is known about their movements and life histories, so assessing how they can be sustainably managed is not easy.

Unlike coastal fish, billfish usually avoid inshore waters unless there is a deep dropoff close to the land. Instead, they swim along the edge of the continental shelf where cold nutrient rich upwellings can fuel large schools of forage fish. Billfish can be found here, cruising and feeding "above the craggy bottom like hawks soaring along a ridge line".

== Commercial fishing ==
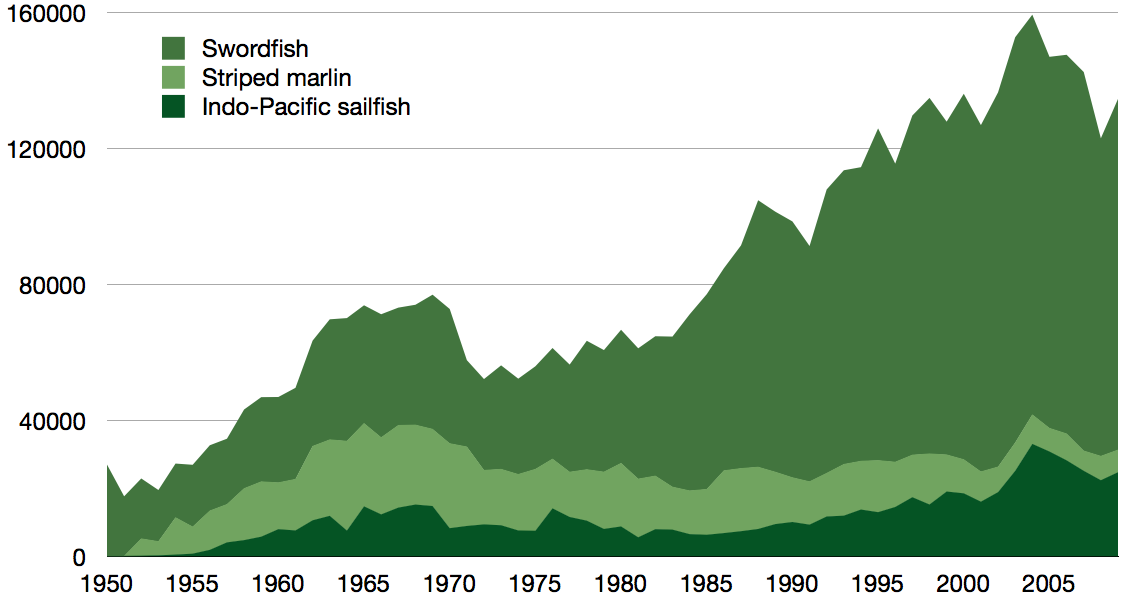
Global commercial capture of billfish reported by the FAO in tonnes 1950–2009

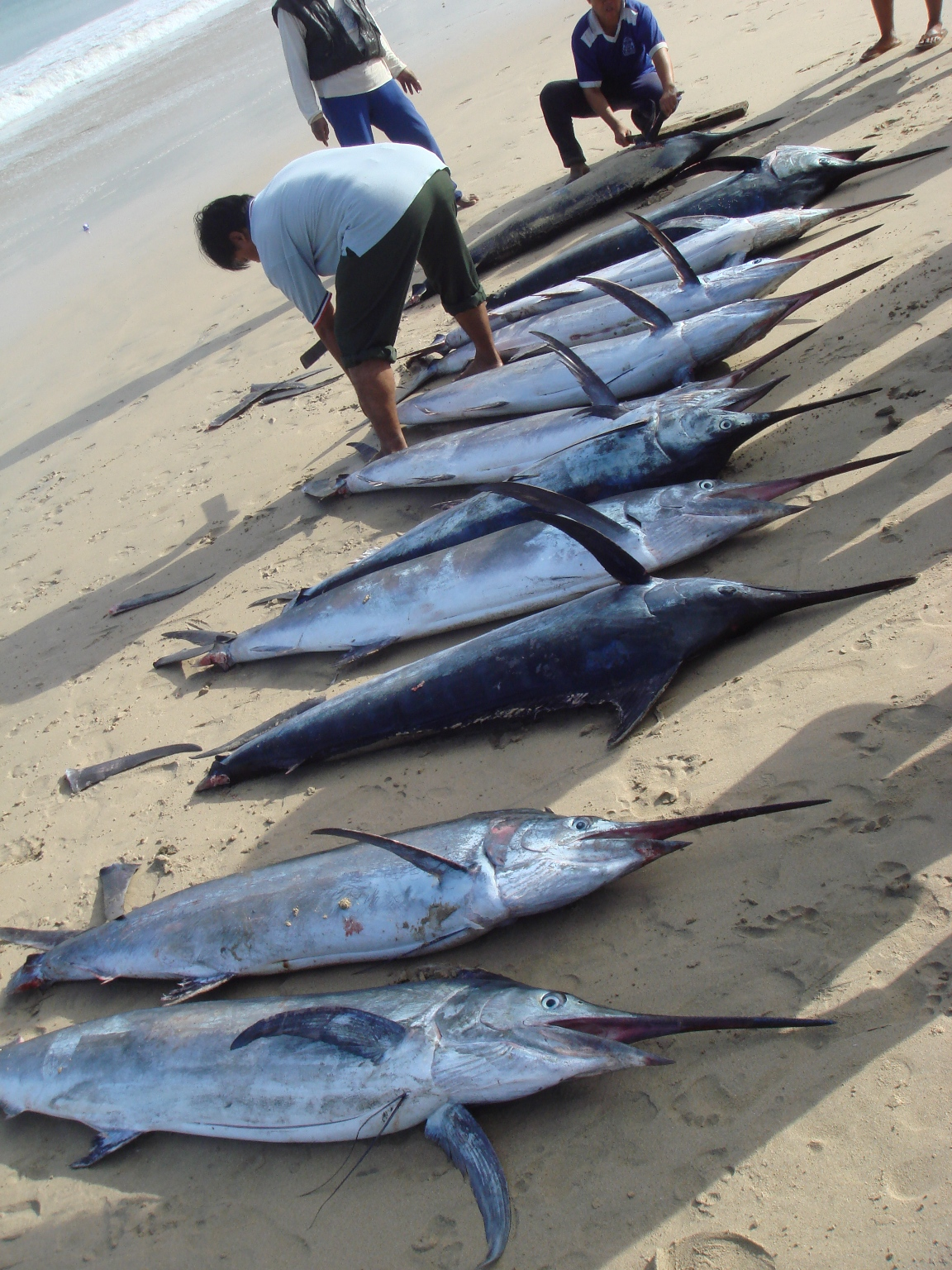
Commercial catch of marlin at Jimbaran, Indonesia

In parts of the Pacific and Indian Ocean such as the Maldives, billfishing, particularly for swordfish, is an important component of subsistence fishing.

== Recreational fishing ==
Over the years, billfish tournaments have transformed into big business enterprises. Many prestigious tournaments now have enormous calcuttas and purses as well as large numbers of participating anglers. With huge purses and egos on the line, concern often arises whether all participants are adhering to the letter of the rules.
– IGFA Conservation Director, Jason Schratwieser

Billfish are among the most coveted of big gamefish, and major recreational fisheries cater to the demand. In North America, "the apex of the salt water pursuits is billfishing, the quest for elusive blue marlin and sailfish in the deep blue water about 60 miles out." A lot of resources are committed to the activity, particularly in the construction of private and charter billfishing boats to participate in the billfishing tournament circuit. These are expensive purpose-built offshore vessels with powerfully driven deep sea hulls. They are often built to luxury standards and equipped with many technologies to ease the life of the deep sea recreational fisherman, including outriggers, flying bridges and fighting chairs, and state of the art fishfinders and navigation electronics.

The boats cruise along the edge of the continental shelf where billfish can be found down to 200 metres (600 ft), sometimes near weed lines at the surface and submarine canyons and ridges deeper down. Commercial fishermen usually use drift nets or longlines to catch billfish, but recreational fishermen usually drift with bait fish or troll a bait or lure. Billfish are caught deeper down the water column by drifting with live bait fish such as ballyhoo, striped mullet or bonito. Alternatively, they can be caught by trolling at the surface with dead bait or trolling lures designed to imitate bait fish.

Most recreational fishermen now tag and release billfish. A 2003 study surveyed 317,000 billfish known to have been tagged and released since 1954. Of these, 4122 were recovered. The study concluded that, while tag and release programs have limitations, they provided important information about billfish that cannot currently be obtained by other methods.

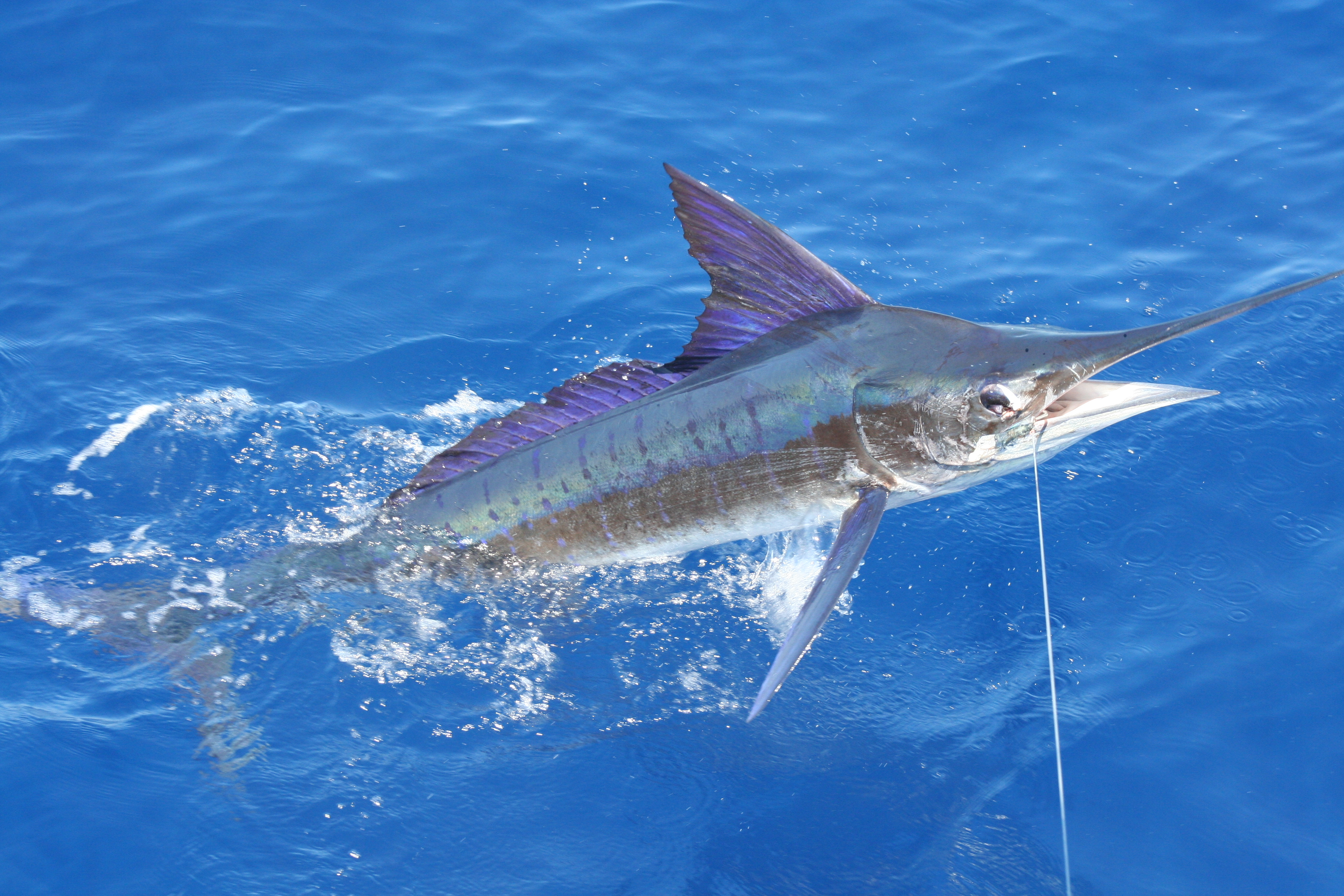
Hooked striped marlin

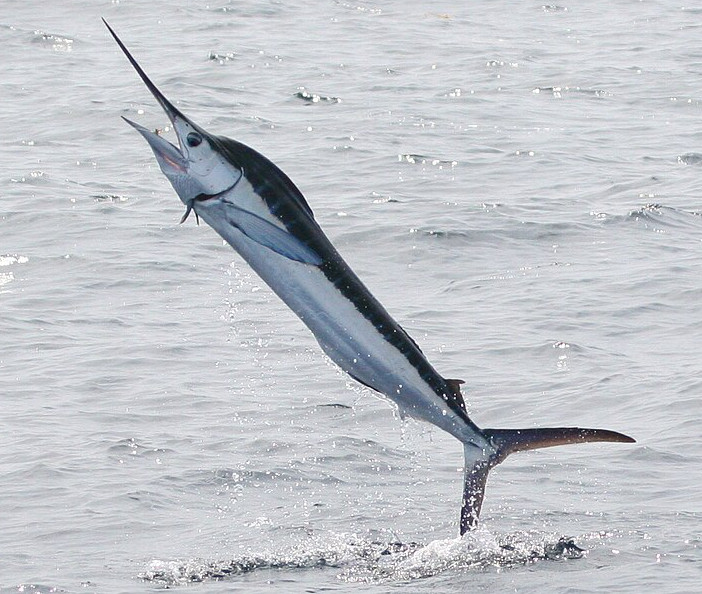
Hooked billfish can leap spectacularly out of the water

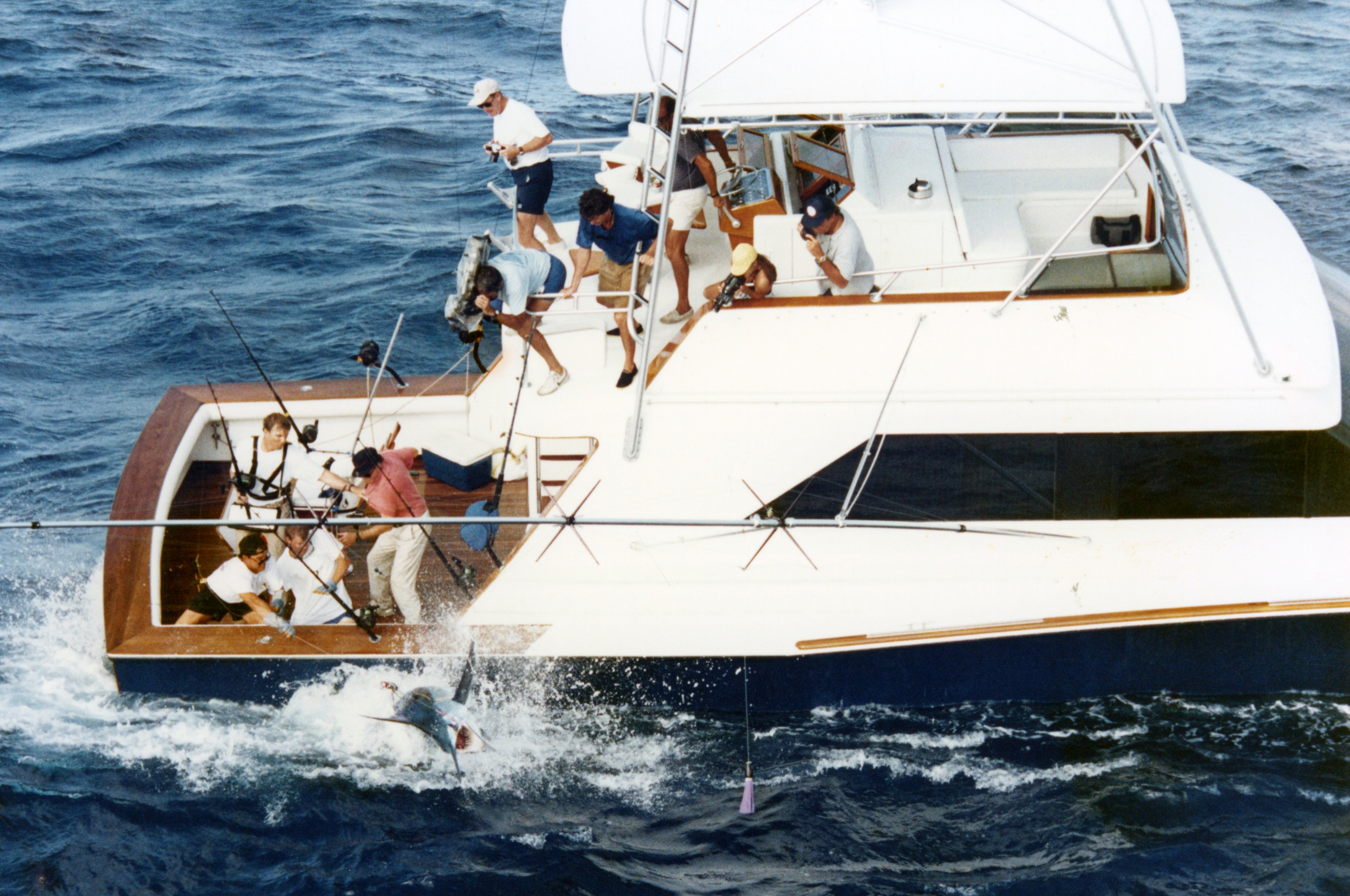

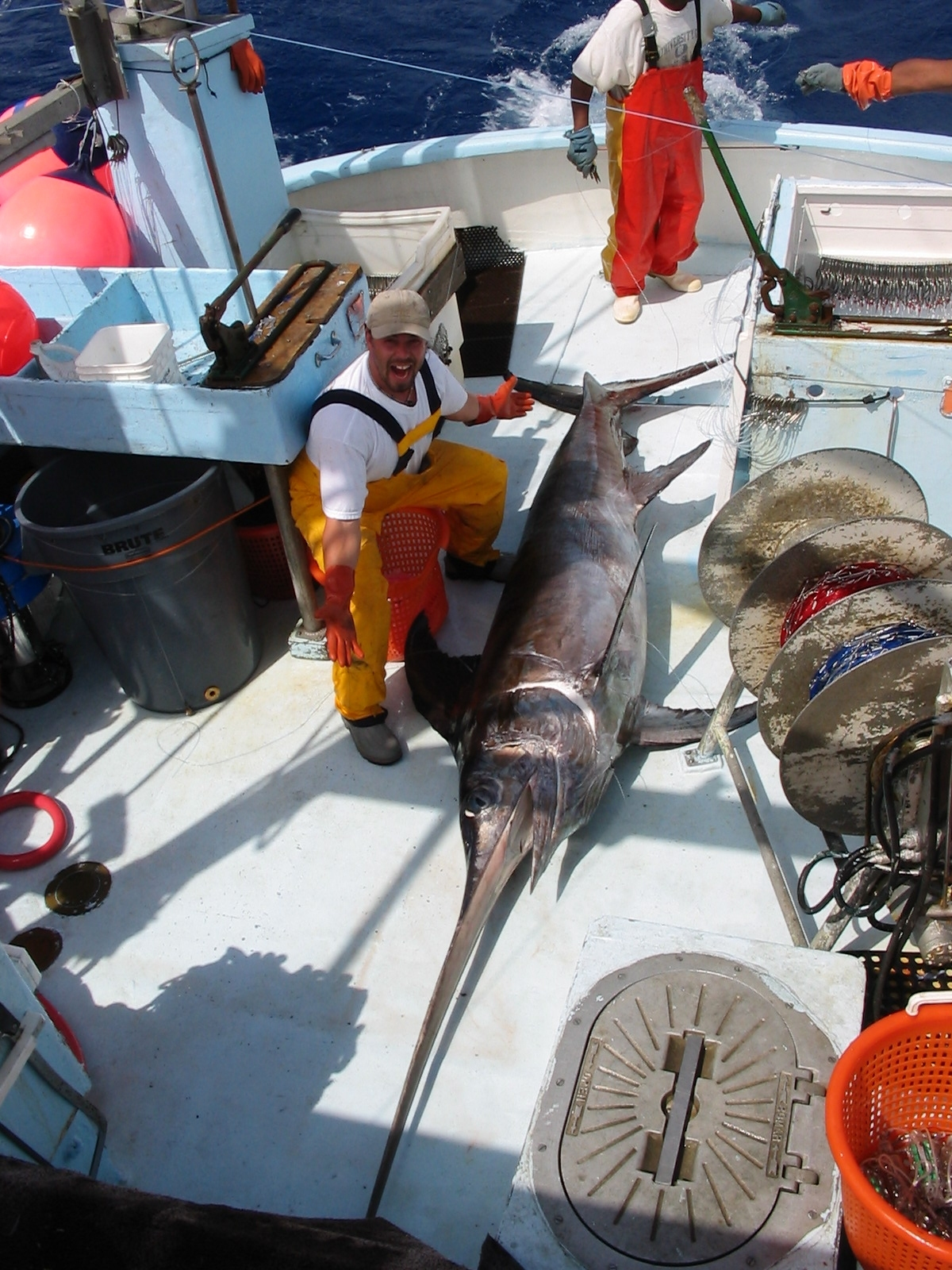

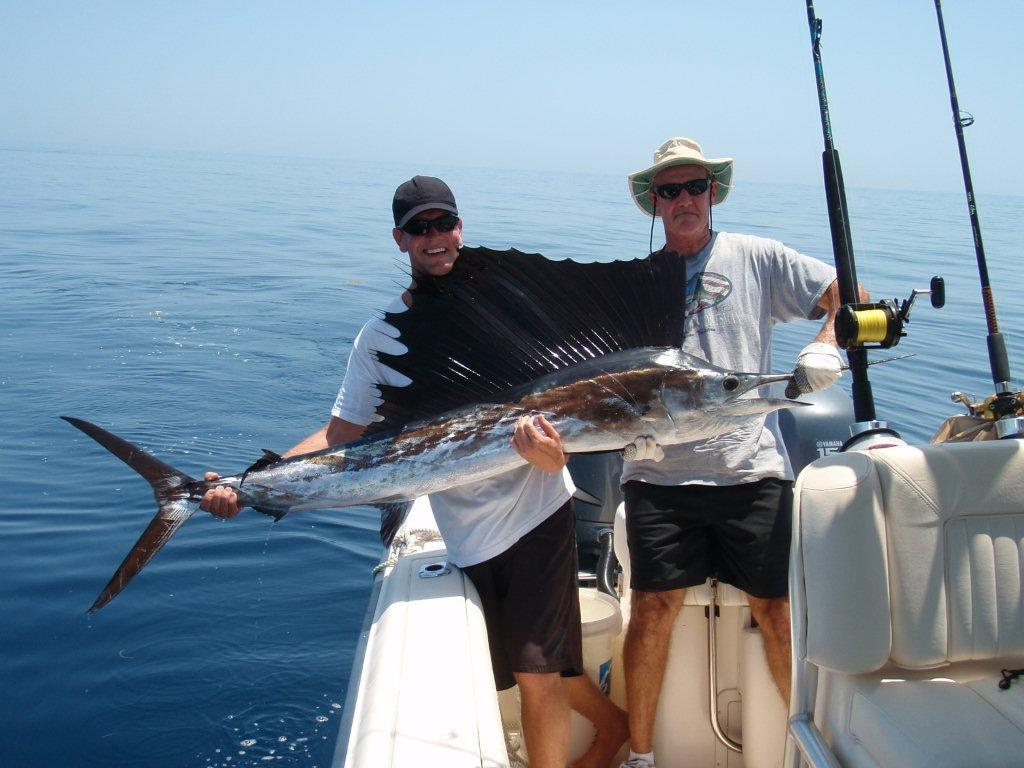

== As food ==
Billfish make good eating fish, and are high in omega-3 oils. Blue marlin has a particularly high oil content.

Raw swordfish
Nutritional value per 100 g (3.5 oz)
- Energy: 144 kJ (34 kcal)
- Fat: 6.65 g
- Protein: 19.66 g
Vitamins and minerals
| Vitamins | Quantity %DV^{†} |
| Vitamin A | 120 IU |
| Vitamin D | 70% 558 IU |
| Minerals | Quantity %DV^{†} |
| Calcium | 0% 5 mg |
| Iron | 2% 0.38 mg |
| Magnesium | 7% 29 mg |
| Phosphorus | 20% 255 mg |
| Potassium | 14% 418 mg |
| Sodium | 4% 81 mg |
| Zinc | 6% 0.66 mg |
- Other constituents: Quantity
- Water: 73.38 g
- ^{†}Percentages estimated using US recommendations for adults, except for potassium, which is estimated based on expert recommendation from the National Academies.

Billfish are primarily marketed in Japan, where they are eaten raw as sashimi. They are marketed fresh, frozen, canned, cooked and smoked. It is not usually a good idea to fry billfish. Swordfish and marlin are best grilled or broiled, or eaten raw as in sashimi. Sailfish and spearfish are somewhat tough and are better cooked over charcoal or smoked.

Billfish as food
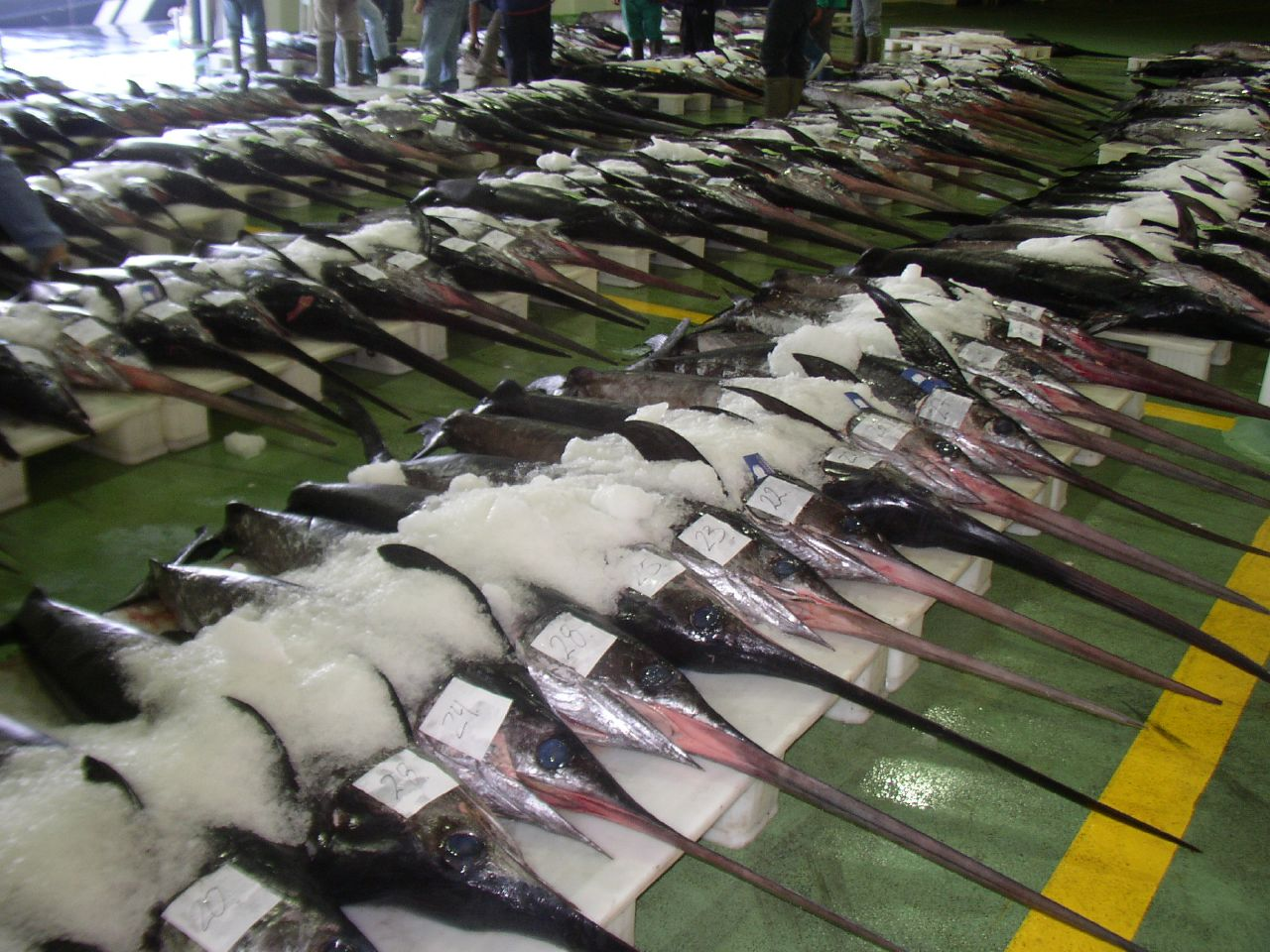
Swordfish auction in the fish market of Vigo

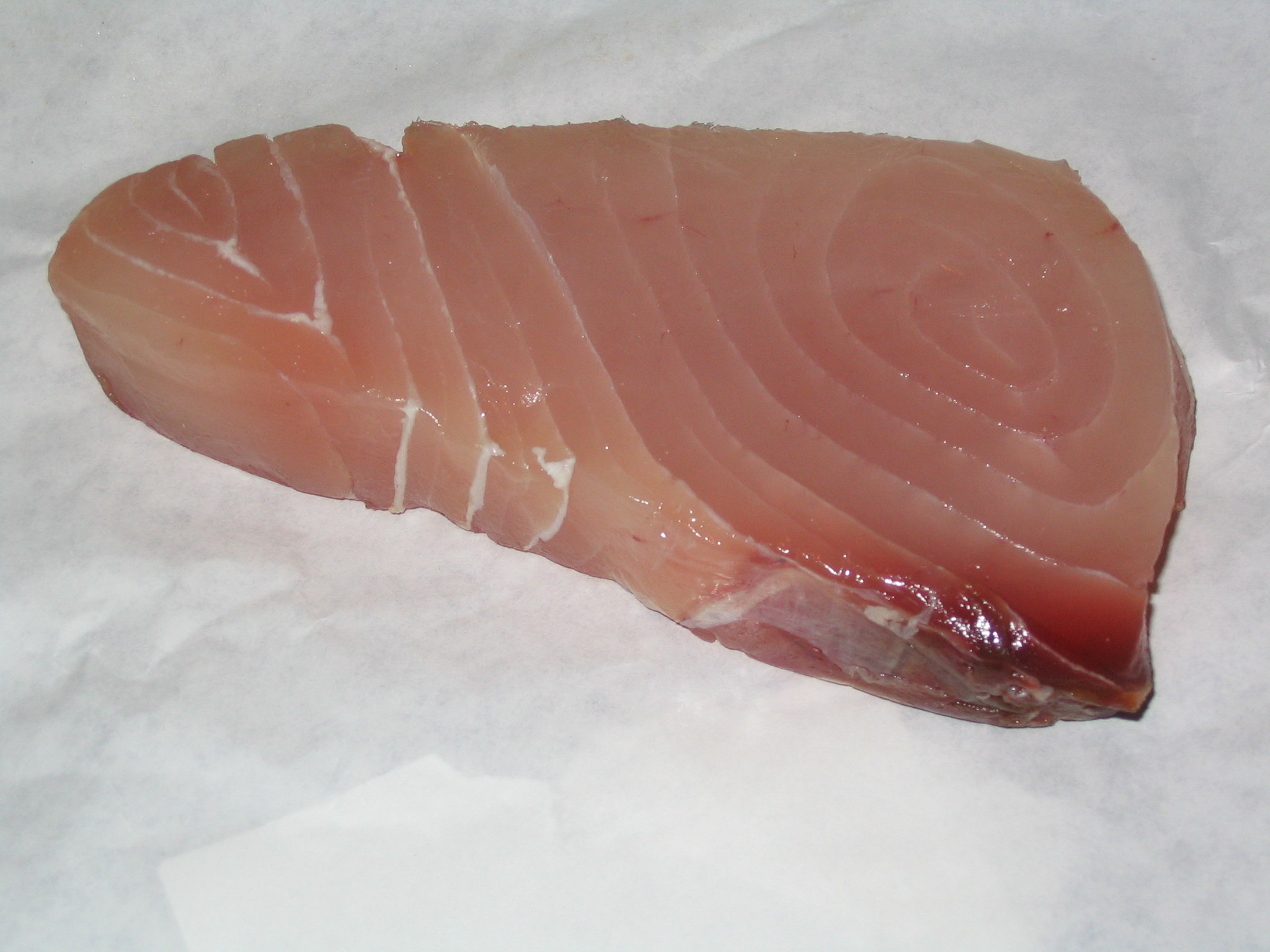
Slice of Atlantic blue marlin

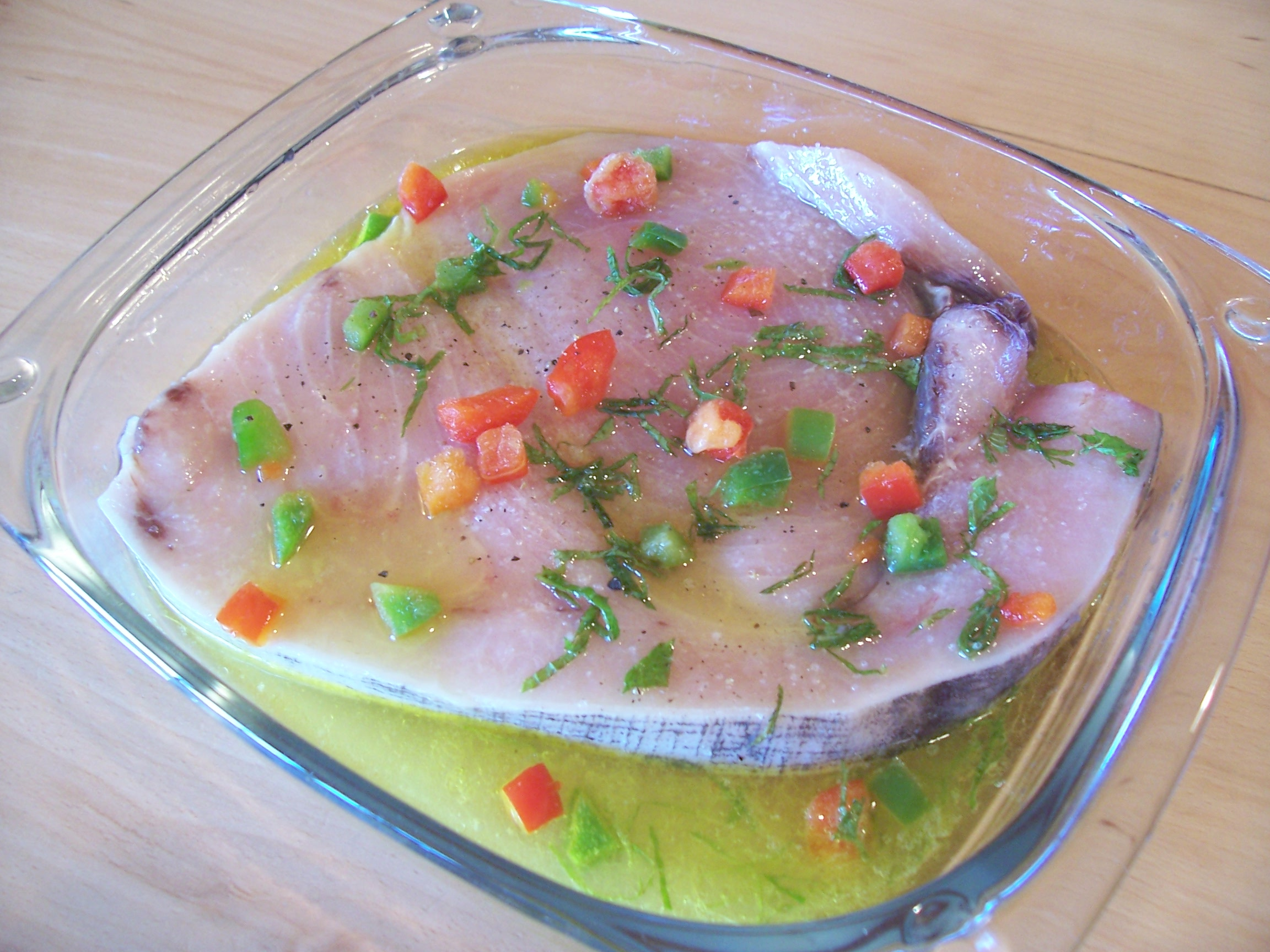
Swordfish marinade

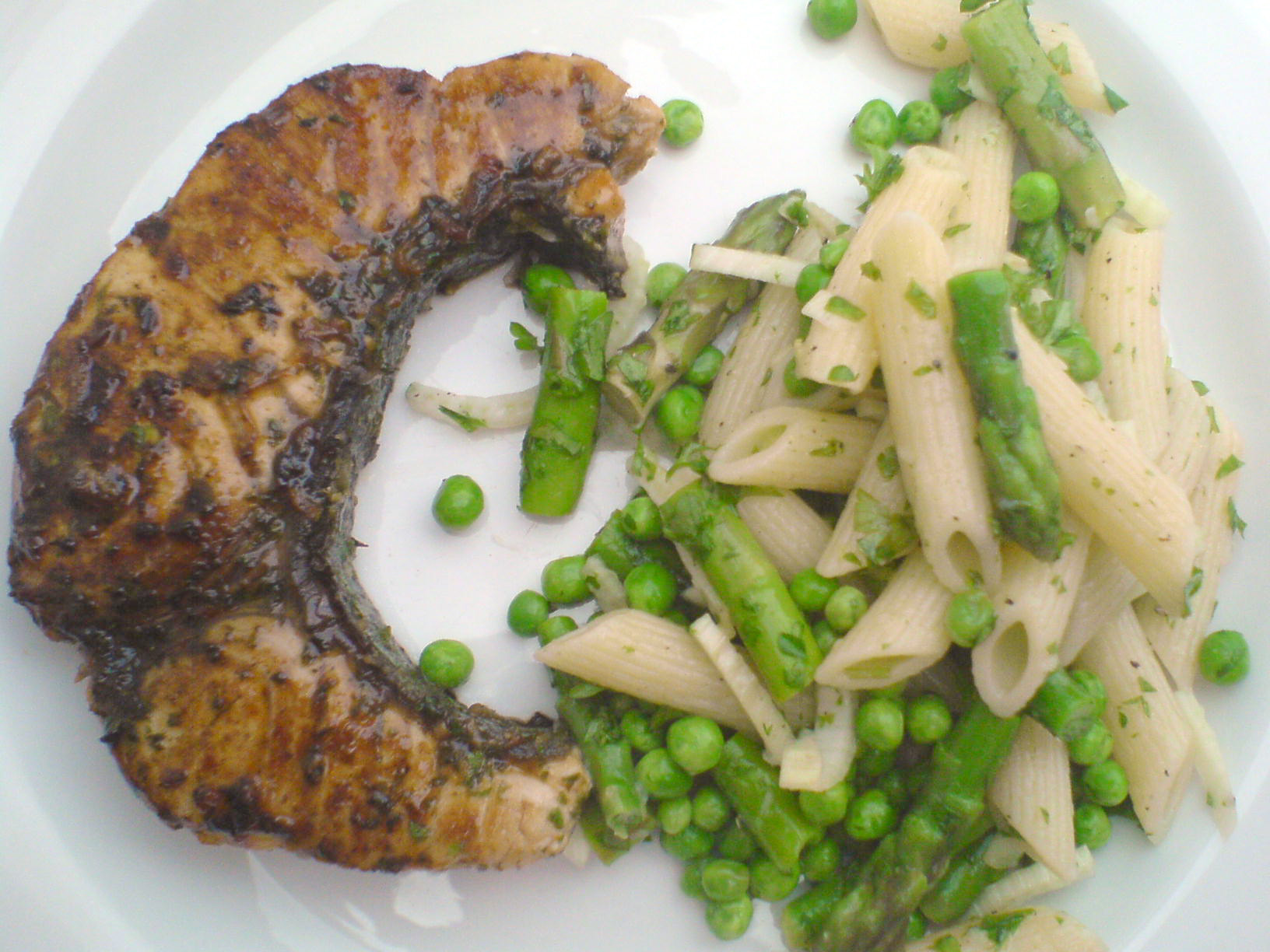
Fried sailfish with noodle salad

=== Mercury ===
However, because billfish have high trophic levels, near the top of the food web, they also contain significant levels of mercury and other toxins. According to the United States Food and Drug Administration, swordfish is one of four fishes, along with tilefish, shark, and king mackerel, that children and pregnant women should avoid due to high levels of methylmercury found in these fish and the consequent risk of mercury poisoning.

== Conservation ==
Billfish are exploited both as food and as fish. Marlin and sailfish are eaten in many parts of the world, and many sport fisheries target these species. Swordfish are subject to particularly intense fisheries pressures, and although their survival is not threatened worldwide, they are now comparatively rare in many places where once they were abundant. The istiophorid billfishes (marlin and spearfish) also suffer from intense fishing pressures. High mortality levels occur when they are caught incidentally by longline fisheries targeting other fish. Overfishing continues to "push these declines further in some species". Because of these concerns about declining populations, sport fishermen and conservationists now work together to gather information on billfish stocks and implement programs such as catch and release, where fish are returned to the sea after they have been caught. However, the process of catching them can leave them too traumatised to recover. Studies have shown that circle fishing hooks do much less damage to billfish than the traditional J-hooks, yet they are at just as effective for catching billfish. This is good for conservation, since it improves survival rates after release.

The stocks for individual species in billfish longline fisheries can "boom and bust" in linked and compensatory ways. For example, the Atlantic catch of blue marlin declined in the 1960s. This was accompanied by an increase in sailfish catch. The sailfish catch then declined from the end of the 1970s to the end of the 1980s, compensated by an increase in swordfish catch. As a result, overall billfish catches remained fairly stable.

"Many of the world's fisheries operate in a data poor environment that precludes predictions about how different management actions will affect individual species and the ecosystem as a whole." In recently years pop-up satellite archival tags have been used to monitor billfish. The capability of these tags to recover useful data is improving, and their use should result in more accurate stock assessments. In 2011, a group of researchers claimed they have, for the first time, standardized all available data about scombrids and billfishes so it is in a form suitable for assessing threats to these species. The synthesis shows that those species which combine a long life with a high economic value, such as the Atlantic blue marlin and the white marlin, are generally threatened. The combination puts such species in "double jeopardy".

== See also ==
- Billfish in the Indian Ocean
- The Old Man and the Sea
