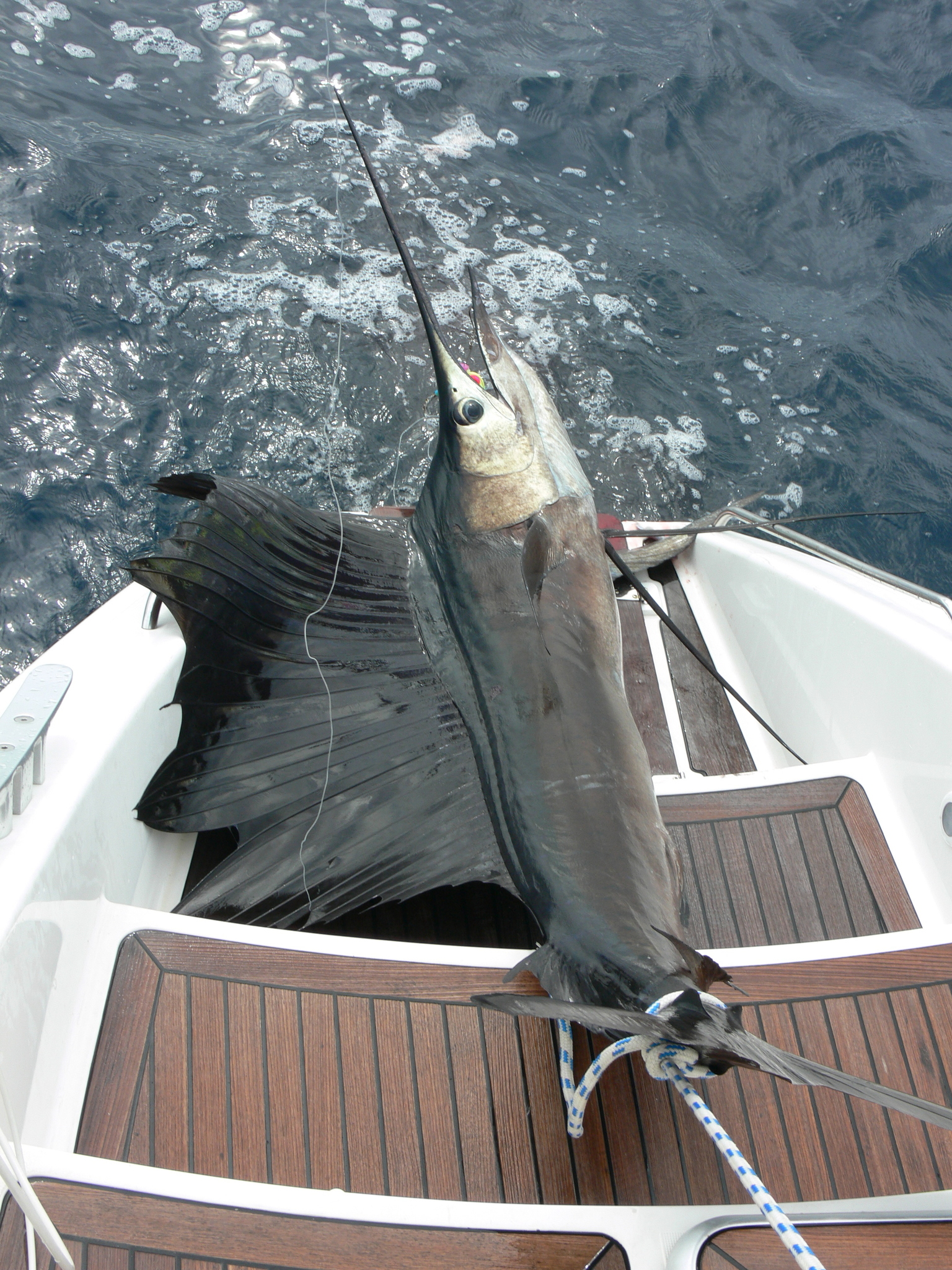

Conservation status
- Vulnerable (IUCN 3.1)

Scientific classification
- Kingdom: Animalia
- Phylum: Chordata
- Class: Actinopterygii
- Division: Teleostei
- Order: Carangiformes
- Family: Istiophoridae
- Genus: Istiophorus
- Species: I. platypterus

Binomial name
- Istiophorus platypterus (Shaw, 1792)

Synonyms
- Xiphias platypterus Shaw, 1792; Scomber gladius Bloch, 1793; Histiophorus gladius (Bloch, 1793); Istiophorus gladius (Bloch, 1793); Xiphias velifer Bloch & Schneider, 1801; Istiophorus gladifer Lacépède, 1801; Histiophorus immaculatus Rüppell, 1830; Istiophorus immaculatus (Rüppell, 1830); Histiophorus indicus Cuvier, 1832; Histiophorus orientalis Temminck & Schlegel, 1844; Istiophorus orientalis (Temminck & Schlegel, 1844); Istiophorus triactis Klunzinger, 1871; Istiophorus dubius Bleeker, 1872; Istiophorus japonicus Jordan & Thompson, 1914; Istiophorus eriquius Jordan & Ball, 1926; Istiophorus greyi Jordan & Evermann, 1926; Istiophorus brookei Fowler, 1933; Istiophorus ludibundus Whitley, 1933; Istiophorus amarui Curtiss, 1944

= Indo-Pacific sailfish =

Species of ray-finned fish

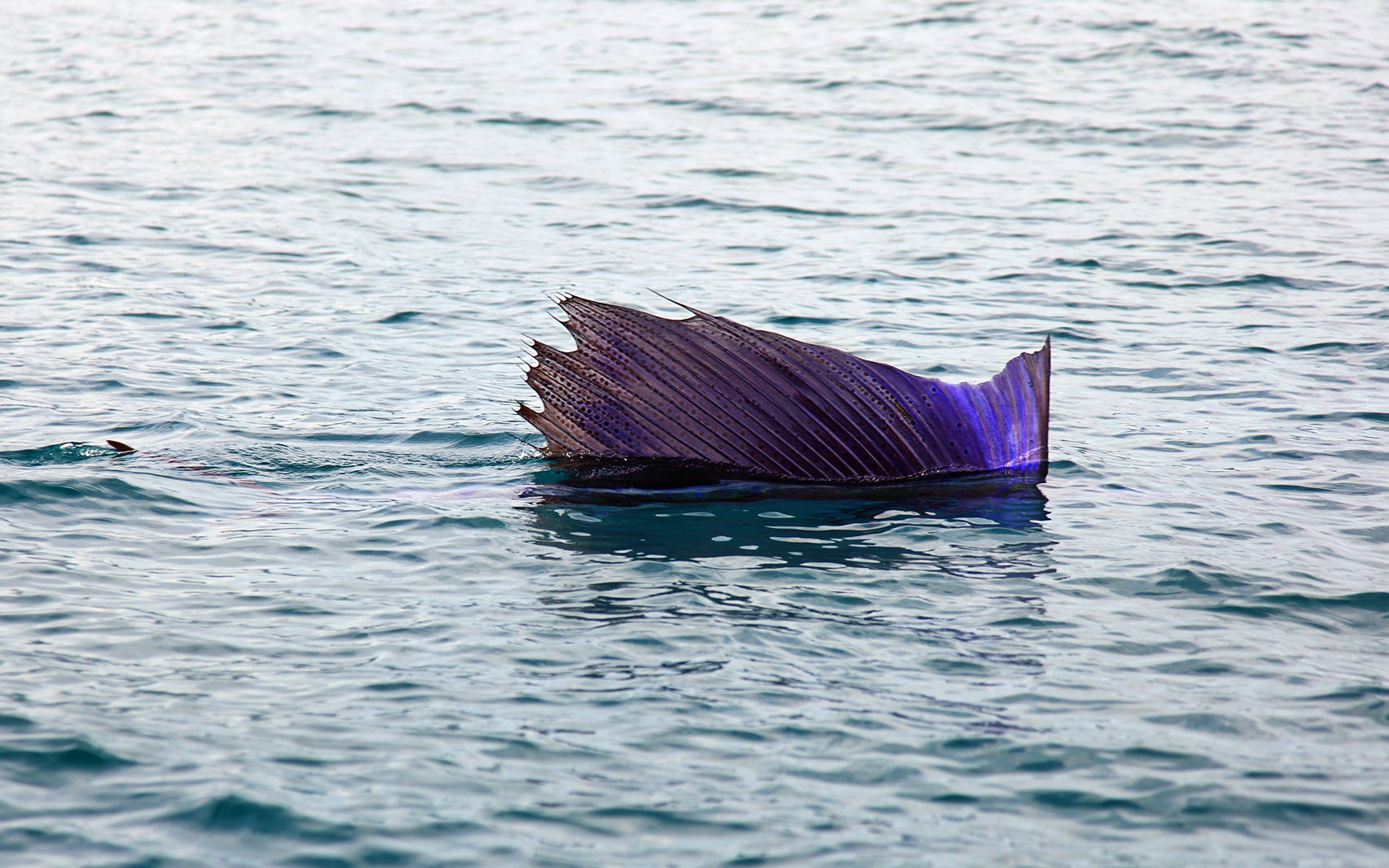
Exhibiting sail-raising behavior

The Indo-Pacific sailfish (Istiophorus platypterus) is a sailfish native to the Indian and Pacific Oceans and is naturalized in the Atlantic where it has entered the Mediterranean Sea via the Suez Canal as a Lessepsian migrant. It is dark blue on top, brown-blue laterally, silvery white underbelly; upper jaw elongated in the form of a spear; first dorsal fin greatly enlarged in the form of a sail, with many black cones, its front squared off, highest at its midpoint; pelvic fins very narrow, reaching almost to the anus; body covered with embedded scales, blunt at end; lateral line curved above pectoral fin, then straight to base of tail. They have a large and sharp bill, which they use for hunting. They feed on tuna, mackerel, sardine and anchovy, some of the fastest fish in the ocean, as well as cephalopods and crustaceans. Most authorities only recognise a single species of sailfish, I. platypterus.

It is theorized by marine biologists that the 'sail' (dorsal fin array) of the sailfish may serve the purpose of a cooling and heating system for this fish; this due to a network of a large number of blood vessels found in the sail and because of "sail-raising" behaviour exhibited by the sailfish at or near the surface waters after or before high-speed bursts.

The IUCN recognizes this species as the cosmopolitan sailfish, where FishBase recognizes two species.

== Fisheries ==
Common and widespread in the tropical and sub-tropical Atlantic and Indo-Pacific oceans, ranging into temperate waters.

Although targeted in some areas, the species is mostly taken as bycatch by tuna longliners. Sailfish are not as highly valued as marlin, and are usually released. They are considered a hard-fighting game fish by recreational anglers.

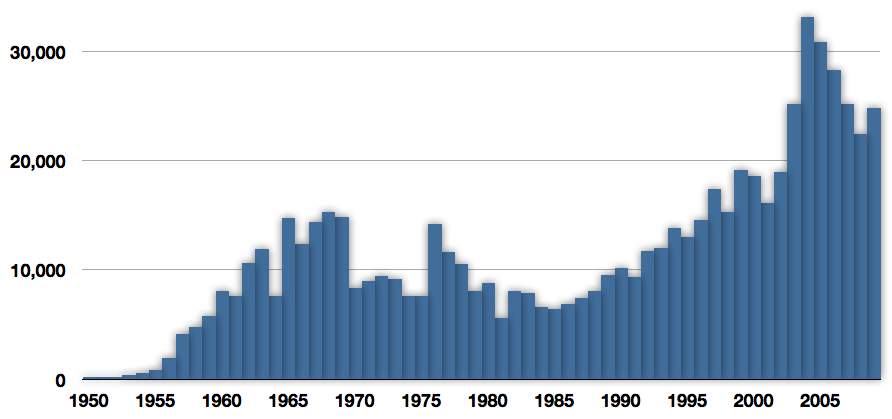
Capture of Indo-Pacific sailfish in tonnes from 1950 to 2009
