= Marlin fishing =

Type of offshore saltwater game fishing

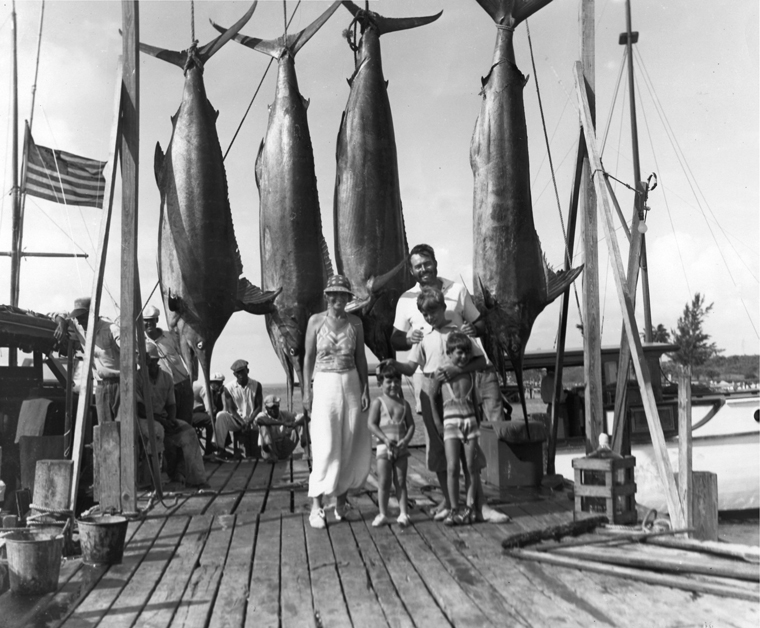
Ernest Hemingway with his family and four marlin in 1935

Marlin fishing or billfishing is an offshore saltwater game fishing targeting several species of fast-swimming pelagic predatory fish with elongated rostrum collectively known as billfish, which include those from the families Istiophoridae (marlin, spearfish and sailfish) and Xiphiidae (swordfish). It is considered by some fishermen to be a pinnacle of big-game fishing, due to the size, speed and power of the billfish and their relative elusiveness.

Of all the billfish species, 10 of them are of the most interest to blue water anglers: Atlantic and Pacific blue marlin, black marlin, white marlin, striped marlin, Atlantic sailfish, Indo-Pacific sailfish, longbill spearfish, shortbill spearfish and the swordfish.

Fishing for marlin captured the imagination of some sport fishermen in the 1930s, when well-known angler/authors Zane Grey, who fished for black, striped and blue marlin in the Pacific, and Ernest Hemingway, who fished the Florida Keys, Bahamas and Cuba for Atlantic blue marlin and white marlin, wrote extensively about their pursuit and enthused about the sporting qualities of their quarry. These days, a lot of resources are committed to the construction of private and charter billfishing boats to participate in the billfishing tournament circuit. These are expensive purpose-built offshore vessels with powerfully driven deep sea hulls. They are often built to luxury standards and equipped with many technologies to ease the life of the deep sea recreational fisherman, including outriggers, flying bridges and fighting chairs, and state of the art fishfinders and navigation electronics.

== Blue marlin ==
The blue marlin of the Atlantic and Pacific oceans is the most pursued marlin species by sport fishermen. Its wide distribution in tropical oceanic waters, and seasonally into temperate zones, makes it accessible to many anglers. It is also sought for its potential to reach large sizes and for its fighting ability.

=== Biology and life history ===
Blue marlin are one of the world's largest bony fish and although adult males seldom exceed 330 pounds (150 kg), females may reach far larger sizes well in excess of 1,000 pounds (450 kg). A Pacific blue weighing 1,805 pounds (819 kg) caught in 1970 by a party of anglers fishing out of Oahu, Hawaii, aboard the charter boat Coreene C skippered by Capt. Cornelius Choy (this fish often referred to as "Choy's Monster") still stands as the largest marlin caught on rod and reel. This fish was found to have a yellowfin tuna of over 155 pounds (70 kg) in its belly. In the Atlantic, the heaviest sport-fishing capture is Paulo Amorim's 1,402-pound (636 kg) fish from Vitoria, Brazil. Commercial fishermen have boated far larger specimens, with the largest blue marlin brought into Tsukiji market in Tokyo supposedly weighing a massive 2,438 pounds (1,106 kg).

A blue marlin over 1,000 pounds (450 kg) is known as a "grander". Fish of this size are very difficult to catch, making them highly valued amongst anglers.

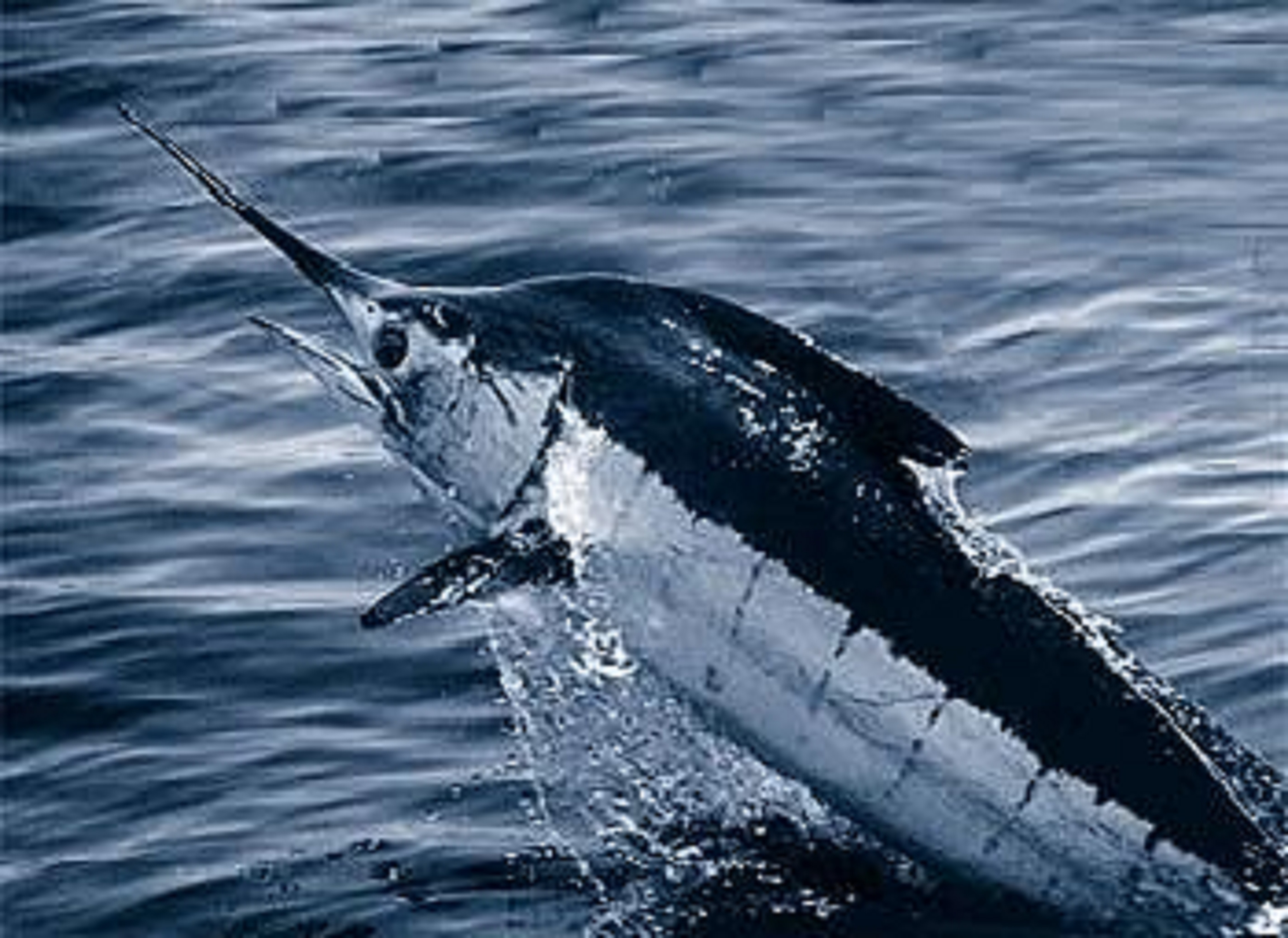
Atlantic blue marlin

Blue marlin occur widely in the tropical oceanic waters of the Atlantic and the Indo-Pacific, with many fish making seasonal migrations into the temperate waters of the Northern and Southern Hemispheres to take advantage of feeding opportunities as those waters in spring and summer. Warm currents such as the Gulf Stream in the western Atlantic and the Agulhas Current in the western Indian Ocean serve as oceanic highways for blue marlin migration, and have a major influence on their seasonal distribution. Blue marlin have a limited ability to thermoregulate, and the lower limit of their temperature tolerance is thought to be in the region of about 20 °C (68 °F) although individual fish have been caught in cooler temperatures. Larger individuals have the greatest temperature tolerance, and blue marlin encountered at the limits of their range tend to be large fish. This wide distribution brings blue marlin in contact with anglers in many parts of the world.

Blue marlin are eclectic feeders preying on a wide range of prey species and sizes. Scientific examination of blue marlin stomach contents has yielded organisms as small as miniature filefish. Common food items include tuna-like fishes, particularly skipjack tuna and frigate mackerel (also known as frigate tuna), squid, mackerel, and scad. Of more interest to sport fishermen is the upper range of blue marlin prey size. A 72-inch (1,800 mm) white marlin has been recorded as being found in the stomach of a 448 pounds (203 kg) blue marlin caught at Walker's Cay in the Bahamas, and more recently, during the 2005 White Marlin Open, a white marlin in the 70-pound (32 kg) class was found in the stomach of one of the money-winning blues. Shortbill spearfish of 30 to 40 pounds (14 to 18 kg) have been recorded as feed items by Kona blue marlin fishermen. Yellowfin and bigeye tuna of 100 pounds (45 kg) or more have also been found in the stomachs of large blue marlin.

=== Fishing techniques ===
Fishing styles and gear used in the pursuit of blue marlin vary, depending on the size of blue marlin common to the area, the size of fish being targeted, local sea conditions, and often local tradition. The main methods used by sport fishermen are fishing with artificial lures, rigged natural baits, or live bait.

==== Natural bait fishing ====
The pioneers of blue marlin angling employed natural baits rigged to skip and swim. Today, rigged baits, particularly Spanish mackerel and horse ballyhoo continue to be widely used for blue marlin. Also, the American eel is considered to be one of the best rigged baits due to its natural swim tendencies when properly rigged. Trolling for blue marlin with rigged baits, sometimes combined with an artificial lure or skirt to make "skirted baits" or "bait/lure combinations", is still widely practiced, especially along the eastern seaboard of the United States and in the Bahamas, the Caribbean, and Venezuela. Rigged natural baits are also used as "pitch baits" that are deployed after fish are raised to hookless lures or "teasers".

==== Artificial lure fishing ====
Blue marlin are aggressive fish that respond well to the splash, bubble trail, and action of a well-presented artificial lure. Trolling with lures is probably the most popular technique used by blue marlin crews today. Hawaii is recognized as the birthplace of lure trolling for marlin, with skippers operating from the Kona Coast of the Big Island of Hawaii developing many designs still used today. The earliest marlin lures were carved from wood, cast in drink glasses, or made from chrome bath towel pipes and skirted with rubber inner tubes or vinyl upholstery material cut into strips. Today, marlin lures are produced in a huge variety of shapes, sizes, and colours, mass-produced by large manufacturers and individually crafted by small-scale, custom makers.

A typical marlin lure is a small (7–8 in or 180–200 mm), medium (10–12 in or 250–300 mm) to large (14 in or 360 mm or more) artificial with a shaped plastic or metal head to which a plastic skirt is attached. The design of the lure head, particularly its face, gives the lure its individual action when trolled through the water. Lure actions range from an active side-to-side swimming pattern to pushing water aggressively on the surface to, most commonly, tracking along in a straight line with a regular surface pop and bubble trail. Besides the shape, weight, and size of the lure head, the length and thickness of skirting, the number and size of hooks, and the length and size of the leader used in lure rigging all influence the action of the lure: how actively it will run and how it will respond to different sea conditions. Experienced anglers often fine-tune their lures to get the action they want.

Lures are normally fished at speeds of 7.5 to 9.0 knots (13.9 to 16.7 km/h; 8.6 to 10.4 mph); faster speeds in the 10-to-15-knot (19 to 28 km/h; 12 to 17 mph) range are also employed, primarily by boats with slower cruising speeds traveling from spot to spot. These speeds allow quite substantial areas to be effectively worked in a day's fishing. A pattern of four or more lures is trolled at varying distances behind the boat. Lures may be fished either straight from the rod tip ("flat lines"), or from outriggers.

==== Live-bait fishing ====
Live-bait fishing for blue marlin normally uses small tuna species, with skipjack generally considered the best choice. As trolling speed is limited because baits must be trolled slowly to remain alive, live-baiting is normally chosen where fishing areas are relatively small and easily covered, such as near fish aggregating device buoys and in the vicinity of steep underwater ledges.

=== Blue marlin angling destinations ===
Areas where bottom structure (islands, seamounts, banks, and the edge of the continental shelf) creates upwelling, which brings deep nutrient-rich water close to the surface, are particularly favoured by blue marlin.

==== Atlantic ====
In the western Atlantic, blue marlin may be found as far north as George's Bank and the continental shelf canyons off Cape Cod, influenced by the warm current of the Gulf Stream, and as far south as southern Brazil. In the eastern Atlantic, their seasonal range extends northward to the Algarve coast of Portugal and southward to the southern coast of Angola.

Atlantic blue marlin were first consistently caught by sport fishermen in the early 1930s, when anglers from Florida began to explore the Bahamas. Authors such as Ernest Hemingway and S. Kip Farrington did much to attract the attention of big-game anglers to the Bahamian islands of Bimini and Cat Cay. After the Second World War, and especially from the 1960s onwards, anglers began pursuing and finding blue marlin in destinations all over the tropical and subtropical Atlantic.

Bahamas

The Bahama Islands have long been popular destinations for fishermen seeking blue marlin. Bimini, located at the eastern edge of the Gulf Stream, has the longest history of blue marlin fishing in the islands, dating back to the 1930s and 1940s when anglers such as Michael Lerner, Ernest Hemingway, and S. Kip Farrington fished there . From the 1960s, more outlying areas such as Walker's Cay and the Abaco islands have developed as blue marlin grounds. The Bahamas is home to one of the most intensely competitive tournament series in marlin fishing, the Bahamas Billfish Championship.

Bermuda

The banks lying off the hook-shaped island of Bermuda consistently produce blue marlin. Many Bermudian fish are small specimens in the 150-to-250-pound (68 to 113 kg) class, but every year much bigger fish in the 600-pound (270 kg) and larger class are caught. A 1,352 pounds (613 kg) giant boated aboard the Mako IV, skippered by Captain Allen DeSilva, in 1995, stands as the largest blue marlin caught in Bermudian waters. This fish is also one of the largest blue marlin ever boated in the Atlantic.

Brazil

Blue marlin are fished by sport fishermen operating from several locations along the Atlantic coast of Brazil. Blue marlin have been encountered as far south as São Paulo, and are regularly hooked and caught in annual tournaments held offshore of Rio de Janeiro. However, the majority of international attention has thus far focused on Canavieiras, the gateway to the Royal Charlotte Bank, an extensive area of bottom structure that holds billfish, tuna, and other pelagics in great numbers; and on Cabo Frio, where an annual tournament has produced several fish weighing in excess of 1,000 pounds (450 kg).

The city of Vitória is considered one of the finest locations for blue marlin fishing by many anglers. Fishing is a popular activity in Vitória, attracting fishermen from other states and countries due to the large population of marlin and sailfish off the coast of Espírito Santo. Largest of the many big blue marlin caught at Vitória is the International Game Fish Association all-tackle record, held by Paulo Amorim, who caught a blue marlin that weighed 636 kilograms (1,402 lb).

Cape Verde Islands

This cluster of islands in the eastern tropical Atlantic has proved to be an outstanding blue marlin fishery since it was first seriously fished in the 1980s. Blue marlin may be caught year-round in Cape Verde, but the best fishing seems to take place between March and May when large numbers of blue marlin concentrate in island waters. Blues encountered off Cape Verde range widely in size, with many fish of 100 to 350 pounds (45 to 159 kg) and good numbers of larger fish in the 400-to-600-pound (180 to 270 kg) class. The biggest catch from Cape Verde waters is a 1,241-pound (563 kg) fish caught in September 2006 near the island of Saint Vincent by angler Barry Silleman fishing with skipper Berno Niebuhr. Incidental catches include wahoo and large yellowfin tuna.

Mexico (Atlantic coast)

In the eastern Yucatán, charter boats operating from Cozumel, Isla Mujeres and Playa del Carmen encounter blue marlin in addition to numerous white marlin and sailfish from late March through July, when the waters of the Gulf Stream bring billfish through the area. These blue marlin of the western Caribbean tend to be smaller. While large specimens can top 500 pounds (230 kg), 250-to-350-pound (110 to 160 kg) fish are far more common.

Portugal

Although blue marlin are being caught in increasing numbers on the Algarve coast of Portugal, the main centres of blue marlin fishing in Portugal are the oceanic islands of the Azores and Madeira.

The small port of Horta on Faial Island is synonymous with blue marlin fishing in the nine-island chain of the Azores. The season normally begins in late June or early July and continues until weather conditions put an end to the fishery in mid- to late October. Weather conditions can be unpredictable at the end of the season, but in midsummer when the area is dominated by the Azores high, the seas can be very flat.

Although blue marlin can be found close to Faial, boats seeking them often select three banks that serve as productive feeding locations for these fish. The Azores sits in the northern extreme of blue marlin distribution and the fishery is dominated by large fish. Large 400-to-600-pound (180 to 270 kg) fish are average here and every year fish of 1,000 pounds (450 kg) and above are encountered. The Azores is home to Atlantic blue marlin records for, amongst others, IGFA 50-and-80-pound (23 and 36 kg)-line classes.

Blue marlin fishing in Madeira was pioneered by local anglers in the 1960s and 1970s, and a number of large blue marlin were caught during the 1980s, but the focus for most visiting anglers tended to be sharks and the prolific schools of bigeye tuna. After the mid-1990s, however, the attention of blue marlin fishermen was drawn to the island after several exceptional captures, including eight fish weighing over 1,000 pounds (450 kg) in 1994 alone.

Between 1997 and 2000, blue marlin fishing in Madeira, along with the other Atlantic islands, underwent a severe downturn, blamed by many on the strong El Niño event of 1996–1997. From 2001 onwards, conditions began to improve, and the seasons of 2005 and 2006 have seen Madeira return to some of its former glory. June and July appear to be the premier months for blue marlin fishing. A small fleet of charter boats operate out of the small marina in the island's largest town, Funchal. The most popular fishing grounds are situated on the south coast of the island, sheltered by the high cliffs from the prevailing northeast trade winds. Fishing generally takes place within a few miles of the island and many great fish are caught well within 2 miles (3.2 km) of the shoreline. Lure fishing is the most successful method with a wide variety of medium to large artificials from various sources being successful.

Spain

Although a number of blue marlin have been brought into ports along the Atlantic coast of mainland Spain, the subtropical archipelago of the Canary Islands is by far the most prolific blue marlin grounds in Spain. Blue marlin appear seasonally in the Canary Islands between May and October, with some individuals having been caught earlier and later in the year. The average size of blue marlin encountered in the Canary Islands tends to be large, in the 400-to-600-pound (180 to 270 kg) class, including some very large fish upwards of 800 pounds (360 kg). Smaller fish in the 200-to-350-pound (91 to 159 kg) class also make an appearance at times.

Sport fishing boats may be chartered from the main islands of Lanzarote, Fuerteventura, and Tenerife; from the smaller islands of Graciosa and La Gomera; and from Puerto Rico de Gran Canaria on the island of Gran Canaria, which has historically been the main destination for marlin fishing there and still boasts the largest fleet of charter boats in the islands. In recent years, La Gomera has steadily gained attention amongst European and international marlin fishermen with numerous blue marlin catches, including fish over 1,100 pounds (500 kg). Blue marlin are caught both offshore and inside the island's shelf, which often holds abundant schools of bait fish, mainly mackerel and scad.

United States

The Outer Banks of North Carolina have long been known for their blue marlin fishing. Since the early 1950s when Ernal Foster on the Albatross I made the first charter fishing trips for blue marlin, Cape Hatteras has been known as an important destination for the sport fisherman. Other important fishing centers include Morehead City, home to the famous Big Rock Blue Marlin Tournament, and Oregon Inlet. The proximity of the Gulf Stream and of the continental shelf edge in the Cape Hatteras area create a productive combination of current, blue water, and ocean temperature that attracts a wide variety of gamefish including blue marlin.

While the average size of a blue marlin is typically 250 to 400 pounds (110 to 180 kg), big fish inhabit these waters. North Carolina was home to the former all-tackle world record Atlantic blue marlin, a 1,128-pound (512 kg) fish that also stood as the world record for 80-pound (36 kg) class tackle for over 17 years. The state record, which stood for many years at 1,142 pounds (518 kg), was finally exceeded by a 1,228-pound (557 kg) blue taken off Nags Head on 15 August 2008.

Venezuela

Venezuela's La Guaira Bank has some of the most prolific blue marlin fishing in the Atlantic. Blue marlin are present year round with particularly high numbers in spring. Trolling with ballyhoo baits using relatively light tackle, often in the 30-pound (14 kg) class, is popular for the variety of billfish species that can make an appearance in these waters.

Virgin Islands

The island of St Thomas in the US Virgin Islands is one of the most renowned blue marlin destinations. Full moons from June to October can accompany some intense blue marlin fishing in the area known as the 'North Drop'. Lure fishing, trolling natural baits, and bait and switch are all popular. The former all-tackle world-record Atlantic blue of 1,282 pounds (582 kg) was boated there.

==== Indo-Pacific ====
In the Pacific, blue marlin are seasonally found as far north as southern Japan and as far south as the Bay of Plenty in the North Island of New Zealand. Blue marlin in the eastern Pacific migrate as far north as Southern California and as far south as northern Peru. The southern limit of their distribution in the eastern Indian Ocean appears to be the waters of Albany and Perth in Western Australia, and in the western Indian Ocean blue marlin have been taken as far south as Cape Town.

Blue marlin have probably been known to Japanese high-seas fishermen for centuries. However, the Pacific blue marlin was not officially considered to be a separate species (though still debated) until 1954; prior to then, Pacific blues were known as "silver marlin" or often confused with black marlin. The capture of a 1,002-pound (454 kg) Pacific blue marlin by skipper George Parker of Kona, Hawaii, was instrumental in clearing up the identification of Pacific marlin species. Hawaii has continued to be the major center of blue marlin fishing in the Pacific, and Hawaiian blue marlin techniques have been disseminated throughout the Pacific Basin by travelling anglers and crews, influencing blue marlin fisheries as distant as Japan and Australia.

Australia

Blue marlin range on both the east and west coasts of Australia, with fish being recorded as far south as the Tasmanian east coast and Albany on the west coast.

Notable regions to fish for blue marlin in Australia are off Cairns, southern Queensland from Fraser Island to the Gold Coast, Port Stephens and Sydney, the New South Wales south coast region, Rottnest Island off Perth, and Exmouth and Broome in Western Australia. On the east Australian coast, blue marlin are a popular target for anglers fishing from such ports as Port Stephens, Sydney, and the southern ports of Ulladulla, Batemans Bay, and Bermagui. However, the best scores in terms of numbers of fish have come from boats fishing the Gold Coast.

A blue marlin over 1,000 pounds (450 kg) has been officially recorded in Australian waters, several blue marlin over 400 kilograms (880 lb) have been boated or released by Australian anglers; fish larger than a thousand pounds have been hooked, but none so far landed. The Australian record capture (which is also the ladies' all-tackle world record) weighed just under 1,000 pounds (450 kg). Its weight, 997 pounds (452 kg), was caught on 37-kilogram (82 lb) tackle whilst fishing from Batemans Bay on the Australian New South Wales south coast. Apparently, it took some time for the fish to be weighed, which almost certainly robbed the angler of a fish reaching 1,000 pounds (450 kg). This fish was caught in March 1999 by the then 27-year-old female angler Melanie Kisbee fishing from a boat named Radiant, a 28-foot (8.5 m) Bertram, which was captained by the late Paul Gibson. The fish was caught on a Topgun lure called "Awesome" in blue and pink.

Previous Australian records have been held by a 417-kilogram (919 lb) fish also captured from the port of Batemans Bay during the Tollgate Island Classic, a capture which helped to put Batemans Bay on the map for big blue marlin, and a fish of around 370 kilograms (820 lb) captured in Bermagui by angler Wayne Cummings. A large marlin washed up on a beach in Western Australia weighing 540 kilograms (1,190 lb) in June 2013.

Larger blue marlin appear to be captured in years when the water temperate is warmer than usual. On the New South Wales coast, water temperatures of 24 °C (75 °F) brought down the coast by the warmer south east current appear to produce the best blue marlin fishing and the largest blue marlin. The fishing season in Australia for blue marlin is January to May–June.

Lure fishing, live bait and switch-baiting are all used successfully for blue marlin in Australia. Blue marlin are targeted by some anglers and are also encountered whilst fishing for the more abundant striped marlin.

Ecuador

For more than 60 years, the waters of the Humboldt Current which sweep past Peru and Ecuador have been fished by sports fishermen.

In 1951, a group of mainly American sports fishermen set up the Cabo Blanco Fishing Club at Cabo Blanco in the far north of Peru, close to the border with Ecuador. Some of the greatest marlin fishing in the world took place here until the club closed in the 1960s.

Today, the main centres for fishing this area of the Pacific coast are further north, in Ecuador, and the fishery has shifted from the pioneer fishing locations inshore, where black marlin and swordfish were fished by presenting baits to sighted fish, to further offshore for blue marlin, striped marlin, and tuna. Salinas is the most well-known billfishing location, and seasonally offers good fishing for large striped marlin, as well as blue marlin and other gamefish, such as bigeye tuna. The other popular blue marlin destination in the country is Manta, which is usually in season when Salinas is not. A large fleet of sport-fishing vessels operates from both towns. Blues in this area are known to reach large sizes, with the most notable capture being a 1,014-pound (460 kg) fish boated by local angler Jorge Jurado which formerly held the IGFA 80-pound (36 kg)-class record.

Hawaii

More blue marlin are probably caught by rod and reel in the Hawaiian Islands than anywhere in the world. Over 60 fish over 1,000 pounds (450 kg) have been weighed in Hawaiian waters, including the two largest marlin caught on rod and reel: a 1,805-pound (819 kg) fish caught from Oahu by Capt. Cornelius Choy and a 1,656-pound (751 kg) fish caught off Kona by angler Gary Merriman aboard the Black Bart, skippered by Capt. Bart Miller, in March 1984.

The town of Kona on the lee coast of the island of Hawaii is internationally known for its blue marlin fishing, the skill and experience of its top skippers (many of whom are also skilled lure makers), and its long-standing Hawaiian International Billfish Tournament. A large fleet of sport-fishing vessels operates from Honokohau Harbor. Blue marlin skippers in the Hawaiian Islands employ both lure-fishing and live-baiting techniques.

New Zealand

Although a blue marlin weighing over 1,000 pounds (450 kg) was caught in the Bay of Islands as early as 1968, striped marlin have traditionally been the main billfish species in the New Zealand fishery. However, Pacific blue marlin captures have increased in New Zealand over the last 10 years, and blue marlin are now consistently caught from along the eastern coast of the North Island. The Waihau Bay and Cape Runaway area is particularly well known for blue marlin. Blue marlin encountered in New Zealand tend to be of large average size with most averaging 300 to 500 pounds (140 to 230 kg). Larger specimens in the 600-pound (270 kg)-plus class are hooked and landed every year. Most New Zealand blue marlin are taken by lure fishing, with a wide variety of locally made and imported lures being popular.

Tahiti

In 1930, the American angler Zane Grey boated the first blue marlin weighing over 1,000 pounds (450 kg), fishing a few miles south of Mataiea, Tahiti. Although damaged by a shark bite, this fish weighed in at 1,040 pounds (470 kg), a remarkable capture on the primitive fishing tackle of that era.

Offshore fishing in Tahiti began to develop in earnest in the 1960s, following the establishment of the Haura (marlin) Club of Tahiti in 1962. Today, seven gamefishing clubs exist in the Society Islands. As in Hawaii, the average size of blue marlin in Tahitian waters is in the 90-to-130-kilogram (200 to 290 lb) range, but many larger individuals in the 400-pound (180 kg) and larger class are boated each year.

Vanuatu

The island nation of Vanuatu appears to be the premier destination for blue marlin in the South Pacific and one of the best fisheries for Pacific blues in the world. A ratified 1,142-pound (518 kg) fish was landed in August 2007.

== Black marlin ==
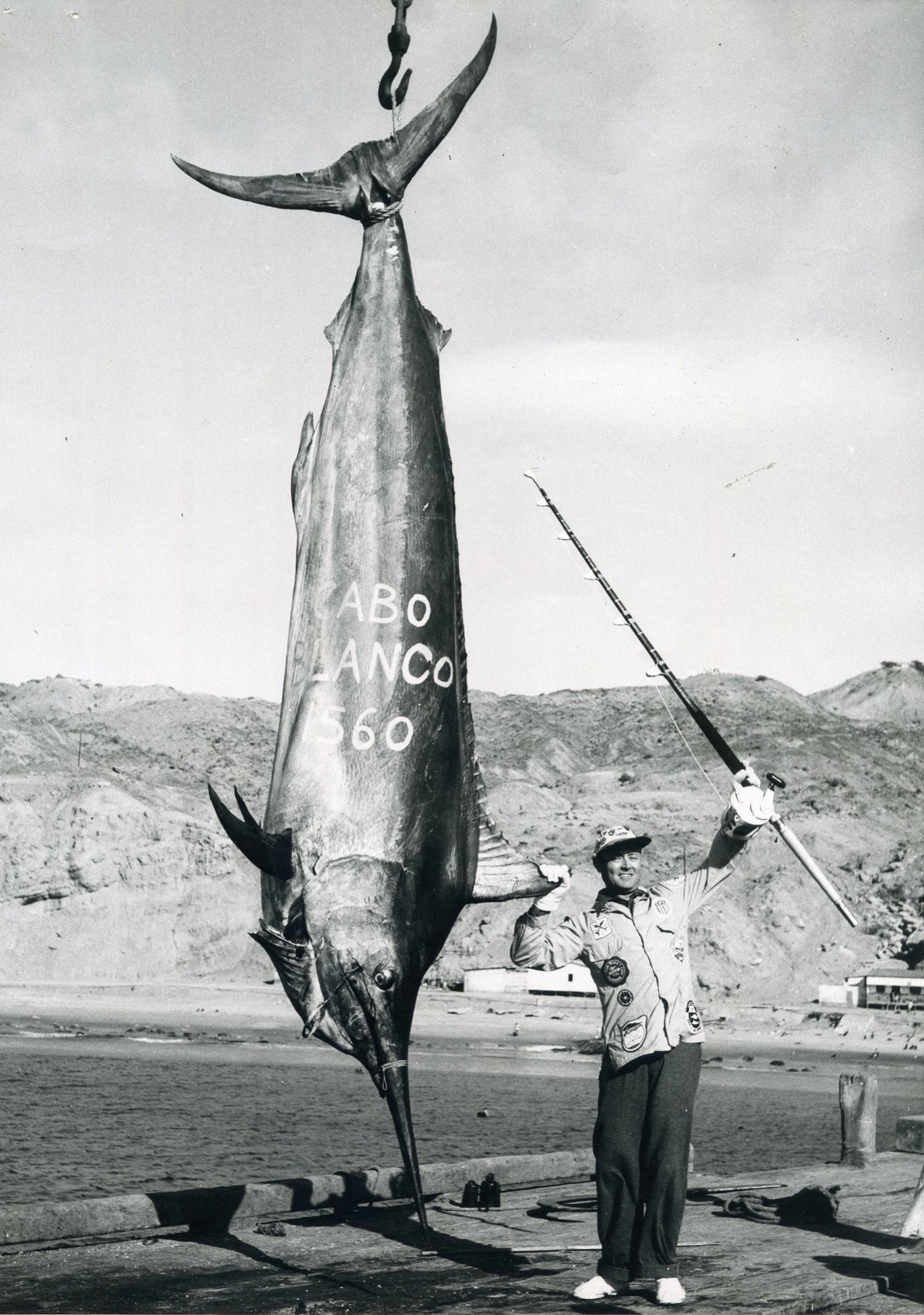
Alfred C. Glassell Jr. with his record-breaking black marlin weighing at 1,560 pounds (710 kg), caught in 1953 off of Cabo Blanco, Peru

Black marlin (Makaira indica) are found in the Indian and Pacific Oceans with some vagrant individuals having been reported from the south Atlantic.

=== Fishing techniques ===
Black marlin fishing has traditionally conducted with rigged dead baits, both skipping and swimming. In the historic Cabo Blanco fishery, little blind trolling was done; instead, the billfish (striped marlin, black marlin, and swordfish) were sighted cruising or finning on the surface and baited. In the Cairns fishery, a wide variety of baitfish species are used successfully, including kawa kawa and other small tunas, queenfish, and scad. Baits range from 2-pound (0.91 kg) scad to dogtooth tuna and narrowbarred mackerel of 20 pounds (9.1 kg) and more.

The use of live bait is also popular for targeting both large and small black marlin, and under the right circumstances, is extremely effective, although sharks and other nontargeted gamefish can often be a problem with this method. Small live baits such as slimy mackerel and yellowtail scad are highly effective for juvenile black marlin, and are fished both by slow trolling and drifting. Live-bait techniques for larger black marlin are similar to those used for blue marlin, normally employing bridle-rigged live tunas of 3 to 25 pounds (1.4 to 11.3 kg). The use of a downrigger has proven to be helpful in positioning baits deeper in the water column.

Artificial lures will catch black marlin of all sizes from 30-to-40-pound (14 to 18 kg) juveniles to the giant females of 1,200 pounds (540 kg) and more. The prevalence of lure-damaging bycatch such as wahoo, barracuda, and Spanish (narrowbarred) mackerel in some areas can make lure fishing an expensive proposition. However, the faster pace of lure fishing allows larger areas to be searched effectively, which can be an advantage if the fish seem more dispersed.

=== Angling destinations ===
Africa

Bazaruto Archipelago in Mozambique is a highly productive fishery for giant black marlin. From its discovery in the 1950s to the Mozambican Civil War, many fish over 1,000 pounds (454 kg) were caught. In recent years, the area has been the focus of renewed interest. In November 1998, a fish weighing 1,298 pounds (589 kg) was caught in Bazaruto, making it the all-African record for black marlin.

Australia

In February 1913, Mark Lidwill, fishing off Port Stephens, brought in the first black marlin ever caught on rod and reel. This fish, which weighed around 70 pounds (32 kg), was the first marlin caught by a sport fisherman in Australia, and is also thought to be the first marlin of any species caught on rod and reel.

Today, the Australian town of Cairns is considered the world capital of black marlin fishing. The Great Barrier Reef is the only confirmed breeding ground for black marlin, as they synchronize their breeding with the myctophid breeding aggregations and coral spawns of September, October, and November. The majority of sport-fishing effort for black marlin off the Great Barrier Reef takes place from Lizard Island to Cairns.

Black marlin can be caught to a size of 1,200 to 1,300 pounds (540 to 590 kg) in this area. Many domestic and international anglers visit the region during the September to November period in the hope of catching the "fish of a lifetime".

Black marlin travel south along the east Australian coast during the Southern Hemisphere summer, and are fished for by many anglers along the Queensland and New South Wales coasts. Juvenile black marlin are often found in as shallow as 20 fathoms (37 m) or even less, and are available to anglers fishing from small outboard-powered boats. Port Stephens, the site of the first black marlin capture on rod and reel, is one of the most popular fishing areas for black marlin today, and is the site of the Southern Hemisphere's largest billfish tournament, the Port Stephens Interclub.

Costa Rica

Quepos in Costa Rica is known for its production of trophy billfish. Anglers from all over have traveled and caught all three species of Marlin, in these exceptional fishing conditions. It has been known that anglers have caught Black Marlin in excess of 1,500 pounds and 16 feet in length. One of the most common tactics to catch the Black Marlin is with live large Bonita or big ballyhoo on a slow troll. In fact, Ernest Hemingway caught an exceptionally large Marlin in Quepos, reaching a length of 18 feet, adding to the reputation for these legendary waters.

In particular, one reason Quepos is known for the high numbers of Marlin caught is the FAD's that are offshore. The FAD's are Fish Aggregating Devices that essentially attracts open ocean fish such as the Marlin to a buoy located offshore. This increases the fish in one area and allows for anglers to have record setting numbers on single day trips offshore. But this does not only attract big Black Marlin, the area is also known for some of the world's best Sailfish and Blue Marlin fishing. In a single day tournament in 2015, there were 940 sailfish released in the waters off of Quepos. Home to many fly fishing world records, Quepos is a place in the history books, whether it is the trophy size to the Pacific Ocean billfish or the way they have been caught throughout history, the fishing here does not look to be slowing down anytime soon.

Ecuador

Although most of the marlin captures in Ecuadorian waters today are blue and striped marlin, the black marlin brought this area of the southeast Pacific to fame in the 1950s, when many fish of over 1,000 pounds (450 kg) were boated by anglers fishing from Cabo Blanco, a small town in northern Peru, close to the border with Ecuador. The inshore grounds off the high white cliffs became known as 'Marlin Boulevard' for the numbers and size of the black marlin taken there. Greatest of the many granders captured here was the 1,560-pound (710 kg) black marlin boated by Texas oilman Alfred C. Glassell Jr., in August 1953. The Cabo Blanco Fishing Club, where most fishing operations were based, closed down in the late 1960s following a period of political upheaval in Peru. Around the same time, the Peruvian sport fishery also crashed following the overfishing of the primary baitfish, anchoveta.

Black marlin are still found in Peruvian waters, but the main sport-fishing destination in the region nowadays is further north in Salinas, Ecuador. Black marlin are normally outnumbered in catch reports by the more prolific striped and blue marlin, but some big fish continue to be caught. The traditional method of sport fishing is trolling with natural baits, large ballyhoo being commonly used, while searching for finning fish.

Mexico

Black marlin are consistently, although seldom frequently, caught in Cabo San Lucas and other Mexican fishing centres. Black marlin, along with blue marlin, are the targets of the biggest-paying marlin tournament in the world, the Bisbee's Black & Blue, which is fished in the waters off Cabo San Lucas in October. At present, the offshore structures such as Corbetana Rock and "El Banco" off Puerto Vallarta appear to offer the best fishing for black marlin in Mexican waters.

The large vessels of the San Diego Long Range fleet have also caught some hefty blacks in the 600-pound (270 kg)-plus range while fishing for yellowfin tuna at the Revillagigedos Islands. Black marlin in Mexican waters, as in most other parts of their range, tend to associate with reefs, banks, and similar offshore structures. Slow-trolling live baits such as skipjack tuna over these structures tends to be the most effective way to target black marlin. Downriggers are sometimes used to fish baits deeper.

Panama

On 11 June 1949, pioneering Panamanian angler Louis Schmidt boated a black marlin that after being cut in half and weighed, tipped the scales at 1,006 pounds (456 kg). This fish is believed to be the first black marlin of over 1,000 pounds (450 kg) caught on rod and reel.

Today, the productive reef areas in Piñas Bay, and the many other reefs and islands along the Pacific coast of Panama, particularly Coiba Island in the Gulf of Chiriqui, still have probably the best fishing for black marlin in the Western Hemisphere. Piñas Bay plays home to Tropic Star Lodge, and their renowned fleet dating back to 1961. Black marlin averaging 200 to 500 pounds (91 to 227 kg) hunt schools of rainbow runners, black skipjack, and other prey over these structures along with large Pacific sailfish and dorado. Occasional specimens will reach well over 600 pounds (270 kg). Slow trolling with bridle-rigged live skipjack is the predominant technique used to target black marlin by the Tropic Star fleet. At Coiba Island, the Hannibal Banks is among most productive areas where trolling lures is employed successfully.

== Striped marlin ==
Striped marlin (Tetrapturus audax) occur in the Indian and Pacific Oceans.

=== Fishing techniques ===
==== Live bait fishing ====
In Mexican hot spots such as Cabo San Lucas and in Southern California, anglers cast live baits such as mackerel and caballito (scad) to striped marlin that may be sighted feeding or finning on the surface.

Conventional live-bait trolling at slow speeds is also highly effective when concentrations of marlin can be located. Experienced skippers fishing from ports such as Bermagui on the south coast of New South Wales have in the recent past racked up scores of over 100 striped marlin per season fishing this relatively simple technique at the right time at the right place. Larger baits such as kahawai and skipjack tuna are often used for the large striped marlin of New Zealand.

Deep-dropping live baits with the aid of sinkers can bring live baits deeper to feeding fish. This tactic is frequently used in Mexico and Australia. It is considered somewhat lowbrow (it has been described as "snapper fishing for marlin"), but is nonetheless highly effective when deep-feeding activity occurs.

=== Angling destinations ===
Mexico

More striped marlin are caught recreationally at the Mexican tourist mecca of Cabo San Lucas than anywhere else in the world. The local fishing banks and offshore grounds are fished by large fleets of local and American sport fishing boats. Striped marlin may be caught year-round in Cabo waters, but the heaviest concentrations seem to show up in late autumn, and good numbers stay around into the spring. On 9 Dec 2007 during the Mini, WCBRT team Reelaxe released a total of 330 striped marlin in the two-day tournament, setting another tournament record for a single team in two days, with a new record of 190 striped marlin in one day. The team consisted of Chris Badsey, Dave Brackmann, Steve Brackmann, Alex Rogers, Jose Espanoza, Mark Clayton, Saul Contrearus, and Dennis Poulton. The top angler was Reelaxe angler Jose Esponoza, with a personal best and tournament record of 59 released striped marlin in a single day. Prior to that, in November 2007, the crew of the sport fishing vessel Reelaxe, fishing on the Finger Bank, set a one-day catch record of 179 striped marlin.

Australia

Although Australia is known for its black, and more recently blue, marlin fishery, striped marlin are often found in the subtropical waters of the vast island continent and are a popular target for Australian anglers. The country's largest interclub tournament is held at the Port Stephens area of New South Wales, and has produced several striped marlin records on ultralight and fly tackle. Larger striped marlin in the 250-to-300-pound (110 to 140 kg)-plus class often show up in the southern part of their range. Batemans Bay, Ulladulla and Bermagui are where fish of this class can be encountered. Live baiting, with such baits as slimy mackerel and skipjack tuna, and trolling artificial lures are the two most common techniques here, but many top crews have experienced success with fly-rod and light-tackle records using the bait-and-switch technique.

Ecuador

The Galapagos Islands are home to great concentrations of striped marlin. "Sport fishing" is technically prohibited in the Galapagos, but visitors may legally engage in what is known as pesca vivencial, or recreational fishing with licensed local guides. Guides targeting marlin operate from the island of San Cristobal. The warmer "wet" season between December and June is best for higher numbers, but larger striped marlin (200-pound or 91-kilogram-plus range) are caught during the colder late summer months.

Striped marlin are also fished from the Ecuadorian mainland. Salinas in the southern part of the country and Manta further north are the main sport-fishing bases in Ecuador. The cold Humboldt Current from the south meets the equatorial current along the Ecuadorian coastline, and when conditions are right, the combination of current, colour, and temperature breaks amass concentrations of baitfish that attract large striped marlin, as well as larger blue and black marlin, yellowfin, and bigeye tuna.

Kenya

Striped marlin are one of three marlin species that appear in east African waters. Kenya has the most well-developed sport fishery in this region, and every year, boats from Malindi, Lamu, and Watamu in the north, as well as Shimoni in the south, have excellent striped marlin fishing.

New Zealand

Marlin fishing in New Zealand waters dates back to the turn of the 20th century. Some of the largest striped marlin, over 400 pounds (180 kg), have been caught in New Zealand. The all-tackle striped marlin record of 494 pounds (224 kg) is held here, and striped marlin of over 300 pounds (140 kg) are caught in New Zealand waters every year. Some New Zealand anglers, often fishing in small trailerable boats, pursue striped marlin from Houhoura and the North Cape in the far north of the country to as far south as Gisborne, Raglan, and Napier in the south. Lure fishing is a popular fishing technique used by New Zealand marlin fishermen, with many good fish also being taken on live and rigged dead baits.

== White marlin ==
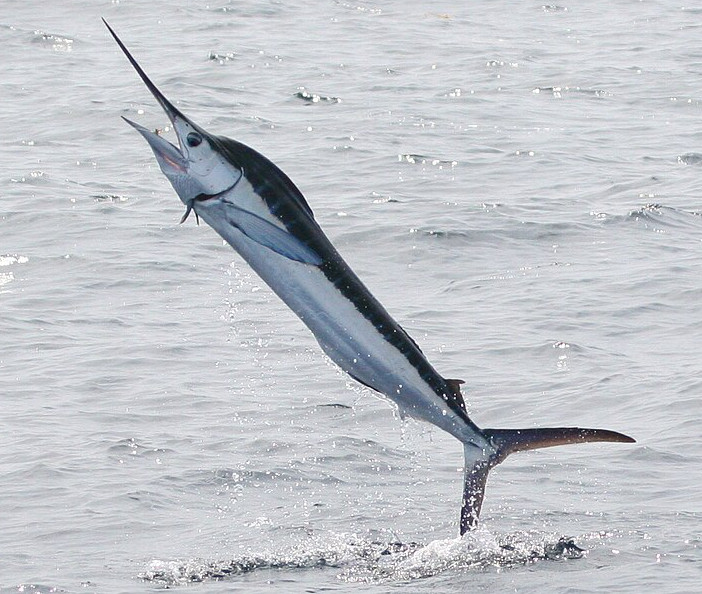
White marlin

White marlin (Tetrapturus albidus) are distributed throughout the tropical and seasonally temperate oceanic waters of the Atlantic. The smallest of the marlin species, with a potential maximum size of around 220 pounds (100 kg), they are sought after not for their size, but for their speed, leaping ability, elegant beauty, and the difficulty that anglers often encounter in baiting and hooking them. They are a premier light-tackle gamefish.

The "hatchet marlin", long thought to be a variant of the white marlin distinguished by dorsal and anal fins with a chopped-off rather than rounded appearance, has recently been confirmed as a separate species in the genus Tetrapturus, the roundscale spearfish. Nearly indistinguishable from white marlin, most tournaments treat hatchet marlin catches as white marlin. Both species are fished for in the same way.

White marlin feed on a variety of schooling baitfish, including sardine, herring, and other clupeoids; squid; mackerel; scad; saury; and smaller tuna-like fishes, such as frigate and bullet tuna. Like their close relatives the striped marlin, and sailfish, white marlin will often group together to corral schooling baitfish into a tight group for feeding purposes, a phenomenon commonly referred to as "balling bait". When this occurs, it is common for two or more fish to be raised to the baits or hooked up simultaneously.

=== Angling destinations ===
Where environmental conditions (temperature, water colour and clarity) are favourable, white marlin often forage in shallow water well inshore of the continental shelf, taking advantage of the abundant baitfish resources often found in these areas.

Brazil

Brazil is home to most of the largest white marlin in the International Game Fish Association (IGFA) record books. The IGFA all-tackle record is held by a Brazilian fish of 181 pounds (82 kg). Areas such as the Charlotte Bank have large numbers of white marlin, as well as blue marlin, sailfish, and other blue-water gamefish such as tuna and dorado.

United States

Cape Hatteras, Oregon Inlet, and other fishing areas along the coast of North Carolina benefit from the close proximity of the Gulf Stream. White marlin are often targeted by the skilled charter crews and recreational sport fisherman who fish this area, with August and September often providing some exceptional fishing.

From around mid-July onwards, white marlin, as well as the other species of Gulf Stream gamefish such as dolphinfish, yellowfin, and bigeye tuna, start showing up in the continental shelf canyons offshore of Maryland, Virginia and Delaware. The Jack Spot, an area of bottom structure 22 miles (35 km) south of Ocean City, Maryland, was for many years the most famed white marlin location in the United States. White marlin were first caught here as early as 1934, and in 1939, 171 whites were caught in a single day (29 July). The years 1969-1971 had some exceptional white marlin fishing with over 2,000 fish being caught or released per year.

Venezuela

The La Guaira Bank off the coast of Venezuela hosts great concentrations of white marlin in season. White marlin can be encountered year-round, but autumn is considered the best time to target them in Venezuelan waters. Venezuelan anglers such as Aquiles Garcia, Rafael Arnal, Ronnie Morrison, and Ruben Jaen honed their techniques and tackle in these fish-rich waters, and their experiences have contributed to many light-tackle billfishing techniques commonly used today.

== Threats ==
The main threat to marlin, along with other highly migratory pelagic fish, is commercial fishing. Billfish of all species are taken as commercial targets and as bycatch in tuna and swordfish fisheries.

Another major threat to marlin are recreational competitions that run using "catch anything" practices, such as longline fishing, driftnet fishing and other indiscriminate methods. There is also insufficient regulation to ensure that fisheries comply with rules.

Hypoxia may also be a threat to billfish populations due to the widespread decrease in life-supporting oxygen levels in more and more large areas of our oceans.

In 2010, Greenpeace International added the striped marlin, white marlin, Atlantic blue marlin, black marlin, and Indo-pacific blue marlin to its "seafood red list".

== Conservation ==
Founded in 1986 by Winthrop P. Rockefeller, The Billfish Foundation (TBF) is a nonprofit organization dedicated to conserving billfish and associated species worldwide which helps ensure healthy oceans and strong coastal economies. TBF's signature research project is the traditional tag and release program that uses the efforts of anglers to provide data and research to scientists and fisheries managers. Awareness of the need to conserve billfish stocks worldwide has led to an increasing trend for recreational anglers and skippers to release their catches in as healthy a condition as possible. In some areas of the world, commercial fishing for striped, black and blue marlin has been banned.
