= Spearfish =

Spearfish may refer to:

== Places ==
- Spearfish, South Dakota, United States
- North Spearfish, South Dakota, United States
- Spearfish Formation, a geologic formation in the United States

== Biology ==
- Tetrapturus, a genus of marlin
  - Longbill spearfish, native to the Atlantic Ocean
  - Mediterranean spearfish, native to the Mediterranean Sea
  - Shortbill spearfish, native to the Indo-Pacific
  - Roundscale spearfish, native to the Eastern Atlantic to the western Mediterranean
- Spearfish remora, a species of remora found around the world in tropical and subtropical seas
- Spearfish Fisheries Center, or D.C. Booth Historic National Fish Hatchery, operated by the U.S. Fish and Wildlife Service

== Military ==
- Spearfish torpedo, or simply Spearfish, is a modern torpedo built by GEC-Marconi
- Fairey Spearfish, a prototype dive bomber of the immediate post World War II period
- HMS Spearfish (69S), a 1936 British S-class submarine lost in World War II
- USS Spearfish (SS-190), a US submarine in World War II
