= Yachting =

Recreational boating in medium/large ships

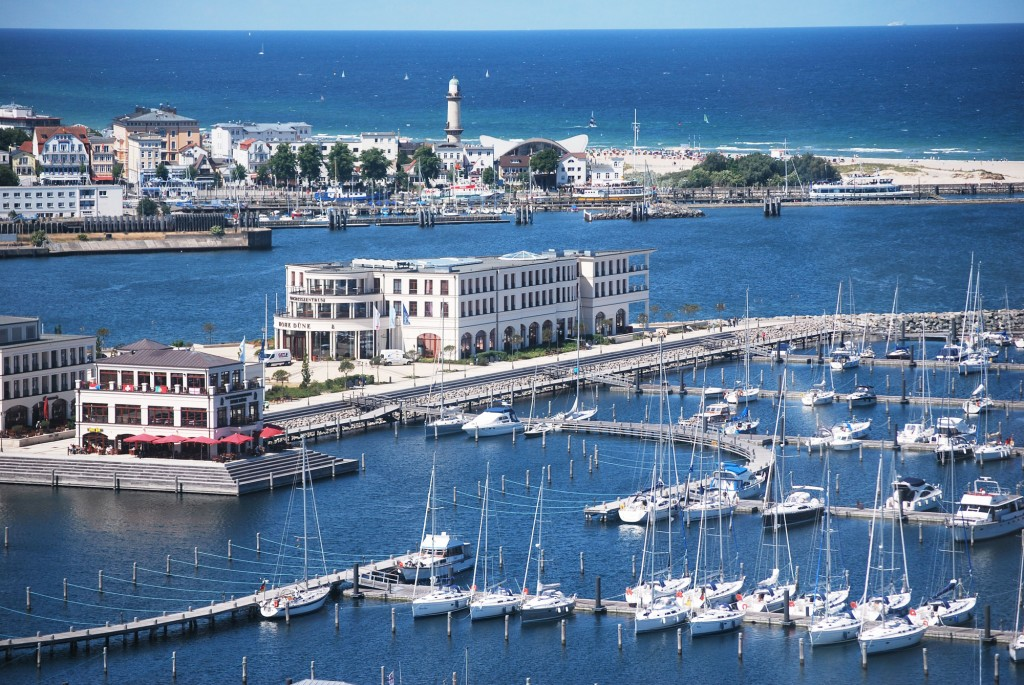
Aerial view of a yacht club and marina, Yacht Harbour Residence "Hohe Düne", in Rostock, Germany

Yachting is recreational boating activities using medium/large-sized boats or small ships collectively called yachts. Yachting is distinguished from other forms of boating mainly by the priority focus on comfort and luxury, the dependence on marinas for docking, and being typically only for exclusive social leisures such as cruising, fishing trips or racing.

The term "yacht" derives from the Dutch word jacht, meaning "hunt". When yachting with sailboats, the activity is simply called sailing; and with motorboats, it is called powerboating. A boat club that only services yachting participants is known as a yacht club.

== Racing ==
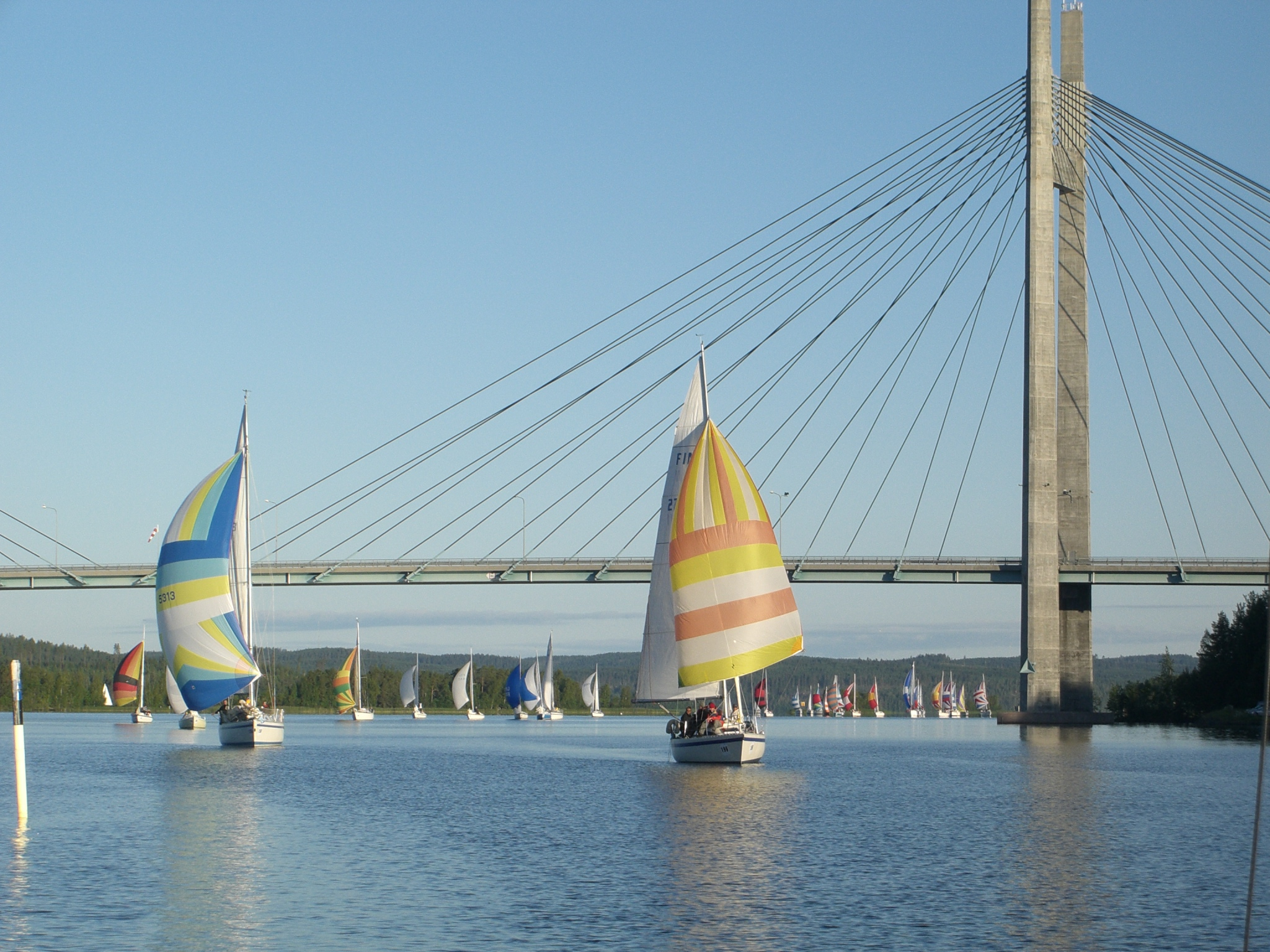
A yacht race on lake Päijänne in Jyväskylä, Finland

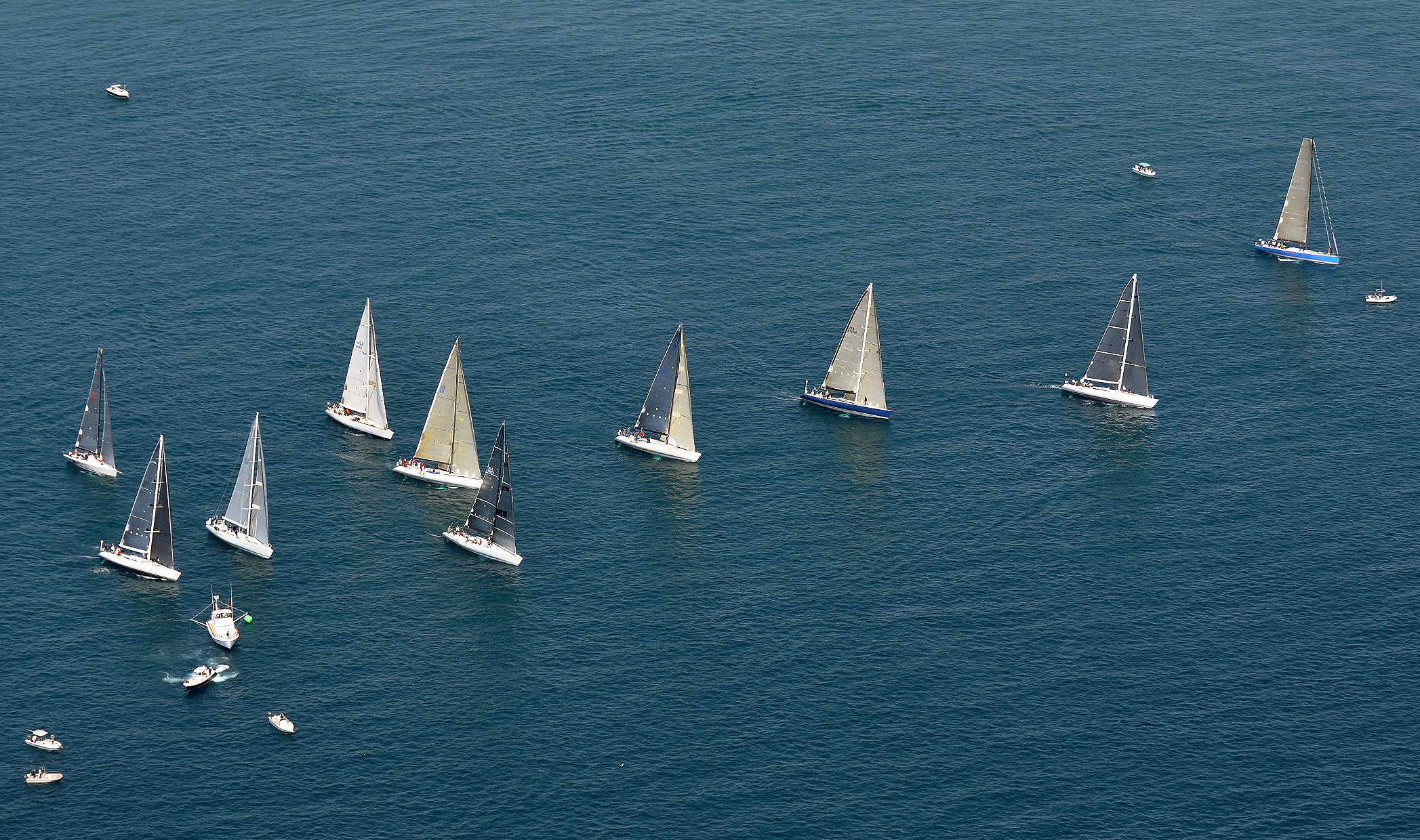
Cabo San Lucas Race Start 2013

=== History ===
The history of sailing dates back to prehistoric times but the racing of sailing boats is believed to have started in the Netherlands some time in the 17th century. Soon, in England, custom-built racing "yachts" began to emerge. In 1851, the Royal Yacht Squadron in Cowes challenged the American yacht America. The race took place in the Solent. The America won the race and took the trophy, the America's Cup, back to the US where, held by the New York Yacht Club, it remained until 1983. The cup was then lost to the Royal Perth Yacht Club of Australia, which entered the Australia II into the contest. Meanwhile, yacht racing continued to evolve, with the development of recognised classes of racing yachts, from small dinghies up to huge maxi yachts.

=== Inshore ===
Although there are many different types of racing vessels, they can generally be separated into the larger yachts, which are larger and contain facilities for extended voyages, and smaller harbour racing craft such as dinghies and skiffs. Smaller boats are not generally referred to as yachts, although all recreational boats (as opposed to commercial or military vessels) are yachts. These days, yacht racing is a common participant sport around the developed world, particularly where favorable wind conditions and access to reasonably sized bodies of water are available. Most yachting is conducted in salt water, but smaller craft can be raced on lakes and even large rivers.

=== Ocean ===
Larger yachts are also raced on harbours, but the most prestigious yacht races are point-to-point long-distance races on the open ocean. Bad weather makes even finishing such races a considerable test of equipment and willpower, and from time to time boats and sailors are lost at sea. The longest such events are "round-the-world" races which can take months to complete, but better-known are events such as the Fastnet race in the United Kingdom and the Sydney to Hobart Yacht Race along the east coast of Australia. Large races are usually organized with a first-past-the-post trophy (called "line honours") and under a handicap system that adjusts finishing times for the relative speeds of the boats' design, theoretically offering each entrant an equal chance.

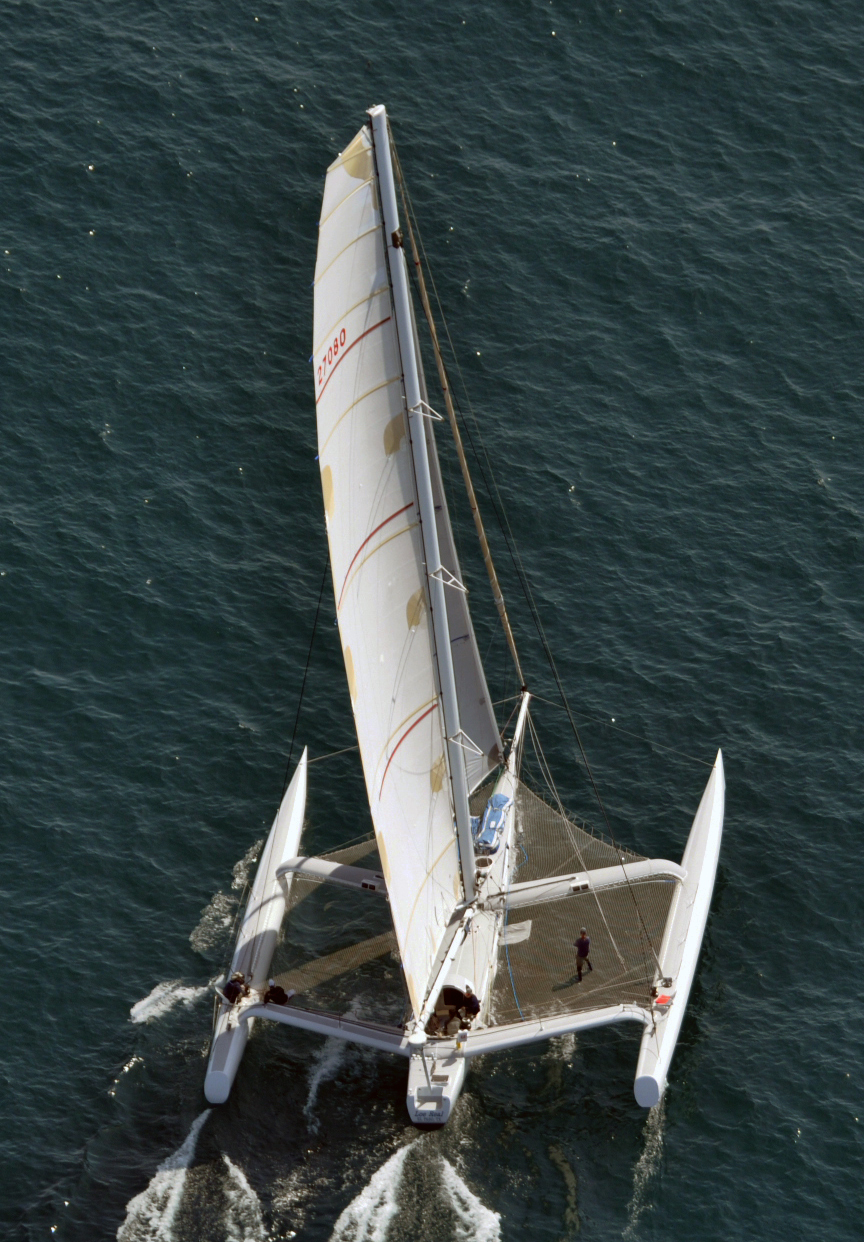
Loe Real 60-foot Water World Tri 2013

While sailing groups organize the most active and popular competitive yachting, other boating events are also held worldwide: speed motor boat racing; competitive canoeing, kayaking, and rowing; and navigational contests (generally a test of celestial and landmark-based navigation skills where GPS and other electronic navigation equipment is disallowed) are among the events which are organized around the world. Specialized yachts, such as hydrofoils, hovercraft, or personal watercraft also engage in competitions involving test of equipment and skill (usually, skill in maneuvering safely). All such events are part of the larger world of yachting, if they are done for recreational or sporting purposes.

== Cruising ==
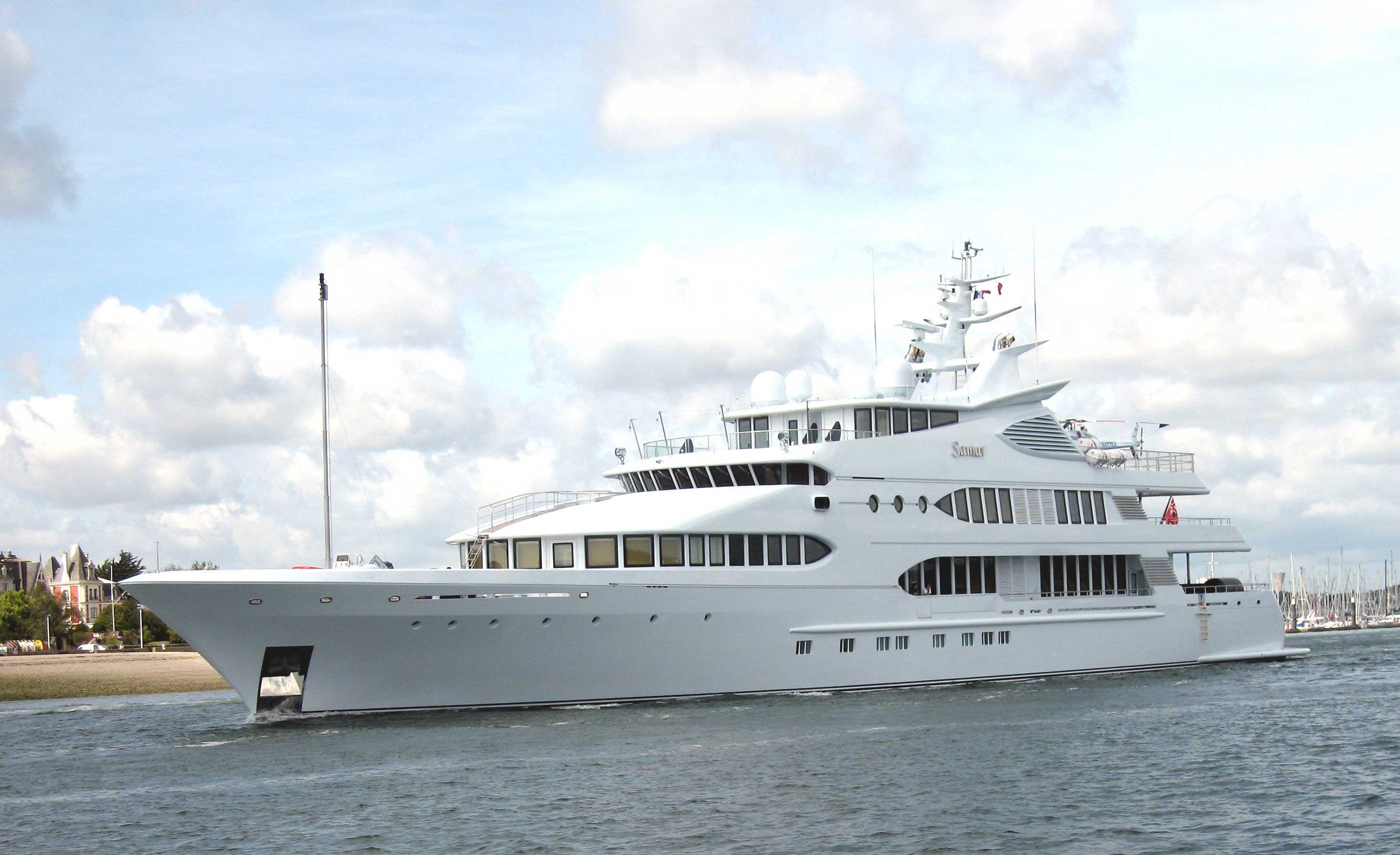
A yacht in Lorient, Bretagne, France

Cruising involves traveling on a boat, whether across a bay, on the Great Lakes (in the US) or from island to island in the South Pacific. Safe cruising across long distances requires a degree of self-sufficiency and a wide range of skills beyond handling the boat. Knowledge of topics such as navigation, meteorology, mechanical and electrical systems, radio, first aid, sea survival, nutrition and more are needed and can be life saving when cruising to distant shores. In the US, the United States Power Squadrons offer courses and certifications in these skills. In the UK, a system of certification is run by the Royal Yachting Association. Similar systems are offered by organizations in other countries and typically include a range of courses, both theoretical and practical.

== Fishing ==
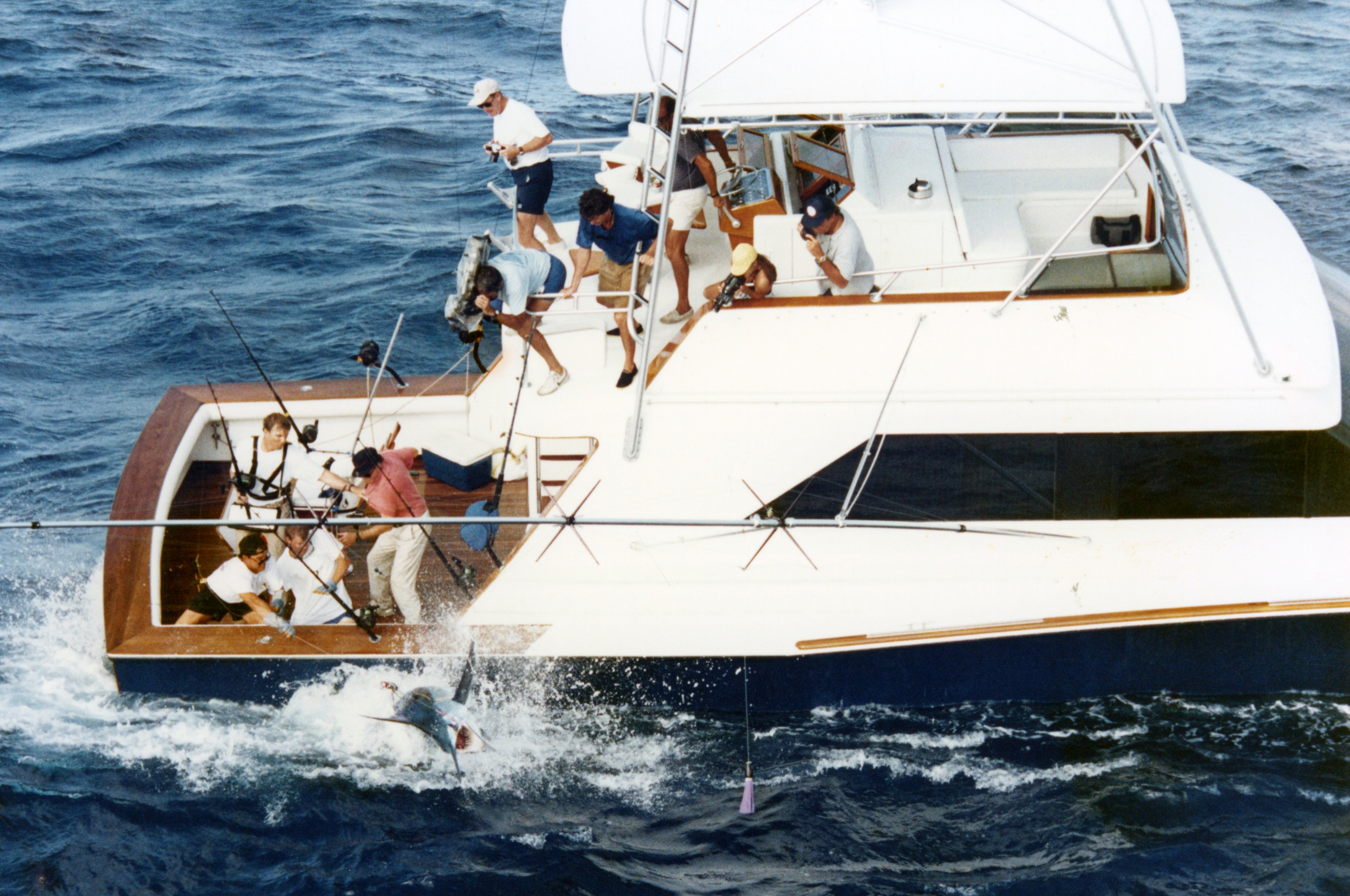
Billfishing aboard a small yacht

Offshore fishing in green and blue waters generally require sturdier, more seaworthy vessels that can handle stronger waves and more unpredictable weather conditions, and these vessels are typically larger, heavier and need to be moored in a marina. Most offshore recreational fishermen charter boats rather than own them, and those demanding more luxury go yacht charter. Fishing while yachting is often a pastime of the affluent upper and upper middle classes, and there is a demand for chartered yacht with experienced crew and equipped and catered for prestige and enjoyment.

== See also ==
- Boating
- Classic Boat Museum
- Cruising (maritime)
- Superyacht
- Sailing
- Yacht charter
- Yacht club
- Yacht racing
- Yacht rock
