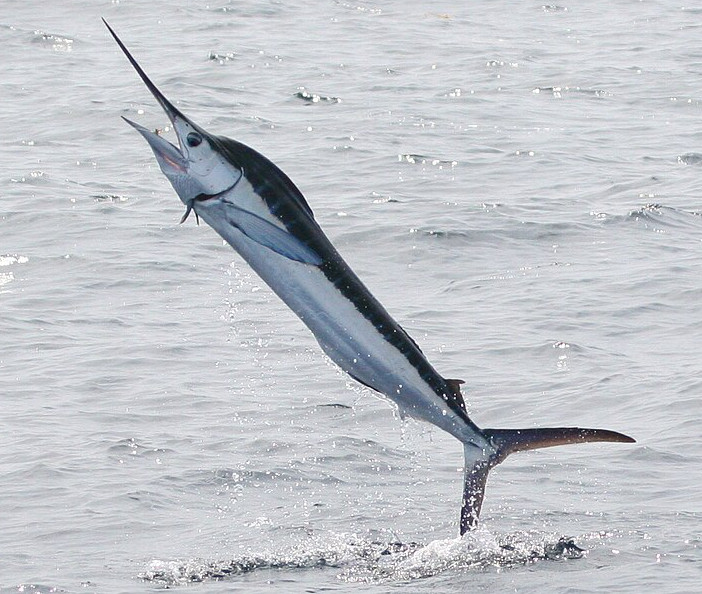
- White marlin (K. albida)

Scientific classification
- Domain: Eukaryota
- Kingdom: Animalia
- Phylum: Chordata
- Class: Actinopterygii
- Order: Carangiformes
- Suborder: Menoidei
- Superfamily: Xiphioidea
- Family: Istiophoridae
- Genus: Kajikia; Hirasaka & H. Nakamura, 1947

Type species
- Istiophorus formosanus Hirasaka & H. Nakamura, 1947

= Kajikia =

Genus of ray-finned fishes

Kajikia is a genus of billfishes found in all subtropical oceans.

== Species ==
The recognized species in this genus are:

- Kajikia albida (Poey, 1860) (white marlin)
- Kajikia audax (Philippi {Krumweide}, 1887) (striped marlin)
