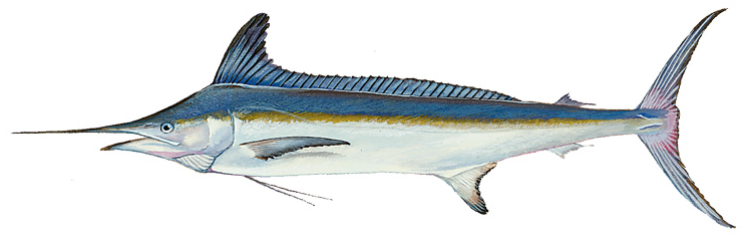

Conservation status
- Data Deficient (IUCN 3.1)

Scientific classification
- Kingdom: Animalia
- Phylum: Chordata
- Class: Actinopterygii
- Division: Teleostei
- Order: Carangiformes
- Family: Istiophoridae
- Genus: Tetrapturus
- Species: T. georgii

Binomial name
- Tetrapturus georgii R. T. Lowe, 1841

= Roundscale spearfish =

Tetrapturus georgii

The roundscale spearfish (Tetrapturus georgii) is an Istiophoridae species of marlin living in the epipelagic zone of the Atlantic Ocean. It has long been misidentified as white marlin but can be differentiated thanks to their scale shapes that gives its name. Not much is known about this species. It could reach a length of 160 cm and 21.5 kg and has no conservation status yet due to a lack of data.

== Taxonomy and naming ==
=== Taxonomy ===
The roundscale spearfish, described in 1841 by Lowe, is a Teleostei fish of the order of the Carangiformes (jacks) and of the family of Istiophoridae (Billfishes). With T. angustirostris, T. belone, and T. pfluegeri, T. georgii share the genus Tetrapturus meaning "four fins" in Greek.

=== Misidentification ===
Tetrapturus georgii have long been misidentified with the white marlin previously Tetrapturus albicans. But in 2006, genetic discoveries have led to a genus change for the white marlin to Kajikia albida and to a validation of the species Tetrapturus georgii thanks to molecular and morphological evidence. The identification of the species can be done with the scale shape or with genetic analysis. This identification problem for years led to a miscounting of both species population and is one of the reason for a bad population assessment. With lacking data for a proper population assessment simulation, an uncertainty hangs over the needed conservation status and management. However the population trends suggest a more worrying situation than it was previously suggested.

== Biology ==
=== Morphology description ===
Tetrapturus georgii has a robust and not very compressed body. Tetrapturus species are not known to show a sexual dimorphism in morphological features and color pattern. For T. georgii as well, females (150 cm body length; and 20 kg body weight) are mostly the same dimension as the males (160 cm body length and 21.5 kg body weight)

Tetrapturus georgii is characterized by its moderately long, slender rostrum, rounded in cross section (length usually at least equal to head). Its body is slim, and it has a moderate hump on the nape. It is dark blue above, coppery on the sides and silver below colors and may display iridescent bars on body. The branchiostegal membranes on the sides of its head are completely united but free from the isthmus. The jaws and palate have small, file-like teeth. It has two dark blue dorsal fins. The first is higher at the front, with a rounded lobe, extending from the head to just before the second dorsal fin which is smaller. Two anal fins are present, the first being high and rounded, and the second like the second dorsal fin. The pectoral fins are long, almost equal to the pelvic fins. The caudal peduncle has keels on each side. The lateral line is simple. The scales on the sides of the body are soft, while those on the dorsal and ventral parts are stiff. The color of the rostrum may not have bars on the body, and the first dorsal fin is often unspotted. Its flesh is distinctly redder than that of T. belone and more like Kajikia albidia.

As said before, the identification between T. georgii and Kajikia albida (white marlin) can be done thanks to a close scale shape examination. Roundscale spearfish are described as having more soft, rounded anteriorly scales with a few large posterior points. White marlin scales, on the other hand, are more rigid pointed anteriorly as well as posteriorly. The scales used are often arbitrarily sampled on the mid-body of the animal. Another way of identification between the two species, without doing a genetic test, is by measuring the distance between the anal opening and the anal fin. In roundscale spearfish, the anal opening is further away from the anal fin (greater than half the length of the anal fin) than it is for the white marlin.

=== Physiology ===
Tetrapturus georgii has asymmetrical gonads and a presence of swim bladder, consisting of many small bubble-shaped chambers essential for buoyancy regulation.

== Ecology ==
=== Distribution ===
Tetrapturus georgii is endemic to the Atlantic Ocean. Most specimens of this species are found in Madeira, Sicily, the Straits of Gibraltar, and the adjacent Atlantic Ocean off southern Portugal. But observations have been made all around the Atlantic Ocean from North to South and East to West. It's not unusual for them to make long migrations across the ocean. The nursery areas for larval and juveniles stages remain unknown.

=== Diet ===
Feeding habits of Tetrapturus georgii have not been reported in scientific literature. But the same way as their related cousins, the roundscale spearfish probably feed on schooling fishes, bony fishes, squid, octopuses and cuttlefishes. The billfishes are high trophic level predators.

Tetrapturus georgii could be a host of the parasite Capsala laevis.

=== Behavior ===
Their rostrum and powerful speed burst is useful to stun and catch prey. Tetrapturus georgii spends more than 60% of its time at depths of less than 10m and is thus an epi-pelagic fish.

Little is known about Tetrapturus behaviors. This lonely migratory predators, sometimes meet in high prey density areas. But much of the available research focuses on individual movements and habitat use, rather than exploring group dynamics. The lack of comprehensive data on billfish species, combined with the challenges of studying these elusive marine animals, lead to poor social structure and behavioral understanding.

=== Life cycle ===
Very little is known on its reproductive biology, mating display and sexual behavior. Tetrapturus georgii is a dioecious species likely laying eggs in batches in tropical regions. So far, only a single juvenile and a single egg are known to scientific literature, that were both collected each in early April 2017 and early April 2023, respectively, during two German-led cruises in the Sargasso Sea, south of Bermuda. The pelagic eggs contain oil droplets and hatch into planktonic larvae, then fastly growing to become juveniles. The maximum lifespan could be between 8 and 15 years according to their closest relatives.

== Relation to humans ==
=== Fisheries and stock assessement ===
Tetrapturus georgii and other billfishes are not targeted by commercial fisheries but represents an important bycatch in longline tuna and swordfish fisheries. As T. georgii has long been misidentified as white marlin, no specific total landings or stock assessment are existing. According to a study, about 30% of the white marlin landings registered should have been identified as roundscale spearfishes. The white marlin benefits from a long landings historical record. With a maximum of 4900mt in 1965, white marlin (and thus roundscale spearfish) landings have decreased to 350mt in 2011. This diminution is partially due to the conservation recommendations of the international commission for tune conservation (ICCAT) to release alive marlins. But since then, total landings have difficulties in staying below the total allowed catch (TAC) of 400mt putting at risk the stock recovery. The projections are full of uncertainty because of bad fish mortality assessment due to an inadequate reporting of discards as well as a lack of data from recreational fisheries. In addition, a stock assessment of two species at the same time may be detrimental and hide strong threats to one or both of them.

Some gear selectivity improvement such as circle hooks instead of j-hooks seems promising for a billfish bycatch reduction. Combine with a respect of TAC, size limitation and quick release, it could represent some practical solution for a reduced human footprint.

By only accounting for 5% of the total landing, recreational fisheries represents a multimilliard dollar sector in developed countries targeting white marlin and roundscale spearfish seamlessly. But despite a high alive release, the energy expenditure and the physiological stress resulting from capture and handling lead to a possible post-release mortality of about 20%. With more than 10,000 catches per year just in the US, this represent a real impact not enough documented.

All this make the roundscale spearfish's situation seem precarious, even though it has not been evaluated and assessed yet.
