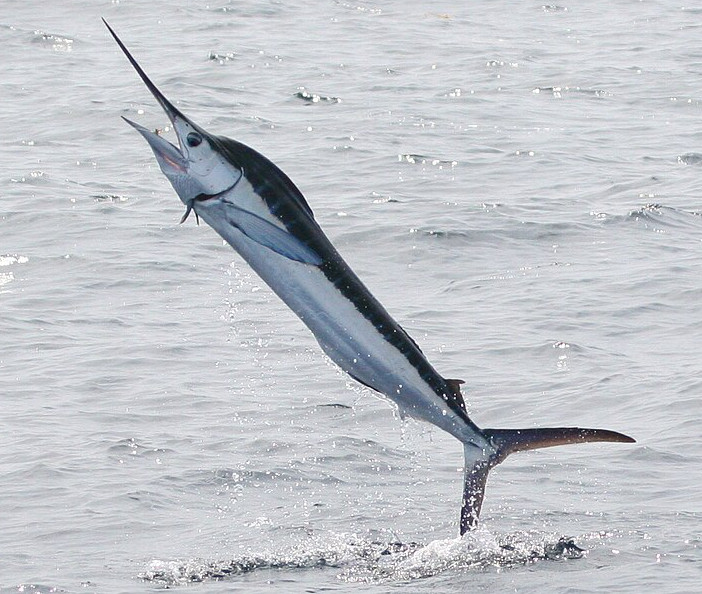

Conservation status
- Least Concern (IUCN 3.1)

Scientific classification
- Kingdom: Animalia
- Phylum: Chordata
- Class: Actinopterygii
- Division: Teleostei
- Order: Carangiformes
- Family: Istiophoridae
- Genus: Kajikia
- Species: K. albida

Binomial name
- Kajikia albida (Poey, 1860)

Synonyms
- Lamontella albida (Poey, 1860); Makaira albida (Poey, 1860); Tetrapterus albidus Poey, 1860; Tetrapturus lessonae Canestrini, 1861; Makaira lessonae (Canestrini, 1861)

= White marlin =

Species of fish

The white marlin (Kajikia albida), also known as Atlantic white marlin, marlin, skilligalee, is a species of billfish that lives in the epipelagic zone of the tropical and subtropical Atlantic Ocean. They are found between the latitudes of 45° N and 45° S in waters deeper than 100 m (330 ft). Even though white marlin are found in bodies of water that are deeper than 100 m they tend to stay near the surface. White marlin have been found near banks, shoals, and canyons, but they are not limited to those locations. They prefer warm surface temperatures greater than 22 °C (72 °F).

== Identification ==
White marlin are commonly misidentified as roundscale spearfish (Tetrapturus georgii). This likely caused a miscount of the population size of white marlin and roundscale spearfish before they were determined genetically different in 2001. Differentiation between the two species can be done with close external examination. As described in the name, roundscale spearfish have a broadband, round anterior end of their scales. White marlin scales are more rigid and rounded on the posterior region of the scale. Another way to identify between the two species without doing a genetic test is by looking at the distance between the anal opening and the anal fin. In roundscale spearfish, the anal opening is further way from the anal fin (greater than half the length of the anal fin) than it is in the white marlin.

== Taxonomy and evolution ==
In 1860, Felipe Poey gave the white marlin the name Tetrapturus albidus. This classification places the species in the same genus as shortbill spearfish, Mediterranean spearfish, roundscale spearfish, and longbill spearfish. Researchers have identified fossils from the genus Tetrapturus dating back to the Langhian Age 15 million years ago (Mya). Extinct ancestors, such as species from the genus Palaeorhynchus date to as early as 56 Mya.

Tetrapturus albidus was the accepted name for white marlin until 2006. At this time, Collette and his colleagues' genetic testing suggested that white marlin and Indo-Pacific striped marlin should be classified in the genus Kajikia. Today, Kajikia albida and its close relative Kajikia audax (striped marlin) have been scientifically determined to be genetically distinct from the species in the genus Tetrapturus.

== Appearance and anatomy ==
White marlin are mid-sized billfish with a bill that is round in cross section, and distinctly forked caudal fin. Their body structure is designed for fast swimming with a long, streamlined appearance. The length of K. albida is measured from the lower jaw to the fork of the tail (lower-jaw fork length; LJFL). The largest white marlin reported was 2.8 m (9.2 ft) LJFL and weighed over 82 kg (181 lb). The coloring of white marlin is used as countershading, with a dark blue dorsal side and a dirty white ventral side. Though all white marlin have the same coloring pattern, they are sexually dimorphic, with the females usually larger. One of the most noticeable features of white marlin is the dorsal fin, which extends along the majority of the dorsal portion of its body. The dorsal fin consists of typically 28 to 46 rays. These rays make up a fin tall and rounded in the anterior, but quickly levels off and then decreases as it extends to the posterior. Behind the large primary dorsal fin is the secondary dorsal fin, which is made up of five to six rays. White marlin have a set of similar pectoral fins and pelvic fins. These two sets of fin are rounded and wide at the tip. They also have two anal fins which can be used for identification between species. The lateral line on this species is prominent, with a hump above the pectoral fin and extends the length of the fish toward the caudal fin.

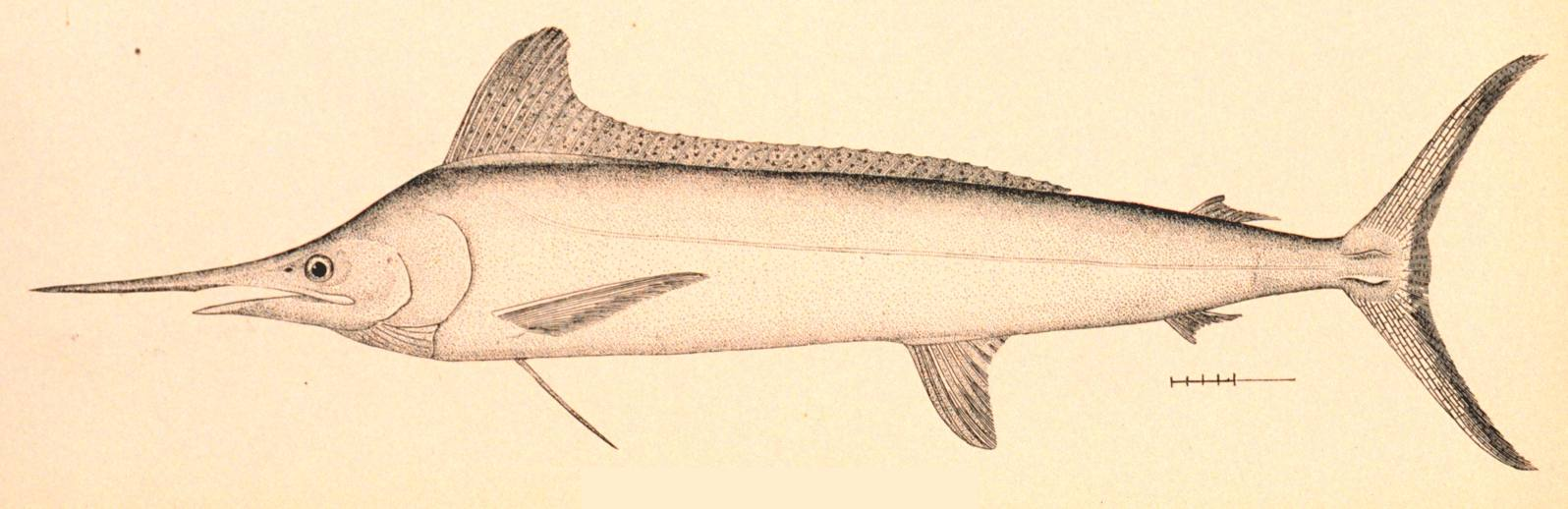
Illustration of white marlin

Internally, white marlin do not have a swim bladder, but instead have small, bubble-shaped chambers that act as a swim bladder. Similarly to most vertebrates, they have symmetrical gonads. Unlike other marine fish, white marlin do not have gill rakers which are involved in suspension feeding. White marlin do have small but sharp teeth that are used when eating fish and cephalopods.

== Distribution ==
White marlin are found throughout warmer waters of the Atlantic between 45°N to 45°S, it is found in the Gulf of Mexico, Caribbean Sea, and Mediterranean Sea, although records from the Mediterranean Sea and from as far north as Brittany, France, appear to refer to vagrants.

== Feeding and diet ==
White marlin are near the top of the food chain and will consume any prey they can find that is manageable for their size. Schooling flyingfish, small tuna, mahi-mahi (dolphinfish, dorado), and squid are the preferred prey of white marlin. They sometime forage for food with help of other predators. White marlin usually keep to themselves, but associate with other apex predators to increase the efficiency of foraging. They also obtain food is by diving down in a V- or U-shaped parabola to about 200 m in search of food that is not at the surface. To survive in these lower temperatures and darker environments, white marlin have larger eyes and a way to selectively warm their eye and brain tissue.

== Lifecycle and migration ==
The lifecycle of K. albida begins with a large spawning in warm tropical waters near the equator. Each female can lay 190,000 to 586,000 eggs. The Gulf of Mexico, Mona Passage, Southwest Bermuda, and northwest Grand Bahama Island are a few locations that have been located as prime spawning ground for white marlin. They return to the warm, shallow, equatorial waters each year to spawn. Growth of white marlin is very rapid, with males reaching sexual maturity at only 153.2 cm LJFL and females becoming sexually mature at 189.9 cm LJFL. The lifespan of white marlin has been identified as 15 or more years.

White marlin are ram ventilators, which means they have to be constantly moving to breathe. Many have made long transatlantic journeys. One white marlin resurfaced 6,517 km (4,083 miles) from where it was tagged 474 days later.

== Fishing and conservation ==
Prior to 2001, roundscale spearfish and white marlin were identified as the same species. Researchers from Nova Southeastern University's Guy Harvey Research Institute, Dania Beach, Florida, first discovered that these two species were significantly different in 2001 through genetic tests. Before this discovery. the two species made up a population that was of least concern to the IUCN. Placement into the endangered species list was not established until 2007, when the population numbers had already dropped below easily recoverable levels.

White marlin fishing is a multimillion-dollar organization in well-developed countries. Restrictions are in place to limit the size of fish that can be taken, but the angling process can be devastating to fish. The time spent on the hook, outside handling, dehooking, and releasing a white marlin exhaust enough energy that up to 32% of the time, the marlin cannot maintain buoyancy in the water. When fishing for any billfish, use of a circle hook, which can be dehooked more quickly than other hooks, is recommended. In the U.S. Atlantic, Gulf of Mexico, and Caribbean waters, the fish is required by federal regulations to be kept in the water, boatside, to maximize its chances of surviving after release. Research indicates that removing a billfish from the water may increase their risk of death after release by ~30 percent (research ongoing).

About 90% of the annual catch is caught accidentally in bycatch from fishing around the world. Many billfish are caught in gillnets or on longline hooks that were meant to catch other fish species. Since these hooks and nets are set for long periods of time, white marlin become food to sharks, pilot whales, and killer whales. In response to the decrease in white marlin, marine life agencies have developed acts and plans such as the Atlantic Tunas Conservation Act and the Magnuson-Stevens Fishery Conservation and Management Act to protect vulnerable species. The U.S. Fishery Management plan for the Atlantic billfish has, as an objective, to educate and increase knowledge about billfish and their roles in the ecosystem. In the United States, billfishing is reserved for recreational fishing only.

== Additional information ==
Ocean City, Maryland, is known as the White Marlin Capital of the World. The town hosts the annual White Marlin Open, a big-game tournament which attracts anglers from all over the world, and which frequently pays out over a million dollars to the winning team. The tournament encourages tag-and-release (nonlethal) handling of the fish, although winning marlin are often brought back to the marina for verification of the size and weight. The 2010 White Marlin Open was held at Harbour Island Marina on 14th Street and the Bay.

The 2016 White Marlin Open created controversy when the only fish that met the minimum weight requirement of 70 lb, was disqualified when the crew of the winning boat, Kallianassa, was deemed to have failed a polygraph which implied that tournament rules were broken during the clash. The boat's owner, Phillip G. Heasley, was denied the $2.8 million of prize money.
