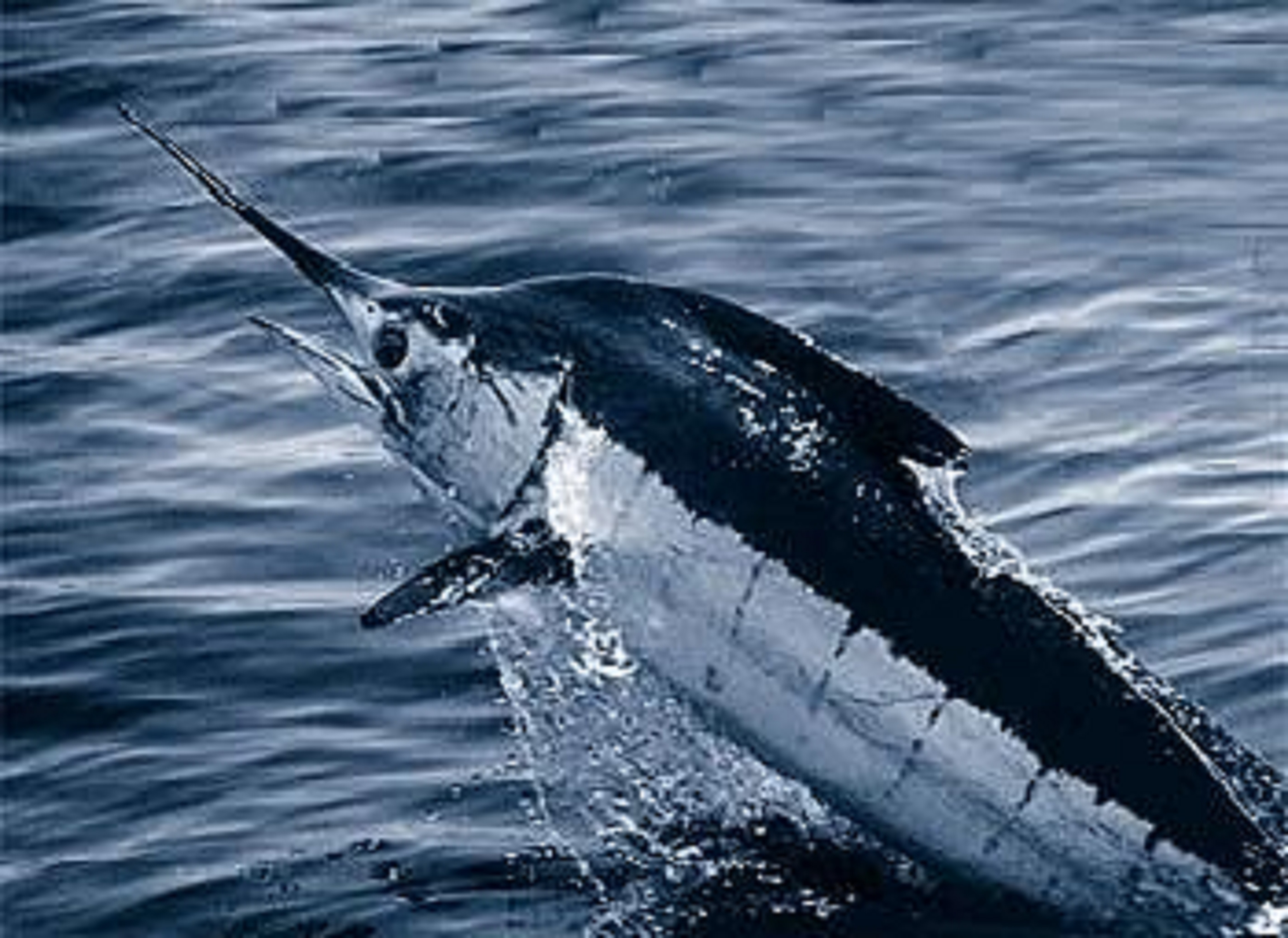
- Atlantic blue marlin (Makaira nigricans)

Scientific classification
- Kingdom: Animalia
- Phylum: Chordata
- Class: Actinopterygii
- Division: Teleostei
- Order: Carangiformes
- Suborder: Menoidei
- Superfamily: Xiphioidea
- Family: Istiophoridae; Rafinesque, 1810

Type genus
- Istiophorus Lacépède, 1801

Genera
- Istiompax; Istiophorus; Kajikia; Makaira; Tetrapturus

= Marlin =

Marlin Temporal range: Early Miocene to present

Family of fish

Marlins are fish from the family Istiophoridae, which includes between 9 and 11 species, depending on the taxonomic authority.

== Name ==
The family's common name is thought to derive from their resemblance to a sailor's marlinspike.

== Taxonomy ==
The family name Istiophoridae comes from the genus Istiophorus which first placed the species Istiophorus platypterus by George Kearsley Shaw in 1792 from the Greek word ἱστίον istion meaning "sail" that describes the shape of the species's dorsal fins.

== Family description ==
Marlins have elongated bodies, a spear-like snout or bill, and a long, rigid dorsal fin which extends forward to form a crest.

Marlins, an apex predator, are among the fastest marine swimmers. However, greatly exaggerated speeds are often claimed in popular literature, based on unreliable or outdated reports.

The larger species include the Atlantic blue marlin, Makaira nigricans, which can reach 5 m (16 ft) in length and 820 kg (1,810 lb) in weight and the black marlin, Istiompax indica, which can reach in excess of 5 m (16 ft) in length and 670 kg (1,480 lb) in weight. They are popular sporting fish in tropical areas. The Atlantic blue marlin and the white marlin are endangered due to overfishing.

Marlins can change colour, lighting up their stripes just before attacking prey.

== Classification ==
The marlins are Istiophoriform fish, most closely related to the swordfish (which itself is the sole member of the family Xiphiidae). The carangiformes are believed to be the second-closest clade to marlins. Although previously thought to be closely related to Scombridae, genetic analysis only shows a slight relationship.

=== Extant genera ===
Istiophoriform genera and species
Image	Genus	Living species	Common name
black marlin	Istiompax (Whitley, 1931)	Istiompax indica	black marlin
Atlantic sailfish	Istiophorus (Lacépède, 1801)	I. albicans	Atlantic sailfish
Atlantic sailfish	Istiophorus (Lacépède, 1801)	I. platypterus	Indo-Pacific sailfish
Atlantic blue	Makaira (Lacépède, 1802)	Makaira nigricans (Lacepède, 1802)	Atlantic blue marlin
Atlantic blue	Makaira (Lacépède, 1802)	Makaira mazara (Jordan & Snyder, 1901)	Indo-Pacific blue marlin
white marlin	Kajikia (Hirasaka & H. Nakamura, 1947)	Kajikia albida (Poey, 1860)	white marlin
white marlin	Kajikia (Hirasaka & H. Nakamura, 1947)	Kajikia audax (Philippi (Krumweide), 1887)	striped marlin
longbill	Tetrapturus (Rafinesque, 1810)	Tetrapturus angustirostris (S. Tanaka (I), 1915)	shortbill spearfish
longbill	Tetrapturus (Rafinesque, 1810)	Tetrapturus belone (Rafinesque, 1810)	Mediterranean spearfish
longbill	Tetrapturus (Rafinesque, 1810)	Tetrapturus georgii (R.T. Lowe, 1841)	roundscale spearfish
longbill	Tetrapturus (Rafinesque, 1810)	Tetrapturus pfluegeri (C. R. Robins & de Sylva, 1963)	longbill spearfish

=== Fossil genera ===
Marlins have a continuous fossil record from the Miocene onwards, with the oldest uncontroversial fossil dated to 22 million years ago. It is thought that they probably evolved in the Paratethys Sea.

The following fossil genera are known:

- †Morgula Gracia et al., 2022
- †Pizzikoskerma Gracia, Villalobos-Segura, Ballen, Carnevale & Kriwet, 2024
- †Prototetrapturus Gracia et al., 2022
- †Sicophasma Gracia, Villalobos-Segura, Ballen, Carnevale & Kriwet, 2024
- †Spathochoira Gracia et al., 2022
- †Thalattorhynchus Schultz, 1987 (nomen dubium)

== Popular culture ==
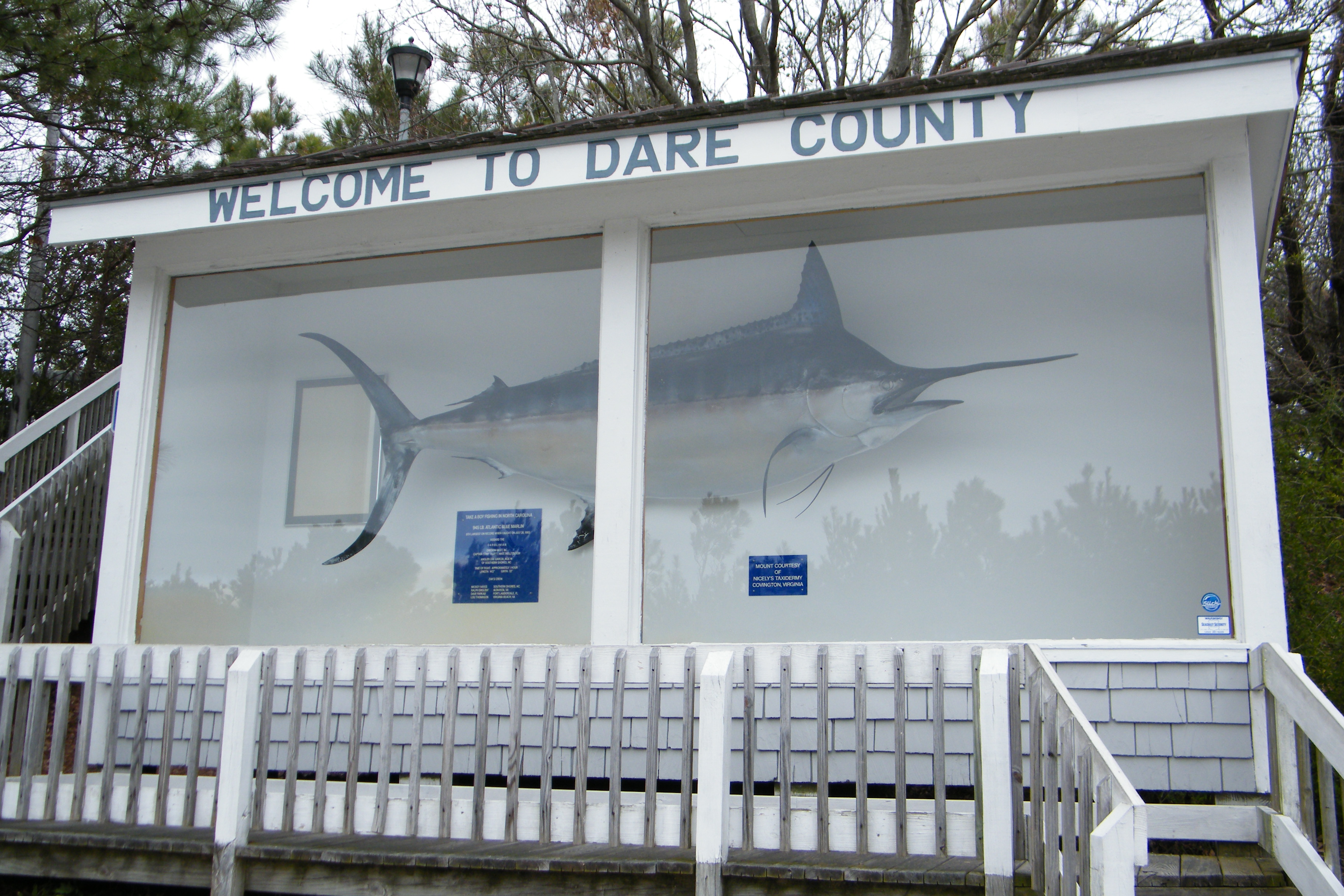
A taxidermied marlin greets visitors to Dare County, North Carolina.

In the Nobel Prize–winning author Ernest Hemingway's 1952 novel The Old Man and the Sea, the central character of the work is an aged Cuban fisherman who, after 84 days without success on the water, heads out to sea to break his run of bad luck. On the 85th day, Santiago, the old fisherman, hooks a resolute marlin; what follows is a great struggle between man, sea creature, and the elements.

Frederick Forsyth's story "The Emperor", in the collection No Comebacks, tells of a bank manager named Murgatroyd, who catches a marlin and is acknowledged by the islanders of Mauritius as a master fisherman.

A marlin features prominently in the last chapter and climactic scenes of Christina Stead's The Man Who Loved Children. Sam's friend Saul gives Sam a marlin, and Sam makes his children help him render the fish's fat.

The Miami Marlins, a professional baseball team based in Miami, Florida, are named after the fish. Their mascot is an anthropomorphic marlin named Billy.

In Finding Nemo, Nemo's father is a clownfish named Marlin.

== See also ==
- Marlin fishing
- Sailfish
