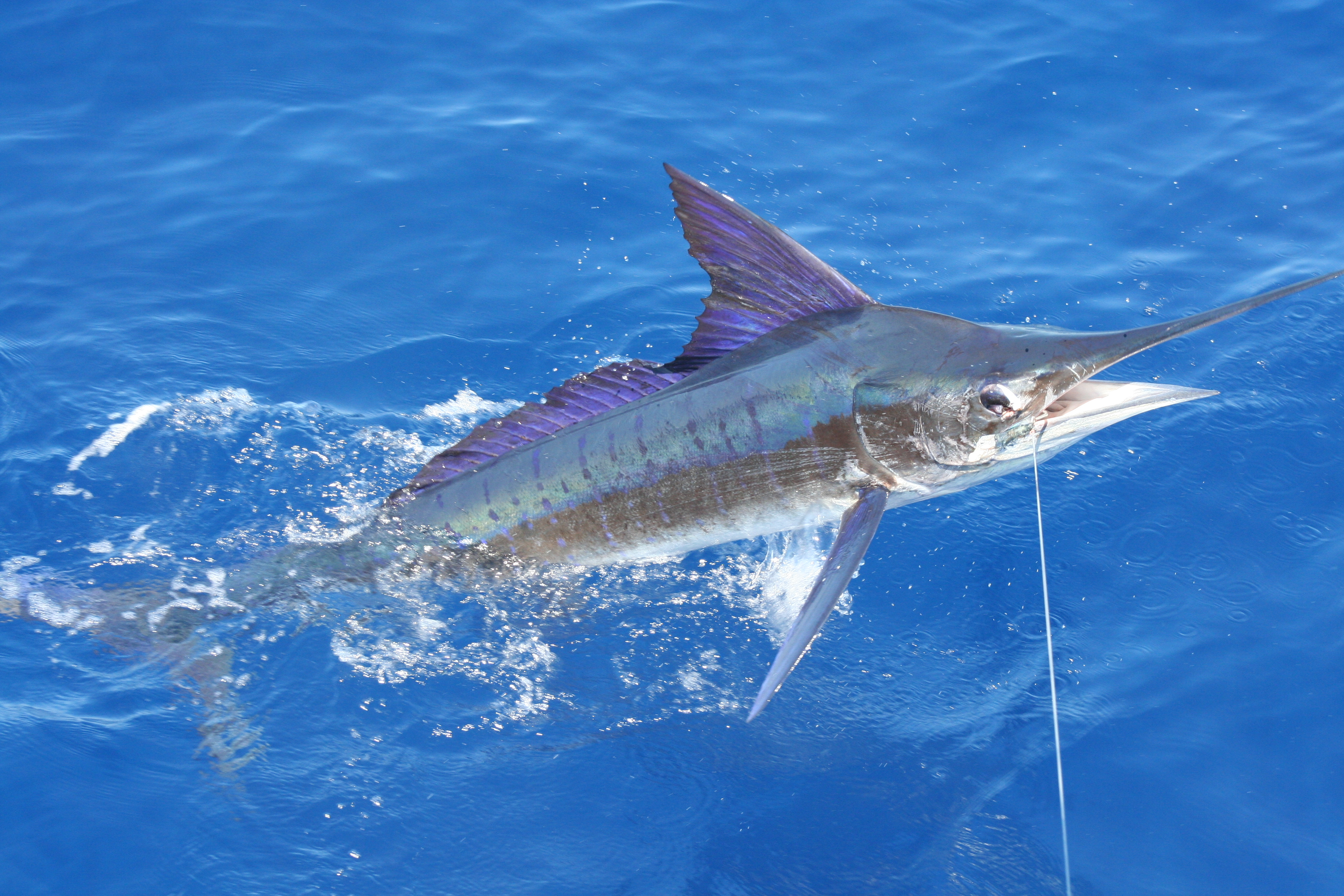

Conservation status
- Least Concern (IUCN 3.1)

Scientific classification
- Kingdom: Animalia
- Phylum: Chordata
- Class: Actinopterygii
- Order: Carangiformes
- Suborder: Menoidei
- Superfamily: Xiphioidea
- Family: Istiophoridae
- Genus: Kajikia
- Species: K. audax

Binomial name
- Kajikia audax (Philippi {Krumweide}, 1887)

Synonyms
- List: Histiophorus audax Philippi {Krumweide}, 1887; Istiophorus audax (Philippi {Krumweide}, 1887); Makaira audax (Philippi {Krumweide}, 1887); Marlina audax (Philippi {Krumweide}, 1887); Tetrapturus audax (Philippi {Krumweide}, 1887); Tetrapturus mitsukurii D. S. Jordan & Snyder, 1901; Kajikia mitsukurii (D. S. Jordan & Snyder, 1901); Makaira mitsukurii (D. S. Jordan & Snyder, 1901); Marlina mitsukurii (D. S. Jordan & Snyder, 1901); Makaira zelandica D. S. Jordan & Evermann, 1926; Makaira audax zelandica D. S. Jordan & Evermann, 1926; Marlina zelandica (D. S. Jordan & Evermann, 1926); Makaira grammatica D. S. Jordan & Evermann, 1926; Makaira holei D. S. Jordan & Evermann, 1926; Tetrapturus ectenes D. S. Jordan & Evermann, 1926; Kajikia formosana Hirasaka & H. Nakamura, 1947; Makaira formosana (Hirasaka & H. Nakamura, 1947); Tetrapturus tenuirostratus Deraniyagala, 1951; Makaira tenuirostratus (Deraniyagala, 1951); Marlina jauffreti J. L. B. Smith, 1956

= Striped marlin =

Species of fish

The striped marlin (Kajikia audax; see synonyms list for other scientific names) is a species of marlin found globally in tropical to temperate oceans not far from the surface. It is a desirable commercial and game fish, although conservation measures are in place to restrict its commercial landings. An epipelagic predator, it hunts during the day in the top 100 metres (330 ft) or so of the water column, often near the surface. One of its chief prey are sardines and other pelagic forage fish.

== Description ==
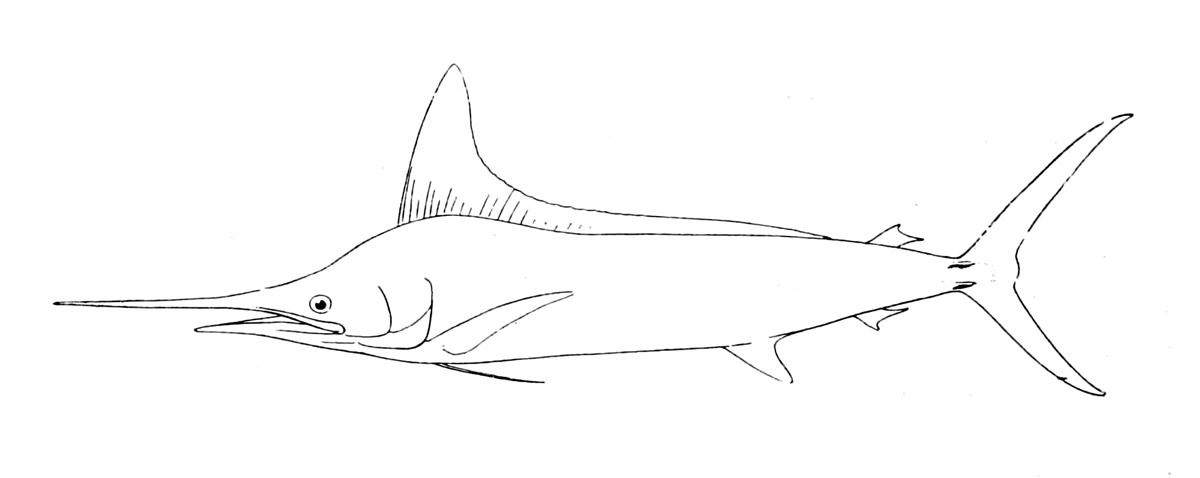
Drawing of a mature striped marlin

The striped marlin has a torpedo-like body, dark blue or black above and silvery-white below (countershading), with an average length of 2.9 m (9.5 ft), a maximum length of 4.2 m (13.8 ft), and weight up to 220 kg (490 lb). Its first dorsal fin is tall, of the same dimension or greater than its body depth, supported by 42–48 fin rays; the second is much smaller. It has around 12–20 pronounced bluish stripes on the sides of its body, which display even after death. Chromatophores, specialized pigmentation cells, contract or expand to enable the stripes to transform from blue-tinged to lavender when the fish is excited.

== Distribution and habitat ==
The striped marlin is epipelagic, residing away from shore but near the surface of the water. It is widely distributed around the world, and typically found in tropical and/or temperate water bodies. A study on its habitat preferences utilized opportunistic occurrence data to determine that the eastern Pacific Ocean is among the most ideal bodies of water for the species to inhabit. Additionally, it was discovered that its largest populations reside in water bodies with dissolved oxygen levels from 4.5 to 5.5 mL/L and a sea surface temperature between 20 and 28 °C (68 and 82 °F).

It was also determined that chlorophyll a levels are of the greatest importance when it comes to striped marlin distribution. High levels of chlorophyll a in a water body are indicative of high productivity, or nutrient level, within that aquatic ecosystem. An abundance of nutrients supports the growth of aquatic plants and algae, which contributes to the congregation of species that feed upon them, the striped marlin's principle prey.

The striped marlin has also demonstrated diel vertical migration patterns. A study observed that it tends to occupy deep regions of the water during the day, and typically gather near the surface at night. These patterns were prominent in all of the regions tested in the study, including waters off of Australia, New Zealand, Mexico, California, and Ecuador.

== Life cycle ==
The striped marlin can live up to 10 years, and reaches sexual maturity at the age of 1–2 years or 1.4 m (4.6 ft) for males and 1.5-2.5 years or 1.8 m (5.9 ft) for females. It spawns serially during its summer spawning season, which consists of anywhere from 4 to 41 spawning events, with females releasing batches of their up to 120 million eggs every few days.

== Diet ==
The striped marlin is a top predator, feeding mainly on a wide range of fish such as sardines, mackerel, small tuna, and cephalopods. One study off the coast of Mexico found that it preferred schooling fish such as the chub mackerel, Etrumeus sadina, and Sardinops caeruleus. It also feeds on some species of squid, most commonly the jumbo.

== Relation to humans ==
=== Landings ===
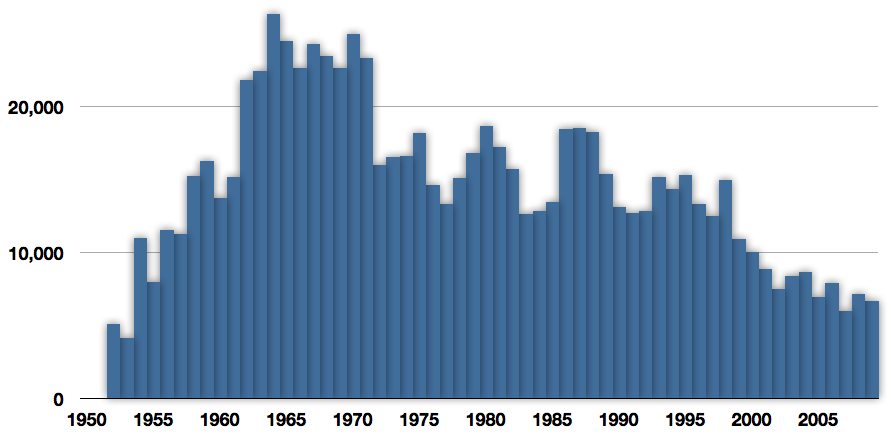
Landings of striped marlin in tonnes from 1950 to 2009

Landings of striped marlin peaked around 25,000 tonnes annually in the 1960s, but due to both overfishing and conservation efforts have returned to 1950s levels (of approximately 7,500 tonnes annually) in the first two decades of the 2000s.

=== Consumption ===
The striped marlin is consumed all around the world. Its firm meat can range from light pink to orangish red in color, and has a flavor comparable to but stronger than swordfish. It is generally enjoyed grilled; limited uses include smoking and raw consumption. Typical of other fish species, the striped marlin is an ideal source of omega-3 fatty acids and other essential vitamins and minerals. Also, it is a lean source of protein with minimal sodium and low levels of saturated fat, making it a practical choice for a nutritious meal.

=== Conservation ===
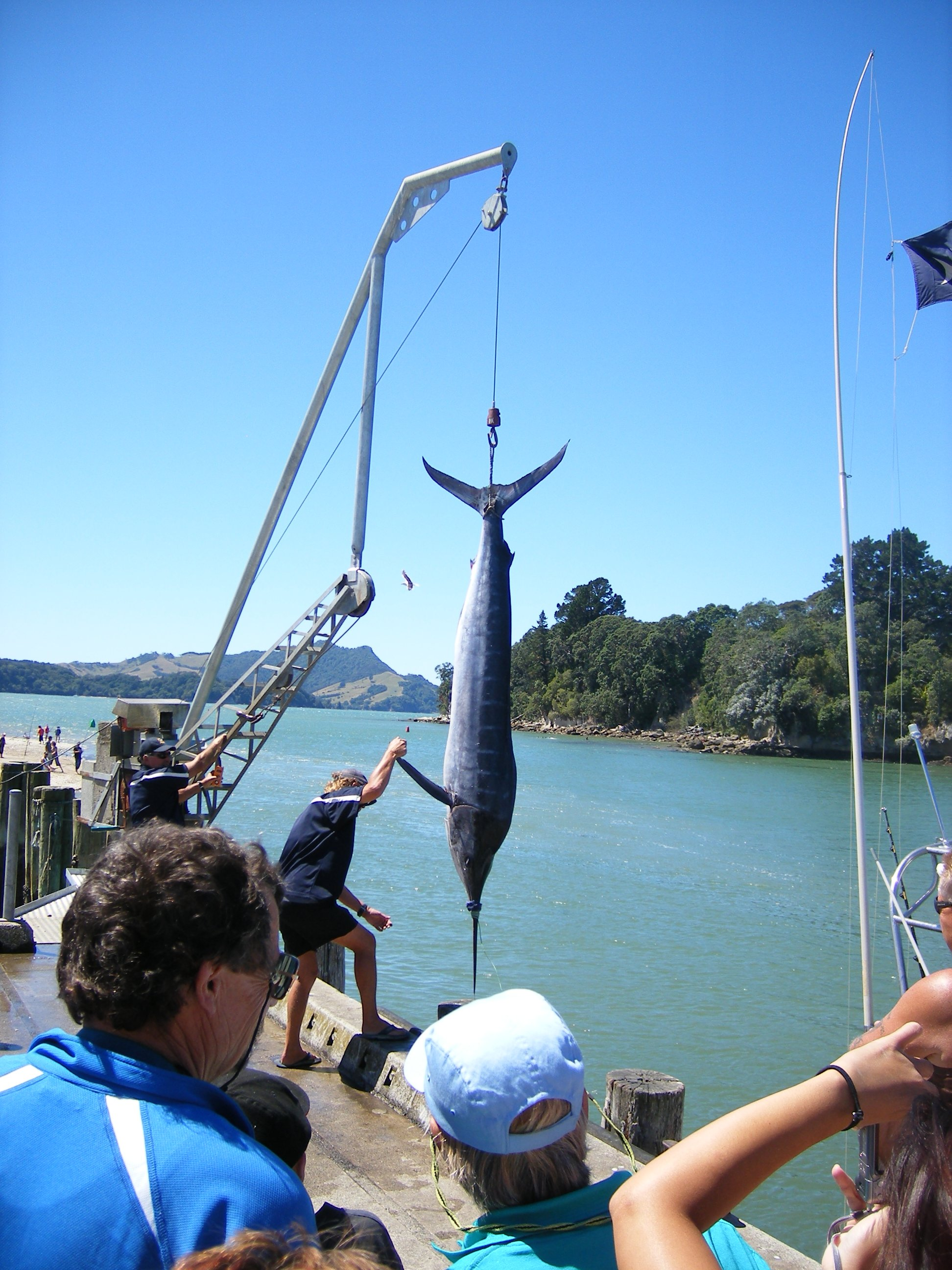
Striped marlin are protected from commercial landings in most U.S. waters by Congressional act, with additional wider conservation efforts managed by various international commissions and councils

Striped marlin are protected in the United States by The Billfish Conservation Act of 2012, which prohibits the distribution, sale, and possession with the intent to sell of billfish and/or billfish products. This highly restrictive law was enacted to help stem the significant downward trend in global billfish populations despite previously enacted management practices, likely due to generalized overfishing. Exemptions to this law on sale and custody with the intent to sell include billfish caught by U.S. fishing vessels and landed and retained in Hawaii or Pacific Insular Areas, and billfish landed by foreign vessels in the Pacific Insular Areas and exported to markets outside the U.S. or retained within Hawaii and the Pacific Insular Areas for local consumption.

In spite of the U.S.'s ban on commercial taking in most of its waters, the overfishing status of the striped marlin varies by geographical region. For instance, the striped marlin population is stable in the Eastern Pacific Ocean but is overfished in the Western and Central North Pacific Ocean. The international conservation efforts for the striped marlin are managed by the Inter-American Tropical Tuna Commission (IATTC) and the Western and Central Pacific Fisheries Commission (WCFPC), whereas the domestic U.S. conservation efforts are managed by the National Oceanic and Atmospheric Administration (NOAA) and the Western Pacific Fishery Management Council.

In 2010, Greenpeace International added the striped marlin to its "red seafood list", its list of commonly consumed fish which have a very high risk of being sourced from unsustainable fisheries."
