= Mark Cowley Lidwill =

Mark C Lidwill
- Born: 7 April 1878; Cheltenham, England
- Died: 4 July 1969 (aged 91)
- Education: Melbourne University; The Royal Australasian College of Physicians
- Known for: Inventor of the pacemaker
- Spouse: Constance Emily Jones

Mark Cowley Lidwill (1878–1969) was a medical pioneer in anaesthesiology and cardiology. Supported by physicist Edgar H. Booth, he invented the pacemaker.

== Early life ==
Born in Cheltenham, England on 7 April 1878, Lidwill emigrated with his parents to Melbourne, Australia, in 1894 and later graduated with honours in medicine from Melbourne University (MB 1902, BCh 1903), and as MD in 1905.

== Invention of pacemaker ==
Lidwill discovered that by using electricity he could stimulate muscles. He then went on to discover he could use electricity to set the pace of a sick heart.

In 1926, Lidwill was working at the Crown Street Women's Hospital in Sydney where he resuscitated a newborn baby with an electrical device. Lidwill's method was to put a needle into the heart to administer 16-volt impulses via the apparatus he had invented.

Lidwill’s knowledge and expertise extended not only to his invention of the cardiac pacemaker but to the design and manufacture in 1910 of his mechanical-anaesthesia apparatus, the “Lidwill Inter-tracheal Anaesthetic Machine”, which remained in use in operating theatres in hospitals throughout Australia for more than 30 years. Lidwill’s invention, the cardiac pacemaker, has saved innumerable human lives and has been listed by Australian Geographic amongst the top ten Australian inventions that changed the world.

== Honorary Fellowship ==
On 26 June 1954, the Faculty of Anaesthetists of the Royal Australasian College of Surgeons (RACS) awarded Lidwill an Honorary Fellowship.

== Namesake ==
The Victor Chang Cardiac Research Institute named one of five laboratories of their Molecular Cardiology and Biophysics Division as the Mark Cowley Lidwill Cardiac Electrophysiology Laboratory.

In 2007, Jamie Vandenberg established the Mark Cowley Lidwill Research Program in Cardiac Electrophysiology.

== World's first black marlin catch ==
On 8 February 1913, Lidwill became the first angler to catch a black marlin (Tetrapterus Indicus) with a rod and reel. The marlin, weighing approximately 32 kg (70 lbs), was caught from a small Port Stephens launch operated by Mr Dick Waterson of Nelson Bay after a fight of 12 minutes on 21 thread cuttyhunk linen line.

The fish was preserved in ice and shipped via the "SS Karuah" back to Sydney to be displayed at the George Street premises of tackle retailers "Eastaway Brothers". The marlin was subsequently donated to the Australian Museum, where it was skeletonised and put on display. The skeleton, now world-renowned, remains on permanent display in the Gallery of the Australian Museum in Sydney.

Lidwill was a pioneer fisherman and a leader in the ranks of the first rod and reel salt-water anglers. Lidwill skippered his self-designed sea cruiser "Vialeen" and was an avid angler for most of his life. In February 2003, the Newcastle and Port Stephens Game Fish Club dedicated the game fishing weigh station installed on the public wharf at Nelson Bay Port Stephens as the "Dr Mark Lidwill Game Fish Weighing Station".
