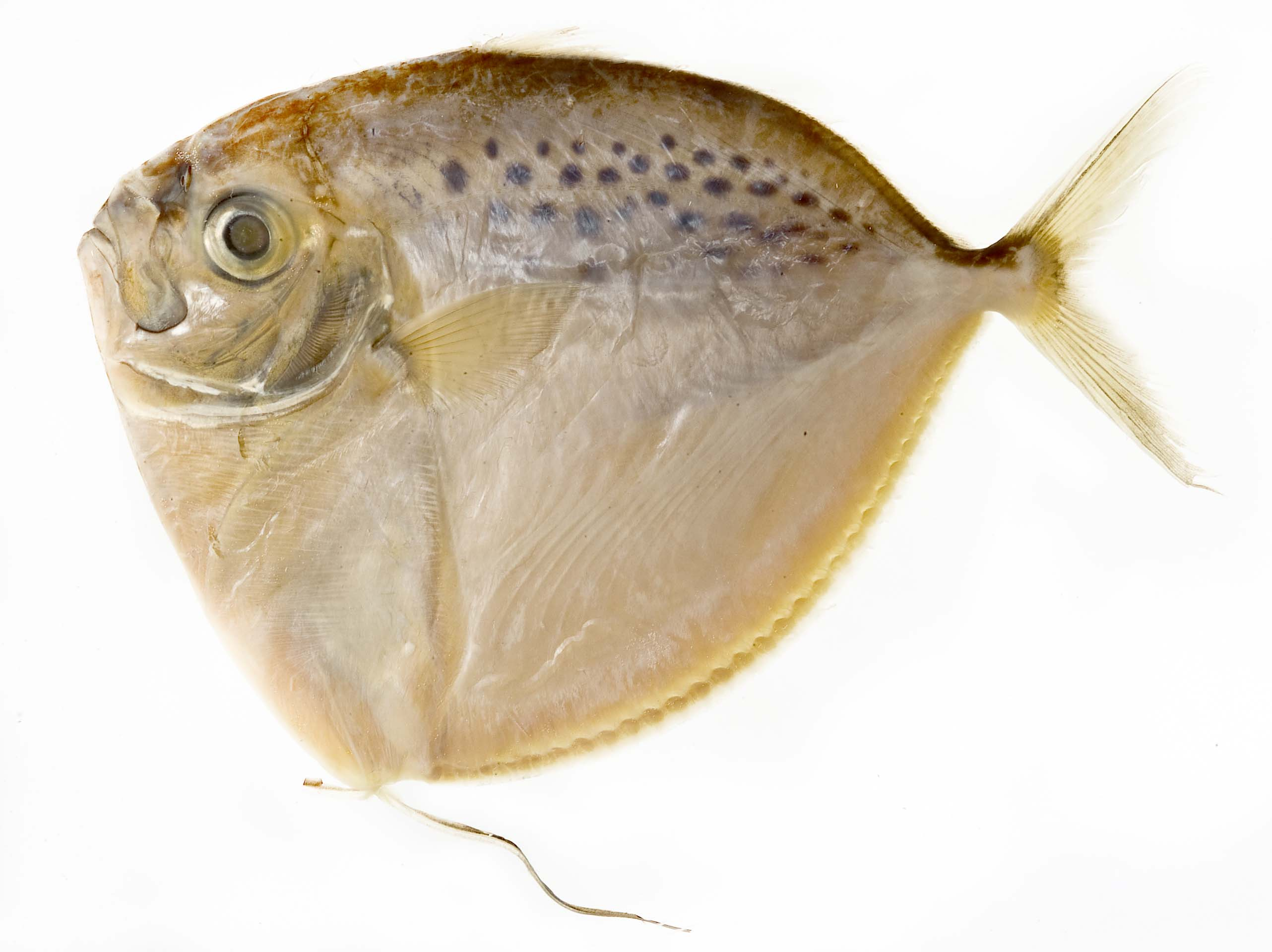
- Mene maculata

Scientific classification
- Kingdom: Animalia
- Phylum: Chordata
- Class: Actinopterygii
- Order: Carangiformes
- Suborder: Menoidei; Girard et al., 2020

Family
- Family Menidae Fitzinger 1873 (moonfishes); Family Xiphiidae Rafinesque 1815 (swordfishes); Family Istiophoridae Rafinesque 1815 (sailfishes, spearfish and marlins)

= Menoidei =

Menoidei Temporal range: Late Paleocene–present

Suborder of fishes

Menoidei is a suborder of ray-finned fishes belonging to the class Actinopterygii, a diverse group of vertebrates characterized by their bony skeletons. The suborder Menoidei includes the family Menidae, family Xiphiidae and family Istiophoridae.

Members of this suborder are aquatic and exhibit a wide range of adaptations to marine environments.

== Taxonomy ==
Suborder Menoidei

- Family Menidae Fitzinger 1873 (moonfishes)
- Superfamily Xiphioidea
  - Family Xiphiidae Rafinesque 1815 (swordfishes)
  - Family Istiophoridae Rafinesque 1815 (sailfishes, spearfish and marlins)
  - Family †Palaeorhynchidae Günther, 1880
  - Family †Blochiidae Bleeker, 1859
  - Family †Hemingwayidae Sytchevskaya & Prokofiev, 2002

== See also ==
- Dolphinfishes
- Roosterfish
- Rachycentron
