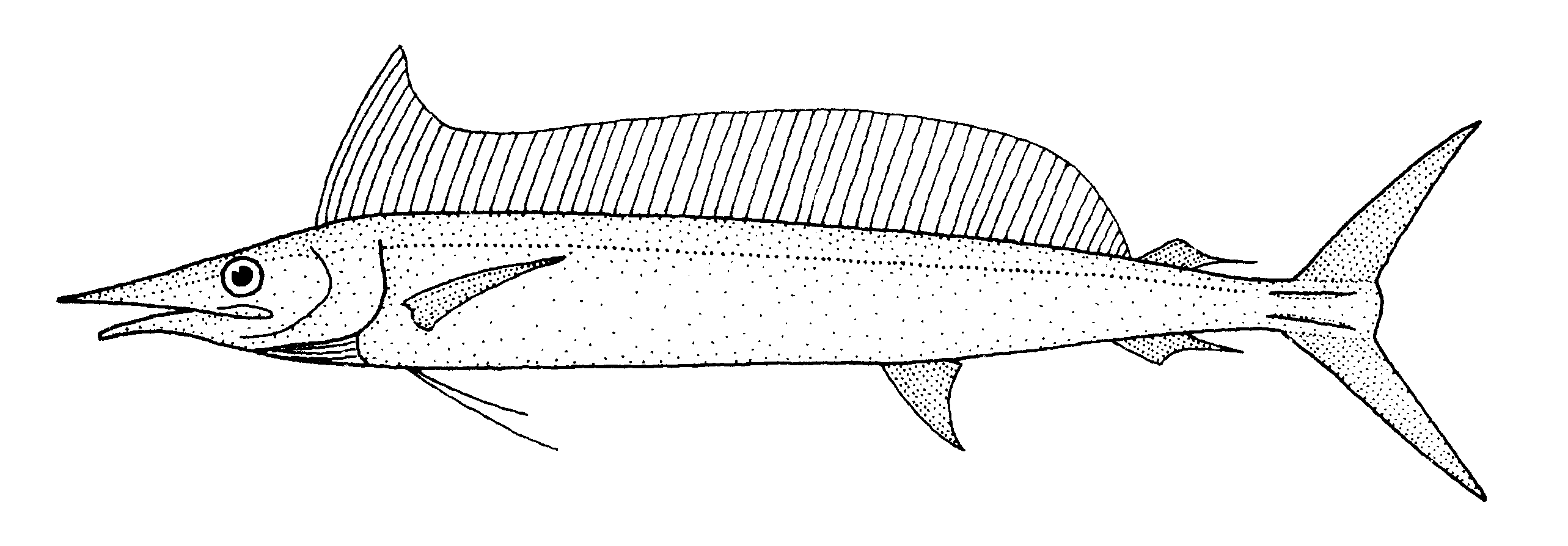
- Drawing by Dr Tony Ayling

Conservation status
- Data Deficient (IUCN 3.1)

Scientific classification
- Kingdom: Animalia
- Phylum: Chordata
- Class: Actinopterygii
- Order: Carangiformes
- Suborder: Menoidei
- Superfamily: Xiphioidea
- Family: Istiophoridae
- Genus: Tetrapturus
- Species: T. angustirostris

Binomial name
- Tetrapturus angustirostris S. Tanaka (I), 1915

Synonyms
- Pseudohistiophorus angustirostris (S. Tanaka (I), 1915); Tetrapturus illingworthi D. S. Jordan & Evermann, 1926; Pseudohistiophorus illingworthi (D. S. Jordan & Evermann, 1926); Tetrapturus kraussi D. S. Jordan & Evermann, 1926

= Shortbill spearfish =

Species of ray-finned fish

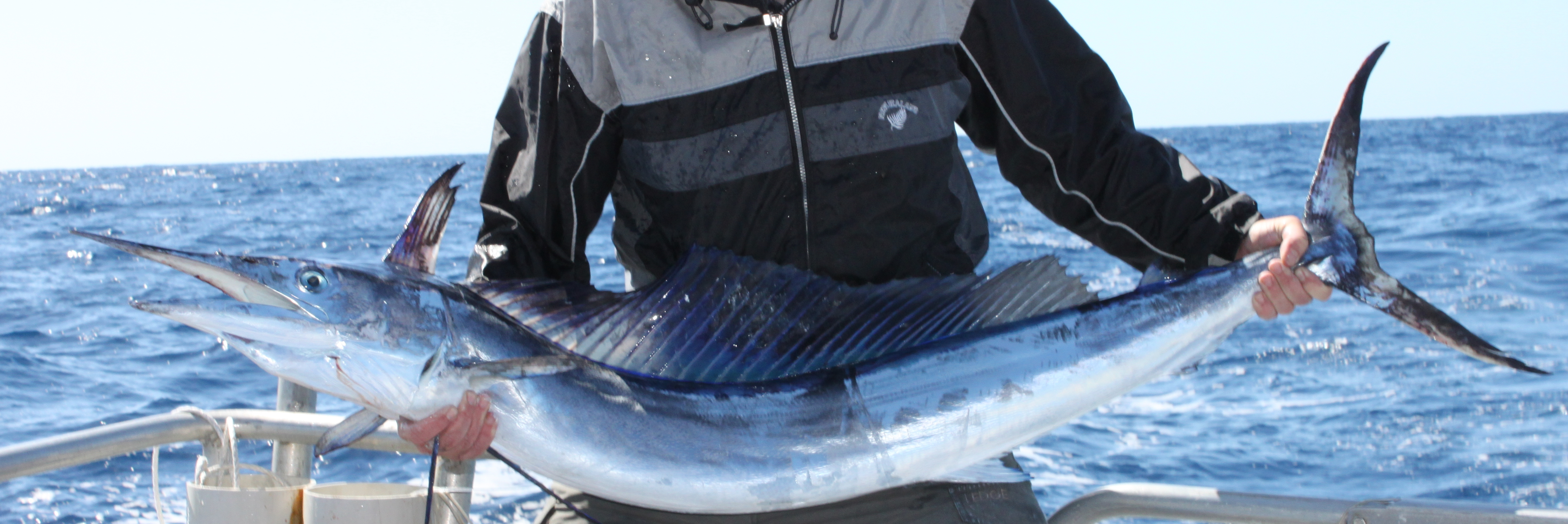
A Shortbill Spearfish caught off Great Barrier Island, New Zealand in March 2010

The shortbill spearfish (Tetrapturus angustirostris), sometimes called the short-nosed spearfish, is a species of marlin native to the Indian and Pacific Oceans, with occasional records from the Atlantic Ocean. This species occurs in open waters not far from the surface. This species can reach a length of 230 cm (91 in), though most do not exceed 190 cm (75 in). The maximum recorded weight for this species is 52 kg (115 lb). It is of minor importance to commercial fisheries and is also a game fish. Short bill spearfish are characterized by a slim frame with a blue body that is silver underneath. Shortbill also possess a very short bill extending from their upper jaw.
