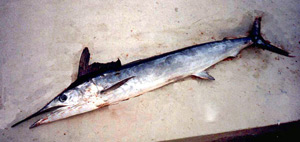

Conservation status
- Least Concern (IUCN 3.1)

Scientific classification
- Kingdom: Animalia
- Phylum: Chordata
- Class: Actinopterygii
- Division: Teleostei
- Order: Carangiformes
- Family: Istiophoridae
- Genus: Tetrapturus
- Species: T. belone

Binomial name
- Tetrapturus belone Rafinesque, 1810

Synonyms
- Histiophorus belone (Rafinesque, 1810); Makaira belone (Rafinesque, 1810); Skeponopodus typus Nardo, 1833; Scheponopodus prototypus Canestrini, 1872

= Mediterranean spearfish =

Species of ray-finned fish

The Mediterranean spearfish (Tetrapturus belone) is a species of marlin native to the Mediterranean Sea where it is particularly common around Italy, although there is a probable record of one caught off Madeira. It is an open-water fish, being found within 200 metres (660 ft) of the surface. They are highly migratory within the central Mediterranean, with core habitats in the Tyrrhenian Sea and Strait of Sicily. This species can reach a length of 240 centimetres (94 in) TL. The heaviest recorded specimen weighed in at 70 kilograms (150 lb) This species is of minor importance to commercial fisheries.
