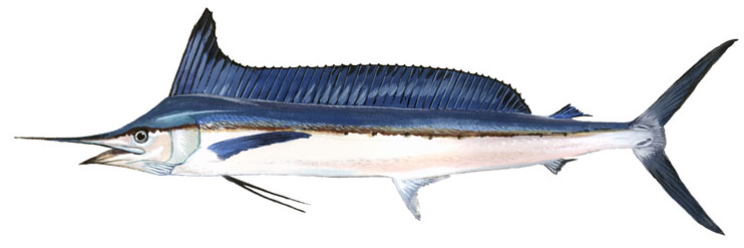

Conservation status
- Least Concern (IUCN 3.1)

Scientific classification
- Kingdom: Animalia
- Phylum: Chordata
- Class: Actinopterygii
- Order: Carangiformes
- Family: Istiophoridae
- Genus: Tetrapturus
- Species: T. pfluegeri

Binomial name
- Tetrapturus pfluegeri C. R. Robins & de Sylva, 1963

= Longbill spearfish =

Species of ray-finned fish

The longbill spearfish (Tetrapturus pfluegeri) is a species of marlin native to the Atlantic Ocean where it is found above the thermocline in open waters between 40°N and 35°S. This species can reach a length of 254 centimetres (100 in) FL and the maximum weight recorded is 58 kilograms (128 lb). It feeds on pelagic fishes such as needlefish, tuna, and jack, as well as squids. They spawn once a year. The specific name honours the Florida game fisherman and taxidermist Albert Pflueger Sr, who died in 1962.

== Description ==
The longbill spearfish is a blueish black color from above, and silvery-white and brown on the sides. The pectorals are blackish-brown and the dorsal fins are dark blue.
