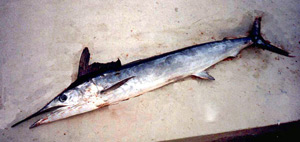
- Mediterranean spearfish (T. belone)

Scientific classification
- Kingdom: Animalia
- Phylum: Chordata
- Class: Actinopterygii
- Order: Carangiformes
- Family: Istiophoridae
- Genus: Tetrapturus; Rafinesque, 1810

Type species
- Tetrapturus belone Rafinesque, 1810

Synonyms
- Lamontella J. L. B. Smith, 1956; Marlina Z. Grey, 1928; Pseudohistiophorus F. de Buen, 1950; Skeponopodus Nardo, 1833

= Tetrapturus =

Genus of fishes

Tetrapturus is a genus of marlins commonly called spearfish or spearchucker fish in Eastern Europe, found in tropical and subtropical oceans throughout the world. Some are popular sport fish in big-game fishing.

== Species ==
There are currently four recognized species in this genus:

- Tetrapturus angustirostris S. Tanaka (I), 1915 (Shortbill spearfish)
- Tetrapturus belone Rafinesque, 1810 (Mediterranean spearfish)
- Tetrapturus georgii R. T. Lowe, 1841 (Roundscale spearfish)
- Tetrapturus pfluegeri C. R. Robins & de Sylva, 1963 (Longbill spearfish)

Fossil relatives of spearfishes include Prototetrapturus from the Late Miocene of Algeria, and both Pizzikoskerma & Sicophasma from the late Miocene of Italy. All are placed in the clade Tetrapturomorpha.
