= Big-game fishing =

Offshore sportfishing targeting large fish such as tuna or marlin

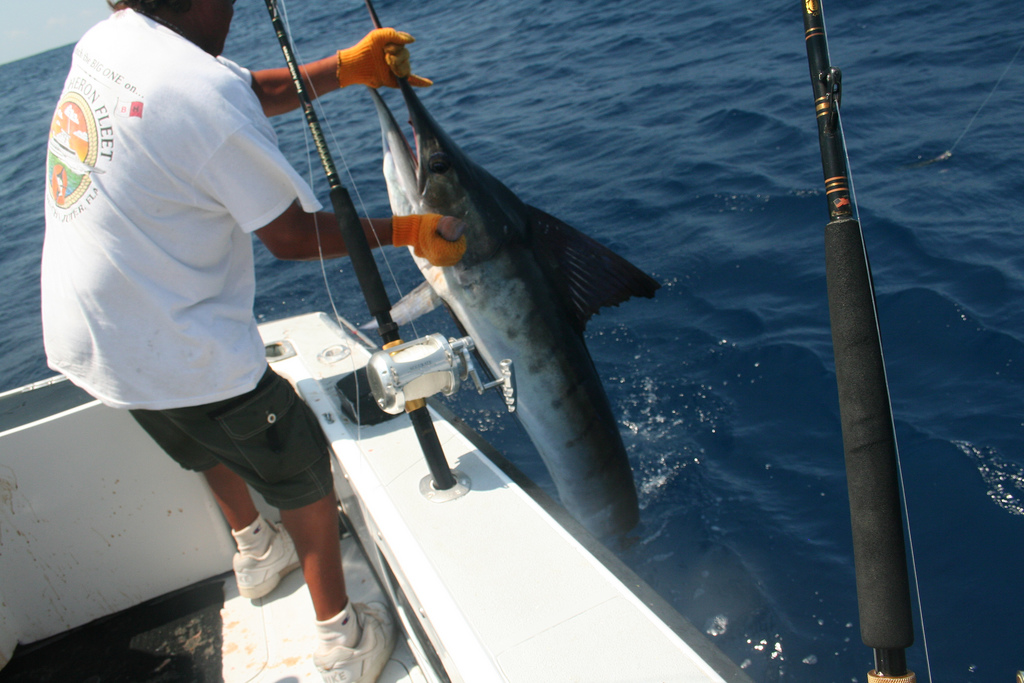
Seven-foot (two-meter) Indo-Pacific blue marlin (Makaira mazara). This big-game fish was caught near Cabo San Lucas, on the Pacific coast of Mexico.

Big-game fishing, also known as offshore sportfishing, offshore gamefishing or blue-water fishing, is a form of recreational fishing targeting large game fish, usually on a large body of water such as a sea or ocean.

== History ==
Big-game fishing started as a sport after the invention of the motorboat. Charles Frederick Holder, a marine biologist, and early conservationist, is credited with founding the sport in 1898. He went on to found and lead the Tuna Club of Avalon and went on to publish many articles and books on the subject, noted for their combination of accurate scientific detail with exciting narratives. Purpose-built game fishing boats appeared early in the 20th century. An example is the Crete, in use at Catalina Island, California, in 1915, and shipped to Hawaii the following year. According to a newspaper report at that time, the Crete had "... a deep cockpit, a chair fitted for landing big fish and leather pockets for placing the pole."

== Big-game species ==
The billfish (swordfish, marlin and sailfish), larger tunas (bluefin, yellowfin and bigeye) and sharks (mako, bull, great white, tiger, hammerhead and other large species) are the main species recognized as big-game fish. Many anglers also consider groupers and Atlantic tarpon as big-game species.

Smaller game fish, such as dolphinfish, wahoo, smaller tuna species such as albacore and skipjack tuna and barracuda are commonly caught as bycatch or taken deliberately for use as live or dead bait and/or chum.

== Locations ==
Historically most of the locations where the sport was developed, such as Avalon, California; Florida; Bimini in the Bahamas; Cairns, Queensland, Australia; northern New Zealand; Panama; Wedgeport in Nova Scotia and Kona in Hawaii, benefited from the presence of large numbers of gamefish relatively close to shore, within range of the boats of that era.

As the vessels used for sportfishing became larger, faster, longer-ranged and more seaworthy, big-game species are now pursued on grounds ranging from 60 or 70 miles' distance from port, such as the submarine canyons of the United States continental shelf, to hundreds of miles as in the case of the San Diego long range fishery, where large live-aboard vessels range far out into the Pacific searching for tuna schools.

Today big-game fishing is carried out from ports in tropical and temperate coasts practically worldwide.

=== Anglo-America ===
The United States has the world's largest saltwater fishing industry and along the entire length of the East Coast, from Key West to the Gulf of Maine, big-game anglers pursue a variety of tropical and temperate sportfish ranging from sailfish and dolphinfish in the Florida Keys to giant bluefin tuna in Massachusetts and in Canadian waters. The West Coast lacks the influence of the warm Gulf Stream current, and most big game species are mainly confined to California, a birthplace of the sport. Some of the same species that were fished for by the pioneers of the sport — Pacific bluefin tuna, broadbill swordfish and striped marlin — are still fished for today.

=== Latin and South America ===
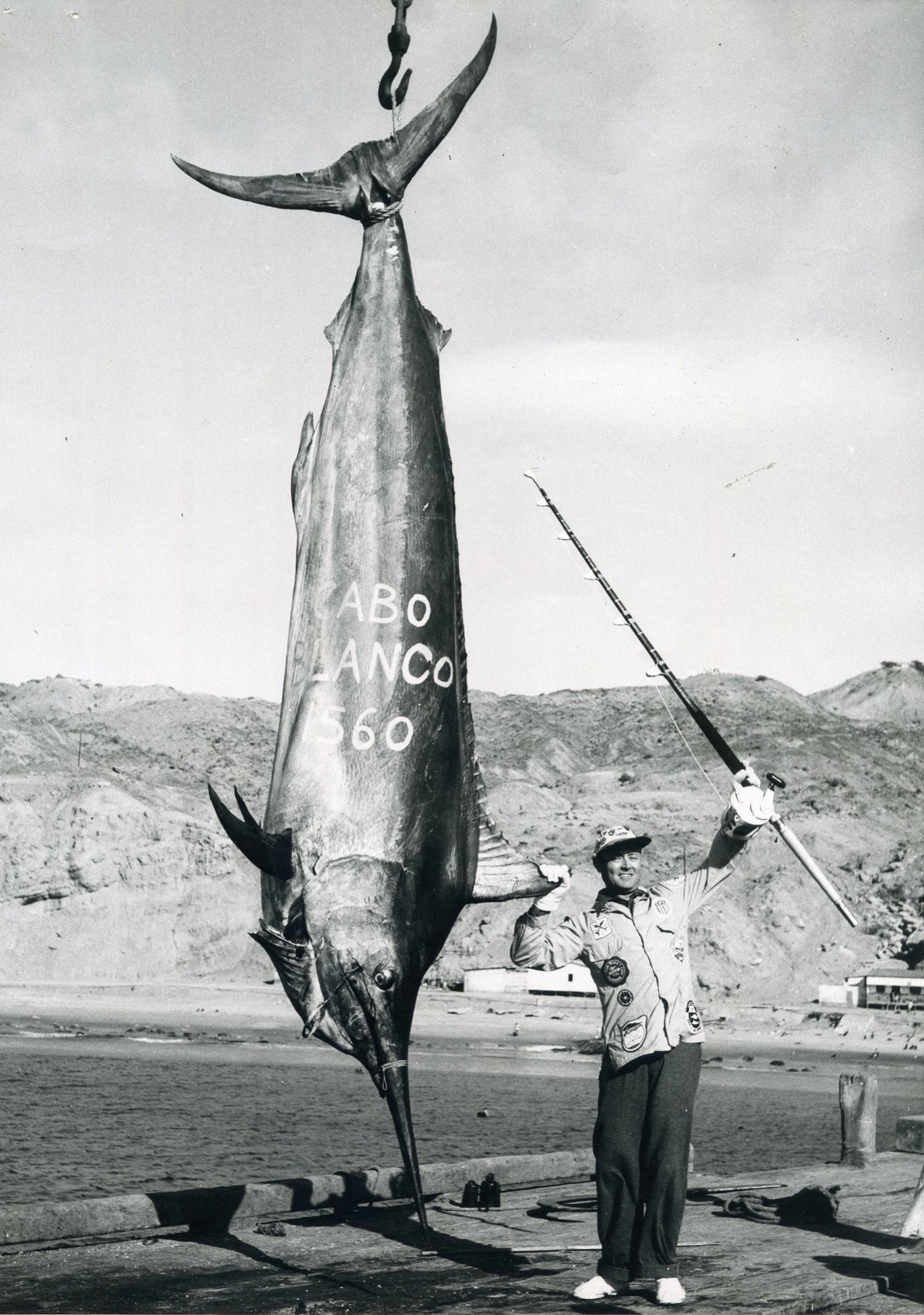
Record-breaking black marlin weighing 1,560 pounds (710 kg) caught in 1953 by Alfred C. Glassell Jr. off of Cabo Blanco, Peru

Billfish and tuna are pursued in almost all the Latin American coastal nations, many of which are renowned for the excellence of their fisheries. Mexico, Panama, Costa Rica, Venezuela, Ecuador and Guatemala have the largest fleets of sport fishing boats. Costa Rica's pacific coast, especially the coast of the Guanacaste Province, is famous for its fishing because of the ocean currents and the government catch and release laws.

Rio San Juan in Nicaragua is famous for sport fishing for giant tarpon (fresh water tarpon fishing). The government presently enforces catch and release. An annual International tarpon fishing tournament has been held for many years. The 55th annual tournament was held September 13 & 14 2015.

=== Europe ===
In the United Kingdom, big-game tunny fishing off Scarborough was in fashion in the 1930s for a few years. "Tunny" was the name used in Britain at that time for Atlantic bluefin tuna. Colonel Edward Peel landed a world-record tunny of 798 pounds (362.0 kg), capturing the record by 40 pounds (18.1 kg) from one caught off Nova Scotia by the American champion Zane Grey.

== Boats ==
Big-game fishing requires a boat of sufficient seaworthiness and range to transport the crew to the fishing grounds and back. Boats that fit these requirements may be as small as the 18 to 21-foot trailerable boats commonly used along the Australian coast, in New Zealand and on the lee coasts of the Hawaiian Islands where they are known as the "mosquito fleet". At the other extreme the 100-foot and larger vessels of the San Diego long range fleet and similar, although less refined "party boats" operating from New England, transport 25, 30 or more anglers in search of yellowfin, bluefin and bigeye tuna.

The cost of a suitable boat, electronics, tackle and the operating costs (fuels and other consumables, insurance, mooring fees and maintenance) can be very substantial. Consequently, many big-game anglers prefer to use charter services where they hire the use of a boat and equipment, and the fish-finding expertise of a captain, in preference to maintaining their own. Either way, big-game fishing can be an extremely expensive pursuit, and one in which the wealthy have tended to feature prominently.

The classic sport fisherman Most of the features of the classic sport fisherman were gradually developed in the 1920s and 1930s as existing motor cruisers and commercial fishing vessels were adapted for fishing with outriggers, fighting chairs and other ancillaries such as bait boxes and flybridge helm stations. These boats, though crude by modern standards, scored many pioneering big game catches of huge bluefin tuna, broadbill swordfish and marlin. Through the 1930s and 1940s sportfishermen in Florida, amongst them John Rybovich and Ernest Hemingway, continued to innovate and refine, and in 1946 the Rybovich yard launched the Miss Chevy II, a 34-footer that crystallized all the innovations that had gone before into a design whose features - raised foredeck, flybridge controls and roomy cockpit - are still closely followed by today's leading sportfish builders. The need for greater range and speed as anglers sought gamefish further and further offshore resulted in the development of bigger boats powered by larger engines, but the basic layout of a dedicated big game fishing vessel has remained largely the same since the late 1940s.

Smaller sportfishing boats The development of outboard power opened up many big game fishing grounds to smaller craft in the 18 to 25 foot range. Various boats designs may fit this category but in recent times the center console has become popular due to the ability to fish from all edges of the boat, providing the angler flexibility when fighting or landing fish.

Electronics Electronics technology developed for commercial fishermen has become increasingly used by recreational anglers. Fishfinders, also known as bottom machines or echo sounders, are now commonplace. Other electronics used to narrow down the search for fish may include radar, forward or side-scanning sonar, water temperature sensors and sea surface temperature imagery obtained from satellites.

== Land-based big-game game fishing ==
In some areas big-game species can be caught by land-based anglers practicing land-based game fishing, with the rock platforms of Jervis Bay in New South Wales, Australia being probably the most well-known. Black marlin of up to 200 lbs have been caught here by anglers floating out baits on balloons.

== Techniques ==
=== Trolling ===
Fish are enticed by trolling fishing lures (designed to resemble squid or other baitfish) or baits behind the boat. Multiple lines are often used. Outriggers were designed to spread the lines more widely. The outrigger holds the lines further away from the boat's wake, setting lures into more clear water thus making it easier for fish to target in on available lures.

=== Chumming ===
Chumming or chunking is the practice of throwing groundbait made of pieces of bait fish overboard to attract larger game fish. This is called berley in Australia.

=== Fighting the fish ===
Once a fish is properly hooked on a line, a somewhat tricky task as often initial nibbles only partly hook the fish, one of the fishermen attempts to reel it in. The captain assists by maneuvering the boat so that the fish remains astern (behind the boat), while other members of the crew race to reel in the other lines so as to avoid tangling with the angler reeling in the fish.

Most of the time, the fishing line used for sport fishing has a breaking strain less than the maximum force the fish can apply to the line. The fishing reels therefore have sophisticated, adjustable drag mechanisms which allow the line to escape if the fish pulls on it, but keep the specified tension on the line. When hooked, most fish will circulate in different directions, and when they are not pulling away from the boat the fisherman can take the opportunity to reel in some of the line. Eventually, if the fish tires and has not broken the line, they will be reeled in; however, the challenge does not end there. Hauling a heavy, powerful, and still very much alive fish on board the boat represents a considerable challenge, unless the fish is tagged and released. Strategies include: gaffing, pulling it in with one's hands, or a net for smaller fish.

The fish can be fought with or without a game-chair. With a game-chair, the angler sits in a specially designed chair at the stern of the boat, and places the butt of the rod into a gimbaled mount. Most rods used in this manner are quite long. The older and more classic models had straight rod butts. More contemporary models have bent rod butts, which give a more convenient angle for fighting the fish when the rod is placed in the mount. With large fish, this can still represent a considerable challenge, but "stand-up" game fishing, without the assistance of a chair and with the seat mount replaced by a harness, requires a good deal of strength and endurance, as well as body mass.

=== Kite fishing ===
Big Game fishing has evolved from a heavy tackle to a light tackle sport in many regions. Using a fishing kite has opened the door to fishing for Billfish, especially Sailfish with tackle as light as 8 or 12 lb but normally 20 - 30 lb gear is used. The kite is also effective on Tuna, Dolphin fish (Mahi Mahi), Sharks, Marlin, Swordfish & all sorts of other Big Game fish. The idea behind the kite is that a smaller live bait can be fished on lighter tackle and positioned away from the boat and placed right on the surface. The Bait fish will try to run away or fight to get deeper in the water column, but the kite will hold the bait in place. The fighting action and stress of the bait will "turn on" big game fish and cause them to strike. This method of fishing not only presents a bait to the Big Game Fish but drives the fish to strike the bait.

=== Bait fishing ===
Bait fishing is fishing while using bait. Bait is usually alive for catching better fish.

=== Artificial lure fishing ===
Lure fishing typically employs the use of an artificial lure used as a bait to attract game fish. Artificial fishing lures can either be a hard bait or soft bait construction.

== See also ==
- Anglers
- Sport fishing
- Marlin fishing
