= The Old Man and the Sea (1958 film) =

1958 film by John Sturges

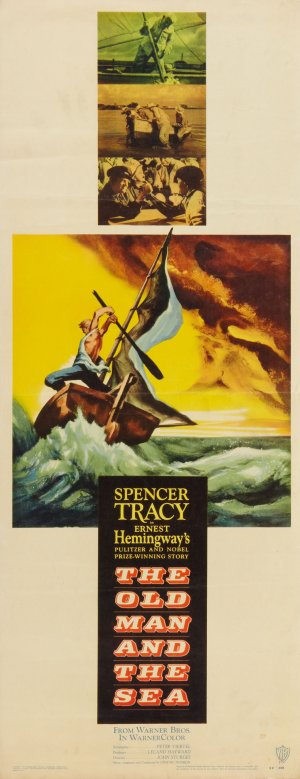
- Theatrical release poster
- Directed by: John Sturges
- Screenplay by: Peter Viertel
- Based on: The Old Man and the Sea; 1952 novella by Ernest Hemingway
- Produced by: Leland Hayward
- Starring: Spencer Tracy
- Cinematography: James Wong Howe (Note: Floyd Crosby and Tom Tutwiler are credited with additional photography. Lamar Boren was credited for the film's underwater photography.)
- Edited by: Arthur P. Schmidt
- Music by: Dimitri Tiomkin
- Distributed by: Warner Bros. Pictures
- Release dates: October 7, 1958 (New York); October 11, 1958
- Running time: 87 minutes
- Country: United States
- Language: English
- Budget: $5 million

The Old Man and the Sea is a 1958 American adventure drama film adapted from the 1952 novella of the same name by Ernest Hemingway. The film was directed by John Sturges and stars Spencer Tracy in the title role. The screenplay was adapted by Peter Viertel. Dimitri Tiomkin won the Academy Award for Best Original Score for his work on the film. The film was also nominated for Best Color Cinematography (for James Wong Howe) and Best Actor (Tracy).

== Plot ==
In Cuba, Santiago is an elderly fisherman who has not caught a fish in 84 days. Manolin, a 14-year-old boy, accompanies Santiago as he carries his fishing gear between Santiago's skiff and his shack. However, Manolin's father has forbidden him to accompany Santiago out to sea, fearing he is salao (very unlucky). Since Santiago has not eaten in days, Manolin fetches coffee from Martin, a café owner. When he returns, they talk about baseball and Joe DiMaggio. At night, Manolin leaves and Santiago dreams of Africa, which he experienced during his youth.

On the 85th day, Santiago wakes up early and sails in his boat intending to row far into the ocean. As Santiago uses sardine for bait, a fish is caught on one of Santiago's fishing lines. Santiago suspects that it is a large fish and allows it to pull the boat for four hours. Santiago holds the line throughout the night, scarring his hands in the process, and eats bonita for strength. As Santiago pulls harder on the line, a large marlin emerges from the water.

Santiago admires the marlin and shows respect towards it. Late into the night, it begins to rain and Santiago reflects on an arm-wrestling competition he had won in a tavern. By sunset, Santiago eats raw dolphin meat and manages some sleep. Suddenly, he wrestles with the marlin for a second time until it begins to circle the boat. Almost delirious, Santiago reels the marlin in and harpoons it.

As Santiago sails homeward, a mako shark smells the blood in the water and feeds on the marlin. Santiago kills the shark but loses his harpoon. Tying a knife to an oar, Santiago creates a makeshift harpoon and fends off several sharks as they feed on the marlin. During the attack, the knife blade is detached and Santiago instead clubs the sharks until they leave. Into the sunset, a regretful Santiago apologizes to the remains of the marlin. He clubs more sharks until the marlin is nearly eaten.

Santiago reaches the shore and sleeps in his shack, leaving the remains of the marlin tied to his boat. In the morning, Manolin finds Santiago and returns to the shack with coffee. Santiago wakes up feeling defeated, but Manolin reminds him that he did catch the marlin. Manolin promises to get new fishing gear for them and tells Santiago to heal. At the café, a party of tourists from Havana see the backbone of the marlin in the water, which Martin mistakens for a shark. In his shack, Santiago dreams of Africa as Manolin watches.

== Cast ==
- Spencer Tracy as The Old Man/Santiago (unnamed in the film)
- Felipe Pazos Jr. as Manolin (Note: Felipe Pazos Jr., who played the role of the boy in the film, is the son of the Cuban economist and revolutionary, Felipe Pazos.)
- Harry Bellaver as Martin
- Don Diamond as Café proprietor
- Don Blackman as Arm wrestler
- Joey Ray as a gambler
- Richard Alameda as a gambler
- Tony Rosa as a gambler
- Carlos Rivero as a gambler
- Robert Alderette as a gambler
- Don Alvarado (uncredited) as a waiter

== Production ==
The director originally assigned to the film was Fred Zinnemann, but he withdrew, and was replaced by John Sturges. The film's budget, originally $2 million, grew to $5 million "in search of suitable fish footage." Sturges called it "technically the sloppiest picture I have ever made."

According to Turner Classic Movies, a February 2005 CNN article points out that The Old Man and the Sea was one of the first films to "use a bluescreen compositing technology invented by Arthur Widmer, that combined actors on a soundstage with a pre-filmed background."

The credits note that "Some of the marlin film used in this picture was of the world's record catch by Alfred C. Glassell Jr. at the Cabo Blanco Fishing Club in Peru. Mr. Glassell acted as special advisor for these sequences."

== Music ==
Veteran film composer Dimitri Tiomkin composed and conducted the music for the film. His soundtrack recording, with the Warner Brothers Studio Orchestra, was recorded in the auditorium of Hollywood Post No. 43, American Legion, in Hollywood; Billboard reported that the acoustics in the Hollywood Legion were "far superior to most studio space in Hollywood and similar to that of the best concert halls." During the week of April 21, 1958, Columbia held open sessions for The Old Man and the Sea at the Legion Hall. The soundtrack was later released in both stereo and mono by Columbia Records.

In 2025, a re-recording of the complete score was performed by the Royal Scottish National Orchestra (RSNO) under the baton of Richard Kaufman. The recording was released by Intrada Records.

== Reception ==
Bosley Crowther of The New York Times wrote:

Credit Leland Hayward for trying something off the beaten track in making a motion-picture version of Ernest Hemingway's The Old Man and the Sea, and credit Spencer Tracy for a brave performance in its one big role. Also credit Dimitri Tiomkin for providing a musical score that virtually puts Mr. Tracy in the position of a soloist with a symphony. And that just about completes a run-down of the praiseworthy aspects of this film.

Harrison's Reports praised the performances of Tracy and Felipe Pazos Jr. They also wrote: "Worthy of special mention is the exceptional photography, in Warnercolor. Some of the shots are breathtaking in their beauty." Variety acknowledged the film "has power, vitality, and sharp excitement as it depicts the gruelling contest between man and fish. It has been exquisitely photographed and skillfully directed [...] And yet Old Man and the Sea isn't a completely satisfying picture. There are long and arid stretches, when it seems as if producer and director were merely trying to fill time."

Time magazine noted that "the script follows the book in almost every detail", but felt "to photograph these grand abstractions requires a lens more sensitive than any the Warner studio seems to have discovered in its locker. Most of the time all the spectator sees is Spencer Tracy sitting in a rowboat and mumbling to himself, and all he hears is Hemingway's own narrative prosing along the sound track."

According to producer Hayward, Hemingway was pleased with the film, and said it had "a wonderful emotional quality and [he] is very grateful and pleased with the transference of his material to the screen. He thought Tracy was great (in light of his quarrels with him this is quite a compliment) ... the photography was excellent ... the handling of the fishing and mechanical fish very good. Had some minor dislikes ... but all in all he was terribly high on the picture and pleased with it." Hemingway himself, however, stated in 1959 that the only Hollywood adaptation of one of his stories that he liked was The Killers.

On the review aggregator website Rotten Tomatoes, 75% of 12 critics' reviews are positive. Metacritic, which uses a weighted average, assigned the film a score of 49 out of 100, based on 8 critics, indicating "mixed or average" reviews.

== See also ==
- List of American films of 1958
