= Edward Peel (big-game fisherman) =

British army officer and fisherman

Sir Edward Townley Peel KBE, DSO, MC
- Born: 31 May 1884; Knutsford, Cheshire, England
- Died: 6 September 1961 (aged 77); London, England
- Education: Arnold House School
- Alma mater: Cheltenham College; Lycée Français (Tours)
- Occupations: Military officer, businessman
- Known for: Big-game tunny fishing, yachtsman
- Spouse: Françoise Nora de Revière (m. 1923–1953)

Sir Edward Townley Peel, KBE, DSO, MC (31 May 1884 – 6 September 1961) was a British army officer, businessman and amateur sportsman. He fought throughout World War I in three overseas theatres of war, rising in rank from private to colonel. He was a member of a mercantile family of Alexandria and spent much of his life in Egypt, serving as chairman of Victoria College there. In 1932, he held the world record for the heaviest Atlantic bluefin tuna caught with rod and line at 798 pounds (362 kg).

== Family background and early life ==
Peel, a son of William Felton Peel and Sarah Edith Peel, née Willoughby, daughter of General Michael Francklin Willoughby, was born at Knutsford, Cheshire, on 31 May 1884. He had thirteen brothers and sisters and was a member of the wealthy, aristocratic Peel family.

He attended Arnold House School in Llanddulas, Cheltenham College and the Lycée Français in Tours.

From 1902, he lived mostly in Egypt, in Alexandria. He was a keen cricketer both at college and in Egypt.

== Career and military service ==
=== Peel & Co. ===
The Peel family had established themselves as international traders in Egypt before the reign of Queen Victoria. Peel and Company, cotton and wheat merchants, traded from the major Mediterranean port of Alexandria. From 1882, Britain was the dominant power in Egypt, and the Peels had concomitant social power and responsibility. "Alexandria's British community, owing to its political dominance in Egypt but also to the considerable commercial success of many of its members, enjoyed a position of social prominence out of proportion to its numbers. Families like the Barkers, Peels and Carvers [...] were names to conjure with on the Cotton Exchange..." The Peels contributed to the foundation of Victoria College, Alexandria (now part of the Alexandria Schools Trust).

By the time Miles Lampson, 1st Baron Killearn was High Commissioner for Egypt, Peel & Co was "one of the biggest cotton firms of Alexandria".

Edward Peel worked in the family firm from 1902. In 1907, his father, William Felton, was killed playing polo. Edward, his elder brother Willoughby Ewart, and his father's partner Kenneth Birley took on the family business; Edward Peel became chairman in 1908. Over time, he became a director of several commercial companies and a leading member of the British community there. (Note: It is sometimes incorrectly stated that he chaired the 1936–1937 Peel Commission into the future of Palestine. In fact the chairman was William Peel, 1st Earl Peel.)

=== World War I ===
In World War I Peel served with the Wiltshire Regiment on the Western Front in France, in the Gallipoli Campaign, and with the Middle East force in Egypt, Palestine and Syria. He had a very distinguished record, being mentioned in dispatches five times and awarded the DSO and MC. From being a private in 1915 he had been promoted to lieutenant colonel by 1918; in 1919 he was awarded the Order of the Nile by the Sultan Fuad I of Egypt.

=== World War II and honours ===
During the Second World War, Peel was head of the British Community in Alexandria. On the recommendation of Sir Miles Lampson, Peel was awarded the KBE. He was knighted in 1944. He was also honoured by another government, that of Paul of Greece, King of the Hellenes, who awarded him the Grand Officer of the Order of George I in 1947. (Note: "Grand Officer" is as reported by the London Gazette announcement. The proper title seems to be "Grand Commander".)

=== Suez Crisis ===
In 1952 Peel wrote to London warning of the impossibility of maintaining a secure base on the Suez Canal; historian Philip Mansel characterises his intervention as "tr[ying] to instil sense in the British government". Peel was a close friend of Walter Monckton, 1st Viscount Monckton of Brenchley and wrote to advise him that 'If Anthony Eden is banking on the Egyptians not being able to run the Canal, to think again. They could do it on their heads. I have been using the canal for fifty years and the Suez Canal Company have been providing a second rate service at exorbitant prices.' The government ignored his advice, failed to withdraw British troops, and the Suez Crisis ensued.

Peel insisted on keeping Peel & Co as a British registered company and paying taxes to Britain, for he believed that the British government would help protect the company, should there be political instability. This it did not. After the Suez crisis, President Nasser confiscated the company and its assets and expelled Peel and his family from Egypt.

In 1958 Peel produced a report for the government on protecting British property in Egypt which was accepted but not acted upon. Peel was one of the main protagonists in the effort to secure adequate compensation for the British residents who lost their all. Killearn states that Peel was 'foremost in pressing the claims of the "small man" in priority to the larger claimants of who he was, of course, one of the biggest in the class of private firms'.

== Personal life ==
In 1923 he married Françoise Nora de Revière. (Note: Françoise Nora de Revière (1887–1953), second daughter of Francis de Revière)

Peel became a fellow of the Royal Geographical Society in 1933, proposed by Field-Marshal Lord Allenby, and was vice-president of the Marine Biological Association of the United Kingdom.

=== Big-game tunny fishing ===
Peel was keenly interested in marine biology and he provided his yacht and gave assistance to Frederick Russell in investigating the movements of tunny off the east coast of Britain. Although local fishermen considered there had been no tunny before World War I, the studies suggested that migration into the North Sea had not been recent. There are photographs of Peel and Russell engaged on this study. (Note: Cermele, Joe (21 October 2010). "The Glory Days of the Giant Scarborough "Tunny"". Field & Stream. See, in particular, pages 3 and 4 of this photo gallery which is drawn from Ross, 2010.) In 1934, together with Richard Kindersley, he took out a patent for a fishing reel. It incorporated a frictional braking device which allowed big-game fish to pull out the line under strong tension, while leaving the line free during baiting, etc.

Following a catch off the Yorkshire coast of a large Atlantic bluefin tuna in 1929 (the fish were called "tunny" in Britain at the time), big-game tunny fishing in Britain became fashionable from 1930. Scarborough was the centre of attraction and the town was transformed into a resort for the wealthy who fished from their yachts. Magazines published many sensational stories covering the personalities and the yachts that sailed to Scarborough. A gentlemen's club, the British Tunny Club, was founded there in 1933 and Peel was their first president. In the season, which was August and September, Peel sailed with his "huge steam yacht" St George with an "exotic Sudanese crew" and in 1932 he landed a world-record tunny of 798 pounds (362.0 kg), capturing the record by over 40 pounds (18 kg) from a tuna caught off Nova Scotia by American champion Zane Grey. In 1950, when North Sea tunny were declining, Peel nevertheless caught a 639-pound (290 kg) specimen. Much of Mark Ross's book The Glory Days of the Giant Scarborough Tunny is dedicated to Peel's fishing.

== Death ==
Peel died at the Grosvenor House Hotel, London on 6 September 1961. His memorial service was held at the Grosvenor Chapel, Mayfair, London. Lord Killearn, former ambassador to Egypt, wrote an obituary of Peel, which was published in The Times, 26 September 1961. Killearn describes Peel as 'an outstanding character excelling at work as at play, a first-class shot, a fine cricketer and golfer, a good tennis played who navigated his own yacht the S.S. St. George of 500 tons' and says that the distressing miscarriage of the Suez crisis resulting in the expulsion and ruin of the British community in 1956 broke Peel's heart and hastened his death.
