= Arthur Widmer =

J. Arthur Widmer (July 25, 1914 in Washington, D.C. – May 28, 2006 in Los Angeles, California) was an American film special effects pioneer. He invented the "Ultra Violet Traveling matte process", an early version of what would become known as bluescreen. At the age 16 he entered University of Michigan and graduated in 1935 with a Bachelor of Science in Chemistry.

== Career ==
Arthur Widmer began his career at Kodak in 1935, as a researcher in Rochester, New York. He learned much, and being seen as a creative thinker was attached on a three-year stint in 1943 as one of the Kodak researchers assigned to the Manhattan Project in Berkeley, California and Oak Ridge, Tennessee, as an analytical chemist developing methods of uranium analysis, which led to the development of the atomic bomb.

Post World War II, and having spent so much time at Los Alamos, New Mexico, in 1947 he sought warmer climes than Rochester and moved to Kodak's Hollywood office with the introduction of Kodak's color film processing. Widmer helped introduce the new Eastman Color Negative and Positive Film, a multilayered color motion picture film that changed the dynamics of power in the movie industry.

He left Kodak in 1951 and joined Warner Brothers to design and build the first Eastman color film professional processing machine in the country and began his work with the Ultra Violet Traveling matte process. Widmer also developed and refined technologies for other motion picture processes including 3D and widescreen. He began developing Bluescreen techniques, with one of the first films to use the technique being the screen adaptation of the novella by Ernest Hemingway written in Cuba in 1951, The Old Man and the Sea, starring Spencer Tracy in 1958.

In 1960 Arthur joined the Marquardt Corporation Van Nuys Plant as the lead research group investigating photographic methods of data storage and retrieval.

In 1964, Widmer joined Universal Studios to design and build the optical department, where he continued his work on the blue screen technique and other visual effects until his retirement in 1979. The modern electronic counterpart of Widmer's technique, chroma keying, is commonly used in television broadcasting today, such as in weather forecast presentations.

On February 12, 2005, aged 90, at a gala black tie dinner at the Ritz-Carlton Huntington Hotel in Pasadena, California, Widmer received a special Award of Commendation for technical contributions from the Academy of Motion Picture Arts and Sciences. The Academy's Science and Technology committee honored Widmer for helping develop methods for advancing the art of storytelling on film: Most notable: processes that make it seem as if actors are in faraway locations when in fact they are working on sound stages in Hollywood or elsewhere.

Arthur Widmer died of cancer in Hollywood, aged 91. His sister Babara Dinwoodie was a local artist in Chester County, Pennsylvania.

== Quotations ==
- "Compositing technology became key to creating magical illusions in movies because you could now shoot shots that couldn't be shot or wouldn't be shot because they were too expensive," Arthur Widmer, 2001 interview from his home in Hollywood
- "Art's pioneering work has had a profound impact on the film industry. Many of the films we hold dear would not have been possible without his contributions to image compositing technology." Richard Edlund of the Academy's Scientific and Technical Awards Committee when the Special Award Oscar award was announced in 2005
- "In my day, being digitally adept meant you could play the piccolo. Your award to me seems a little out of place because, with it, you have honoured analogue achievements made in an era devoid of acronyms." Arthur Widmer, in his acceptance speech of his Academy Special Award.
