= Alfred C. Glassell Jr. =

American businessman and fisherman (1913–2008)

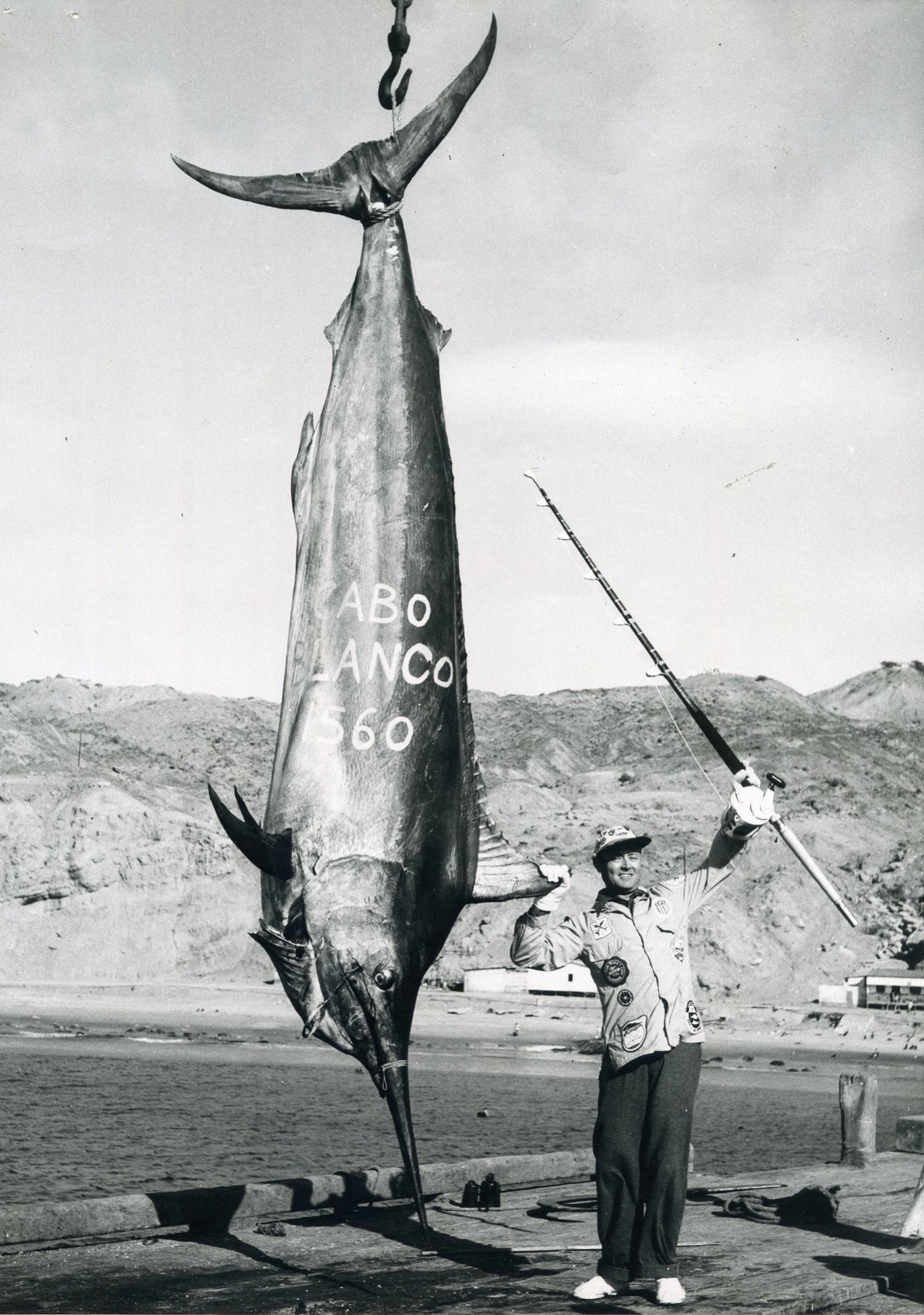
Glassell with his record-breaking black marlin caught in 1953 at Cabo Blanco, Peru

Alfred Curry Glassell Jr. (March 31, 1913 – October 29, 2008) was an American businessman and philanthropist. He made a fortune in the oil and gas industry in Louisiana and Texas and was a co-founder of Transcontinental Pipeline. He amassed a significant collection of gold artifacts and had a long association with the Museum of Fine Arts, Houston, also making significant contributions to the Houston Museum of Natural Science and in oceanographic research. As a sport fisherman he set a longstanding record for the largest black marlin caught by handheld rod, weighing 1,560 pounds (710 kg), which is recognised by the International Game Fish Association (IGFA) as the largest bony fish caught by hand.

== Early life ==
Glassell was born on March 31, 1913, at the Cuba Plantation near Shreveport, Louisiana. He was the son of Frances Elvira (née Lane) and Alfred C. Glassell. He attended C. E. Byrd High School in Shreveport and went on to attend Louisiana State University, graduating with a Bachelor of Arts in 1934.

Glassell served with the United States Army during World War II, attaining the rank of major. He was aide-de-camp to General Troy H. Middleton, the commanding officer of the 45th Infantry Division, and saw combat in North Africa, Sicily and Italy.

== Business career ==
Glassell followed his father into the oil and gas business, helping discover a number of new fields on the Gulf Coast in Louisiana and Texas. He was a co-founder of the Transcontinental Gas Pipe Line Corporation (Transco), which built the first gas transmission system between Texas and New York. He served on the boards of Transco, El Paso Natural Gas and First City Bank Corporation.

Glassell's estate at the time of his death in 2008 was reportedly valued at $500 million (equivalent to $750 million in 2025) and included "stocks and bonds, oil leases, ranches, artifact treasures and a $5.8 million home near the River Oaks Country Club".

== Philanthropy ==
Glassell began collecting art in his thirties. In 1970 he was elected to the board of trustees of the Museum of Fine Arts, Houston (MFAH), becoming chairman in 1990. He worked closely with museum director Peter Marzio towards achieving "major museum status—greatly increasing attendance, membership, operating budget, endowment, and collections". He oversaw the planning and fundraising for the Audrey Jones Beck building, which opened in 2000 as a major expansion of the existing museum, and helped create the museum's teaching institute which was named the Glassell School of Art in his honour.

Glassell had a particular interest in West African gold ornamentation, which according to MFAH curator Frances Marzio represented "the greatest collection of African gold in the world". Beginning in 1997 he donated his personal holdings of African, Asian and Pre-Columbian art to the museum, which became the Glassell Collections of African, Indonesian, and Pre-Columbian Gold.

Glassell was also a "lifelong advocate for marine biology research". He led oceanographic expeditions in his vessel Argosy, including a 1957 expedition for Yale University and a 1961 expedition for the University of Miami. In 1971 he was awarded the Marine Science Award by the International Oceanographic Foundation. An oceanographic research laboratory at the University of Miami's Rosenstiel School of Marine, Atmospheric, and Earth Science was named in his honour.

== Fishing ==
Glassell was an avid sport fisherman, becoming interested in fishing as a small child in northwest Louisiana. As an adult he took up big-game fishing, frequently travelling overseas to target large game fish including bluefin tuna, swordfish and marlin. During the 1950s he represented the United States in the International Tuna Cup, captaining the team to second place in the series in 1952. He was the first to land a black marlin weighing over 1,000 pounds (450 kg) under International Game Fish Association (IGFA) rules. He was one of the founders of the Cabo Blanco Fishing Club located at Cabo Blanco, Peru, which he described as "the mecca, the heaven, the Valhalla of all fishing".

On August 4, 1953, while fishing off of Cabo Blanco, Glassell caught a black marlin weighing 1,560 pounds (710 kg) using a handheld 7-foot (2.1 m) bamboo rod, a Fin-Nor reel and 130-pound-test linen line. This set a new IGFA record in the all-tackle and 130-pound line classes, and for the largest bony fish caught by hand. According to Marlin magazine his catch remained a record as of 2023, despite significant improvements in technology and materials. Glassell's feat attracted significant attention. He appeared on the cover of Sports Illustrated in March 1956 and footage of his catch was used in the 1958 film adaptation of The Old Man and the Sea. A review of the footage found that the fish threw itself into the air 49 times, eventually exhausting itself over a period of two hours.

Glassell donated the record-breaking fish to the National Museum of Natural History at the Smithsonian. Other fish and sealife he caught – "sailfish, wahoo, schools of tuna, sharks, dorado, roosterfish, a pod of dusky dolphin and even the surreal Mola mola" – were donated by his family to the Houston Museum of Natural Science to be exhibited in the Alfred C. Glassell Jr. Hall. The Smithsonian also gave the mounted black marlin to the Houston Museum on a long-term lease, exhibited in a climate-controlled case built into the hall.

== Personal life ==
Glassell's first wife was Jean Noemi Aubert; they divorced and she later married music executive Morris Levy. In 1962 he remarried to Clare Attwell; he had six children in total. He died in Houston on October 29, 2008, aged 95, and was interred at Glenwood Cemetery, Houston.

Glassell left approximately $200 million (equivalent to $300 million in 2025) to charity in his last will, via a bequest to the Glassell Family Foundation which he had established years earlier. That bequest was contested by his daughter Curry, with a jury finding in November 2009 against her argument that Glassell was suffering from dementia at the time he drafted the will in 2003.
