= Sergio Barreda =

Peruvian surfer

Sergio Barreda Costa (30 April 1951 – 25 April 2002), known as Gordo Barreda, was a Peruvian surfer and surfboard shaper. He was a four-time Peruvian national champion (1968, 1969, 1970 and 1974), competed internationally, and was one of Peru's first shapers.

Barreda spent his whole life in the Miraflores District of Lima, learning to surf at Club Makaha. His mother Sonia supported his surfing from an early age. A story is told of the school director telling her that Sergio, aged 13, was being distracted and he had to study or surf, not both, and she replied "Sergio will surf."

As a shaper he made boards under the "GB" logo. His surf shop, which started in the garage of his home and with the help of his wife Eva, was the first in the country. He also put together a team of young surfers who competed under his GB logo, a number of whom followed in his footsteps to be Peruvian national champions.

In 1979 he discovered the now well-known break of Cabo Blanco in northern Peru.

In 2002 he suffered a heart attack surfing Cerro Azul, and had surgery for it a few days later in Miraflores, but died of a further post-operative heart attack, aged 50. His ashes were spread at sea.

A 2.2 meter statue was unveiled in his honor at Makaha beach in 2020.
