= Big-game tunny fishing off Scarborough =

Sport of English gentlemen in 1930s

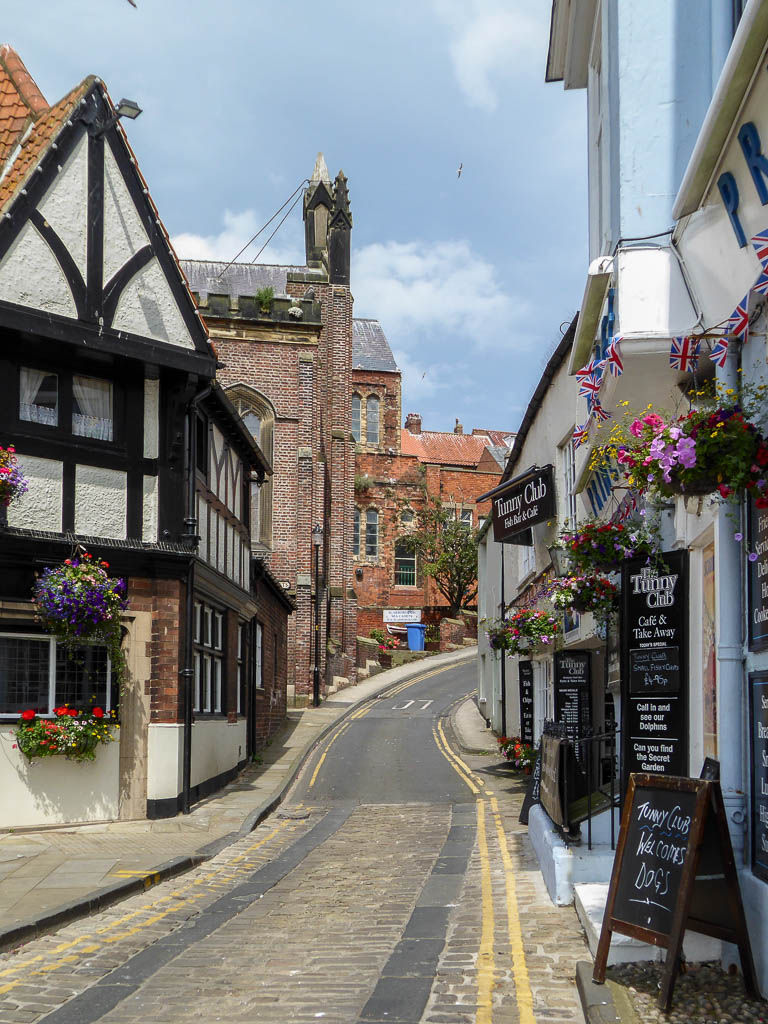
The Tunny Club, East Sandgate, Scarborough Harbour, Yorkshire

Big-game tunny fishing off Scarborough was a sport practised by wealthy aristocrats and military officers mostly in the 1930s. The British Tunny Club was founded in Scarborough in 1933 and had its headquarters there. The Atlantic bluefin tuna (Thunnus Thynnus) (or "tunny" as it was known in Britain at the time) is a large and powerful fish, arguably the strongest fish in the world, which is frequently the target of big-game fishermen. Off the Yorkshire coast in that era various records were made (including a world record) for size of tunny caught with rod and line. Tunny was present in the North Sea until the 1950s when commercial herring and mackerel fishing depleted its food supply and it became extirpated.

== Tunny fishing ==
The tunny is a large and powerful fish, arguably the strongest fish in the world, with a fishing season mostly in August and September in Britain. In the 1930s rods six foot six inches long were used made of hickory, bamboo, lancewood and greenheart. American Ashaway lines of natural fibre were favoured. Mackerel and herring were used for bait on five-inch hooks.

Often tunny were to be found near commercial herring drifters tracking the migrating shoals of herring along the coast, or near steam trawlers hauling their catches. Actual angling was done from a small boat, sometimes a coble towed to the fishing grounds behind a large yacht.

== Scarborough ==
In 1929 the steam drifter Ascendent caught a 560-pound (250 kg) tunny and a Scarborough showman awarded the crew 50 shillings so he could exhibit it as a tourist attraction. Henry Stapleton-Cotton pioneered sport fishing for tunny in Britain although both the fish he hooked in 1929 escaped. Big-game fishing effectively started in 1930 when Lorenzo "Lawrie" Mitchell-Henry, when fifty miles offshore, landed the first tunny caught on rod and line weighing 560 pounds (250 kg). After a poor season in 1931, the following year saw Harold Hardy of Cloughton Hall battling with a tunny about 16 feet long for over seven hours before his line snapped. Also on board the trawler Dick Whittington were four visitors who described the struggle as "the greatest fight they had ever seen in their lives". Mrs Sparrow caught a fish of 469 pounds (212.7 kg).

Each season up until 1939 saw fish of over 700 pounds (320 kg) being caught and the size of the specimens drew vast crowds. The town of Scarborough was transformed into a resort for the wealthy. A gentlemen's club the British Tunny Club was founded in 1933 and set up its headquarters there. The first president was Colonel (and, later, Sir) Edward Peel. A women's world tuna challenge cup was held at Scarborough for many years.

== High society ==
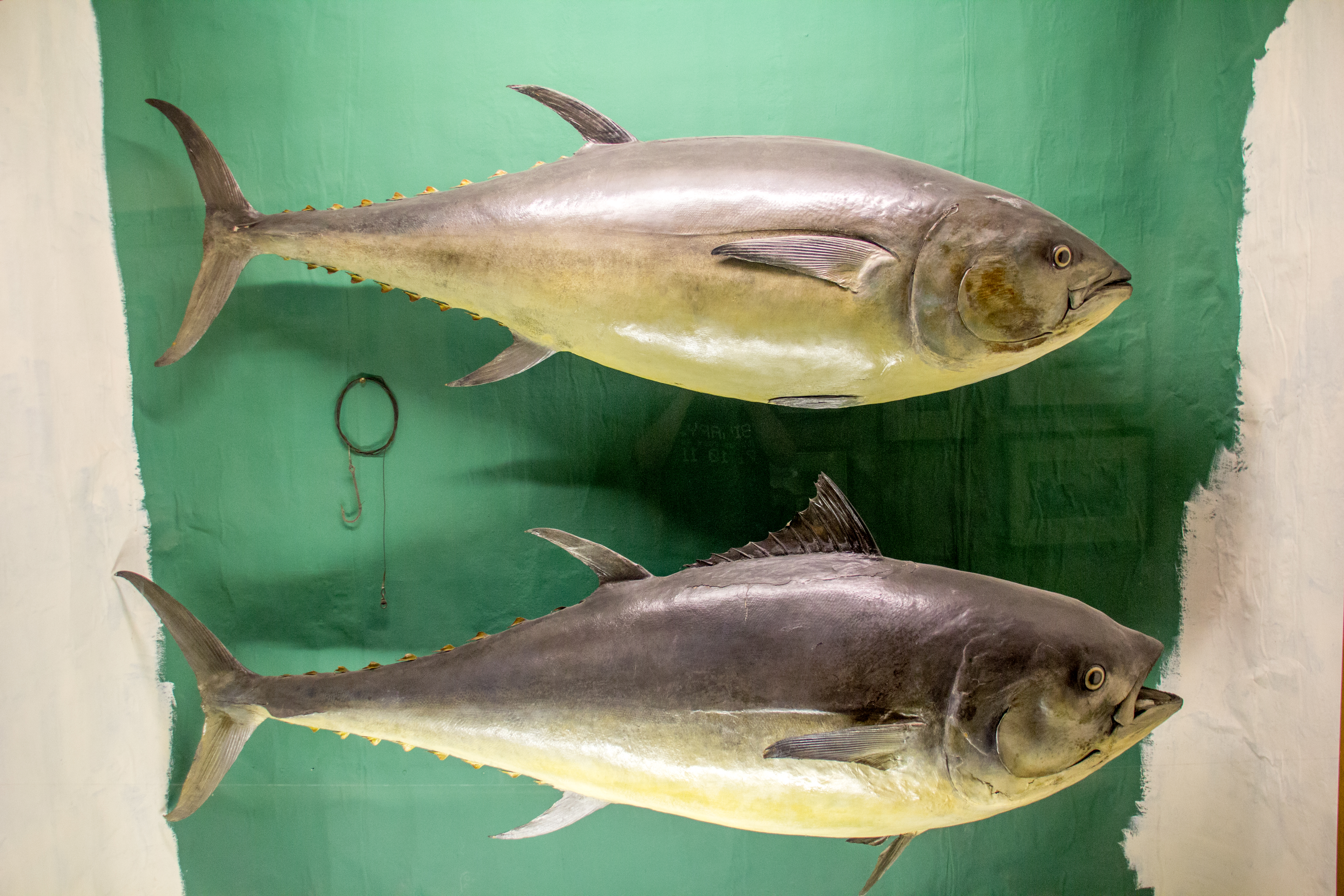
The two bluefin tuna caught by Lord Egerton, preserved at Tatton Park

Attracted by tales of the huge fish, high society turned its attention to Scarborough where sport was available only a few miles offshore. Special trains were run from London to bring the luminaries. Magazines published many sensational stories covering the personalities and the yachts that sailed to Scarborough. There were Lady Broughton, the African big-game hunter, who slept in a tent on the deck of her yacht; Colonel Sir Edward Peel of the wealthy aristocratic Peel family with his large Sudanese-crewed steam yacht St George; Lord Astor, the newspaper proprietor; Charles Laughton, the actor; Tommy Sopwith, who challenged for the America's Cup in 1934 and 1937; Lord Crathorne, later Chairman of the Conservative Party; and Lord Moyne of the Guinness family, later assassinated in Egypt.

Henri de Rothschild sailed in his 1000-ton yacht Eros but he personally chose to fish for dab whilst waiting for his guests to bring in tunny. Lord Egerton succeeded in catching a 691-pound (313 kg) and a 647-pound (293 kg) fish together on a single line. Colonel William Francis Henn, Chief Constable of Gloucestershire, was towed four miles in his coble by the 707-pound (321 kg) tunny he caught and Peel had to put about St George to search for him. Lady Yule, widow of Sir David Yule, sailed in her 1574-ton yacht Nahlin with her daughter Gladys, "said to be the richest heiress in the Empire". The yacht, which is now owned by Sir James Dyson, at the time had twelve bathrooms and a gymnasium.

== World and British tunny records ==
In 1932 Edward Peel landed a world-record tunny of 798 pounds (362.0 kg), capturing the record by 40 pounds (18.1 kg) from one caught off Nova Scotia by American champion Zane Grey. The British record which still stands is for a fish weighing 851 pounds (386.0 kg) caught off Scarborough in 1933 by Lorenzo Mitchell-Henry but in 1949 a larger fish weighing 852 pounds (386.5 kg) was taken on a 160-pound (73 kg) line by a Lincolnshire farmer John Hedley Lewis. An objection from Mitchell-Henry was sustained on grounds that the rope from which the fish was hung was wet and therefore excessively heavy.

In 1947 Dr Bidi Evans fishing from her father's yacht caught a 714-pound (324 kg) tunny with which she still holds the British women's record. The last tunny to be caught was in 1954 since which time none has been caught off the coast of Great Britain.

== Rise and decline of North Sea tunny ==
The discovery of tunny raised the question as to whether they had been around but undiscovered all the time. Colonel Peel was interested in marine biology and he made his yacht St George available to Frederick Russell for investigating the fishes' movements in the North Sea. Although local fishermen considered there had been no tunny before World War I, these studies suggested that migration into the North Sea had not been recent. There are photographs of Peel and Russell engaged on this study.

World War II interrupted fishing and after the war the technical developments in commercial fishing in the North Sea reduced herring and mackerel stocks and led to the disappearance of tunny.

In 2000 a 76-year-old pensioner using a fishing rod for the first time landed the largest tuna caught off the British Isles for nearly 50 years. Off the north-west coast of Ireland Alan Glanville caught a 353-pound (160 kg) fish and next day caught one of 529 pounds (240 kg). In 2001 a 968-pound (439 kg) bluefin tuna was caught off the Irish coast in County Donegal – a European record for any fish caught on rod and line.
