= Northeastern United States Continental Shelf =

North American marine ecosystem

The Northeastern United States Continental Shelf (NEUS) is the large marine ecosystem designated by the United States National Oceanic and Atmospheric Administration that occupies the portion of the continental shelf of the Atlantic Ocean. The NEUS is defined as extending roughly from the Canadian province of Nova Scotia to Cape Hatteras in the US state of North Carolina. This large marine ecosystem is notable for its proximity to the Gulf Stream current, meridional variation of climate, and commercial fisheries.

== Climate ==
The NEUS Continental Shelf can be generally divided into two regions: the Gulf of Maine section, and that of the Mid-Atlantic Bight. The Gulf of Maine subsection of the NEUS Continental Shelf is characterized by relatively mild summers and long, cold winters. The Gulf of Maine's climate is mostly a mild summer climate (Dfb) as defined in the Köppen climate classification, with a small area of humid continental hot summer climate (Dfa) in the state of Massachusetts. The Mid Atlantic Bight section is more diverse in its climate, and is generally characterized by longer, warmer summers and milder winters than the Gulf of Maine. At the northern extreme of the Mid Atlantic Bight, Dfa and Dfb climates dominate in coastal Massachusetts, Rhode Island, Connecticut, and Long Island. From New York City to southern New Jersey, the climate is a mix of Dfa and Humid Subtropical (Cfa). From Delaware to the southern extreme in North Carolina, the Mid Atlantic Bight climate is entirely composed of a Cfa climate. The water in the Mid Atlantic Bight is also closely affected by the Gulf Stream, which moves large quantities of heat from low to high latitudes, warming the waters of the Mid Atlantic Bight, whereas the Gulf of Maine is further from the main path of the Gulf Stream, and thereby sees less direct influence from it.

== Geography ==
The Gulf of Maine is considered to be a relatively deep body of water, with an average depth of 490 feet (150 meters) and a maximum depth of 1236 feet (377) meters. Its southern border is defined by the Georges Bank, a shallow underwater plateau located offshore that forms a basin in the central Gulf of Maine. The Georges Bank restricts water movement into the gulf by the Great South and Northeast channels that bisect the George's Bank. By contrast, the Mid Atlantic Bight's depth generally increases with distance from shore, and is less deep than the Gulf of Maine. At most locations of the Mid Atlantic Bight that are closer to shore than 100 km (62 mi), the Mid Atlantic Bight is less than 100 m (330 ft), and has a maximum depth of 375 m (1,230 ft) at the most seaward locations of the Mid Atlantic Bight. The Mid Atlantic Bight also includes several large estuaries, such as Chesapeake Bay, whose average depth is less than 10 meters, and Long Island Sound with an average depth of around 20 meters.

== Ecology ==
The Gulf of Maine is considered to be a cold water ecosystem, with typical surface temperatures of 10 °C in the winter to 17 °C in the summer. The cold Labrador Current and eddies of the Gulf Stream create a well mixed environment that has high levels of nutrients. The Gulf of Maine is home to around 3200 species of macrofauna in total. Cape Cod also acts as a barrier to migration, meaning that most coastal aquatic species in the Gulf of Maine are absent in other parts of the coastal United States. The Gulf of Maine is the southern limit of the northern shrimp (Pandalus borealus), a circumpolar shrimp that breeds in the Gulf of Maine in the winter. Spring is intensely productive, with phytoplankton blooming in large volumes. This high productivity supports large numbers of commercially important species, such as lobster, cod, monkfish, and winter flounder.

The Mid Atlantic Bight's ecosystem can be seen as a transitional ecosystem between that of temperate and tropical ocean. Like the Gulf of Maine, it is an area of relatively high primary production. Much of the primary production in the Mid Atlantic Bight is in the summer and winter, and is highest near shore, and in estuarine environments. The shelf break is home to a large number of corals and sea fans, most of which are found at depths of greater than 50 m. The bight is also an important migratory pathway for the humpback whale, fin whale, and the critically endangered North Atlantic right whale. It is also home to five species of sea turtle: the loggerhead sea turtle, Kemp's ridley sea turtle, leatherback sea turtle, hawksbill sea turtle, and green sea turtle; all of which are protected under the Endangered Species Act. The majority of sampled benthic biomass was composed of sea scallops, with horseshoe crab and Atlantic blue crab also being important. Important fish include scup, Atlantic croaker, bluefish, and striped bass.

== Human interaction and impacts ==
The NEUS Continental Shelf Ecosystem is home to several commercially important species. In 2017, Maine lobster was the single most valuable commercial fish species in the United States, and was estimated to be worth $637 million. In the Mid Atlantic Bight section of the NEUS continental shelf, the state of Virginia had the third highest volume of landed fish of any state in the year 2017, superseded only by the states of Alaska and Louisiana, with a total landing of 344 million pounds, worth $183 million. The top three most important species were sea scallops, oyster, and blue crab. Anthropogenic pollution is a problem in the NEUS continental shelf. The Chesapeake Bay is particularly affected by excess nitrogen and phosphorus contamination from sewage, which is a cause of harmful algal blooms, which can rapidly deplete available oxygen from the water column. Microplastic pollution is a widespread problem in the North Atlantic Ocean; in 2018, samples of pelagic fish species native to the NEUS Continental Shelf sampled from Portugal found microplastic contamination in 49% of the fish. Ocean acidification is also a threat to the NEUS ecosystem, particularly organisms with carbonate shells. A study conducted by NOAA concluded that carbon dioxide can enter the North Atlantic Ocean at a more rapid rate and to greater depths than occurs in the North Pacific.
