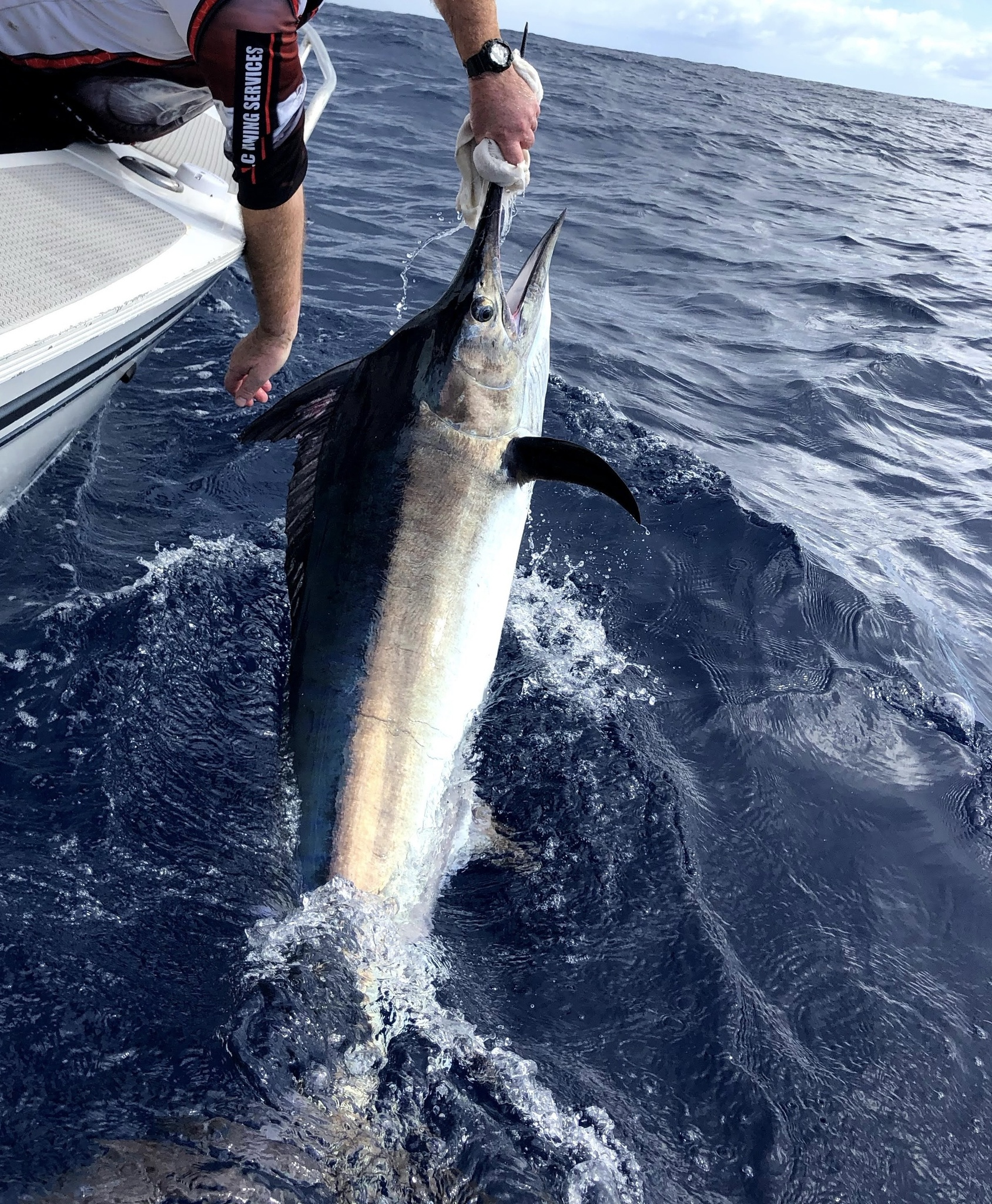

Conservation status
- Data Deficient (IUCN 3.1)

Scientific classification
- Kingdom: Animalia
- Phylum: Chordata
- Class: Actinopterygii
- Division: Teleostei
- Order: Carangiformes
- Family: Istiophoridae
- Genus: Istiompax; Whitley, 1931
- Species: I. indica

Binomial name
- Istiompax indica (G. Cuvier, 1832)
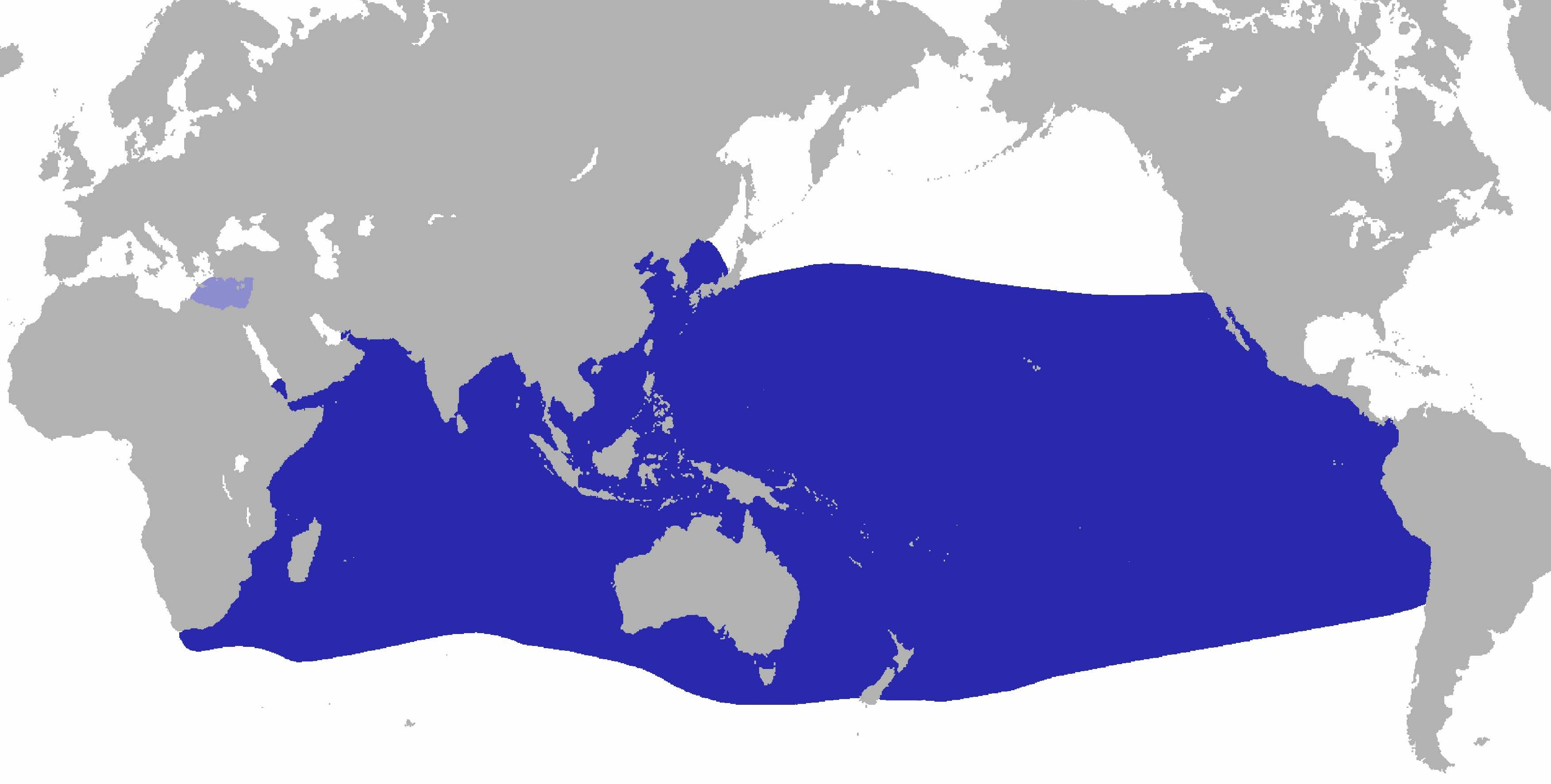
- Distribution of black marlin (blue), with vagrant individuals occasionally found in the Eastern Mediterranean (light blue)

Synonyms
- List: Tetrapturus indicus G. Cuvier, 1832; Istiomax indicus (G. Cuvier, 1832); Istiompax indicus (G. Cuvier, 1832); Makaira indica (G. Cuvier, 1832); Tetrapterus australis (sic) Macleay, 1854; Makaira australis (Macleay, 1854); Tetrapturus australis Macleay, 1854; Histiophorus brevirostris (sic) Playfair, 1867; Istiompax brevirostris (Playfair, 1867); Makaira brevirostris (Playfair, 1867); Tetrapturus brevirostris (Playfair, 1867); Makaira marlina D. S. Jordan & Hill, 1926; Istiompax marlina (D. S. Jordan & Hill, 1926); Makaira ampla marlina D. S. Jordan & Hill, 1926; Makaira marlina marlina D. S. Jordan & Hill, 1926; Makaira nigricans marlina D. S. Jordan & Hill, 1926; Marlina marlina (D. S. Jordan & Hill, 1926); Istiompax australis Whitley, 1931; Makaira nigricans tahitiensis Nichols & La Monte, 1935; Makaira ampla tahitiensis Nichols & La Monte, 1935; Makaira marlina tahitiensis Nichols & La Monte, 1935; Makaira mazara tahitiensis Nichols & La Monte, 1935; Istiompax dombraini Whitley, 1954; Makaira xantholineata Deraniyagala, 1956

= Black marlin =

Species of fish

The black marlin (Istiompax indica) is a species of marlin found in tropical and subtropical areas of the Indian and Pacific Oceans approximately between 40 degrees North and 45 degrees South, while in some instances venturing into more temperate waters. Reaching lengths of over 4.5 m (15 ft), it is one of the largest marlins and also one of the largest bony fish. Marlins are among the fastest fish, but speeds are often exaggerated in popular media, such as reports of 129 km/h (80 mph). A 2016 study estimated maximum swimming speeds from muscle contraction times, which in turn limit the tail-beat frequency; the study suggested a theoretical upper limit for the black marlin's burst speed of 36 km/h (22 mph).

Black marlin are fished commercially and are also a highly prized game fish. Black marlins were known to drag ancient Maldivian fishing boats for very long distances after being hooked, until the marlins finally tired; it would take many hours for the fishermen to row or sail back home. Due to the common misidentification of large billfish such as the black marlin, as well as its highly migratory habits and the lack of research into the species, much about populations are unknown. The species was first known as Tetrapturus indicus and later was reclassified as Makaira indica before taking on its current scientific name. One of the earliest scientific records of black marlin is its description by French zoologist Georges Cuvier in 1832.

== Description ==
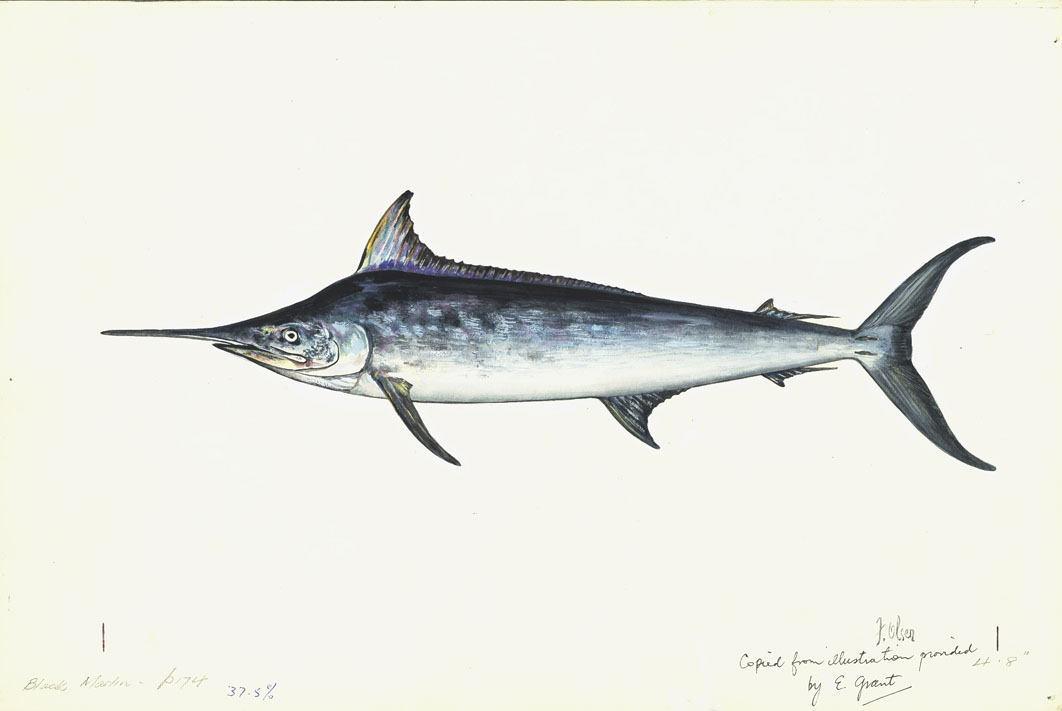
Image of a black marlin done by Frank Olsen

Compared to striped or white marlins and sailfish, black marlins are more solid than their blue counterparts. They have a shorter, heavier bill and a rounder and lower dorsal fin. Black marlin may be distinguished from all other marlin species by their rigid pectoral fins, which, especially from a weight of around 68 kg (150 lb), are unable to be pressed flat against their sides but can be tilted further backwards for reduced drag. The black marlin showcases an extremely chrome underside and a dark blue-black dorsal side, the two colored layers are often separated by a yellow-ish chrome stripe. The black marlin is the only istiophorid in which the second dorsal fin is anterior to the second anal fin, this feature holds for all sizes. Black marlin are measured like other bill fish from the tip of their lower jaw to the fork of their tail.

The black marlin is also the biggest marlin as well as one of the largest bony fishes in the world with females capable of exceeding 700 kg (1,500 lb). The maximum published length is 4.65 m (15 ft 3 in), however the average growth was found to be approximately 6-9ft. Females tend to be larger than males after about age 5, however before age 5 the females are smaller. The maximum weight is 750 kg (1,650 lb), possibly up to 900 kg (2,000 lb). Juveniles are similar in most features except their coloration is lighter, bills are shorter and they are physically smaller.

=== Key distinctions from other billfishes ===
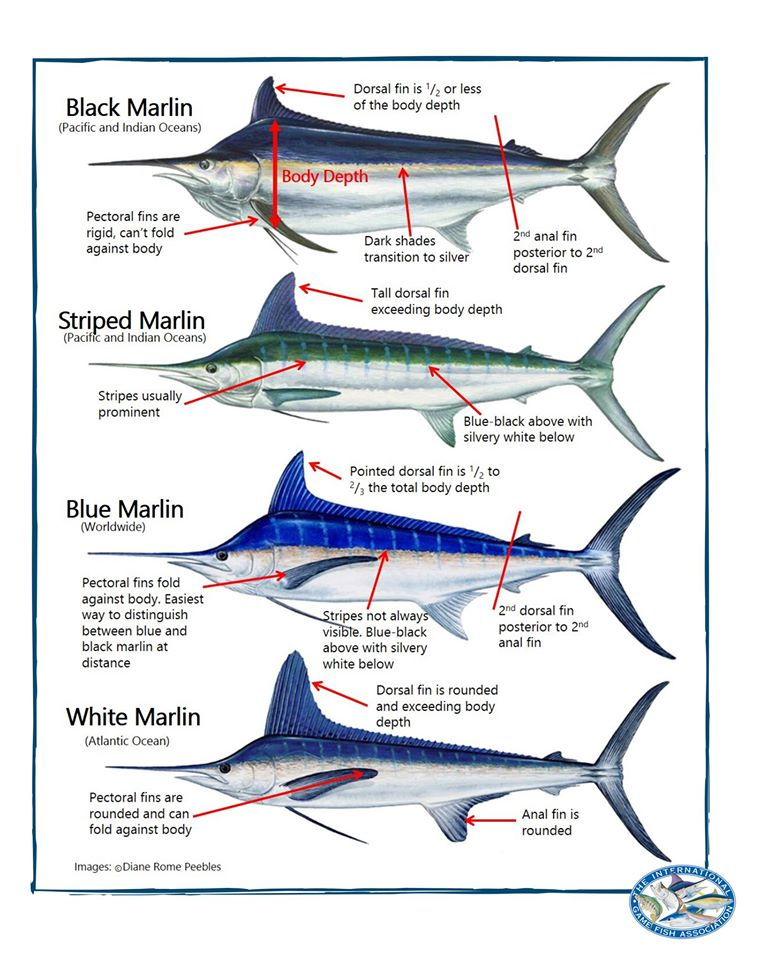
A comparison of the 4 types of marlin made by the International Game Fish Association

There are 4 types of marlin, and the most obvious distinguishing traits of black marlin are their large size and deep body depth; other marlin have a more slender body with less distance from back to stomach. The blue marlin looks very similar to the black marlin, but its pectoral fins are angled more laterally, whereas the black marlin's fins face more ventrally; black marlins are also larger and do not have the faint light blue vertical stripes that are visible on blue marlins. The black marlin could be confused for striped marlin; however, a distinct difference between the two is the highly prominent vertical white lines on the striped marlin, which the black marlin lacks. White marlins also have defined white stripes that distinguish them from black marlins.

== Biology ==
=== Diet ===
French naturalist Georges Cuvier described the black marlin in 1832 as Tetrapturus indicus. Diet mostly consists of various fish and cephalopods. They may eat tuna, mackerel, snake mackerel, flying fish, squid, crustaceans, octopus, etc, but mackerel scad have been found to be the preferred prey of black marlin. Scientists have even found young sharks in the stomachs of some black marlin. When black marlin hunt prey they swallow the prey head first. Prey observed from the stomachs of black marlins often show slashes from the bill of the fish. Because of this, it is believed that these fish utilize their bills when hunting within a school of fish.

=== Reproduction ===
Black marlin spawn at different times depending on their location. Spawning around southern Asia has been observed in May and June, around Taiwan from March through April as well as from August to October, and around Australia between October and December. Spawning has also been noted from August to November around northern Australia. Black marlin are believed to prefer water temperatures around 27° to 28°C during spawning. Egg counts of ripe roe totaled about 40 million per female.

=== Habitat preference ===
Black marlins spend more time closer to the surface than most other billfish, except for sailfish. Scientists found in one population of black marlin that at night the fish would spend up to 87% of their time at depths above 30 meters deep, but during the day less than 60% of their time was spent in the upper 30 meter depths of the sea. Because of this, black marlin distribution is influenced by the surface height of the ocean throughout the time of year. Black Marlin live in temperatures from 15 degrees Celsius to 30 degrees Celsius. Juvenile black marlin around Australia utilize the great barrier reef lagoon as an area to grow and develop due to an abundance of resources. During the younger life stages, black marlin will form seasonal aggregations (aggregation: temporary assemblage of individuals) throughout the great barrier reef lagoon.

=== Sexual dimorphism ===
Female black marlin are often larger than males after age 5, they have also been found to live longer than males. In Taiwan, data from studies have provided evidence from population samples that there is likely a larger female to male ratio.

== Conservation status ==
The conservation status of the black marlin is unknown. Due to the migratory nature of these fish and a lack of research, the population size and health cannot be accurately stated. Research into black marlin runs into many complications regarding finding them consistently. One such problem is that they are particularly good at ditching their trackers. The Billfish Conservation Act was passed in 2012 and has been amended as recently as 2018 outlawing the sale of billfish throughout the United States (except swordfish), this act does not outlaw fishing for such fish but only the sale. There are currently no fisheries for black marlin.

== Distribution ==
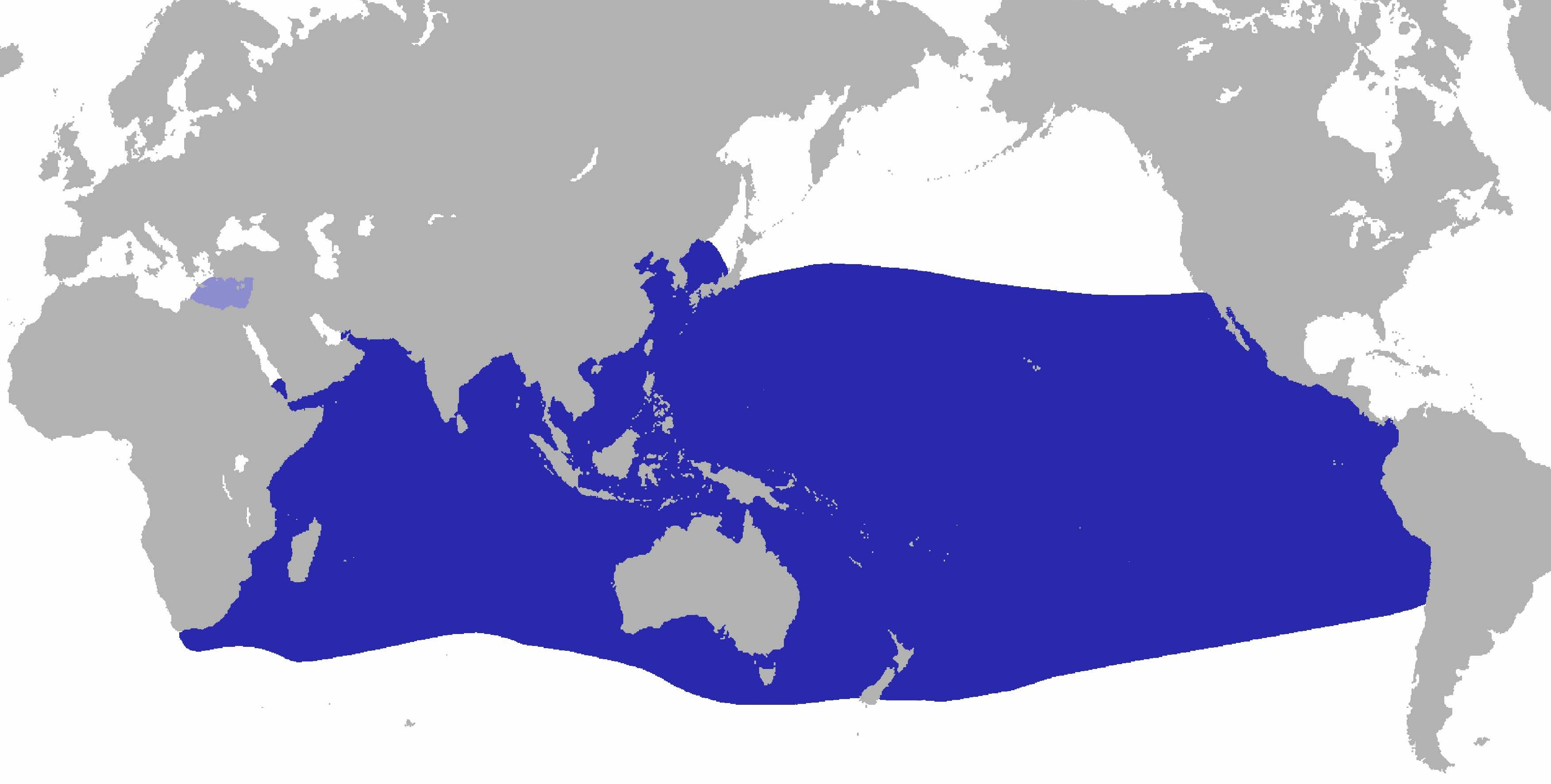
Distribution of black marlin on a world map (distribution is highlighted in blue)

The species occurs in the tropical and subtropical Indo-Pacific approximately between 40 degrees North and 45 degrees South, with uncommon movements into temperate waters, and rare reports from the Atlantic. There has been no evidence to suggest that there is a breeding population in the Atlantic. They are found anywhere from surface level down to depths of approximately 500 meters. The relative abundance of black marlin is currently unknown. In Taiwan, data from studies have provided evidence from population samples that there is likely a larger female to male ratio.

== Human interaction ==
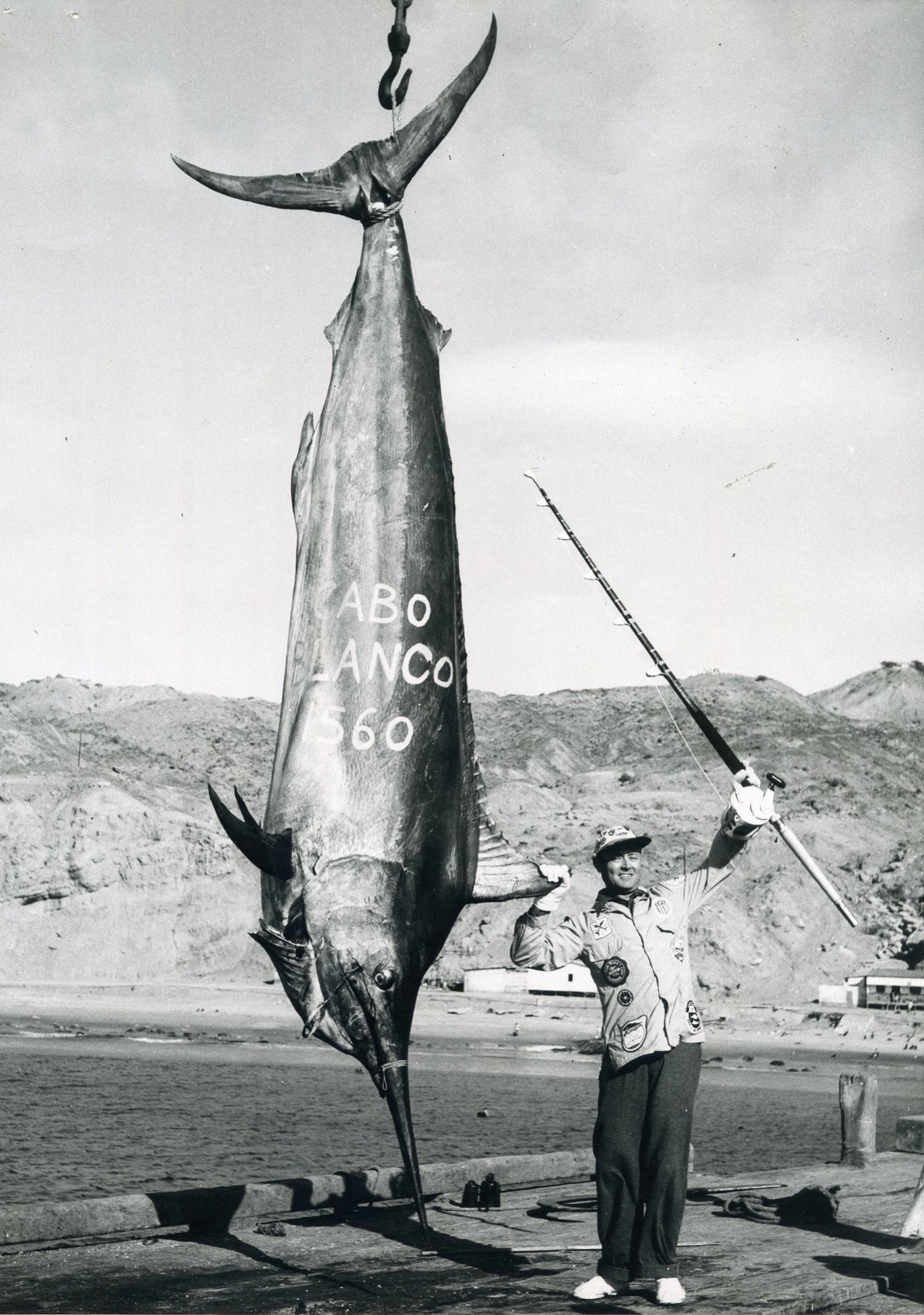
Alfred C. Glassell Jr. with his record-breaking black marlin caught in 1953 at Cabo Blanco, Peru

Black marlin are a very popular big game fish. They are commonly fished along the coasts of South America, Southern Asia, and Australia. Recreational angling is a large market throughout the world and the black marlin is a very sought after fish. In August 1953, while fishing off of Cabo Blanco, Peru, Alfred C. Glassell Jr. caught a black marlin weighing 1,560 pounds (710 kg), using a handheld 7 foot (2.1 m) bamboo rod, a Fin-Nor reel and 130-pound-test linen line. As of 2023 this remained a record catch under International Game Fish Association rules. The black marlin caught by Alfred C. Glassell Jr. is stuffed and can be viewed in the National History Museum in Washington, D.C.

== See also ==
- Billfish in the Indian Ocean
