= Cabo Blanco, Peru =

Fishing village in Peru

Coordinates: 4°15′05″S 81°14′06″W

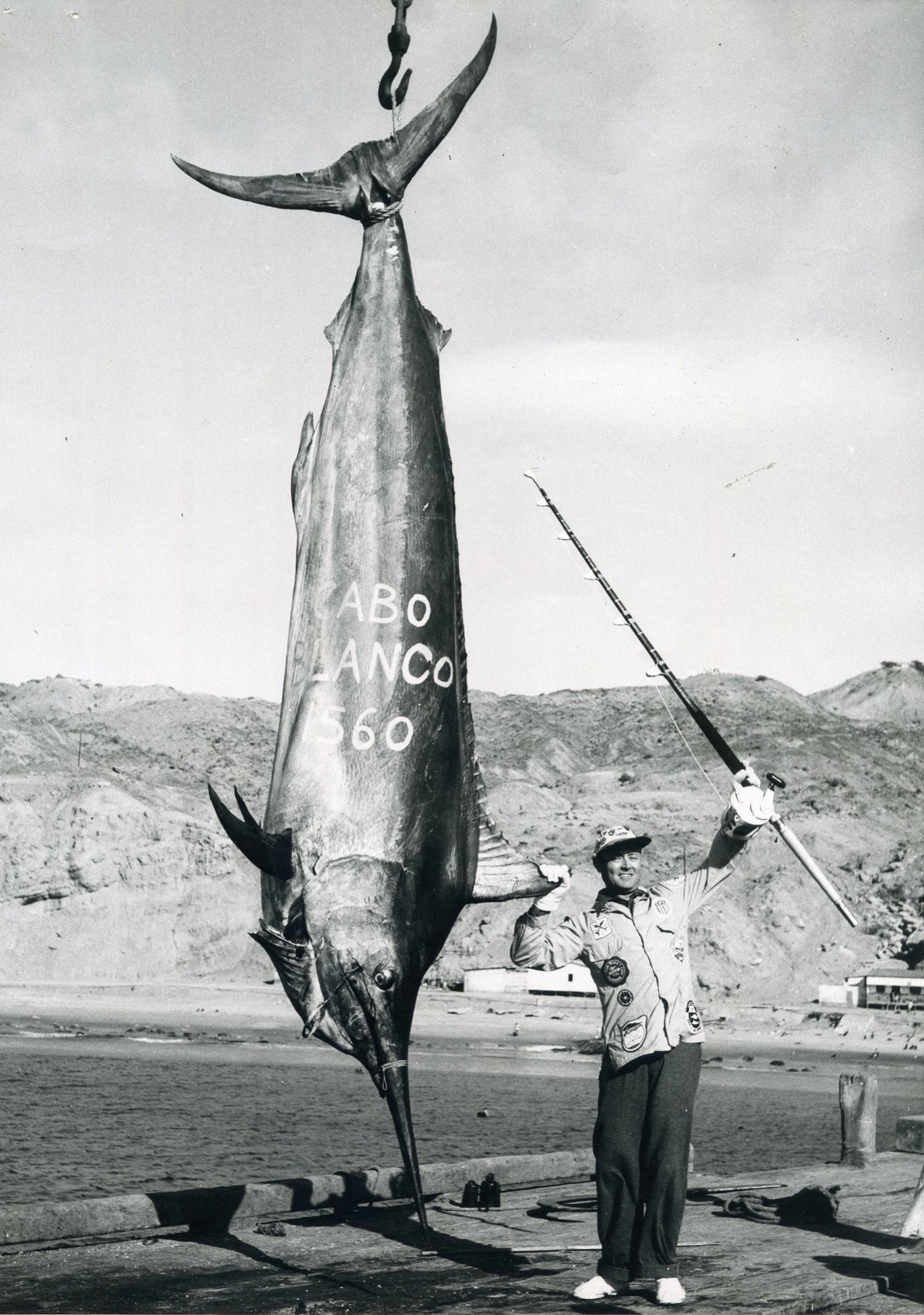
Record-breaking black marlin weighing at 1,560 pounds (710 kg), caught off Cabo Blanco in 1953 by Alfred C. Glassell Jr.

Cabo Blanco is a fishing village in northwestern Peru, 3 km northwest from El Alto, Talara, Piura. It was famous in the past among big-game fishermen and today is a noted surf break. The village takes its name from the light coloured nearby mountains. Cabo Blanco is one of the surfing spots in northern Peru with waves suitable for surfing all year round, along with other surf spots such as Chicama, Huanchaco, Pacasmayo, and Lobitos.

In the 1950s and 1960s, fishermen traveled to Cabo Blanco to hunt big marlin. Ernest Hemingway stayed more than a month at the famous "Cabo Blanco Fishing Club" and caught a 700-pound marlin while filming the motion picture based on his novel, The Old Man and the Sea.

In 1952, model Patsy Pulitzer appeared in Sports Illustrated as one of the "World's Loveliest Sportswomen", after catching a 1,230-pound black marlin off Cabo Blanco, a then world-record fish for a woman. In 1953, Alfred C. Glassell Jr. caught the IGFA all tackle world record black marlin, weighing 1,560 pounds (710 kg).

In 1979, Peruvian surfer Gordo Barreda discovered the wave when he visited the village to check the surf in the area. The wave is a hollow powerful left and is reckoned the "Peruvian Pipeline", referring to the Banzai Pipeline in Hawaii. Swell from Hawaii does in fact go on to reach Peru; in the 1990s the best way to get a surf forecast was to phone Hawaii and whatever swell they had would arrive about 5 days later.

The wave breaks over sand and rock, with the sand building up through summer and being washed away progressively by winter swells. The wave inspires a kind of fanaticism among surfers. Although there are only about 20 locals, crowds of surfers are drawn to the wave from Lima (700 kilometres south), and from around the world. With modern swell forecasts and the internet, it's easy to know when swell is on the way, and the surfers once there all pack into a single tight takeoff zone, despite other waves elsewhere in the area.

A concrete pier was built for local fishermen a few years ago, replacing a wooden one which was between Cabo and Panic Point and was destroyed by the sea. The proposal had been to build it right through the takeoff zone of the Cabo wave, ruining the wave, but also being a difficult place to build. A compromise was reached, and the pier was built about 150 metres north, but it still chops off the tail end of the ride.

Cabo Blanco was used as the location of the film Undertow (Contracorriente), directed by Javier Fuentes-León. The movie was released in 2010.
