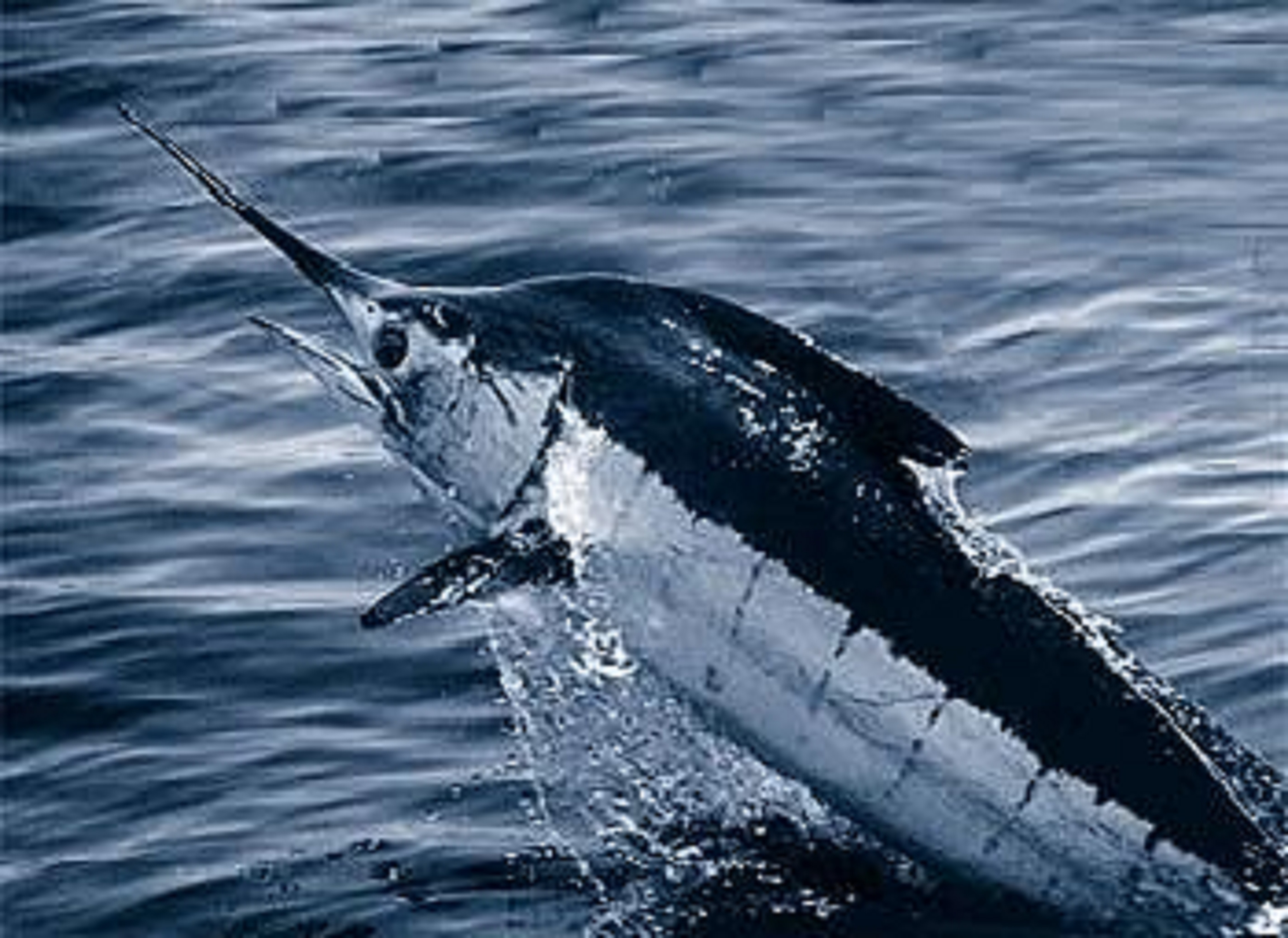
- Male

Conservation status
- Vulnerable (IUCN 3.1)

Scientific classification
- Kingdom: Animalia
- Phylum: Chordata
- Class: Actinopterygii
- Order: Carangiformes
- Family: Istiophoridae
- Genus: Makaira
- Species: M. nigricans

Binomial name
- Makaira nigricans Lacépède, 1802
- The range of the Atlantic blue marlin

Synonyms
- See below

= Atlantic blue marlin =

Species of fish

The Atlantic blue marlin (Makaira nigricans) is a species of marlin endemic to the Atlantic Ocean. It is closely related to, and usually considered conspecific with, the Indo-Pacific blue marlin, then simply called blue marlin. Some authorities consider both species distinct. Blue marlin are distributed throughout the tropical and subtropical waters of the Atlantic Ocean. It is a bluewater fish that spends the majority of its life in the open sea far from land.

The blue marlin preys on a wide variety of marine organisms, mostly near the surface, often using its bill to stun or injure its prey then returning to eat the injured or stunned fish. Females can grow up to four times the weight of males. The maximum published weight is 818 kg (1,803 lb) and length 5 m (16.4 ft). Greater lengths have been claimed unofficially. Estimates of the maximum swimming speed of the blue marlin commonly go as high as 72 km/h, though the casual swimming speed at which it moves most of the time is under 4.5 km/h.

They are sought after as a highly prized game fish by anglers and are taken by commercial fishermen, both as a directed catch and as bycatch in major industrial tuna fisheries. Blue marlin are currently considered a threatened species by the IUCN due to overfishing, particularly in the international waters off the coast of Portugal where they migrate to breed in the June/July months. Some other historic English names for the blue marlin are Cuban black marlin, ocean gar, and ocean guard. The relatively high fat content of its meat makes it commercially valuable in certain markets. It is the national fish of the Commonwealth of The Bahamas and is featured on its coat of arms.

== Taxonomy and naming ==
The blue marlin is placed in the genus Makaira. This name is derived from the Greek word machaira, meaning "a short sword or bent dagger", and the Latin machaera, "sword". The specific epithet nigricans is Latin for "becoming black". The blue marlin is part of the billfish family Istiophoridae which is in the jack order Carangiformes. In addition, it is in the suborder Xiphioidei and is a member of the subclass Neopterygii, which means "new wings". It is also in the class of Actinopterygii, which includes ray-finned fishes and spiny-rayed fishes, and the superclass Osteichthyes, which includes all of the bony fishes.

The classification of the Atlantic blue marlin (M. nigricans) and the Indo-Pacific blue marlin (M. mazara) as separate species is under debate. Genetic data suggest, although the two groups are isolated from each other, they are both the same species, with the only genetic exchange occurring when Indo-Pacific blue marlin migrate to and contribute genes to the Atlantic population. A separate study by V. P. Buonaccorsi, J. R. Mcdowell, and Graves indicated that both Indo-Pacific and Atlantic show "striking phylogeographic partitioning" of mitochondrial and microsatellite loci.

=== Synonyms ===
Synonyms of M. nigricans are:

- Maikaira nigricans (sic) Lacepède, 1802
- Makaira nigricans nigricans Lacepède, 1802
- Xiphias ensis Lacepède, 1800 (ambiguous)
- Makaira ensis (Lacepède, 1800) (ambiguous)
- Tetrapturus herschelii J. E. Gray, 1838
- Histiophorus herschelii (J. E. Gray, 1838)
- Makaira herschelii (J. E. Gray, 1838)
- Tetrapturus amplus Poey, 1860
- Makaira ampla (Poey, 1860)
- Makaira ampla ampla (Poey, 1860)
- Makaira nigricans ampla (Poey, 1860)
- Makaira bermudae Mowbray, 1931
- Orthocraeros bermudae (Mowbray, 1931)
- Eumakaira nigra Hirasaka & H. Nakamura, 1947
- Makaira nigra (Hirasaka & H. Nakamura, 1947)
- Makaira perezi F. de Buen, 1950
- Istiompax howardi Whitley, 1954

== Description ==
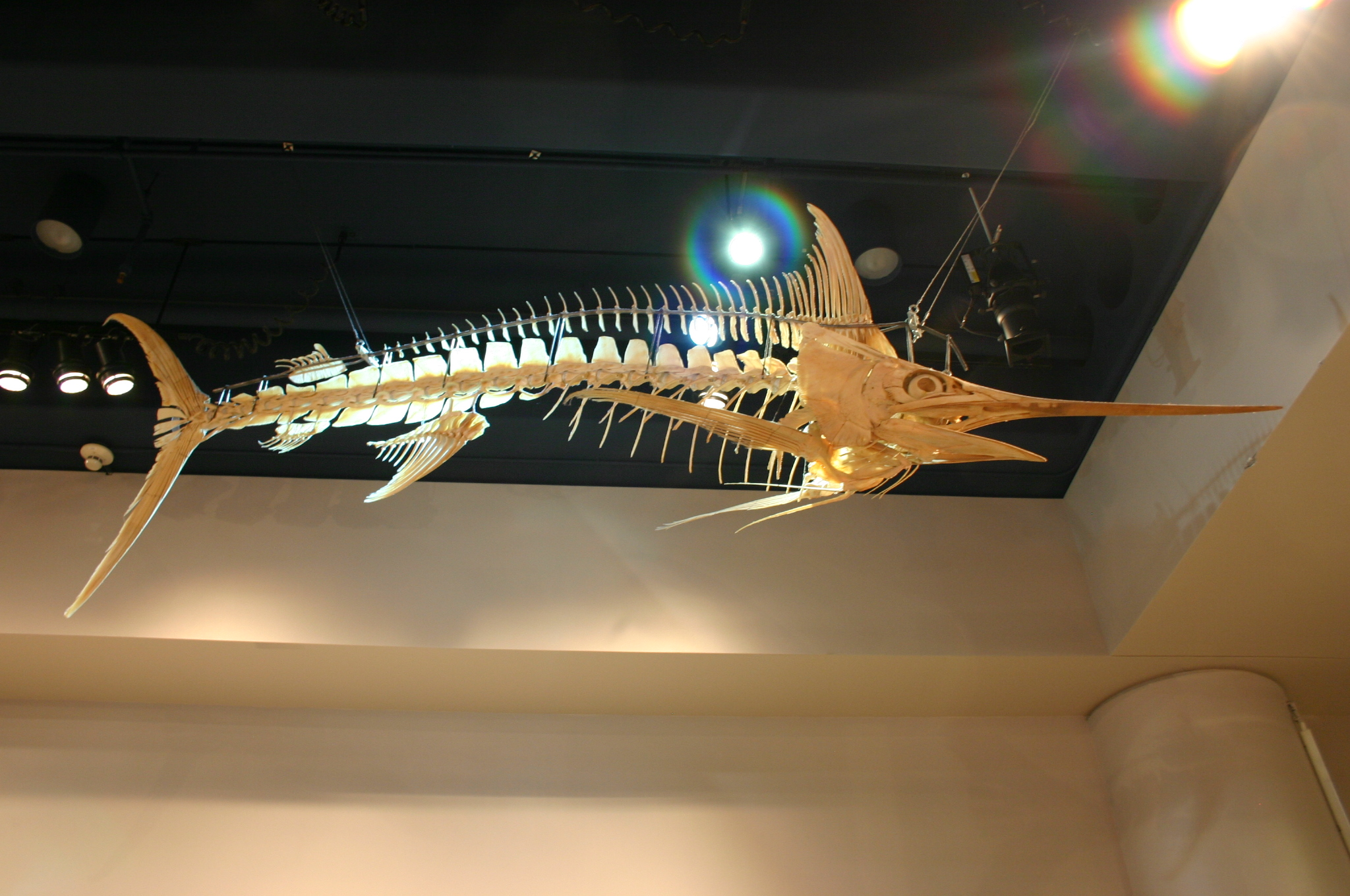
Intact fish skeleton at the North Carolina Museum of Natural Sciences

The biggest females are more than four times as heavy as the biggest males, which rarely exceed 160 kg (350 lb) in weight. The longest females can reach a length of 5 m (16 ft) with the bill, from eye to tip, constituting about 20% of the total body length.

Body mass in the largest female specimens has been reported from 540 to 820 kg (1,190 to 1,810 lb), depending on the source (few large specimens are scientifically verified). The largest blue marlin caught by IGFA angling rules is from Vitoria, Brazil, which weighed 1,402 lb (636 kg).; fishermen often refer to individual marlins that reach or exceed 1,000 pounds as "granders".

Both sexes have 24 vertebrae, of which 11 are precaudal and 13 are caudal.

The marlin has two dorsal fins and two anal fins. The fins are supported by bony spines known as rays. Its first dorsal fin has 39 to 43 rays from front to back. Its second dorsal fin has six or seven rays. Its first anal fin, which is similar in shape and size to the second dorsal fin, has 13 to 16 rays, and the second anal fin has six or seven rays. The pectoral fins, which have 19 to 22 rays, are long and narrow and can be drawn in to the sides of the body. The pelvic fins are shorter than the pectorals, have a poorly developed membrane, and are depressible into ventral grooves. Its first anal fin, along with its pectoral and caudal fins, can be folded into grooves. This streamlines the fish and thereby reduces drag.

Blue marlin, like other billfish, can rapidly change color, an effect created by pigment-containing iridophores and light-reflecting skin cells.

Most often, however, the body is blue-black on top with a silvery white underside. It has about 15 rows of pale, cobalt-colored stripes, each of which has round dots and/or thin bars, located on both sides of the fish. The first dorsal fin membrane is dark blue or almost black and has no dots or marks. Other fins are normally brownish-black, sometimes with a hint of dark blue. The bases of the first and second anal fins have a hint of silvery white.

The body is covered with thick, bony, elongated scales that have one, two, or three posterior points, with one being the most common form.

The bill is long and stout. Both the jaws and the palatines (the roof of the mouth) are covered with small, file-like teeth. The lateral line system is a group of neuromasts rooted in lateral line canals that can sense weak water motions and large changes in pressure. It has the appearance of a net. It is obvious in immature specimens but unclear in adults, becoming progressively embedded in the skin. The anus is just in front of the origin of the first anal fin.

== Range and migration ==
Blue marlin are found year-round in tropical oceanic waters of the Atlantic. The range expands into temperate waters of the Northern and Southern Hemispheres during the warmer months and contracts towards the Equator during colder months. Warm currents, such as the Gulf Stream, in the western Atlantic have a major influence on their seasonal distribution.

Being the most tropic of all the billfishes, they spend a lot of time in the water column shifting from the top to a depth of 100 meters. They spend most nights near the surface and dive to deeper depths during the day. Limited from going any lower by the water temperature and oxygen levels.

The blue marlin's latitudinal range extends from about 45°N to about 35°S. It is less abundant in the eastern Atlantic, where it mostly occurs off Africa between the latitudes of 25°N and 25°S. The largest numbers are usually found in waters warmer than 24 °C (75 °F), but blue marlin have been found at surface water temperatures as high as 30.5 °C (86.9 °F) and as low as 21.7 °C (71.1 °F).

Tagging studies, using conventional "spaghetti" tags, and more recently pop-up satellite tags, have given researchers a glimpse into blue marlin migration patterns and habits. Recaptures of tagged fish have shown multiple movements between the Caribbean Islands and Venezuela and the Bahamas, as well as between the Caribbean Saint Thomas, U.S. Virgin Islands and West Africa, and interocean travel. Most notably, a blue marlin tagged off the coast of Delaware was recovered near the island of Mauritius off the southeast coast of Africa in the Indian Ocean – a voyage of 9,254 miles. Several fish have been recaptured in the same general area where they were tagged, implying reverse migration after/over several years, but the data are insufficient to accurately determine seasonality.

== Predators and parasites ==
Once blue marlin reach maturity, they have few predators, with the most important being killer whales and large pelagic sharks, such as the shortfin mako and great white shark.

Blue marlin have many parasites, including from these groups: Digenea (flukes), Didymozoidea (tissue flukes), Monogenea (gillworms), Cestoda (tapeworms), Nematoda (roundworms), Acanthocephala (spiny-headed worms), copepods, barnacles, and cookiecutter sharks.

== Lifecycle ==
=== Growth and maturity ===
Atlantic blue marlin reach sexual maturity at the age of two to four years. Males reach sexual maturity at a weight of 35–44 kg (77–97 lb) and females at 47–61 kg (104–134 lb). Blue marlin breed in late summer and fall. Females may spawn as many as four times in one season. They often release over seven million eggs at once, each about 1 mm (0.039 in) in diameter. Few reach sexual maturity. The planktonic young drift freely in the ocean's pelagic zone. Larvae inhabit the west central Atlantic off the Southern United States, Jamaica, The Bahamas, the Dominican Republic, and Puerto Rico, and also the southwest Atlantic off Brazil. The larvae may grow as much as 16 mm (0.63 in) in a day. On their sides and dorsal surfaces, they are blue-black in color, while ventrally they are white. Both the caudal fin and the caudal peduncle (the narrow part of the fish's body to which the caudal or tail fin is attached) are clear. Two iridescent blue patches occur on the head, and some individuals have darker spots on their backs. In adolescents, the first dorsal fin is large and concave, gradually reducing in proportion to body size with continued growth. Males may live for 18 years, and females up to 27.

=== Diet and feeding ===
The larvae feed upon a variety of zooplankton along with drifting fish eggs and other larvae. They progress to feeding on a wide range of fishes, particularly scombrids, such as mackerel and tuna, squid, and especially near oceanic islands and coral reefs, on juvenile inshore fish. Studies of stomach contents have found that smaller schooling scombrids such as frigate mackerel, bullet tuna, and skipjack tuna make up a substantial proportion of their diet. Squid and deep-sea fishes such as pomfret and snake mackerel are also important prey items in certain areas. Blue marlin have been recorded to take prey as large as white marlin, as well as yellowfin and bigeye tuna in the 100-lb range. Conversely, they are also capable of feeding on small but numerous prey such as filefish and snipefish.

Scientists and fishermen have long debated the extent to which blue marlin and other billfish use their elongated upper jaw in feeding. A 2007 Japanese study of stomach contents of fish captured in a commercial trolling fishery found that 130 undigested prey items obtained from 227 blue marlin had spearing, slashing, and other injuries that were judged to have been inflicted by the bill.

=== Bioaccumulation ===
Heavy metals have been known to accumulate in the Atlantic blue marlin, a process known as bioaccumulation. In 2017, the Texas Parks and Wildlife Department issued a consumption advisory for all blue marlin caught along the coast of Texas based on the presence of mercury.

== Economic importance ==
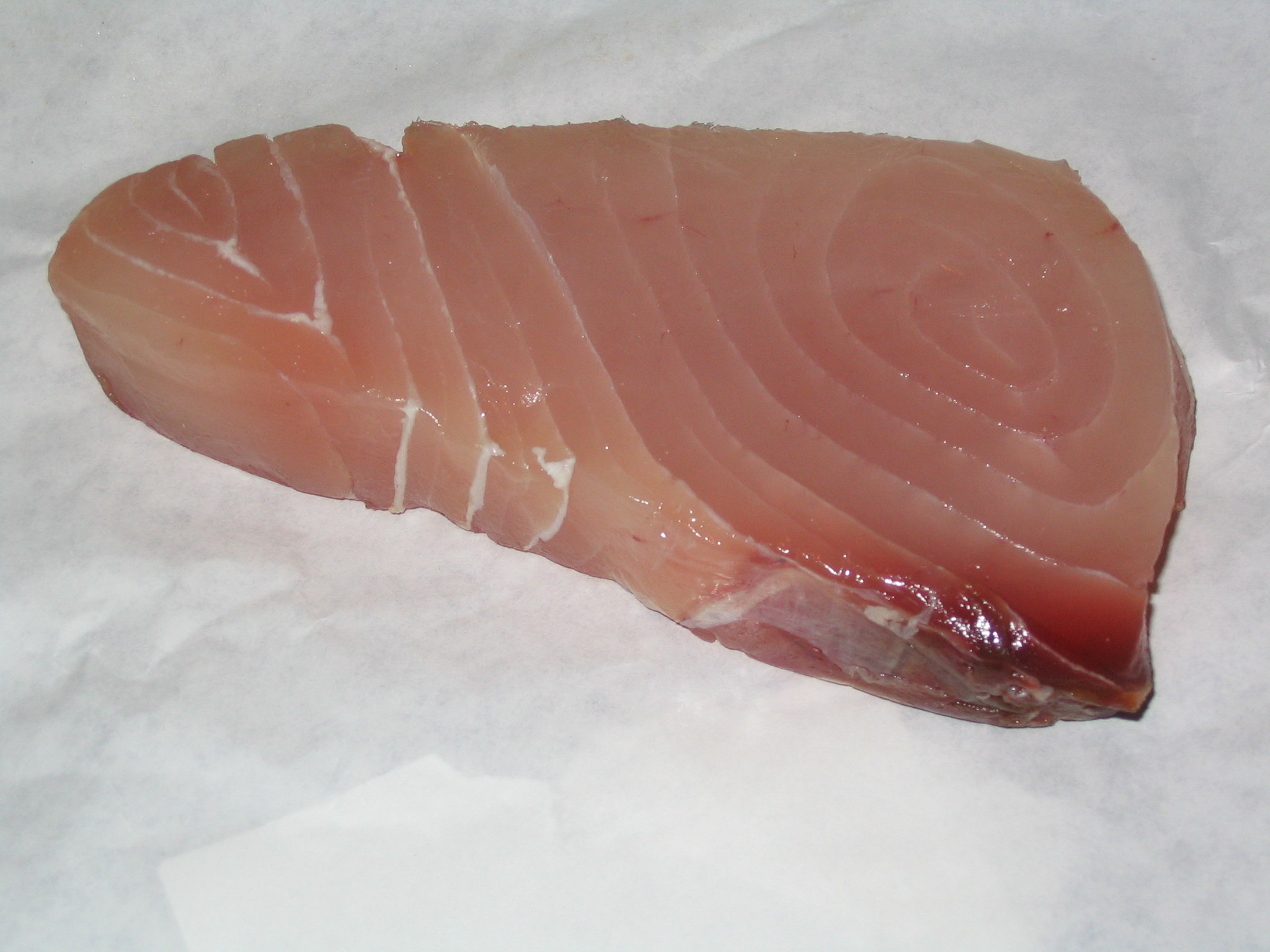
An 8-oz (230-g) marlin steak

=== Commercial fishery ===
Marlin has commercial value throughout the world, with landings totalling 3,064 metric tons in 2000. It is particularly valued in Japan for sashimi. Blue marlin meat is sometimes smoked and sold by roadside vendors.

Blue marlin are often caught as bycatch in tuna longline fisheries.

=== Recreational fishery ===
Sport fishermen first encountered blue marlin in the Bahamas in the 1920s and early 1930s, when pioneering big-game fishermen such as Van Campen Heilner and S. Kip Farrington began exploring the waters offshore of Bimini and Cat Cay. Since then, blue marlin have been renowned as one of the world's greatest game fishes. The sportfishing pursuit of marlin and other billfish has developed into a multimillion dollar industry that includes hundreds of companies and thousands of jobs for boat operators, boat builders, marinas, dealerships, and fishing tackle manufacturers and dealers.

The most established sport fisheries for blue marlin are found along the eastern seaboard and the Gulf Coast of the United States, Bermuda, the Bahamas, and several other Caribbean islands (notably St Thomas and Puerto Rico). Recreational fishing for blue marlin also takes place in Hawaii, Brazil, Venezuela, and the Atlantic coast of Mexico, particularly the Yucatan peninsula. In the eastern Atlantic, blue marlin sport fisheries exist from the Algarve coast of Portugal in the north to Angola in the south and include the islands of the Azores, Canaries, Cape Verde, Madeira, and Ascension Island.

The International Game Fish Association all-tackle world record for blue marlin currently stands at 1,402 lb 2 oz (636 kg). This fish was captured in Vitoria, Brazil.

== Conservation ==
The blue marlin is under intense pressure from longline fishing. In the Caribbean region alone, Japanese and Cuban fishermen annually take over a thousand tons. All vessels within 200 mi (320 km) of the U.S. coastline are required to release any billfish caught. However, the survival rate of released fish is low because of damage during capture.

Makaira nigricans is listed as a threatened species by the International Union for Conservation of Nature. In 2010, Greenpeace International added the blue marlin to its seafood red list. "The Greenpeace International seafood red list is a list of fish that are commonly sold in supermarkets around the world, and which have a very high risk of being sourced from unsustainable fisheries."

Sport fishermen have been at the forefront of efforts to conserve blue marlin populations. The initial efforts to develop electronic tags for tracking highly migratory fish were carried out on marlin in Hawaii, in collaboration with anglers in the Hawaiian International Billfish Tournament.

== In culture ==
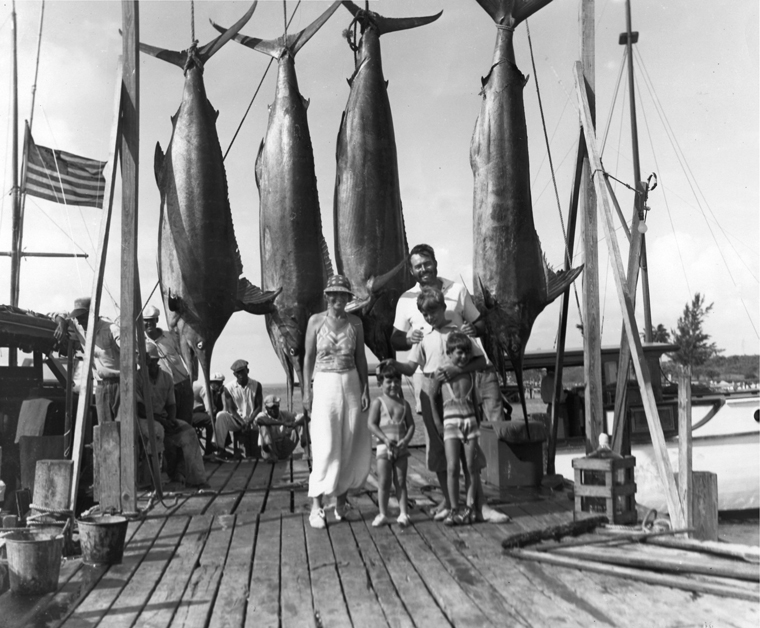
Ernest Hemingway with caught blue marlin

Both Zane Grey and Ernest Hemingway, who fished for blue marlin off the Florida Keys, The Bahamas, and most famously in Cuba, wrote extensively about their pursuit.

The blue marlin is featured prominently on the obverse of the 5 Bermudian dollar note.

In Hemingway's novella The Old Man and the Sea, a fisherman named Santiago battles a blue marlin for three days off the coast of Cuba.

== See also ==
- List of national animals
- Marlin fishing
