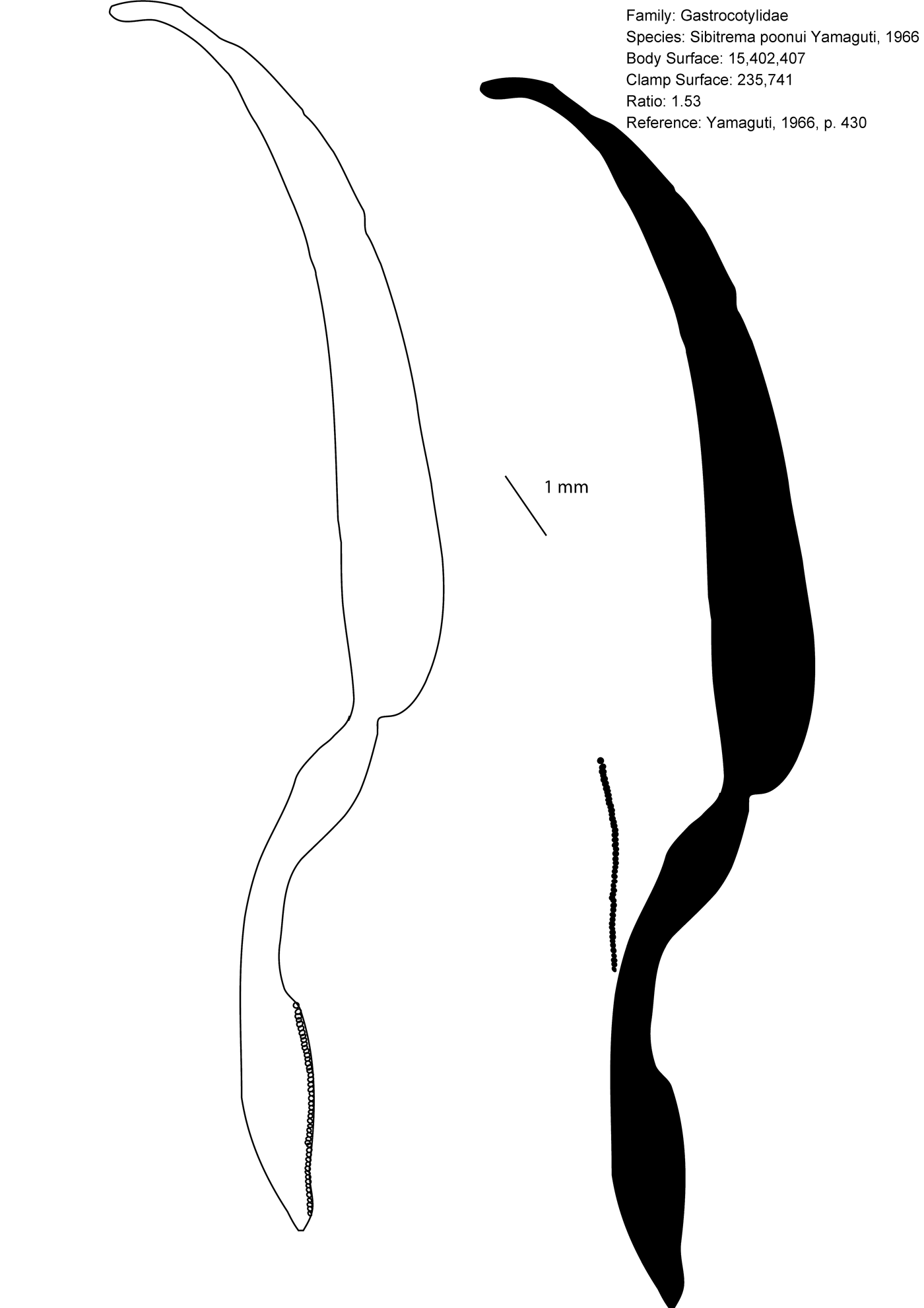
- Silhouette of the body of Sibitrema poonui

Scientific classification
- Kingdom: Animalia
- Phylum: Platyhelminthes
- Class: Monogenea
- Order: Mazocraeidea
- Family: Gastrocotylidae
- Genus: Sibitrema
- Species: S. poonui

Binomial name
- Sibitrema poonui Yamaguti, 1966

= Sibitrema poonui =

Species of worms

Sibitrema poonui is a species of monogenean flatworm, which is parasitic on the gills of a marine fish. It belongs to the family Gastrocotylidae.

== Systematics ==
Sibitrema poonui was described based on a single specimen from the bigeye tuna Parathunnus sibi (currently named Thunnus obesus (Scombridae), and designated as the type species of the genus. Mamaev (1967) established a new genus Metapseudaxine for monogeneans similar to Sibitrema. Metapseudaxine was synonymized with Sibitrema. Sibitrema poonui was described based on 48 specimens from the gills of Cybiosarda elegans and Euthynnus alleteratus off Australia. Australian specimens has a larger body size and differed also in some organ sizes. The differences between the Hawaiian and Australian populations were not significant, especially in view of the identical structure of the genital atrium, the clamps, the hooks and the vaginae.

== Description ==
Sibitrema poonui has a smooth or partly scalloped, extremely body, consi1stmg of three parts: a long wide anterior part gradually tapering anteriorly in its anterior half or third, a narrow neck, and a long opisthaptor. The body comprises an anterior part which contains most organs and a posterior part called the haptor. The haptor is long, gradually tapering posteriorly, on one side with one row of 29–49 clamps. The clamps of the haptor attach the animal to the gill of the fish. A long terminal lappet is present, and is armed with two pairs of hooks. There are also two buccal suckers at the anterior extremity. The digestive organs include an anterior mouth, a pharynx larger than buccal suckers, a long wide oesophagus without diverticula and a posterior intestine that bifurcates in two lateral branches. The intestinal branches are provided with medial and lateral diverticula, joined in posterior part of opisthaptor and extending as a single branch with short diverticula to level of most posterior clamps, or not joined and one branch terminate some distance in front of the other. Each adult contains male and female reproductive organs. The reproductive organs include an anterior genital atrium armed with a single circle of curved terminally bifurcated spines, one row of ventrolateral vaginal openings on each side of the body behind the level of gonopore, each opening surrounded by muscles, a foldedovary and numerous large irregularly shaped testes pre, para and post-ovarian. Eggs are fusiform, with filaments at both ends.

== Hosts and localities ==
The type-host is the bigeye tuna Thunnus obesus (Scombridae). It was also recorded from other Scombridae: Cybiosarda elegans, Euthynnus alleteratus and Thunnus albacares. Sibitrema poonui was first described of fishes caught off Hawaii. It was reported off Australia, Ivory Coast and Senegal, and off Brazil.

== Gallery ==
Hosts of Sibitrema poonui. All of them are Scombridae.

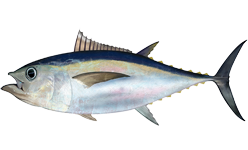
The bigeye tuna Thunnus obesus (Scombridae) is the type host of Sibitrema poonui

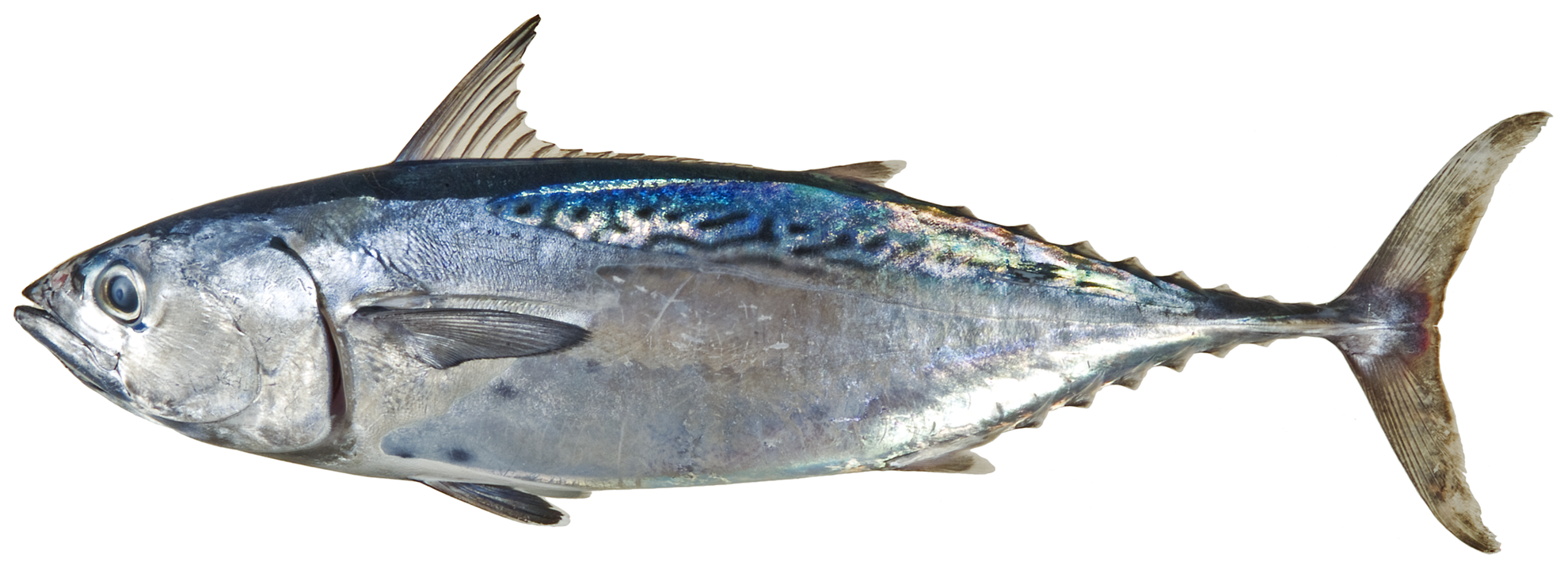
The little tunny Euthynnus alletteratus

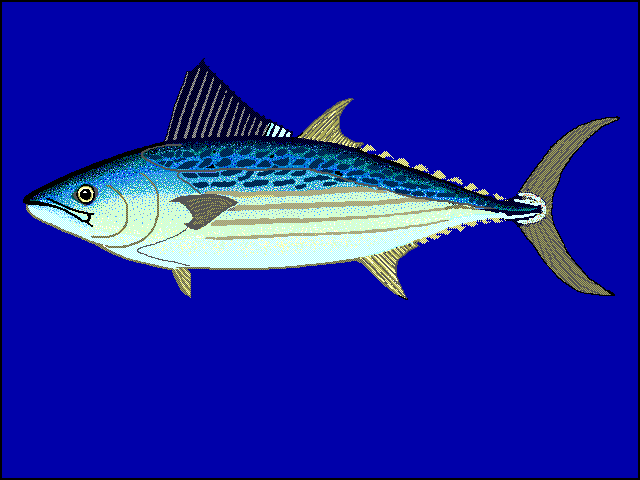
The leaping bonito Cybiosarda elegans

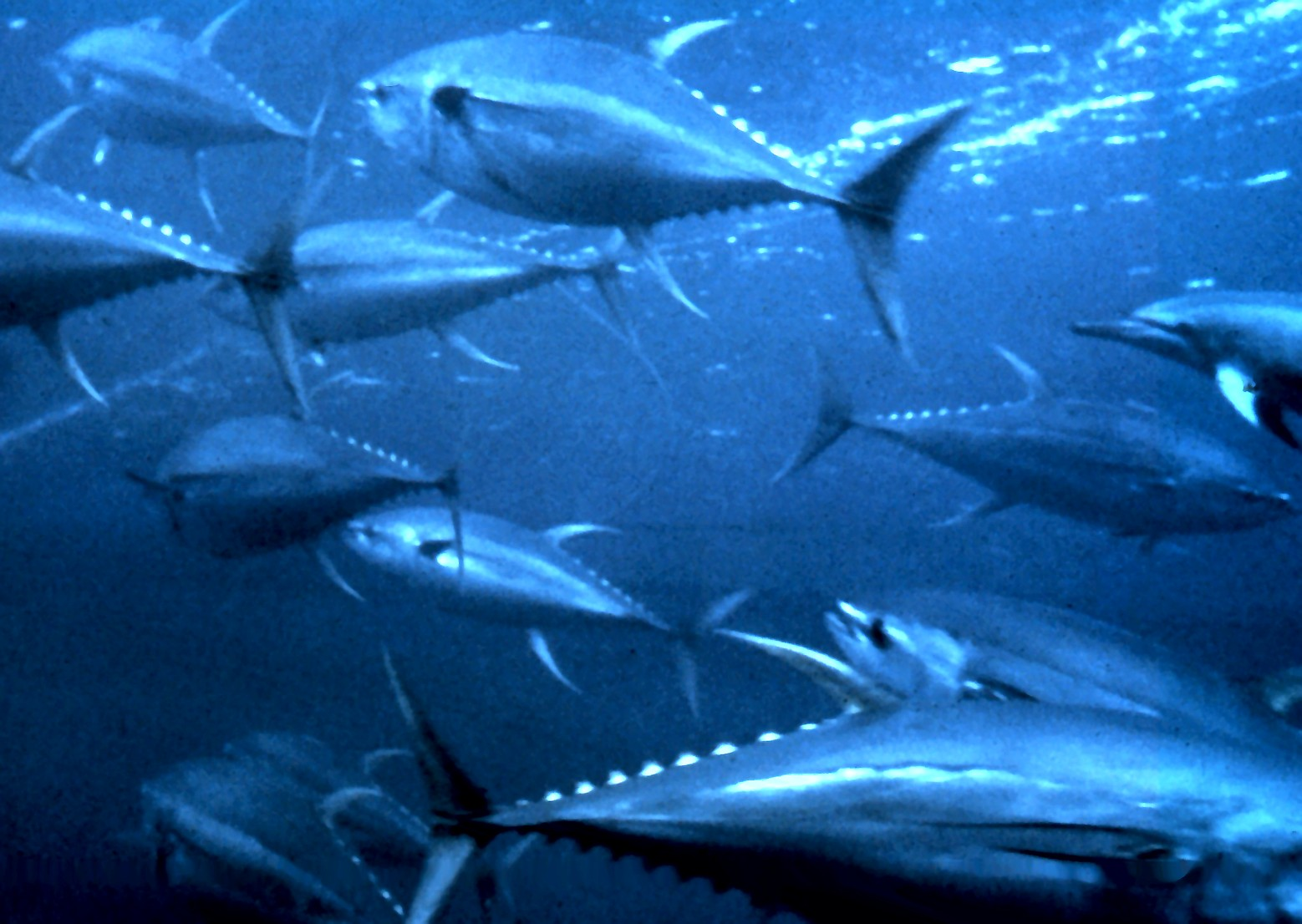
The yellowfin tuna Thunnus albacares
