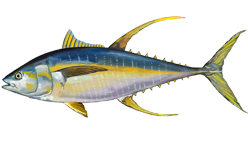

Conservation status
- Least Concern (IUCN 3.1)

Scientific classification
- Kingdom: Animalia
- Phylum: Chordata
- Class: Actinopterygii
- Division: Teleostei
- Order: Scombriformes
- Family: Scombridae
- Genus: Thunnus
- Subgenus: Neothunnus
- Species: T. albacares

Binomial name
- Thunnus albacares Bonnaterre, 1788

Synonyms
- List: Scomber albacares Bonnaterre, 1788; Germo albacares (Bonnaterre, 1788); Neothunnus albacares (Bonnaterre, 1788); Scomber albacorus Lacépède, 1800; Thynnus argentivittatus Cuvier, 1832; Germo argentivittatus (Cuvier, 1832); Neothunnus argentivittatus (Cuvier, 1832); Thunnus argentivittatus (Cuvier, 1832); Scomber sloanei Cuvier, 1832; Thynnus albacora Lowe, 1839; Germo albacora (Lowe, 1839); Neothunnus albacora (Lowe, 1839); Orcynus albacora (Lowe, 1839); Thunnus albacora (Lowe, 1839); Thynnus macropterus Temminck & Schlegel, 1844; Germo macropterus (Temminck & Schlegel, 1844); Neothunnus macropterus (Temminck & Schlegel, 1844); Orcynus macropterus (Temminck & Schlegel, 1844); Thunnus macropterus (Temminck & Schlegel, 1844); Orcynus subulatus Poey, 1875; Thunnus allisoni Mowbray, 1920; Germo allisoni (Mowbray, 1920); Neothunnus allisoni (Mowbray, 1920); Neothunnus itosibi Jordan & Evermann, 1926; Germo itosibi (Jordan & Evermann, 1926); Semathunnus itosibi (Jordan & Evermann, 1926); Thunnus itosibi (Jordan & Evermann, 1926); Neothunnus catalinae Jordan & Evermann, 1926; Thunnus catalinae (Jordan & Evermann, 1926); Kishinoella zacalles Jordan & Evermann, 1926; Thunnus zacalles (Jordan & Evermann, 1926); Semathunnus guildi Fowler, 1933; Neothunnus brevipinna Bellón & Bàrdan de Bellón, 1949

= Yellowfin tuna =

Species of fish

The yellowfin tuna (Thunnus albacares) is a species of tuna found in pelagic waters of tropical and subtropical oceans worldwide.

Yellowfin is often marketed as ahi, from the Hawaiian ʻahi, a name also used there for the closely related bigeye tuna (Thunnus obesus). The species name, albacares ("white meat") can also lead to confusion: in English, the albacore (Thunnus alalunga) is a different species, while yellowfin is officially designated albacore in French and referred to as albacora by Portuguese fishermen.

== Description ==
The yellowfin tuna is among the larger tuna species, reaching weights over 180 kg (400 lb), but is significantly smaller than the Atlantic and Pacific bluefin tunas, which can reach over 450 kg (990 lb), and slightly smaller than the bigeye tuna and the southern bluefin tuna.

The second dorsal fin and the anal fin, as well as the finlets between those fins and the tail, are bright yellow, giving this fish its common name. The second dorsal and anal fins can be very long in mature specimens, reaching almost as far back as the tail and giving the appearance of sickles or scimitars. The pectoral fins are also longer than the related bluefin tuna, but not as long as those of the albacore. The main body is a very dark metallic blue, changing to silver on the belly, which has about 20 vertical lines.

Reported sizes in the literature have ranged as high as 2.4 m (7 ft 10 in) in length and 200 kg (440 lb) in weight. The all-tackle International Game Fish Association (IGFA) record for this species stands at 200.94 kg (443 lb) for a yellowfin caught in 2024 off Cabo San Lucas, Mexico. The previous record of 193.68 kg (427 lb), caught in the same area in 2012, earned its captor a prize of $1 million once the catch was confirmed by the IGFA.

== Habitat ==
Yellowfin tuna are epipelagic fish that inhabit the mixed surface layer of the ocean above the thermocline. Sonic tracking has found that although yellowfin tuna, unlike the related bigeye tuna, mostly range in the top 100 m (330 ft) of the water column, another study reported that depth tends to vary with time of day: 90% of their recorded depth values were shallower than 88 m (289 ft) during the night, and shallower than 190 m (620 ft) during the day.

Although yellowfin tuna penetrate the thermocline relatively infrequently, they are capable of diving to considerable depths. An individual tagged in the Indian Ocean with an archival tag spent 85% of its time in depths shallower than 75 m (246 ft), but was recorded as having made three dives to 578 m (1,896 ft), 982 m (3,222 ft) and 1,160 m (3,810 ft). The maximum dive depth measured in a second study was 1,592 m (5,223 ft).

== Behavior ==
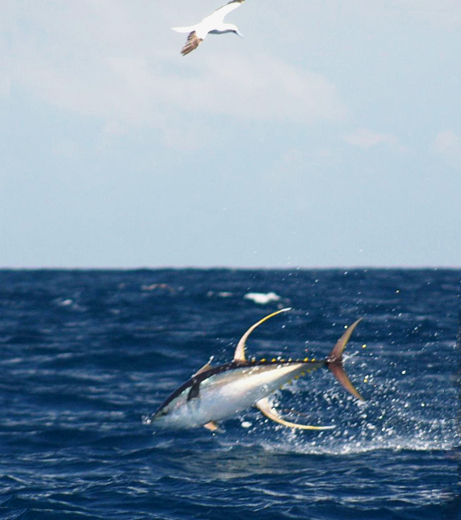
Yellowfin tuna jumping

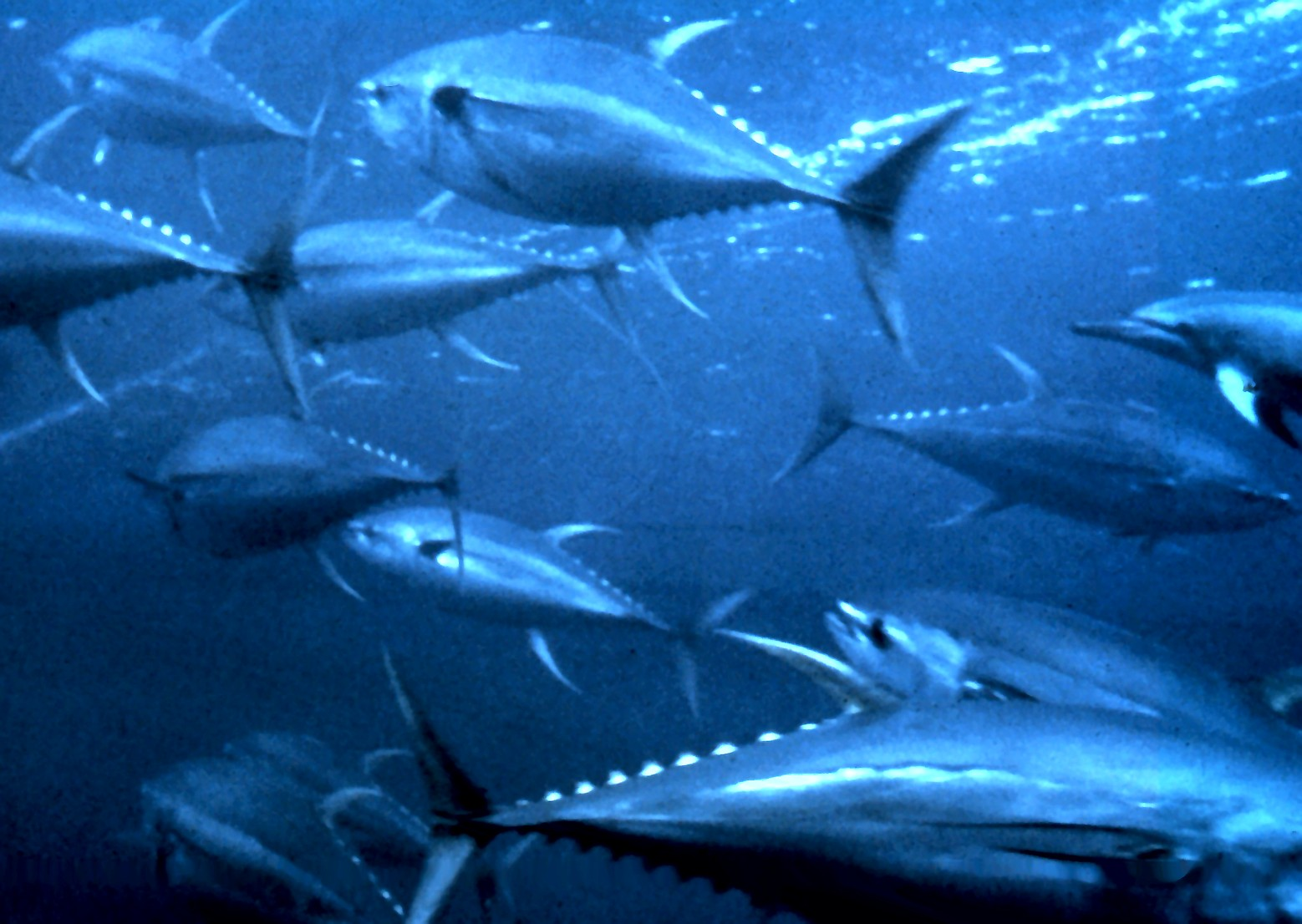
Schooling yellowfin tuna

Although mainly found in deep offshore waters, yellowfin tuna may approach shore when suitable conditions exist. Mid-ocean islands such as the Hawaiian archipelago, other island groups in the Western Pacific, Caribbean and Red Sea Bab-el-Mandeb in the Indian Ocean, Indonesia, Maldives, as well as the volcanic islands of the Atlantic such as Ascension Island and Saint Helena, often harbor yellowfin feeding on the baitfish these spots concentrate close to the shoreline. Yellowfin may venture well inshore of the continental shelf when water temperature and clarity are suitable and food is abundant.

Yellowfin tuna often travel in schools with similarly sized companions. They sometimes school with other tuna species and mixed schools of small yellowfin and skipjack tuna, in particular, are commonplace. They are often associated with various species of dolphins or porpoises, as well as with larger marine creatures such as whales and whale sharks. They also associate with drifting flotsam such as logs and pallets, and sonic tagging indicates some follow moving vessels. Hawaiian yellowfins associate with anchored fish aggregation devices and with certain sections of the 50-fathom curve.

== Diet and predation ==
Yellowfin tuna at an aquarium in Japan

Yellowfin tuna prey include other fish, pelagic crustaceans and squid. Like all tunas, their body shape is particularly adapted for speed, enabling them to pursue and capture fast-moving baitfish such as flying fish, sauries and mackerel. Schooling species such as myctophids or lanternfish and similar pelagic driftfish, anchovies and sardines are frequently taken. Large yellowfins prey on smaller members of the tuna family such as frigate mackerel and skipjack tuna.

In turn, yellowfin are preyed upon when young by other pelagic hunters, including larger tuna, seabirds and predatory fishes such as wahoo, shark and billfish. Adults are threatened only by the largest and fastest hunters, such as toothed whales, particularly the false killer whale, pelagic sharks such as the mako and great white, large Atlantic blue marlin and Pacific blue marlin, and black marlin. The main source of mortality, however, is industrial tuna fisheries.

Yellowfins are able to escape most predators because of their speed, swimming at up to 20.8 m/s (47 mph). Unlike most fish, tuna are warm-blooded. Their unique cardiovascular system, warm body temperature, elevated metabolism and well-developed lymphatic system are all involved in their ability to engage in both rapid bursts and long periods of swimming. When swimming rapidly, a tuna's fins retract into grooves to form a smooth hydrodynamic surface and increase its speed, due to a biological hydraulic system involving the lymphatic system.

The behavior of abruptly diving to deeper levels may be a tactic to escape predators. Evidence from trackers even includes a case in which a diving yellowfin tuna may have been swallowed at a depth of 326 m (1,070 ft).

== Commercial fishery ==
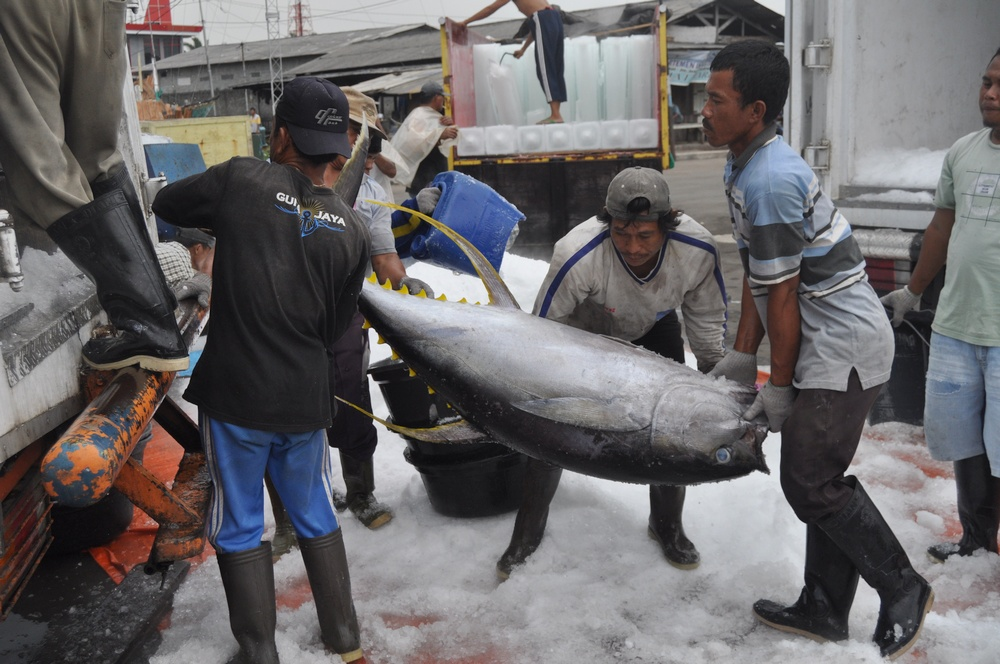
Yellowfin tuna loaded onto a truck for transportation in Palabuhanratu, West Java

Global capture production of Yellowfin tuna (Thunnus albacares) in million tonnes from 1950 to 2022, as reported by the FAO

Modern commercial fisheries catch yellowfin tuna with encircling nets (purse seines), and by industrial longlines. In 2010, 558,761 metric tons of yellowfin tuna were caught in the western and central Pacific Ocean.

=== Pole and line ===
Formerly, much of the commercial catch was made by pole-and-line fishing, using live bait such as anchovy to attract schools of tuna close to the fishing vessel that were then taken with baited jigs on sturdy bamboo or fiberglass poles or on handlines. This fishery, which targeted skipjack and occasionally albacore, as well as yellowfin, for canning, reached its heyday between World War I and the 1950s before declining. The most well-known fleet of pole-and-line boats sailed from San Diego in California and exploited abundant stocks in Mexican waters, as well as further south to Panama, Costa Rica and the Galapagos Islands.

Pole-and-line fishing is still carried out today in the Maldives, Ghana, the Canary Islands, Madeira and the Azores. Few pole-and-line boats now specifically target yellowfin, an incidental take compared to the total commercial catch. In the Maldives, the catch is a mix of skipjack tuna and small yellowfins that often associate with them.

=== Purse seining ===
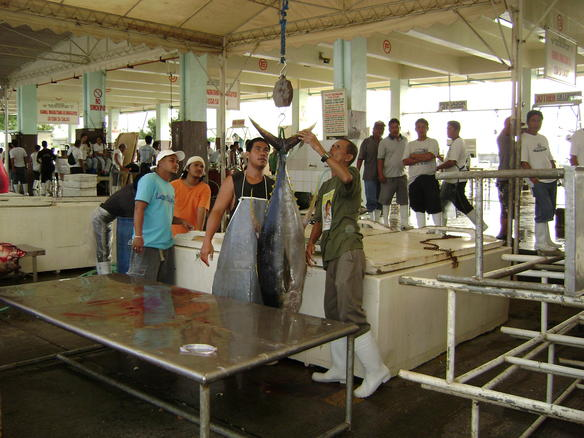
A yellowfin being weighed at the General Santos Fish Port Complex in General Santos, the center of the tuna industry in the Philippines which is the world's fourth-largest producer of canned and fresh-chilled tuna products

Purse seining largely took over commercial tuna fisheries in the 1960s and 1970s. Today, purse seines account for more of the commercial catch than any other method. The purse-seine fishery primarily operates in the Pacific Ocean, in the historic tuna grounds of the San Diego tuna fleet in the eastern Pacific, and in the islands of the western Pacific, where many U.S. tuna canneries relocated in the 1980s, but significant purse-seine catches are also made in the Indian Ocean and in the tropical Atlantic Ocean, especially in the Gulf of Guinea by French and Spanish vessels.

Purse-seine vessels locate tuna using onboard lookouts, as was done in the pole-and-line fishery, but they also employ sophisticated onboard electronics, sea-surface temperature and other satellite data, and helicopters overhead. Once a school is located, the net is set around it. A single set may yield 100 t (98 long tons; 110 short tons). Modern tuna seiners have a capacity up to 2,000 metric tons (2,000 long tons; 2,200 short tons), reach speeds of over 17 knots (31 km/h; 20 mph), and carry multiple spotting helicopters.

Purse seining for yellowfin tuna became highly controversial in the late 1970s when it became apparent that the eastern Pacific fishery was killing many spinner dolphins, pantropical spotted dolphins and other cetaceans (often called "porpoises" by the tuna fleet) that accompany the fish. This association has been long-recognized by commercial tuna fishermen.

==== Dolphin-friendly labeling ====
Since the introduction of "dolphin-friendly" labeling, an increasing number of purse seine sets are now made on "free schools" unassociated with dolphins, as well as schools that associate with floating objects—another long-understood association that has grown in importance in tuna fisheries. The latter practice in particular has a major ecological impact because of the high proportion of bycatch, including manta rays, sea turtles, pelagic sharks, billfish and other threatened marine species taken by setting nets around logs and other floating objects. Such tuna are often significantly smaller than the larger adult tuna associated with dolphins. The removal of huge numbers of juvenile yellowfin and bigeye tuna that have yet to reach breeding age has major potential consequences for tuna stocks worldwide.

=== Longline ===
Most of the commercial catch is canned, but the sashimi marketplace adds significant demand for high-quality fish. This market is primarily supplied by industrial tuna longline vessels.

Industrial longlining was primarily perfected by Japanese fishermen who expanded into new grounds in the Western Pacific, Indian and Atlantic Oceans in the late 1950s and early 1960s. Longlining has since been adopted by other fishermen, most notably South Korea, Taiwan and the United States.

Tuna longlining targets larger sashimi-grade fish around 25 kg (55 lb) and up that swim deeper in the water column. In tropical and warm temperate areas, the more valuable bigeyes are often the main target, but significant effort is also directed towards larger yellowfins. Longlining seeks areas of higher ocean productivity indicated by temperature and chlorophyll fronts formed by upwellings, ocean current eddies and major bathymetric features. Satellite imaging technology is the primary tool for locating these dynamic and constantly changing ocean areas.

Bycatch is a major environmental issue in the longline fishery, especially impacting billfish, sea turtles, pelagic sharks and seabirds.

=== Artisanal fisheries ===
Besides the large-scale industrial purse seine and longline fisheries, yellowfin tuna also support smaller-scale artisanal fisheries that have often supplied local domestic markets for generations. Artisanal fisheries now also often fish for the lucrative sashimi market in many locations where international air shipment is possible.

Artisanal fishermen tend to employ assorted hook-and-line gear such as trolling lines, surface and deep handlines and longlines.

By far, the largest fishery using artisanal methods exists in Philippine and Indonesian waters where thousands of fishermen target yellowfin tuna around fish aggregation devices or payaos, although this fishery far exceeds the artisanal scale in terms of tonnage caught and the numbers of participants involved, and should more properly be considered a commercial handline fishery. General Santos is the most important Philippine port for the landing and transhipment of catches. Catches that qualify as sashimi grade are mostly shipped to the Japanese market; those that do not meet the grade are sold locally or canned. Elsewhere in the Pacific, small-boat fishers in Hawaii, Tahiti and other Pacific islands supply local and in some cases foreign markets with fresh yellowfins.

Handline-caught yellowfin tuna is one of the few exports of the economy of St. Helena.

== Sport fishing ==
Yellowfin tuna probably first came to the attention of sport fishermen when they appeared on the tuna grounds of Catalina Island, California, only a few years after pioneering fishermen invented the sport, targeting the Pacific bluefin tuna. These tuna were of the same species caught by commercial fishermen in Japan and the western Pacific, but the reason for their appearance was not known at the time. Later, warmer water species such as yellowfin tuna, dorado and striped marlin were found to enter southern California waters in seasons having favorable ocean conditions, particularly during the El Niño phenomenon, which brings warmer water up North America's western coast.

Yellowfin tuna were subsequently discovered by sport fishermen in Bermuda, the Bahamas, Hawaii and many other parts of their range. Larger adult fish which had developed distinctively long sickle fins were initially thought to be a different species and were known as Allison tuna (a name first given by the then curator of the Bermuda Aquarium, Louis Mowbray, in 1920). Such destinations as Hawaii and Bermuda became famed for their catches of these beautiful fish. In Hawaii, various styles of feather lures served as bait, but in Bermuda, chumming techniques from boats anchored on productive banks were evolved to target not only Allison tuna, but also wahoo and the smaller blackfin tuna. Bermudian experts developed techniques to take all these fish on light tackle, and for many years the International Game Fish Association records for yellowfin tuna were dominated by entries from Bermuda in the lighter line classes, with fish in the 200-pound (91 kg) and larger class from Hawaii taking most of the heavier line-class records.

Today, yellowfin tuna are a major sport fish pursued by sport fishermen in many parts of the world. Thousands of anglers fish for yellowfin tuna along the eastern seaboard of the United States, particularly in North Carolina and New England. Yellowfin are also a popular gamefish among anglers fishing from U.S. Gulf Coast ports, San Diego and other ports of southern California. Larger "long-range" boats in the San Diego fleet also fish in Mexican waters, searching for yellowfin tuna in many of the grounds that the San Diego pole-and-line tuna clippers used to fish. The yellowfin tuna is also a highly prized catch in the offshore sport fisheries of South Africa, Australia and New Zealand. Sport fishing for yellowfin tuna exists on a smaller scale in many other parts of the world.

=== Gulf of Mexico ===
Recreational fishing for yellowfin tuna in the Gulf of Mexico is a significant contributor to the region's economy, with an estimated economic impact of $7 billion annually. This type of fishing has led to the development of a thriving tourism industry, with many fishing charters and resorts offering guided trips and equipment rental services to visitors.

Due to their large size and popular use in cuisine, yellowfin tuna are a popular target for recreational anglers. Many fishing enthusiasts visit the Gulf of Mexico for an opportunity at catching a large yellowfin tuna, creating a significant source of revenue for local businesses and communities. For sustainability purposes, many fishing organisations have implemented catch limits and other measures.

=== Clubs ===
During the early 1900s many yellowfin tuna fishing clubs were formed around the world. In 1917, the Yokohama Fishing Club was founded, becoming the first fishing club in Japan to cater to foreigners. The Tuna Club of Avalon, which was founded in 1898 in Avalon, California played an instrumental role in the development of the sport in North America. While in Europe The Club Nautico de San Remo in Italy and the Club Nautique de Cannes in France are two of the earliest known clubs to organize yellowfin tuna fishing tournaments in these countries, with the first tournaments held in the late 1960s.

== Cuisine ==
According to the Hawaii Seafood Buyers Guide, yellowfin tuna is widely used in raw fish dishes, especially sashimi. This fish is also served grilled, or seared rare.

Yellowfin buyers recognize two grades, "sashimi grade" and "other", although variation in the quality of "other" grades occurs.

Different seafood sustainability guides come to different conclusions about whether yellowfin fishing is sustainable. The Audubon's Seafood Guide (a guide for what types of marine food products are not ecofriendly) lists troll-caught tuna as "OK", but labels long-line caught as "Be Careful".

Yellowfin is becoming a popular replacement for the severely depleted supplies of southern bluefin tuna.

In 2010, Greenpeace International added the yellowfin tuna to its seafood red list. The Greenpeace International seafood red list is a "list of fish that are commonly sold in supermarkets around the world, and which have a very high risk of being sourced from unsustainable fisheries".

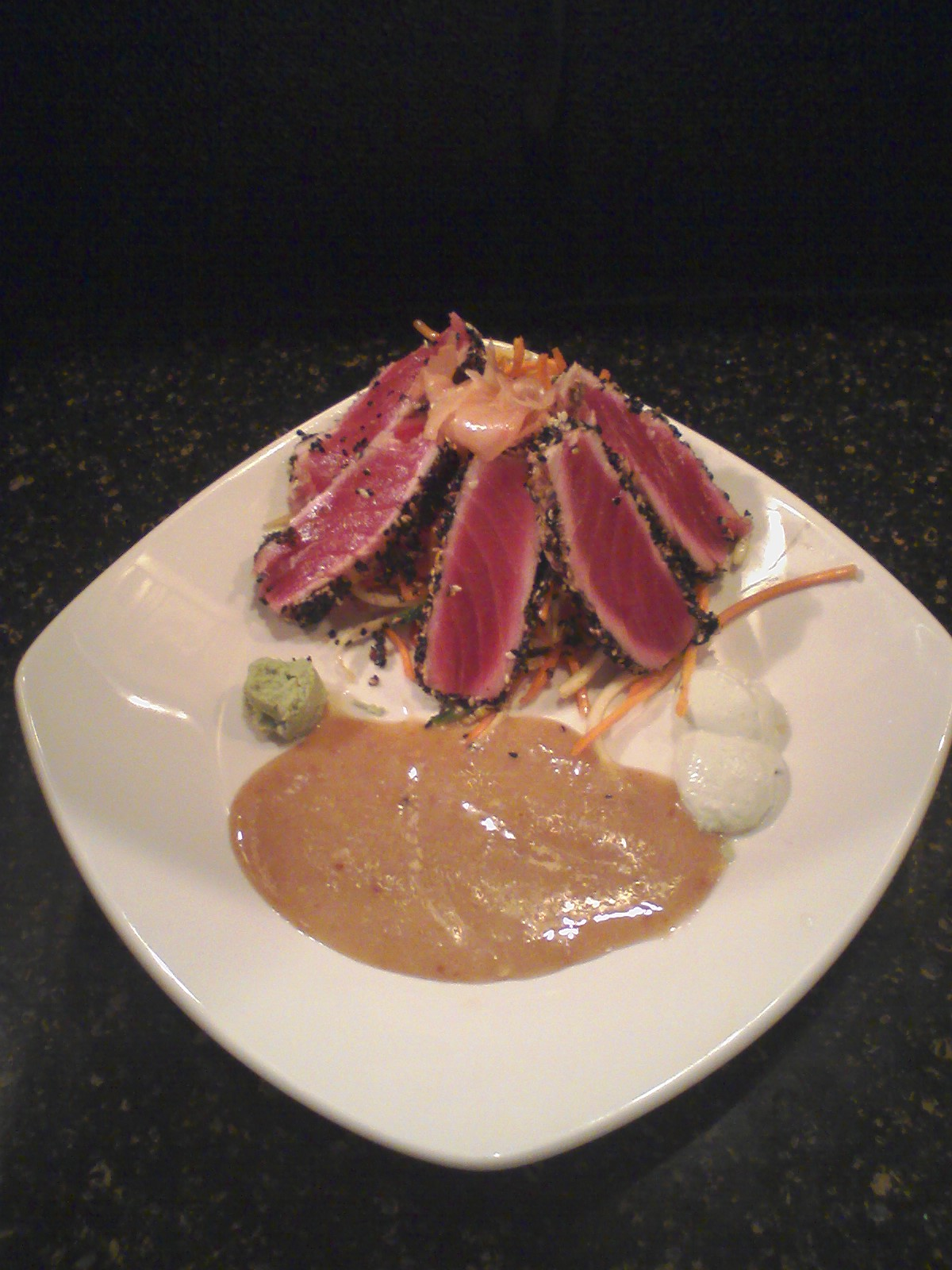
Pan-seared yellowfin

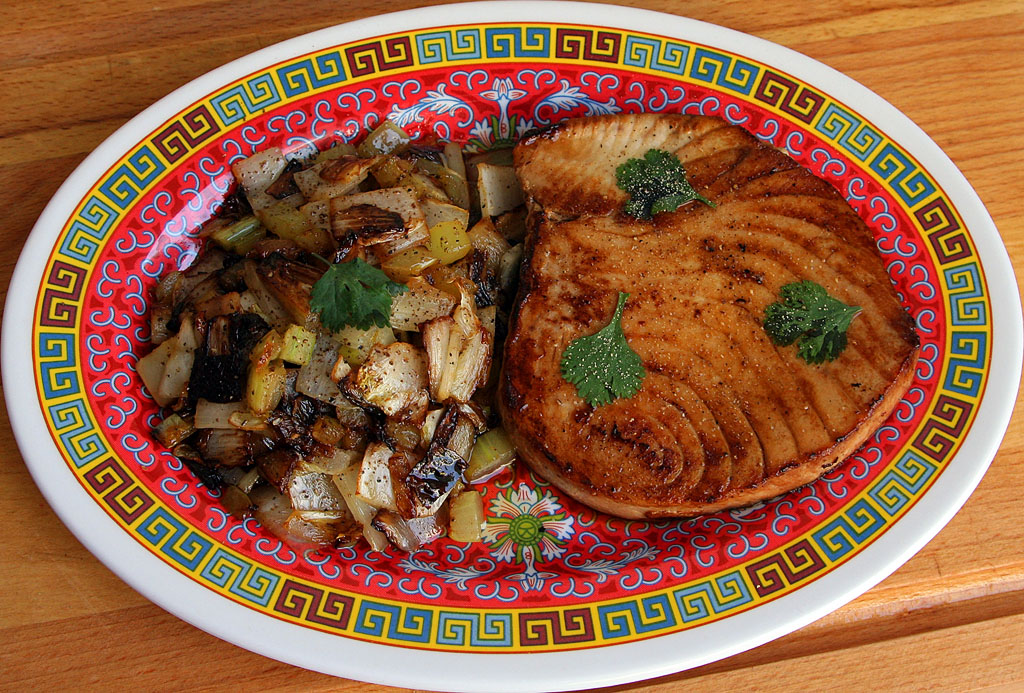
Sautéed yellowfin steak
