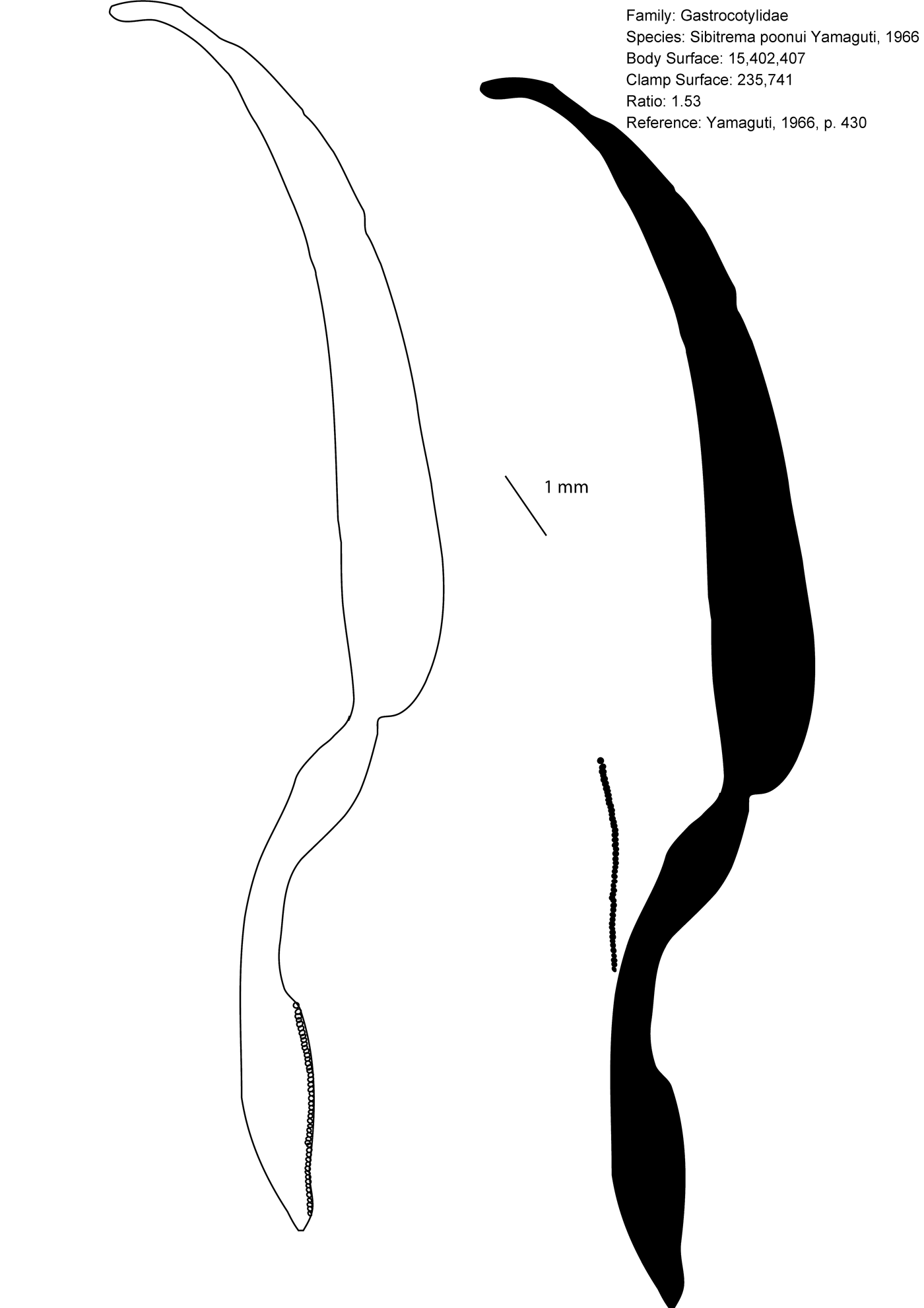
- Silhouette of the body of Sibitrema poonui

Scientific classification
- Kingdom: Animalia
- Phylum: Platyhelminthes
- Class: Monogenea
- Order: Mazocraeidea
- Family: Gastrocotylidae
- Genus: Sibitrema; Yamaguti, 1966

= Sibitrema =

Genus of flatworms

Sibitrema is a genus which belongs to the phylum Platyhelminthes and class Monogenea; the only species included in this genus is parasite of fish.

== Systematics ==
Sibitrema was established to accommodate Sibitrema poonui from the gills of the bigeye tuna Thunnus obesus , designated as the type species of the genus. Mamaev (1967) established a new genus Metapseudaxine for monogeneans similar to Sibitrema. Metapseudaxine was synonymized with Sibitrema.

This genus resembles Pseudaxinoides in having a single row of clamps on one side of the body and one row of lateral vaginal openings on each side of body . However, it differs from it in having testes preovarial, ovarial and postovarial. Sibitrema can be distinguished by other monogeneans by the following features:

- A narrow "neck" between anterior mam part of body and opisthaptor.
- Testes preovarial, ovarial and postovarial.
- One row of lateral vaginal openings on each side of body.

== Morphology ==
Individuals of species of Sibitrema, like any typical polyopisthocotylean monogenean, have an anterior organ called prohaptor, which is mainly used for feeding and attachment. Although the prohaptor is not the primary attachment organ, it is used to anchor the body of the parasite while the opisthaptor is being repositioned. The opisthaptor is an important attachment organ that allows these ectoparasites to latch onto their hosts.

The body is partly scalloped, extremely long, and consist of three parts: a long wide anterior part gradually tapering anteriorly in its anterior half or third, a narrow neck, and a long haptor. Located at the anterior part of the worm is the funnel-shaped mouth that is connected to the pharynx which is larger than the buccal suckers, followed by the long wide oesophagus esophagus that is smaller in diameter compared to the pharynx. The esophagus then divides into intestinal crura, which extends further posteriorly. The cruca is divided into pouches, which extend between vitellaria. Vitallaria are glands that secrete yolk around the egg. This digestive pathway is observed to be continuous throughout the entire worm.

The worms are hermaphroditic, containing both male and female organs. Each worm has reproductive organs such as vas deferens, testis, uterus, vitelline duct, ovary, and vitellaria. They also have flame cells that function as a kidney and remove waste material. A short duct that opens to the outside on the dorsal surface is composed of four canals on each side, two posterior and two anterior, that come together laterally to the cirrus. During observation on immature specimens, these canals can still be seen. However, on adults, these canals are concealed by vitellaria.

== Species ==
Sibitrema includes one species:

- Sibitrema poonui Yamaguti, 1966
