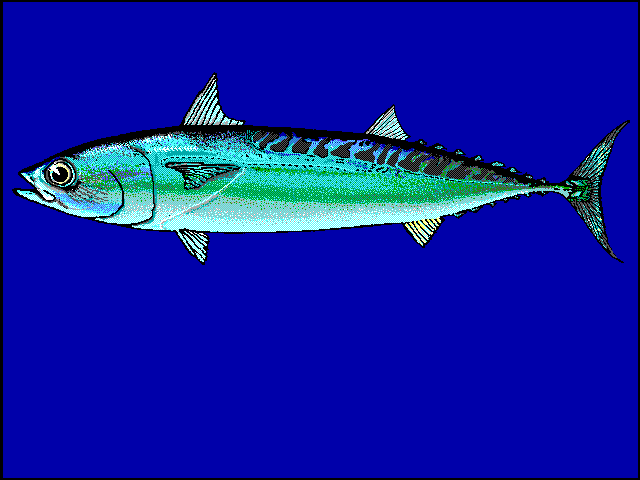
- Bullet tuna, Auxis rochei

Scientific classification
- Kingdom: Animalia
- Phylum: Chordata
- Class: Actinopterygii
- Order: Scombriformes
- Family: Scombridae
- Tribe: Thunnini
- Genus: Auxis; Cuvier, 1829

Type species
- Scomber rochei Risso, 1810

Species
- See text.

= Auxis =

Frigate and bullet tunas Temporal range: Middle Miocene - Recent

Genus of fishes

Auxis is a genus of ocean-dwelling ray-finned bony fish in the family Scombridae, and tribe Thunnini, also known as the tunas. Auxis, commonly and collectively called the frigate tunas, is one of five genera of tunas which comprise the Thunnini tribe.

== Species ==
There are four extant species in the genus Auxis, which were formerly regarded as two polytypic species, each with two subspecies. In 2021, the extinct species Auxis koreanus was described from the Neogene of South Korea.

=== Extant species ===
- Auxis brachydorax Collette & Aadland, 1996
- Auxis eudorax Collette & Aadland, 1996
- Auxis rochei Risso, 1810 (bullet tuna)
- Auxis thazard Lacépède, 1800 (frigate tuna)

=== Extinct species ===
- †Auxis koreanus Nam et al., 2021

== Description ==
Auxis can reach a length of 50–65 centimetres (20–26 in). They have a strong, fusiform body with a sharpened head. The teeth are small and conical. The two dorsal fins are separated by a wide gap. The pectoral fins are short. They have a dark, blue-black back, the top of the head may be deep purple or almost black. The belly is whitish and without streaks or spots.

== Distribution ==
These fishes are widespread in all tropical and subtropical seas and oceans, and both mentioned species are present in the Mediterranean Sea with their subspecies (A. thazard thazard and A. rochei rochei).

== Ecology ==
Auxis species are the predominant prey of pelagic gamefish off of the east coast of the United States.

== As food ==
In Japan the two species in the genus are collectively called sōdagatsuo (Japanese: ソウダガツオ,宗太鰹), and this is also the common genus name. In Japanese cuisine, these fish are processed into sōdabushi, a product much like katsuobushi, though not really used in fine-dining restaurants or as condiment, but as a fish stock ingredient at more budget type popular-dining places, e.g., soba noodle shops.

Although fresh fish might be eaten as sashimi or grilled, it has a lot of dark-red meat (chiai), so it is valued much less than the similar katsuo (skipjack tuna). And it degrades quickly so shipment out to market is limited. The frigate tuna (hirasoda) is considered superior between the two.

== Fossil record ==
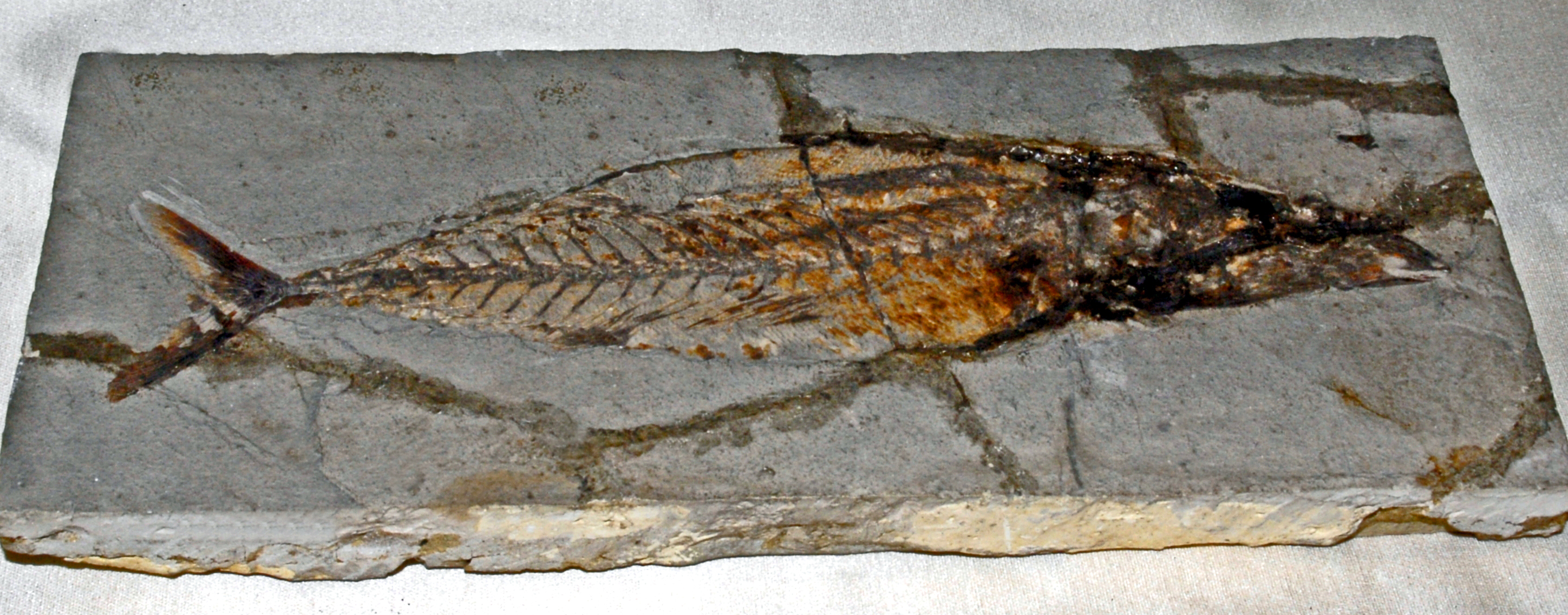
Fossil of Auxis propterigius from Monte Bolca

Fossils of Auxis have been found in the Miocene of South Korea and the Pliocene of Italy and United States (age range: from 15 to 3.6 million years ago.).
