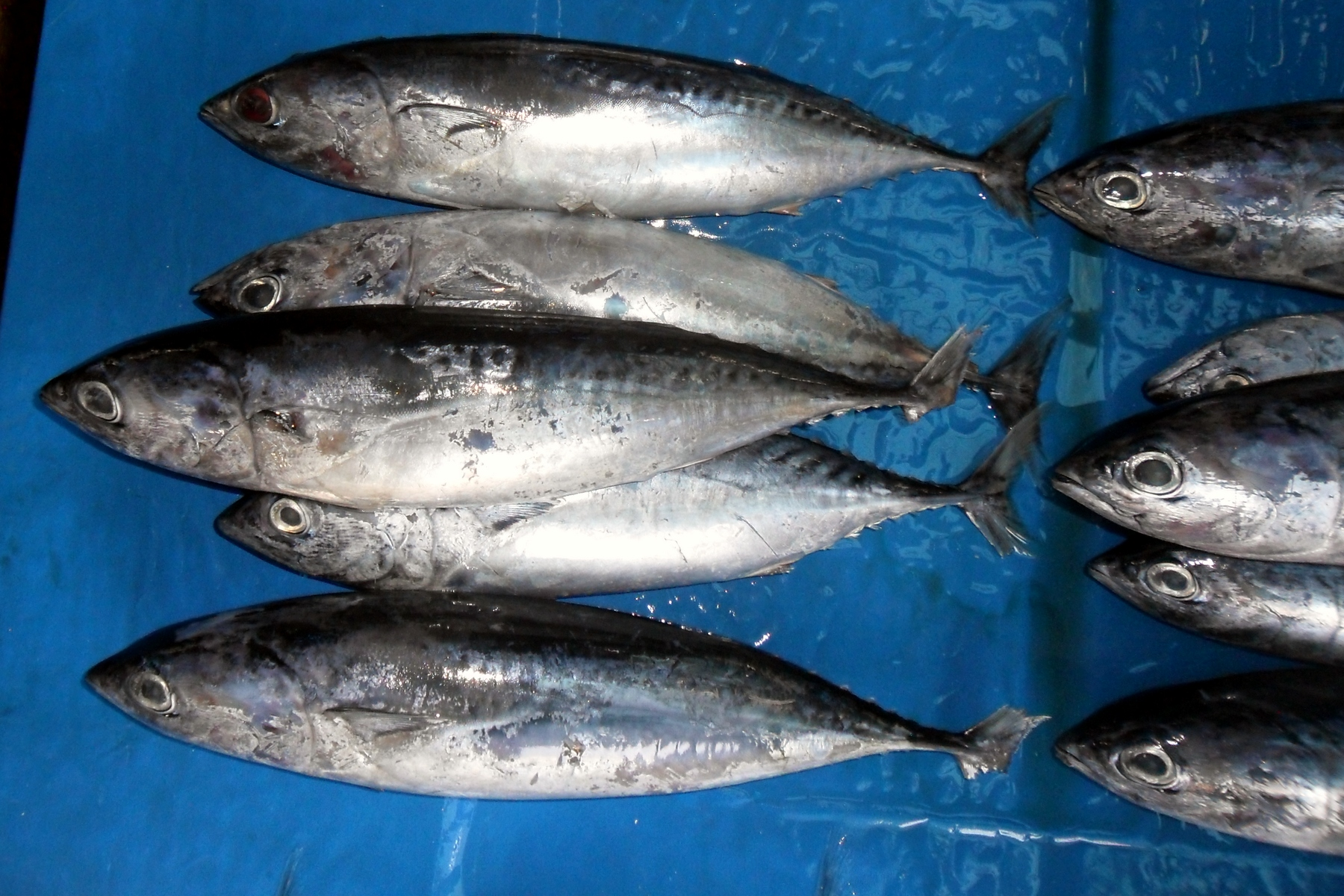

Conservation status
- Least Concern (IUCN 3.1)

Scientific classification
- Kingdom: Animalia
- Phylum: Chordata
- Class: Actinopterygii
- Order: Scombriformes
- Family: Scombridae
- Genus: Auxis
- Species: A. rochei

Binomial name
- Auxis rochei (Risso, 1810)

Synonyms
- Scomber rochei Risso, 1810; Scomber bisus Rafinesque, 1810; Auxis bisus (Rafinesque, 1810); Thynnus rocheanus Risso, 1827; Thunnus rocheanus (Risso, 1827); Auxis vulgaris Cuvier, 1832; Auxis thynnoides Bleeker, 1855; Auxis ramsayi Castelnau, 1879; Auxis maru Kishinouye, 1915

= Bullet tuna =

Species of ray-finned fish

The bullet tuna (Auxis rochei) is a species of tuna, in the family Scombridae, found circumglobally in tropical oceans, including the Mediterranean Sea, in open surface waters to depths of 50 m (164 ft). The population of bullet tuna in the Eastern Pacific was classified as a subspecies of A. rochei, A. rochei eudorax, but some authorities regard this as a valid species Auxis eudorax. Its maximum length is 50 centimetres (20 in).

Sometimes called bullet mackerel, the bullet tuna is a comparatively small and slender tuna. It has a triangular first dorsal fin, widely separated from the second dorsal fin, which, like the anal and pectoral fins, is relatively small. There are the usual finlets of the tuna. There is a small corselet of small scales around the pectoral region of the body.

Bullet tunas are blue-black on the back with a pattern of zig-zag dark markings on the upper hind body, and silver below. The fins are dark grey.

They feed on small fish, squid, planktonic crustaceans, and stomatopod larvae.
