= Auxis brachydorax =

Scientific classification
- Kingdom: Animalia
- Phylum: Chordata
- Class: Actinopterygii
- Order: Scombriformes
- Family: Scombridae
- Genus: Auxis
- Species: A. brachydorax

Binomial name
- Auxis brachydorax Collette & Aadland, 1996

Synonyms
- Auxis thazard brachydorax

Species of tuna

Auxis brachydorax is a species of tuna in the family Scombridae. It is a pelagic marine species native to the eastern Central Pacific, where it has been reported from mainland Ecuador, the Galápagos, Mexico, Panama, Peru, and the United States. The species reaches 40 cm (15.7 inches) in fork length.
