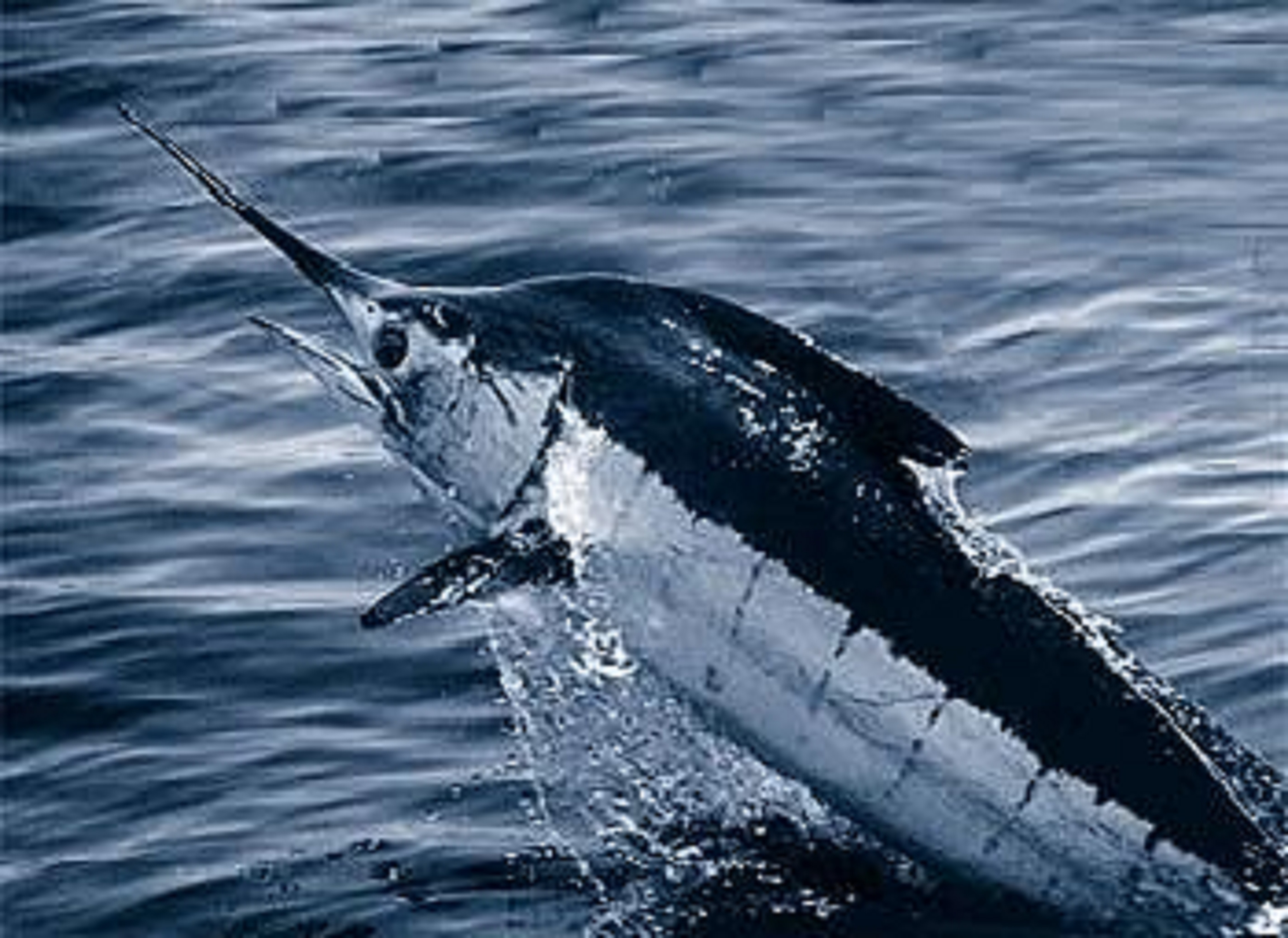
- Atlantic blue marlin, Makaira nigricans

Conservation status
- Vulnerable (IUCN 3.1) (Note that the IUCN recognises the blue marlin as a single species)

Scientific classification
- Kingdom: Animalia
- Phylum: Chordata
- Class: Actinopterygii
- Division: Teleostei
- Order: Carangiformes
- Family: Istiophoridae
- Genus: Makaira; Lacépède, 1802

Type species
- Makaira nigricans Lacépède, 1802

Species
- Makaira mazara Makaira nigricans

Synonyms
- Eumakaira Hirasaka & H. Nakamura, 1947; Marlina Hirasaka & H. Nakamura, 1947; Orthocraeros J. L. B. Smith, 1956

= Makaira =

Makaira Temporal range: Middle Miocene to present

Genus of ray-finned fishes

Makaira (Latin via Greek: μαχαίρα "sword") is a genus of marlin in the family Istiophoridae. It includes the Atlantic blue and Indo-Pacific blue marlins. In the past, the black marlin was also included in this genus, but today it is placed in its own genus, Istiompax.

== Species ==
- Makaira nigricans Lacepède, 1802 (Atlantic blue marlin)
- Makaira mazara (Jordan & Snyder, 1901) (Indo-Pacific blue marlin)

Although they are traditionally listed as separate species, recent research indicates that the Atlantic blue marlin (Makaira nigricans) and Indo-Pacific blue marlin (Makaira mazara) may be parapatric populations of the same species.

The following fossil species are also known:

- †Makaira adensa Gracia et al, 2024 - late Miocene of Italy
- †Makaira belgica (Lériche, 1926) - middle Miocene of Belgium, late Miocene of Italy
- †Makaira colonense Gracia et al, 2022 - late Miocene of Panama
- †Makaira cyclovata Gracia et al, 2024 - late Miocene of Italy
- †Makaira fierstini Gracia et al, 2022 - late Miocene of Panama
- †Makaira panamense Fierstine, 1978 - late Miocene of Panama
- †Makaira purdyi Fierstine, 1999 - Pliocene of North Carolina, USA
- †Makaira teretirostris (Rütimeyer, 1857) - early Pliocene of France

Phylogenetic analyses recover these fossil Makaira as together forming a clade more derived than the extant species, despite all of them being extinct.
