= S. Kip Farrington =

American journalist

S. Kip Farrington, Jr.
- Anglers S. Kip Farrington (left) and Mike Lerner (right) inspect US Navy survival gear in Miami
- Born: Selwyn Kip Farrington, Jr. May 7, 1904; Orange, New Jersey, U.S.
- Died: February 7, 1983 (aged 78); Southampton, New York, U.S.
- Occupation: Writer
- Spouse: Sara Houston Chisholm (1934–83)

Selwyn Kip Farrington Jr. (May 7, 1904 – February 7, 1983) was an American writer and sport fisherman. As a journalist he did much to popularize big game fishing from the 1930s onward, and set a number of records himself. In addition to fishing, he was a noted rail enthusiast. Farrington wrote and published twenty-four books covering such diverse topics as fishing, railroading, and amateur hockey.

== Biography ==
Farrington was born in Orange, New Jersey. His father was a stockbroker; Farrington joined the family firm at the age of 16 and seemed destined to follow in his father's footsteps until a move out to East Hampton on Long Island in the 1920s awakened an interest in big-game fishing.

Farrington became a recognized figure in the sportfishing community. He served as fishing editor of Field & Stream from 1937 to 1972 and counted the American writer Ernest Hemingway, another avid fisherman, among his friends. His largest catch came in 1952, when he caught a 1,135-pound (515 kg) Pacific black marlin off Cabo Blanco, a record for the time. He was the first to catch a blue marlin off Bimini and the second, after Hemingway, to catch an Atlantic bluefin tuna there.

Farrington's other great love was rail transport. Over the course of his life Farrington rode trains in 39 countries, amassing thousands of miles. Farrington wrote ten books on the railroad history, "with an emphasis...on what was new in railroading." The American historian John H. White Jr. called Farrington a "skilled writer."

Farrington married Sara Houston Chisholm, who became an accomplished angler in her own right, in East Hampton in 1934. Farrington lived in East Hampton until his death in 1983.

== Selected works ==
- Atlantic game fishing (1937)
- Pacific game fishing (1942)
- Bill, the broadbill swordfish (1942)
- Railroading from the head end (1943)
- Railroads at war (1944)
- Giants of the rails (1944)
- Interesting birds of our country (1945)
- Ducks came back, the story of Ducks unlimited (1945)
- Railroading from the rear end (1946)
- Book of fishes (1946)
- Ships of the U.S. Merchant Marine (1947)
- Fishing the Atlantic, offshore and on (1949)
- Sport fishing boats (1949)
- Railroads of today (1949)
- Railroading the modern way (1951)
- Fishing the Pacific, offshore and on (1953)
- Railroading around the world (1955)
- Railroads of the hour (1958)
- Fishing with Hemingway and Glassell (1971)
- Skates, sticks, and men; the story of amateur hockey in the United States (1971)
- Santa Fe's big three; the life story of a trio of the world's greatest locomotives (1972)
- Trail of the Sharp Cup; the story of the fifth oldest trophy in international sports (1974)
- Railroading coast to coast : riding the locomotive cabs, steam, electric and diesel, 1923-1950 (1976)
- Labrador retriever, friend and worker (1976)
