= Auxis eudorax =

Scientific classification
- Kingdom: Animalia
- Phylum: Chordata
- Class: Actinopterygii
- Order: Scombriformes
- Family: Scombridae
- Genus: Auxis
- Species: A. eudorax

Binomial name
- Auxis eudorax Collette & Aadland, 1996

Synonyms
- Auxis rochei eudorax

Species of tuna

Auxis eudorax is a species of tuna in the family Scombridae. It is a pelagic marine species native to the Eastern Pacific, where it has been reported from mainland Ecuador, the Galápagos, Mexico, Panama, and the United States. The species reaches 36.5 cm (14.4 inches) in fork length.
