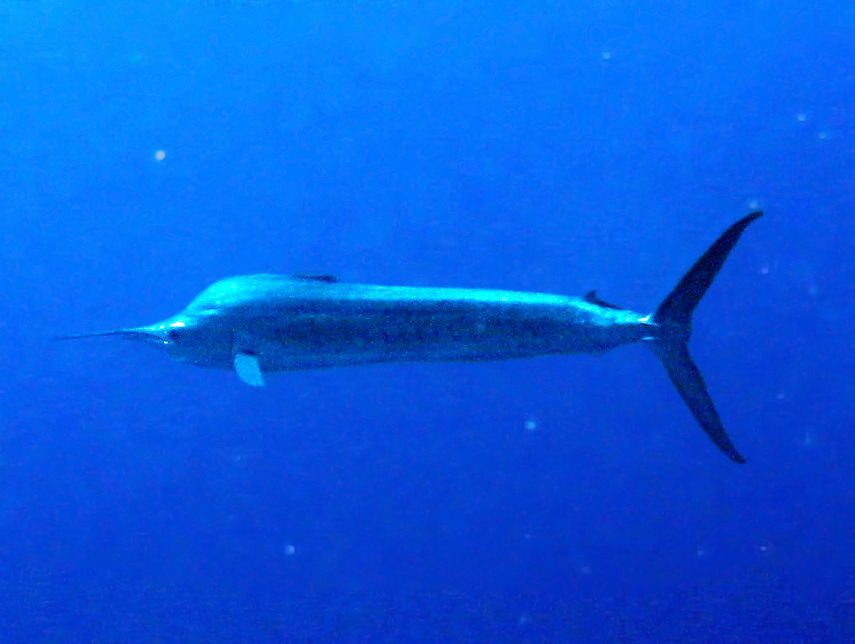
- Makaira mazara from French Polynesia

Scientific classification
- Kingdom: Animalia
- Phylum: Chordata
- Class: Actinopterygii
- Order: Carangiformes
- Suborder: Menoidei
- Superfamily: Xiphioidea
- Family: Istiophoridae
- Genus: Makaira
- Species: M. mazara

Binomial name
- Makaira mazara Jordan & Snyder, 1901

Synonyms
- Eumakaira nigra Hirasaka & Nakamura, 1947; Istiompax howardi Whitley, 1954; Istiompax mazara (Jordan & Snyder, 1901); Makaira ampla subsp. mazara (Jordan & Schneider, 1901); Makaira nigra (Hirasaka & Nakamura, 1947); Makaira nigricans subsp. mazara (Jordan & Snyder, 1901); Tetrapturus mazara Jordan & Snyder, 1901

= Indo-Pacific blue marlin =

Species of fish

The Indo-Pacific blue marlin (Makaira mazara) is a species of marlin belonging to the family Istiophoridae.

== Taxonomy ==
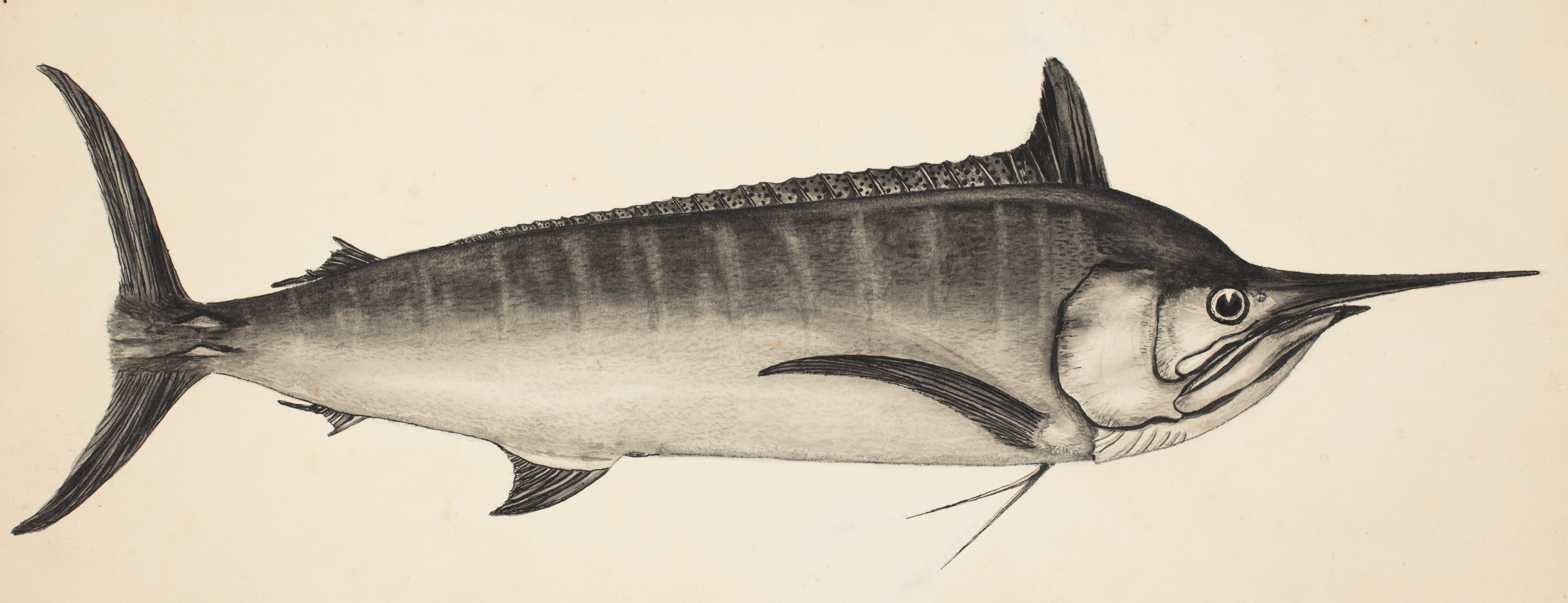
1920s drawing of Makaira mazara by Louis Thomas Griffin

Makaira mazara is closely related to, and usually considered conspecific with, the Atlantic blue marlin, then simply called blue marlin.

The classification of the Indo-Pacific blue marlin (M. mazara) and the Atlantic blue marlin (M. nigricans) as separate species is under debate. Genetic data suggest, although the two groups are isolated from each other, that they are both the same species, with the only genetic exchange occurring when Indo-Pacific blue marlin migrate to and contribute genes to the Atlantic population. A separate study by V. P. Buonaccorsi, J. R. Mcdowell, and Graves indicated that both Indo-Pacific and Atlantic show "striking phylogeographic partitioning" of mitochondrial and microsatellite loci. Some authorities still consider them both distinct.

== Distribution and habitat ==
This species can be found throughout the tropical and sub-tropical waters of the Pacific and Indian Oceans. Warm currents such as the Agulhas Current in the western Indian Ocean have a major influence on their seasonal distribution. It is common in equatorial waters, but it is not usually seen close to islands and coral reefs. It is considered the most tropical billfish species.

== Description ==
Makaira mazara can reach a maximum length of 5 metres (16 ft), but the average is around 3.5 metres (11 ft). It can reach a weight of about 625 kilograms (1,378 lb). The body is elongated but it is not very compressed, with two dorsal fins and two anal fins. The dorsal fins have a total of 40 to 45 soft rays, while the anal fins have 18 to 24 soft rays. The pectoral fins, which have 21 to 23 rays, are falcate and flexible, and can be drawn in to the sides of the body. The nape is highly elevated. The upper jaw forms a robust but not very long beak, round in cross section. The caudal peduncle shows strong double keels on each side. The body color is blue-black dorsally and silvery white ventrally, sometimes with light blue vertical stripes.

== Biology ==
Spawning takes place during summer in both the Indian and Pacific Oceans. In the southern hemisphere, spawning probably occurs around French Polynesia. Makaira mazara is a highly migratory species. These marlins use their bill for inflicting wounds on their prey.
