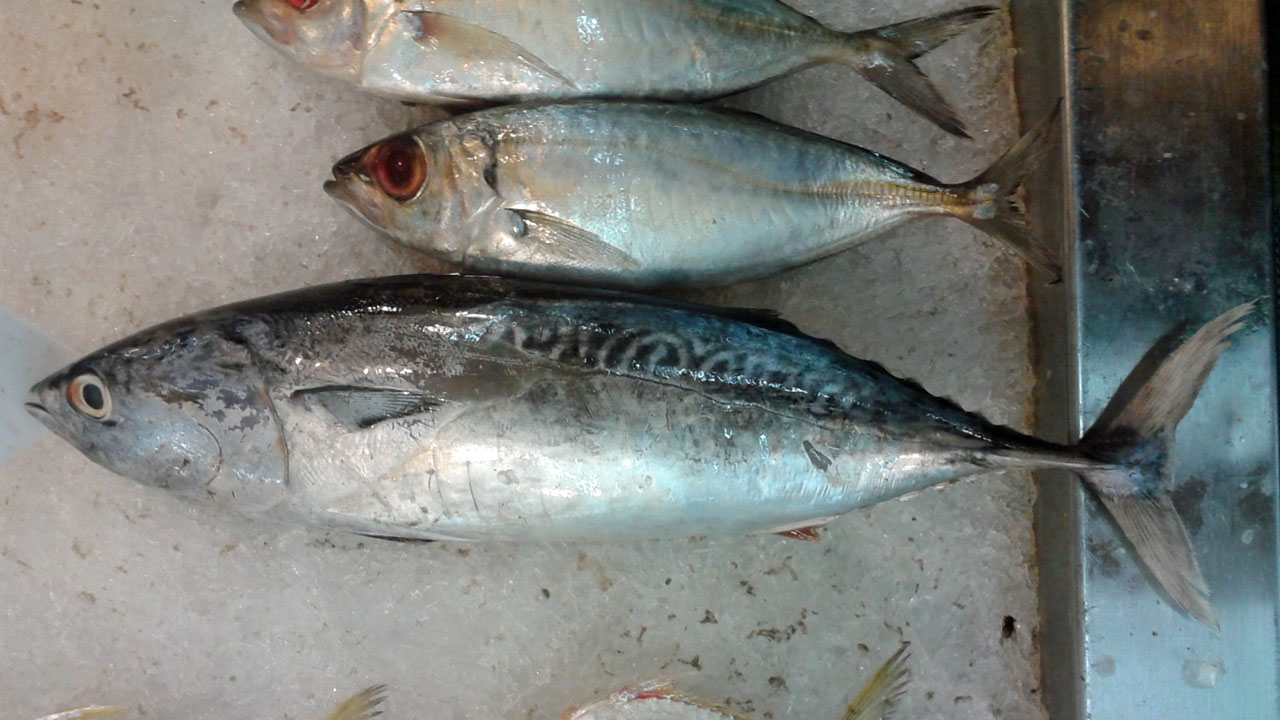
- Auxis thazard (bottom)

Conservation status
- Least Concern (IUCN 3.1)

Scientific classification
- Kingdom: Animalia
- Phylum: Chordata
- Class: Actinopterygii
- Division: Teleostei
- Order: Scombriformes
- Family: Scombridae
- Genus: Auxis
- Species: A. thazard

Binomial name
- Auxis thazard (Lacépède, 1800)

Synonyms
- Scomber thazard Lacepède, 1800; Scomber taso Cuvier, 1832; Auxis tapeinosoma Bleeker, 1854; Auxis hira Kishinouye, 1915

= Frigate tuna =

Frigate tuna (Alagaduwa)

Species of ray-finned fish

The frigate tuna, frigate mackerel or alagaduwa (Auxis thazard) is a species of tuna, in the family Scombridae, found around the world in tropical oceans. The eastern Pacific population is now regarded as a separate species by some authorities, Auxis brachydorax.

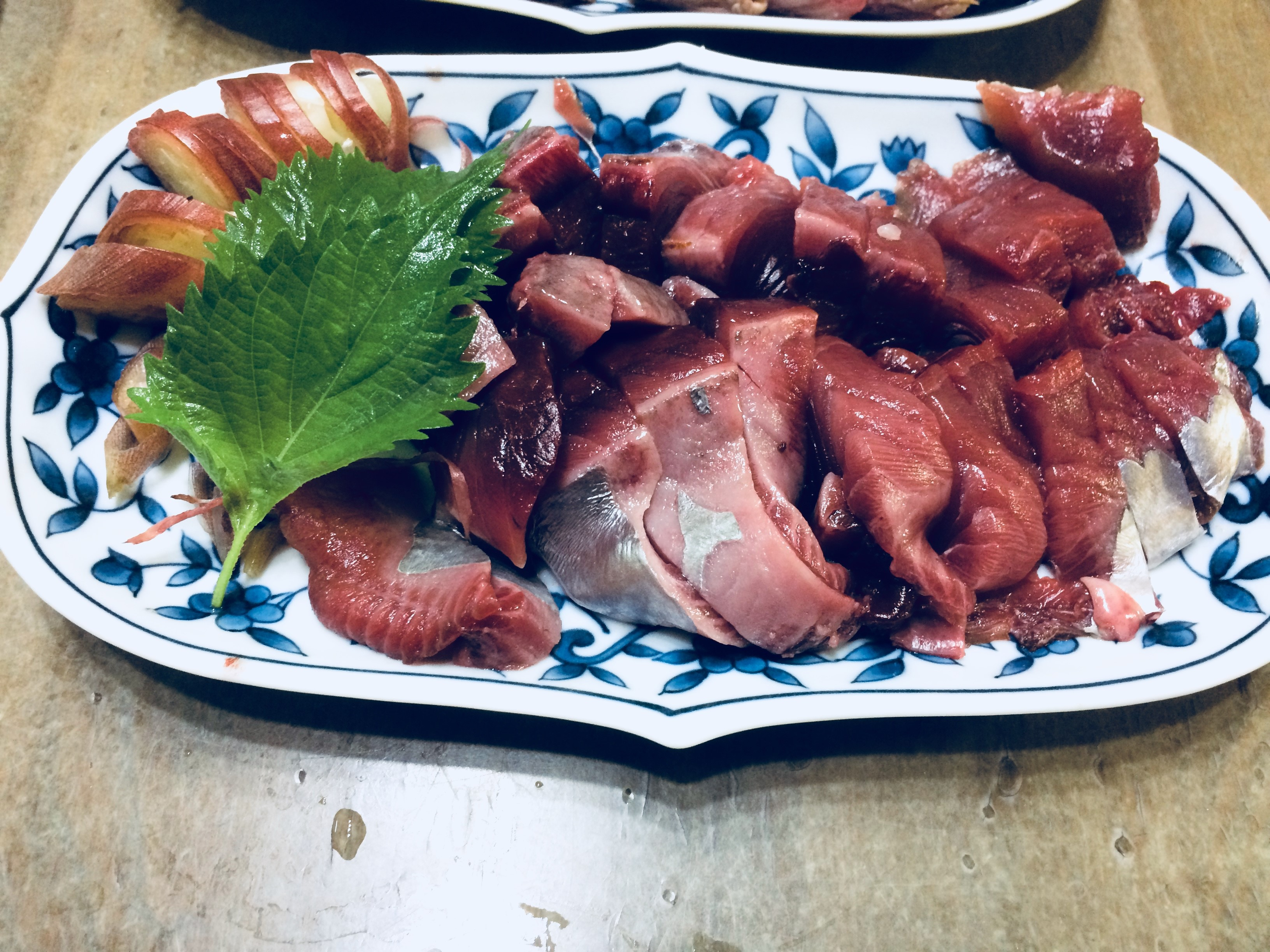
Sashimi made of frigate tuna

== Parasites ==
As most fishes, the frigate tuna harbours a number of parasites. Among these are a series of digeneans, which are parasitic within the intestine.
