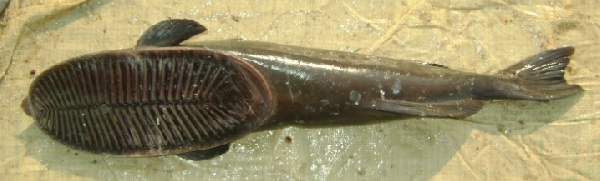

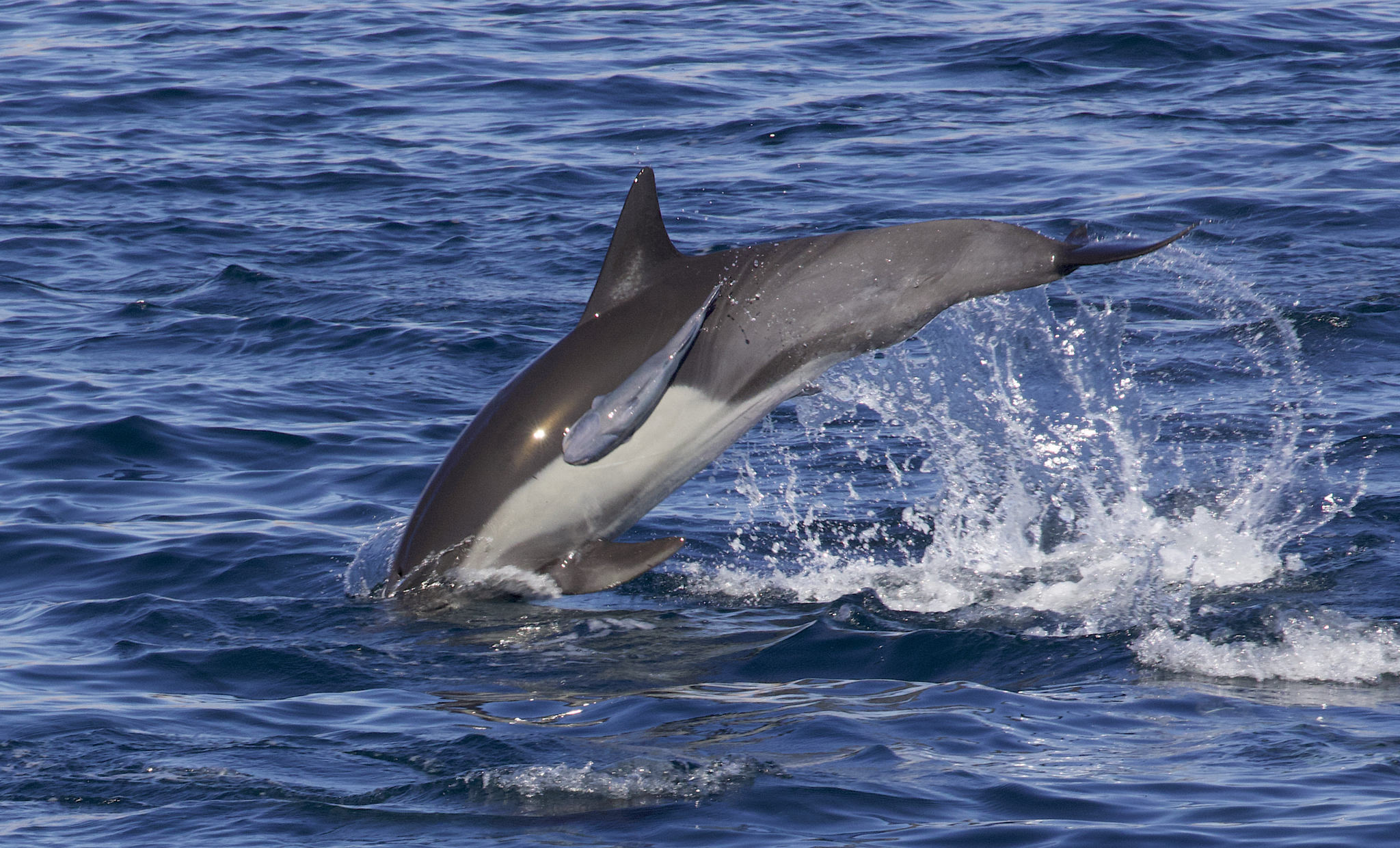
- On a common dolphin

Conservation status
- Least Concern (IUCN 3.1)

Scientific classification
- Kingdom: Animalia
- Phylum: Chordata
- Class: Actinopterygii
- Division: Teleostei
- Order: Carangiformes
- Suborder: Carangoidei
- Family: Echeneidae
- Genus: Remora
- Species: R. australis

Binomial name
- Remora australis (F. D. Bennett, 1840)

Synonyms
- Echeneis australis F. D. Bennett, 1840; Remilegia australis (F. D. Bennett, 1840); Echeneis scutata Günther, 1860; Remora scutata (Günther, 1860)

= Whalesucker =

Species of fish

The whalesucker (Remora australis) is a species of remora in the family Echeneidae, so named because it attaches itself exclusively to cetaceans, in a mutualistic interaction. It is found worldwide in tropical and warm waters; in the Gulf of Mexico and western Atlantic Ocean, it occurs from Texas to Brazil, and in the eastern Pacific Ocean, it occurs from Vancouver Island to Chile. It is the rarest member of the remora family, though this may reflect more the uncommon collection of cetaceans in the wild rather than the whalesucker's actual abundance.

== Morphology ==
The adhesive disk atop the head of the whalesucker is the largest amongst the remoras, bearing 25–28 lamellae and measuring 47–59% of the standard length. The head itself measures 26–28% of the standard length. The dorsal fin rays number 23–26, the anal fin rays 24–26, and the pectoral fin rays 22–24. The jaws contain numerous large, stout canine teeth; the palatine and lingual patches are absent, and there are 17–20 gill rakers. The coloration is uniform brown, dark brown, or greyish-brown on the head, trunk, and fins. Whalesuckers observed off Fernando de Noronha ranged from light grey to slate grey, with lighter fin margins. The smaller individuals are barred or blotched, while individuals over 35 cm (14 in) long have yellowish fins. This species can reach 76 cm (30 in) in total length.

The whalesucker shares similar homologous structures to each living species of Echeneidae: each has a strong lower jaw, projecting forward and upward that becomes nearly horizontal to the surface of each remora's adhesion disk. Additionally, remoras' ability to move across the skin of their hosts allows them to shovel other parasites and detritus stuck on the host's body into their mouth, which leavens extra effort made by the remora. The functionality of the adhesion disc relies on friction and suction to keep the whalesucker attached to its host. Small spinules located in the lamellae (the layer of tissue in the whalesucker's epidermal region), use friction by rotating the lamellae inside the disc to resist drag. A layer of thick epithelium (layer of cells that lines hollow organs and glands) seals the edge of the disc, lamellae, and median septum, which creates equalization of pressure and allows the whalesucker to attach to its neighbor.

However, whalesuckers can still lose their suction abilities through unequalization of pressure, as attaching to specific host organisms can render an unequal amount of force required for the fish to attach to its host, causing seep to emerge from outside of the disc, and lose its suction adhesion. The cranial veins of the remora also differ from other species of fish: they are larger and are placed ventral to the dorsal disc on the fish's cranium. As opposed to other species that merely rely on their jaw grip to latch onto prey, the interconnection between these veins, the brain, and the ventral surface of the remora allows it to work as a hydraulic press when using the adhesive disc to allow for pressurization equilibrium during attachment.

== Mutualism ==
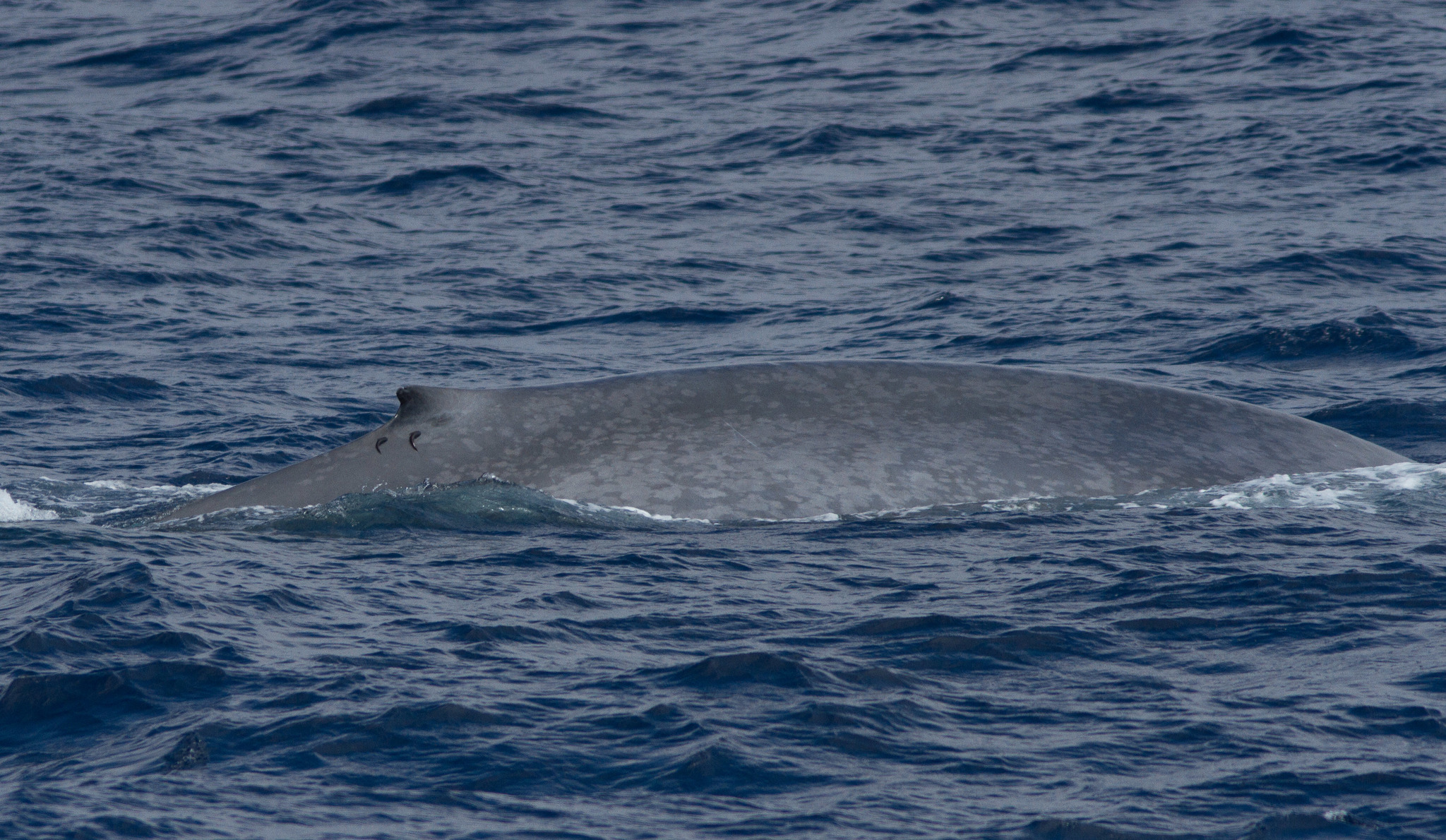
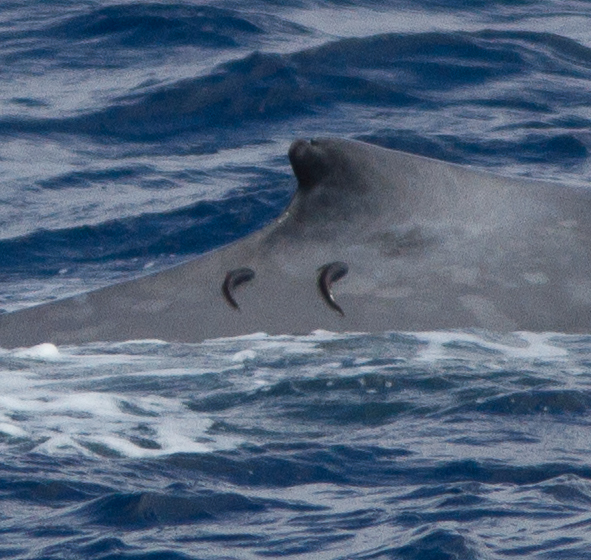
On a blue whale

The most common host of the whalesucker appears to be the blue whale. Chitinous material indicative of parasitic copepods or amphipods have been found in the stomachs of whalesuckers, suggesting a mutualistic relationship with their hosts. Off Fernando de Noronha, whalesuckers down to small (4 to 9 cm [1.6 to 3.5 in]) juveniles are associated with spinner dolphins, and are likely recruited year-round from flotsam. The whalesuckers, no more than three to a host, usually attach to the flanks or belly of the dolphin, which may serve to minimize drag and facilitate feeding. When approached, they, especially small individuals, will shift to the opposite side of the host for protection. Whalesuckers impose a hydrodynamic cost to their host, their adhesive disks can abrade the skin, and they sometimes attach to inconvenient locations, such as near the blowhole or the genitals. The spinning behavior of dolphins, sharks, and other remora hosts has been proposed as a means of dislodging them. The whalesuckers feed on parasites and sloughed-off skin, and also forage on feces and vomit from the dolphins.

The R. australis will stick onto blue whales and stay attached when the whale surfaces, briefly emerging from the water themselves. Similar to its behavior with dolphins, whalesuckers are also known to change their position when feeding off blue whales, to avoid predation. While eliminating parasites from the whale, the whalesucker benefits by avoiding predators. The chance of mating also increases through habitual migration and food availability (i.e. parasites or food droppings).

It has been theorized that whalesuckers prefer to swim near blue whales to reduce drag, and allowing the whalesucker to stay near its host. The median speed of a blue whale speed hovers at about 2.1±0.5 m s−1 (7.6±1.8 km h−1) and at 3.9±0.8 m s−1 (14±2.9 km h−1), which is doubled for the remora, given its much smaller 1 metre (3 ft 3 in) stature. Whalesuckers appear able to match the speed of blue whales, having the ability to skim and swim near the whale's surface before attachment. Using its adhesive disc, the whalesucker attaches directly behind the whale's blowhole, directly on, behind, and above the pectoral fin, and next to or behind the dorsal fin. This way, the whalesucker can keep itself constantly near the whale while resisting drag both while it swims freely, and when it attaches to its host. It has also been observed through this movement that it prefers to keep away from the ventral surface to avoid sea bird predators.

== Evolution ==
One of the whalesucker's most outstanding traits, shared among the Echeinedae family, is an adhesive disk. The adhesive disk is a round, oval, sucking disk located on the top of a remora's head, with two layers of lamellae that allow for the remora to stick and unstick to the epidermal surfaces of larger fish, mainly cetaceans. Evolved from dorsal fin spines, the disc is thought to have evolved to allow individuals to attach to rough surfaces using their teeth. The average length of a whalesucker's adhesive disc is about 11 to 19 cm. There have been previous arguments that the morphology relating to the whalesucker's origins belonged to the Opisthomyzonidae genus, which existed during the Oligocene era. However, this species has a fully formed disc, an equal-length jaw, a long head, a large body, and a short but deep caudal peduncle, which is the base of its forked caudal fin, a muscle in the tail that allows the fish to swim forward.

Recent studies of the Opithomyzonidae have found flaws in its perceived ancestry to the whalesucker due to its comparatively low six-to-eight-disc lamellae and lack of the adhesion disc's migration to the fish's skull. Additionally, there is a lack of consistency of timing between earlier ancestors of the whalesucker and the Opisthomyzon's development of intercalary bones (additional skeletal elements arising between other bony structures) and posterior laminae after the disc's migration. It is more likely that the Opisthomyzon was the recent common ancestor of the Phtheirichthys family, the sister group to the extant remora. What is speculated, is that the changes in the disc's length most likely occurred through performance-based natural selection through friction against surfaces of larger animals.

Each increase is said to help the remora attach to host organisms, and each species of fish diverged from one another to develop adhesive disks to attach to specific larger organisms based on their disk's effectiveness. Specifically, each increase allows Echinidae species to develop better suction against tougher exteriors of sea mammals, including more dangerous species such as tiger sharks or hammerhead sharks. The behaviors of the whalesucker can be easily traced to other extant relatives within the Echinidae family. The closest relative of the whalesucker is the cobia (black salmon; Rachycentron canadum). While the black salmon does not share the same feature of the adhesive disc as the whalesucker, both exhibited behaviors that enabled them to stay close to their host organisms for protection and resources. The whalesucker's true homologous origins may not be confirmed, its relationship to its phylogenetic relatives shows a similarity in both its morphology and behavior towards dolphins and blue whales.
