= LRRC73 =

Human gene

Identifiers
- Aliases: LRRC73, C6orf154, leucine rich repeat containing 73
- External IDs: MGI: 2684934; GeneCards: LRRC73

Gene location (Human)
Chr.	Chromosome 6 (human)
Band	6p21.1	Start	43,506,969 bp
Band	6p21.1	End	43,510,686 bp

Gene location (Mouse)
Chr.	Chromosome 17 (mouse)
Band	17|17 C	Start	46,564,457 bp
Band	17|17 C	End	46,568,241 bp
RNA expression pattern
Bgee	Human / Mouse (ortholog); Top expressed in: left testis; right testis; gonad; bronchial epithelial cell; prefrontal cortex; right frontal lobe; dorsolateral prefrontal cortex; nucleus accumbens; cingulate gyrus; anterior cingulate cortex / Top expressed in: seminiferous tubule; visual cortex; supraoptic nucleus; primary visual cortex; superior frontal gyrus; spermatid; substantia nigra; hippocampus proper; piriform cortex; islet of Langerhans; More reference expression data
BioGPS	n/a
Orthologs
Databases	NCBI: entry; OMA: entry
Species	Human	Mouse
Entrez	221424	224813
Ensembl	ENSG00000204052	ENSMUSG00000071073
UniProt	Q5JTD7	B2RWC4
RefSeq (mRNA)	NM_001271882; NM_001012974	NM_001111142
RefSeq (protein)	NP_001012992; NP_001258811	NP_001104612
Location (UCSC)	Chr 6: 43.51 – 43.51 Mb	Chr 17: 46.56 – 46.57 Mb
PubMed search
- Wikidata
View/Edit Human	View/Edit Mouse

Leucine Rich Repeating Containing 73 (LRRC73) is a protein-coding gene, which, in Homo sapiens, is encoded by the LRRC73 gene..

Aliases: C6orf154, Chromosome 6 Open Reading Frame 154

Bioinformation: Accession number: NM_001012974.4 (mRNA), NP_001012992 (Protein); Genomic location: NC_000006.12: 43506968-43510346 (-)

== Gene ==
In the human genome, LRRC73 is located on chromosome 6, specifically at 6p21.1, on the negative-sense strand. The LRRC73 sequence spans 1,782 base pairs, consisting of 6 exons. The LRRC73 gene has one protein-coding sequence.

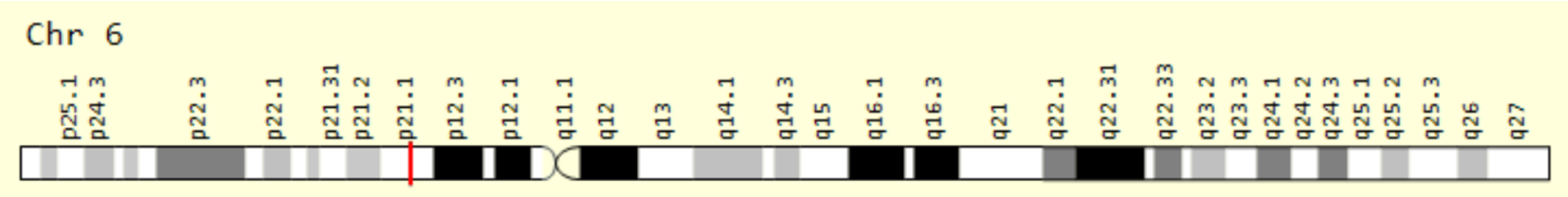
Location of LRRC73 on the P-arm of Chromosome 6

== mRNA ==
LRRC73 mRNA encodes three protein isoforms. Two of which are encoded from complete transcripts, while the remaining isoform is truncated and only carboxyl (COOH) terminus complete.

Alternate Isoforms
Isoform Variant	Accession #	Length (nt)	Exons^{9}	Protein Isoform	Accession #	Length (aa)
Variant 1	NM_001012974.4	1,782	1,2,3,4,5,6	1	NP_001012992.1	316
Variant 2	NM_001271882.2	1,090	1,2,3,4,5,6	2	NP_001258811.1	193

== Protein ==
LRRC73 protein consists of 2 isoforms. Isoform one stands as the longer isoform composed of 316 amino acids. Isoform two stands as the smaller isoform and is lacking part of the 5’ coding region and has a shorter N-terminus with 193 amino acids. LRRC73 is a leucine-rich repeat-containing protein mostly involved in mediating protein-protein interactions.

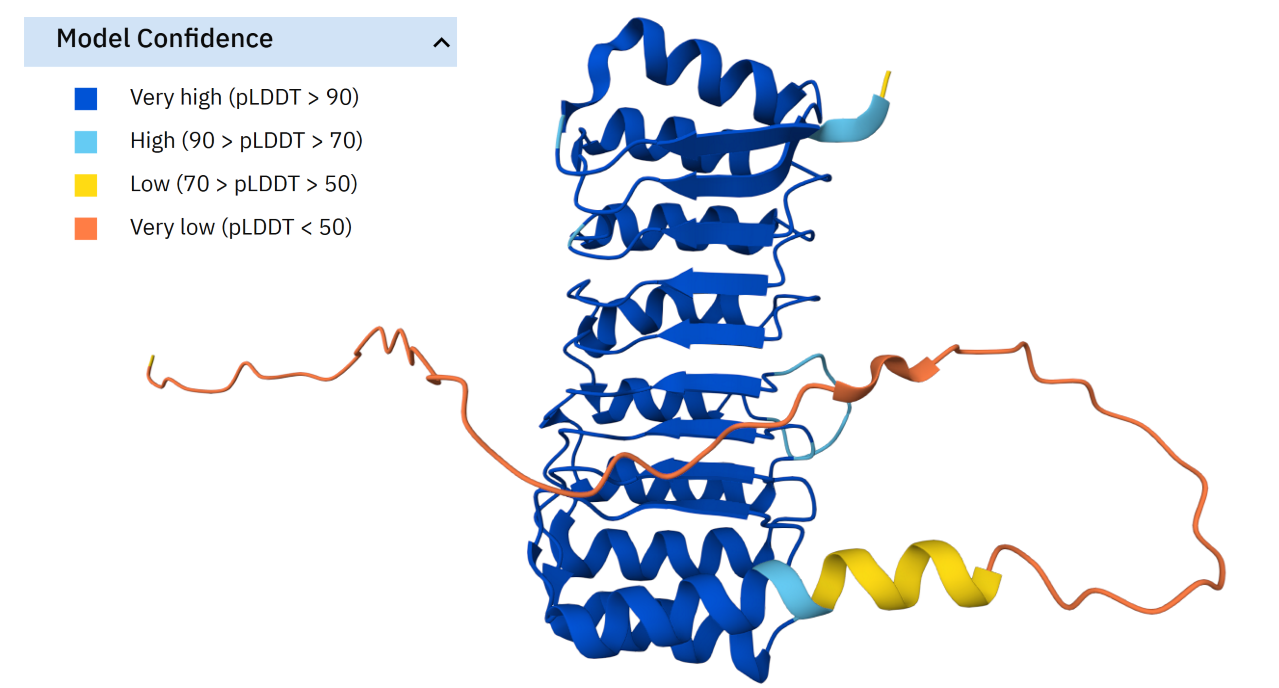
Predicted tertiary structure of LRRC73 protein. Image adopted and modified from Alpha-Fold.

=== Composition ===
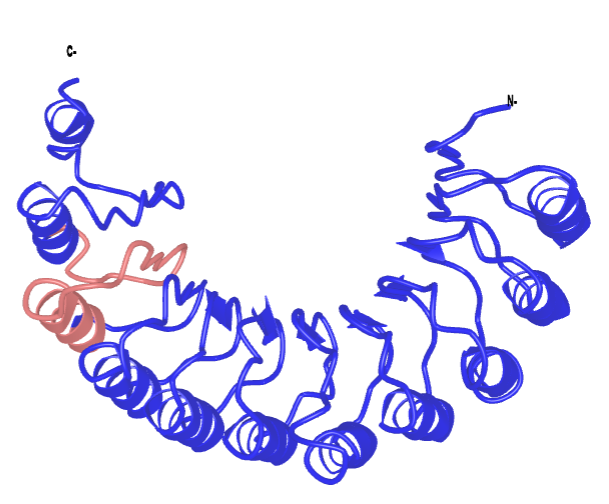
Predicted tertiary structure of LRRC73 from I-Tasser with the localized negative charge cluster highlighted with iCn3D.

LRRC73 Isoform 1 has a theoretical molecular weight of 33 KDa and theoretical isoelectric point of 4.73. Amino acid composition analysis indicates the human LRRC73 protein to have lower-than-normal levels of phenylalanine, lysine, tyrosine, and higher-than-normal levels of leucine. LRRC73 exhibited a highly hydrophobic core (LVIFM 28%-32%), a localized negative charge cluster from residues 245 to 274 which consists of 11 acidic residues within a 30-residue window, along with an absence of transmembrane regions.

=== Motifs and modification sites ===
Motifscan predicted seven LRRC73 protein motifs through NCBI-CDD. Most of these motifs correspond to leucine-rich repeat (LRR) families. The most significant matches, based on E-values, include the RAN GTPase-activating protein, as well as, LRR_RI and generic LRR motifs from residues spanning from 5-255.

No transmembrane helices, catalytic signatures, linear motifs, or phosphorylation were found. The remaining three motifs for LRRC73 consist of E-values above significant thresholds and were therefore not further interpreted.

Motifs for human protein LRRC73 isoform 1
NCBI-CDD	Position	Description	E-value
444072	28..254	COG5238, RNA1, Ran GTPase-activating protein (RanGAP) involved in mRNA processing and transport [Translation, ribosomal structure and biogenesis].	7.00E-20
238064	5..255	cd00116, LRR_RI, Leucine-rich repeats (LRRs), ribonuclease inhibitor (RI)-like subfamily.	1.00E-16
443914	49..243	COG4886, LRR, Leucine-rich repeat (LRR) protein [Transcription].	2.00E-06
275380	50..243	sd00033, LRR_RI, leucine-rich repeats, ribonuclease inhibitor (RI)-like subfamily.	1.00E-04
236849	158..223	PRK11109, PRK11109, fused PTS fructose transporter subunit IIA/HPr protein.	0.14
215382	188..227	PLN02712, PLN02712, arogenate dehydrogenase.	0.57
275378	139..243	sd00031, LRR_1, leucine-rich repeats.	0.86

=== Protein interactions ===
LRRC73 is situated in a genomic locus alongslide yip1 domain family member 3 (YIPF3) upstream and tight junction associated protein 1 (TJAP1) downstream.

==== Human proteins ====
- ANKRD13D (Ankyrin repeat domain-containing protein 13D)
- TEPSIN (AP-4 complex accessory subunit Tepsin)
- VSIG10 (V-set and immunoglobulin domain containing 10)
- DOCK3 (Dedicator of cytokinesis protein 3)
- TBC1D5 (TBC1 domain family member 5)
- NPRL2 (GATOR complex protein NPRL2)
- POLR3H (DNA-directed RNA polymerase III subunit RPC8)
- OR10A4 (Olfactory receptor 10A4)
- VPS26B (Vacuolar protein sorting-associated protein 26B)
- VPS35 (Vacuolar protein sorting-associated protein 35)

=== Conceptual translation ===
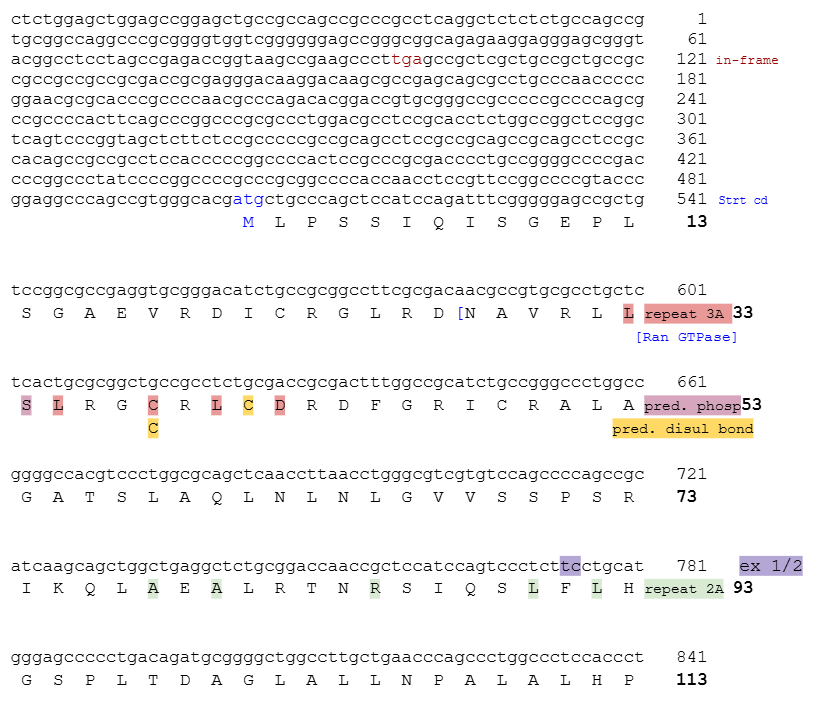
Conceptual translation of orthologs Conceptual translation of orthologs Conceptual translation of Leucine rich repeat 73

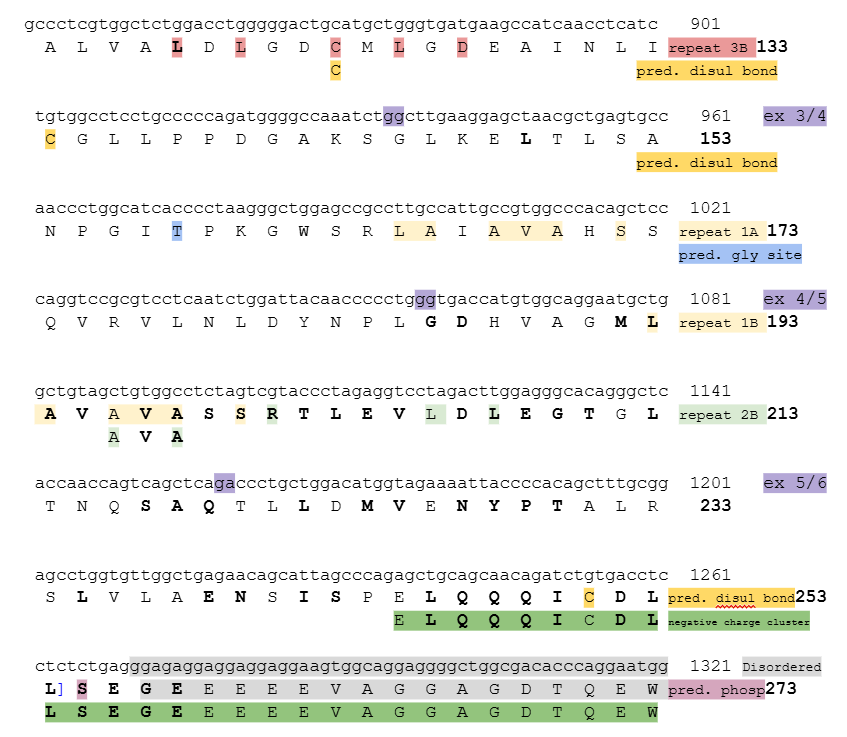
Conceptual translation of orthologs

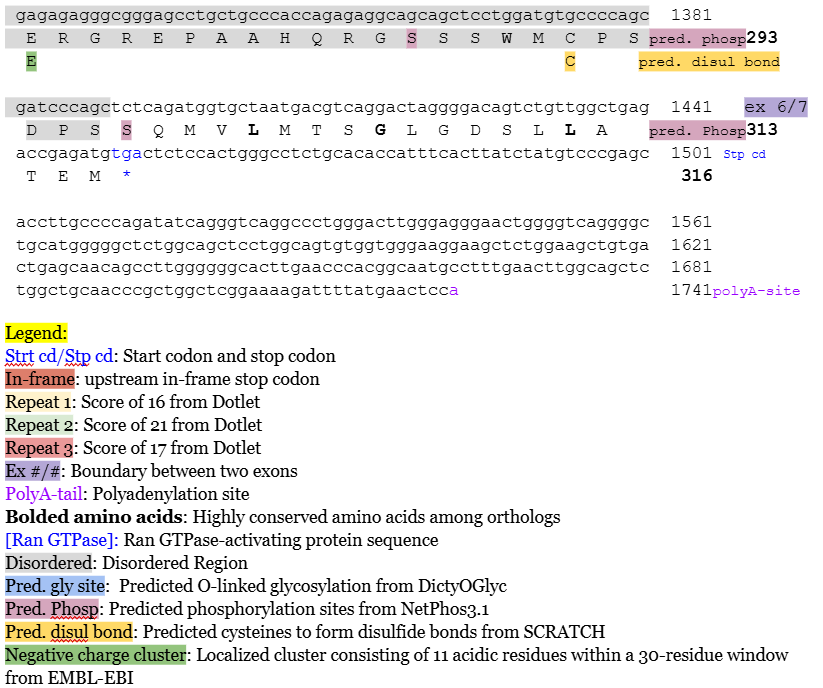
Key for Homo sapiens LRRC73 conceptual translation.

== Tissue localization and expression ==
=== Localization ===
LRRC73 is predicted to be located intracellularly, the protein is sublocalized to the cytosol and nuclear bodies. Expression patterns include ciliary rootlets of glandular cells within the fallopian tube, respiratory epithelia, and the nuclei of cells in seminiferous ducts.

=== Expression ===
LRRC73 showed little to no expression across most human tissues in the body. The highest expression levels have been observed in the adrenal gland, brain, and testis. RNA sequencing of total RNA from 20 human tissues showed mean expression of approximately 0.401 RPKM in the adrenal gland and 0.662 RPKM in the brain. HPA RNA-seq normal tissues showed mean expression levels of 12.679 ± 5.142 RPKM in the testis.

Protein abundance data from PaxDB indicated low protein expression of LRRC73 in testis, with an abundance of approximately 0.33 parts per million (ppm), ranking 10199 out of 15744.

== Homology ==
=== Orthologs ===
LRRC73 Orthologs and Related Properties
	Genus and Species	Common Name	Taxonomic Group	Date of Divergence from the Human Lineage (MYA)	Accession Number	Sequence Length (aa)	Sequence Identity to Human Protein	Sequence Similarity to Human Protein
Mammalia	Homo sapiens	Humans	Primates	0 MYA	NP_001012992.1	316	100%	100%
	Mus musculus	House Mouse	Rodentia	87 MYA	NP_001104612.1	316	98.73%	99.10%
	Balaenoptera acutorostrata	Minke whale	Artiodactyla	94 MYA	XP_007193842.1	316	99.68%	99.70%
	Chrysochloris asiatica	Cape golden mole	Afrosoricida	99 MYA	XP_006860555.1	316	97.15%	99.10%
Birds	Oenanthe melanoleuca	Eastern black-eared wheatear	Passeriformes	319 MYA	XP_056342448.1	313	85.88%	80.60%
	Struthio camelus	African ostrich	Struthioniformes	319 MYA	XP_009684978.2	303	80.06%	88.00%
	Numenius arquata	Eurasian curlew	Charadriiformes	319 MYA	XP_074025247.1	318	79.13%	88.20%
	Pezoporus wallicus	Ground Parrot	Psittaciformes	319 MYA	XP_057271434.1	303	79.11%	88.30%
Reptilia	Emydura macquarii macquarii	Murray River turtle	Testudines	319 MYA	XP_067420797.1	303	79.43%	87.00%
	Gopherus flavomarginatus	Mexican gopher tortoise	Testudines	319 MYA	XP_050807631.1	303	79.43%	86.80%
	Carettochelys insculpta	Pitted-shelled turtle	Testudines	319 MYA	XP_074845841.1	303	79.11%	87.70%
	Pelodiscus sinensis	Chinese soft-shelled turtle	Testudines	319 MYA	XP_075781124.1	308	78.50%	86.90%
Amphibia	Eleutherodactylus coqui	Common coquí	Anura	352 MYA	XP_066450569.1	304	69.94%	81.00%
	Bufo bufo	Common toad	Anura	352 MYA	XP_040283598.1	304	69.06%	80.00%
	Pseudophryne corroboree	Corroboree frog	Anura	352 MYA	XP_063774856.1	302	68.04%	81.30%
	Pelobates fuscus	Common spadefoot toad	Anura	352 MYA	XP_063300254.1	302	67.72%	75.43%
Fish	Silurus meridionalis	Chinese large-mouth catfish	Siluriformes	429 MYA	XP_046731911.1	326	72.78%	81.80%
	Brienomyrus brachyistius	Baby Whale	Osteoglossiformes	429 MYA	XP_048865752.1	328	69.44%	79.50%
Cartilaginous fish	Hemitrygon akajei	Red stingray	Myliobatiformes	462 MYA	XP_072912304.1	305	73.10%	84.20%
	Callorhinchus milii	Elephant shark	Chondrichthyes	462 MYA	XP_007896433.1	263	61.08%	69.30%

Twenty orthologs of the LRRC73 protein were identified across various taxa, including mammals (97%-99%), birds (79%-85%), reptiles and amphibians (67%-79%), fish (69%-72%), and cartilaginous fish (61%-73%). Sequence identity data were derived using of NCBI’s BLAST, EMBOSS NEEDLE, and Timetree^{,}^{,}.

LRRC73 is seen to have no paralogs

=== Evolutionary divergence ===
The comparative LRRC73 evolutionary scatter plot illustrates the relationship between corrected percent divergence (m) and estimated date of divergence (million years ago) between the LRRC73 protein, fibrinogen alpha, and cytochrome c. Evolutionary rate comparisons place LRRC73 at an intermediate pace in comparison to the highly conserved cytochrome c and rapidly evolving fibrinogen alpha chain.

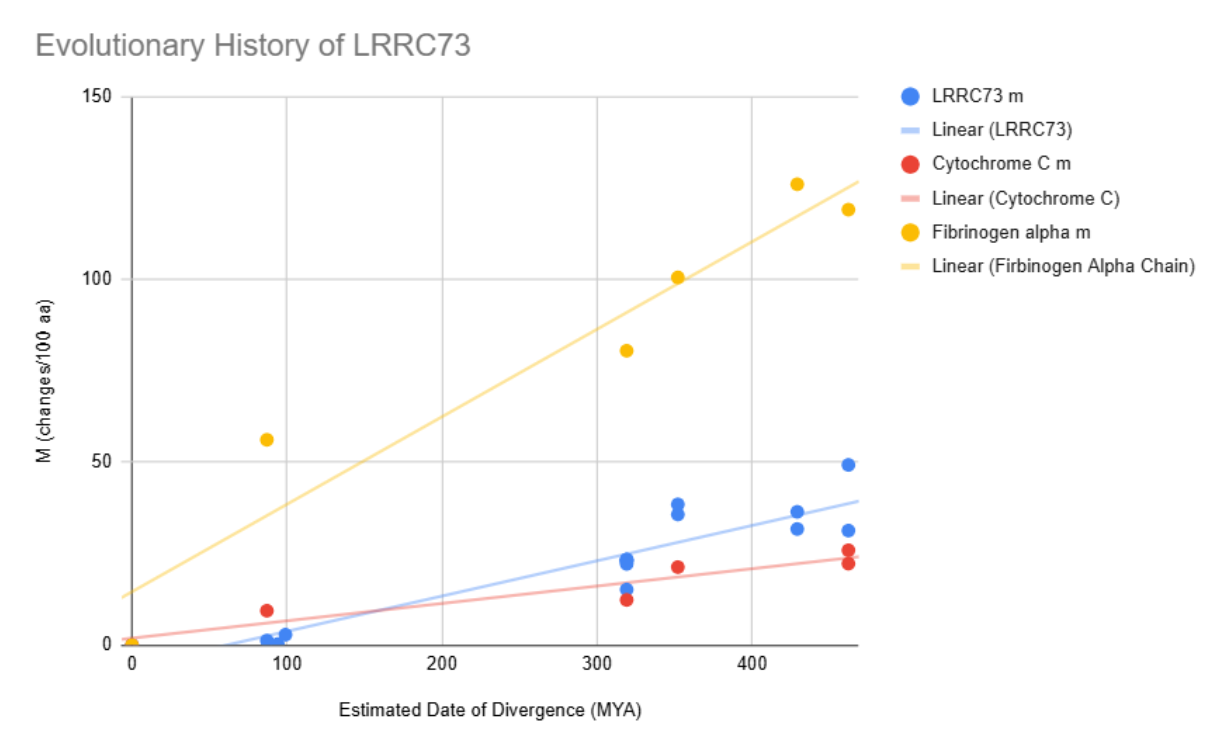
The evolutionary rate of LRRC73, fibrinogen alpha chain, and cytochrome C.

== Evolution ==
LRRC73 belongs to the leucine rich repeat containing (LRR) family, whose members share the conserved LRR domains. Orthologs of LRRC73 have been identified in vertebrate species and not in any invertebrates, with the first appearance found approximately between 400 and 500 million years ago in cartilaginous fishes.

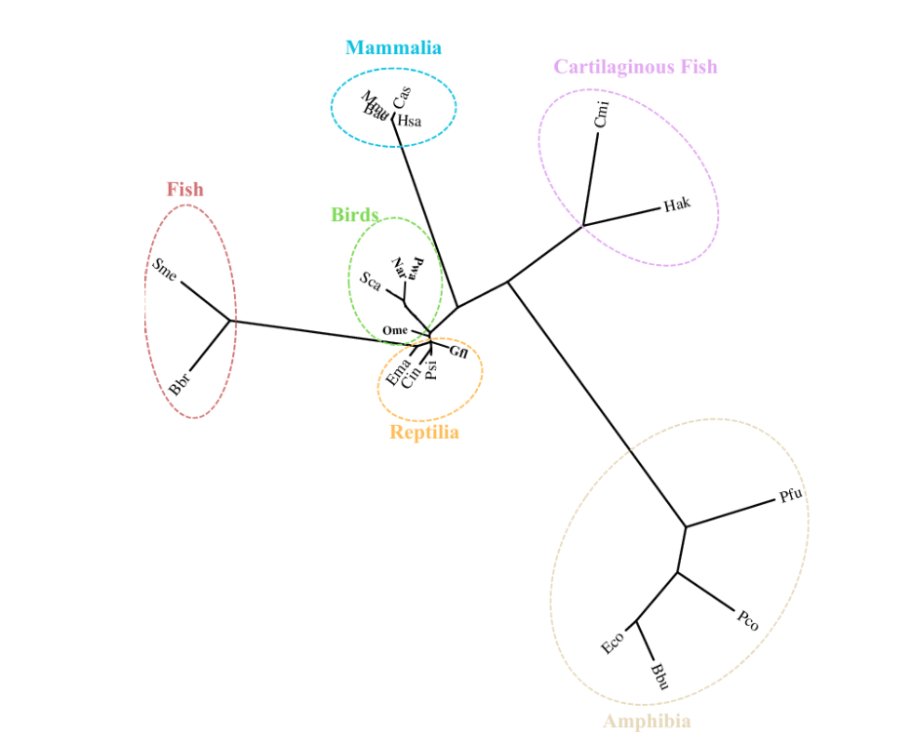
Unrooted phylogenetic tree displaying LRRC73 ancestry.

== Clinical significance ==
Genome-wide association studies (GWAS) have identified 95% credible sets that prioritize LRRC73 as a likely gene associated with placenta praevia. According to GeneCards, LRRC73 has also been reported to show an association with human cytomegalovirus (HCMV) infection, however, the clinical significance of this association has not been established.
