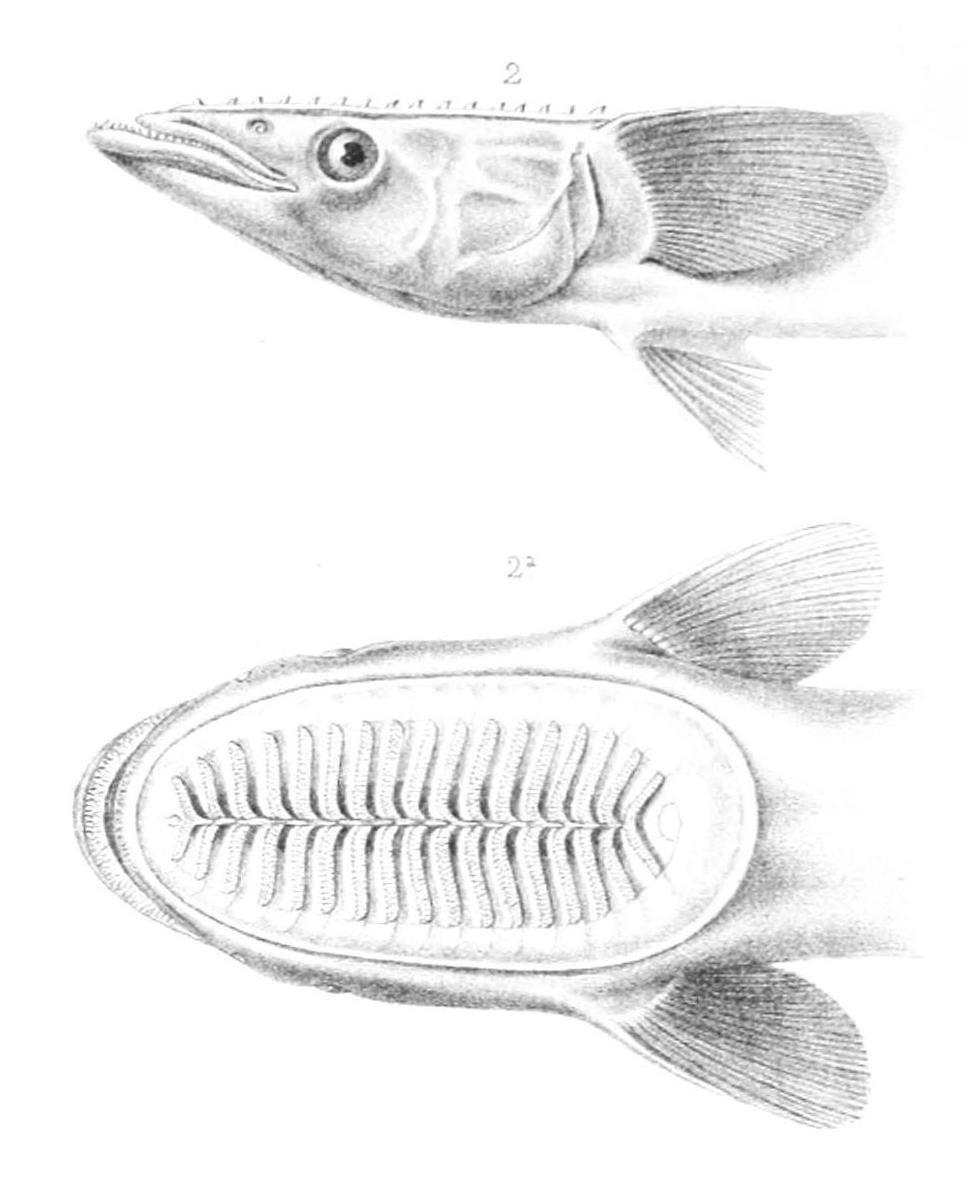
- Head seen from side and from above

Conservation status
- Data Deficient (IUCN 3.1)

Scientific classification
- Kingdom: Animalia
- Phylum: Chordata
- Class: Actinopterygii
- Order: Carangiformes
- Suborder: Carangoidei
- Family: Echeneidae
- Genus: Echeneis
- Species: E. neucratoides

Binomial name
- Echeneis neucratoides Zuiew, 1789

= Echeneis neucratoides =

Species of fish

The whitefin sharksucker (Echeneis neucratoides) or short-disk sharksucker, is a species of remora native to subtropical waters of the western Atlantic Ocean, Gulf of Mexico and Caribbean Sea. This fish can reach a length of 75 centimetres (30 in) TL though most fish do not exceed 50 centimetres (20 in) TL. It can be free-swimming, or can attach itself to a host fish or turtle by means of a sucker on the back of the head.

== Description ==
Echeneis neucratoides is a slender remora growing to a maximum length of about 75 cm (30 in). There are bands of small sharp teeth in both jaws, and further bands of teeth on the vomer and palate, as well as granular teeth on the tongue. On the top of the head is a large oval sucker, formed from the modified front dorsal fin, by which the fish attaches to a host fish. There are between 18 and 22 lamellae in this sucker as compared to the 23 to 28 possessed by the closely related Echeneis naucrates. The pelvic fins have narrow bases, the pectoral fins have moderately pointed tips and are composed of 22 rays, the hind dorsal fin has 32 to 41 rays and the anal fin, 30 to 38. The dorsal surface of the fish is dark brown to black, as is a broad longitudinal lateral stripe which extends from the eye through the pectoral fin to the caudal peduncle. The other parts of the fish are silvery-grey. The dorsal, pectoral and caudal fins are dark with whitish margins, particularly at the front of the fins.

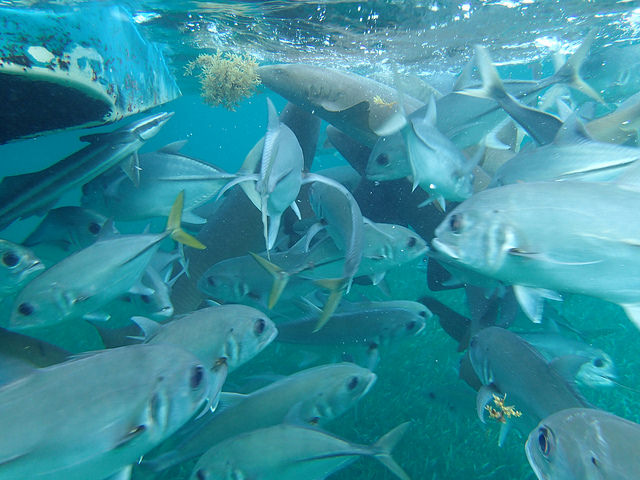
A Whitefin Sharksucker appears on the left side of this image, off San Pedro, Belize

== Distribution ==
This fish occurs in the subtropical western Atlantic Ocean, the Caribbean Sea and Gulf of Mexico, within an area bounded by 43°N and 4°N, and 98°W and 51°W that stretches from Massachusetts to the northern coast of South America, including the Bahamas and the Antilles. It is usually associated with reefs but also occurs further offshore.

== Ecology ==
Echeneis neucratoides is sometimes free-swimming, but at other times attaches itself with its sucker to a host animal such as a shark, other large fish or turtle. Remoras often feed on scraps of food discarded by their hosts, and may also consume the parasitic copepods on their skin.

== Status ==
The taxonomic status of this species has been questioned and molecular studies need to be done to clarify this. Its range seems to be rather more restricted than most other remoras and its population trend is unclear, although it faces no particular threats. Because of these factors, the International Union for Conservation of Nature has been unable to assess its conservation status, and has classified it as "data deficient".
