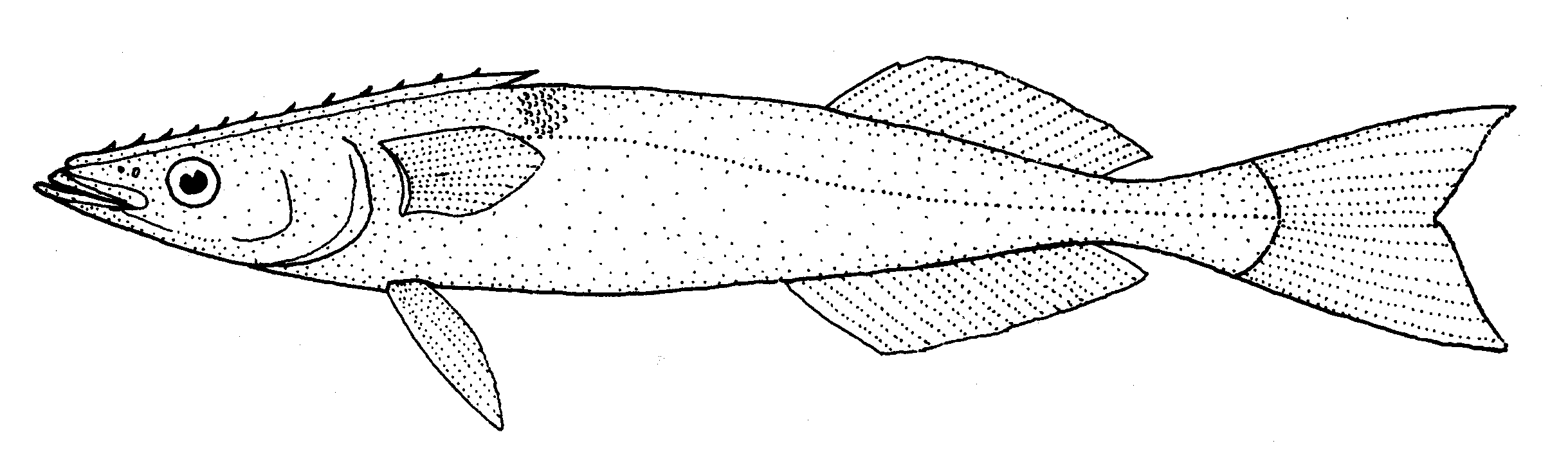
- Drawing by Dr Tony Ayling

Conservation status
- Least Concern (IUCN 3.1)

Scientific classification
- Kingdom: Animalia
- Phylum: Chordata
- Class: Actinopterygii
- Division: Teleostei
- Order: Carangiformes
- Suborder: Carangoidei
- Family: Echeneidae
- Genus: Remora
- Species: R. brachyptera

Binomial name
- Remora brachyptera (R. T. Lowe, 1839)

Synonyms
- Echeneis brachyptera R. T. Lowe, 1839; Echeneis sexdecimlamellata Eydoux & Gervais, 1837; Echeneis quatuordecimlaminatus D. H. Storer, 1839; Echeneis pallida Temminck & Schlegel, 1850; Echeneis nieuhofii Bleeker, 1853

= Spearfish remora =

Species of fish

The spearfish remora (Remora brachyptera) is a species of remora with a worldwide distribution in tropical and subtropical seas. Remoras attach themselves to other fish with a sucker on the head and this fish is almost exclusively found living on billfishes or swordfishes, and sometimes on sharks.

== Description ==
This species can reach 50 cm (20 in) in total length, though most do not exceed 25 cm (10 in). It is an elongated cylindrical fish, usually whitish or pale blue in life, but tan or dusky-brown when dead. The rather flattened head has an oblong disc or sucker with 14 to 17 transverse plates with which it clings to its host. The dorsal and anal fins are long and set far back on the body. The dorsal fin has between 27 and 34 soft rays, the pectoral fin has 23 to 27 rays and the anal fin 25 to 34 rays. The caudal fin has a straight edge. The sucker reaches no further than the pectoral fins, and the outer two-thirds of the pectoral rays are flexible. There are up to 21 gill rakers in the first branchial arch.

== Biology ==
The spearfish remora attaches itself with its disc to a host fish, with juveniles often attaching in the gill chambers. Host fish include the sailfish, the white marlin, the black marlin, the striped marlin and the swordfish; all of these fish swim faster than the remora, and it is not clear how the remora attaches to the host in the first place. The remora can move about the body surface of its host and is capable of short bursts of independent swimming. The diet includes parasitic copepods removed from the body of the host, but these do not seem to form such a large percentage of the diet of the spearfish remora as it does for the common remora (Remora remora). Although more than one remora can attach to a single host, it is not clear how remoras come together to breed.
