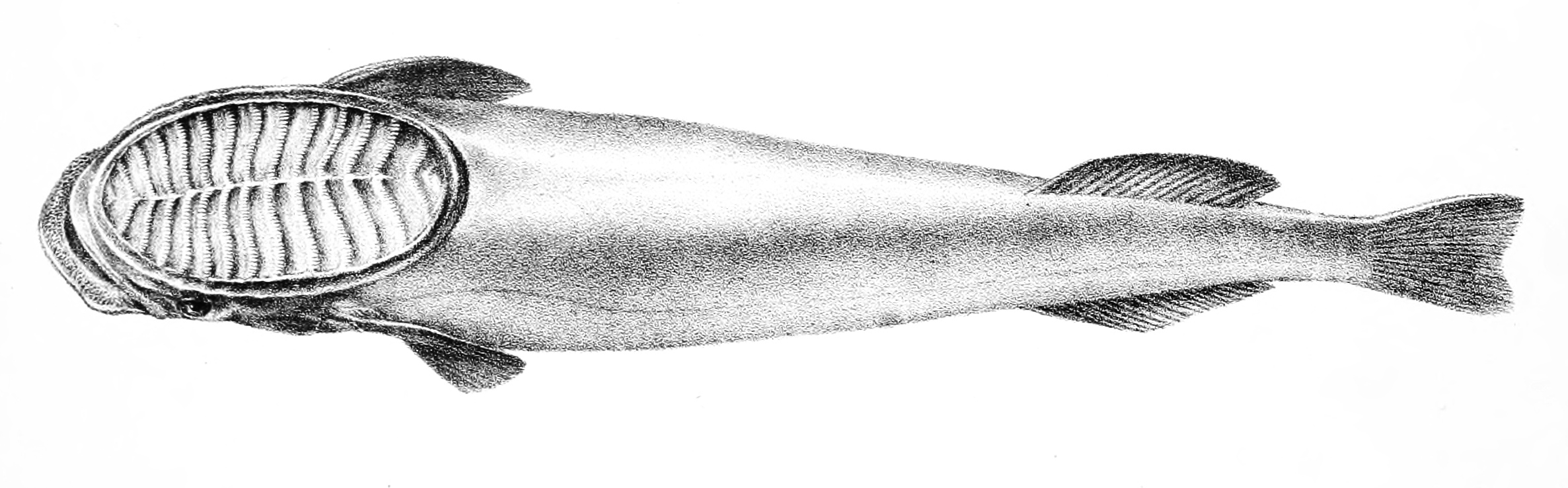

Conservation status
- Least Concern (IUCN 3.1)

Scientific classification
- Kingdom: Animalia
- Phylum: Chordata
- Class: Actinopterygii
- Division: Teleostei
- Order: Carangiformes
- Suborder: Carangoidei
- Family: Echeneidae
- Genus: Remora
- Species: R. albescens

Binomial name
- Remora albescens (Temminck & Schlegel, 1850)

Synonyms
- Echeneis albescens Temminck & Schlegel, 1850; Remorina albescens (Temminck & Schlegel, 1850); Echeneis clypeata Günther, 1860; Echeneis lophioides A. H. A. Duméril, 1858; Echeneis lophioides Guichenot, 1863

= White suckerfish =

Species of fish

The white suckerfish or mantasucker (Remora albescens) is a species of remora in the family Echeneidae, a group of elongated marine fish with adhesive discs for attaching to larger organisms. They are known for their large lips and white color. The distribution of this species is worldwide in warm open seas: it is found in the western Indian Ocean including Réunion and Mauritius, in the eastern Pacific Ocean from San Francisco to Chile (but is rare north of Baja California), and in the western and eastern central Atlantic Ocean from Florida and the Gulf of Mexico to Brazil and St. Paul's Rocks.

The white suckerfish can reach 30 cm (12 in) in standard length. The adhesive disk is short and wide, the length 34-40% and the width 22-26% of the standard length, with 13-14 lamellae. The pelvic fins are placed far forward and narrowly attached to the abdomen; the dorsal, anal, and pectoral fins are short with reduced rays. The dorsal fin rays number 18-23, the anal fin rays 18–24, and the pectoral fin rays 18–21. The dentition is specialized, consisting of many large, stout canine teeth set in large patches in broad jaws. The head, body, and fins are colored light brown, light tan, or light grey to whitish. Three documented specimens from the Gulf of Mexico show considerable variation in color pattern, from uniform grey or pale bluish-white to light grey, darkening on the sides and belly and bearing numerous elongated spots. One living specimen immediately darkened in color when it was removed from sea water and lightened when it was returned.

White suckerfish are rarely found free-swimming; they are host-specific to manta rays, and enter their host's mouth and gill chamber more often than any other remora. They are also occasionally found attached to sharks, and in the Indo-Pacific region to black marlin. Unlike some other remora species, parasitic copepods comprise a negligible part of the diet of the white suckerfish, suggesting it may not have a mutualistic relationship with its host. The white suckerfish responds to a touch on its belly by forcefully erecting its pelvic fins, possibly an adaptation to avoid crushing by its host. Nothing is known about their reproduction. It is used in Chinese medicine.
