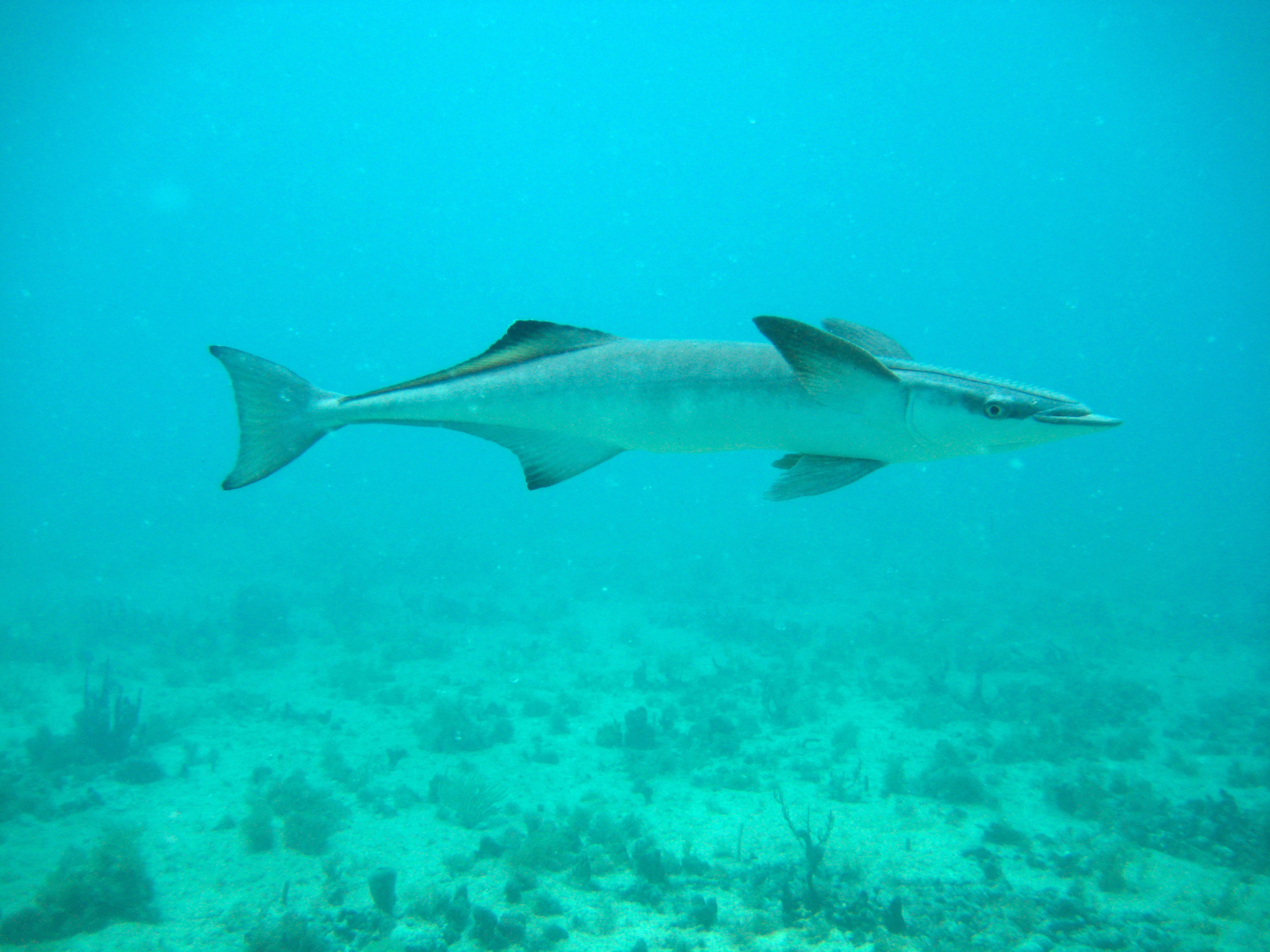
- Common remora (R. remora)

Scientific classification
- Domain: Eukaryota
- Kingdom: Animalia
- Phylum: Chordata
- Class: Actinopterygii
- Order: Carangiformes
- Suborder: Carangoidei
- Family: Echeneidae
- Genus: Remora; T. N. Gill, 1862

Type species
- Remora remora Linnaeus, 1758

Synonyms
- Pseudoremora Taranetz, 1937; Remilegia T. N. Gill, 1862; Remorina D. S. Jordan & Evermann, 1896; Remoropsis T. N. Gill, 1863; Rhombochirus T. N. Gill, 1863

= Remora (genus) =

Genus of fishes

Remora is a genus of remoras native to temperate to tropical marine waters worldwide.

== Species ==
The currently recognized species in this genus are:

Image	Scientific name	Common name	Distribution
	Remora albescens (Temminck & Schlegel, 1850)	white suckerfish	western Indian Ocean including Réunion and Mauritius, in the eastern Pacific Ocean from San Francisco to Chile (but is rare north of Baja California), and in the western and eastern central Atlantic Ocean from Florida and the Gulf of Mexico to Brazil and St. Paul's Rocks.
	Remora australis (F. D. Bennett, 1840)	whalesucker	Gulf of Mexico and western Atlantic Ocean, it occurs from Texas to Brazil, and in the eastern Pacific Ocean, it occurs from Vancouver Island to Chile.
	Remora brachyptera (R. T. Lowe, 1839)	spearfish remora	worldwide distribution in tropical and subtropical seas
	Remora osteochir (G. Cuvier, 1829)	marlin sucker	worldwide distribution in tropical and subtropical seas
	Remora remora (Linnaeus, 1758)	common remora or shark sucker	western Mediterranean and the Atlantic, as well as the North Sea
