= YIF1A =

Protein-coding gene in the species Homo sapiens

Identifiers
- Aliases: YIF1A, 54TM, FinGER7, YIF1, YIF1P, Yip1 interacting factor homolog A, membrane trafficking protein
- External IDs: OMIM: 611484; MGI: 1915340; HomoloGene: 56295; GeneCards: YIF1A; OMA:YIF1A - orthologs

Gene location (Human)
Chr.	Chromosome 11 (human)
Band	11q13.2	Start	66,284,580 bp
Band	11q13.2	End	66,289,145 bp

Gene location (Mouse)
Chr.	Chromosome 19 (mouse)
Band	19|19 A	Start	5,138,566 bp
Band	19|19 A	End	5,142,909 bp
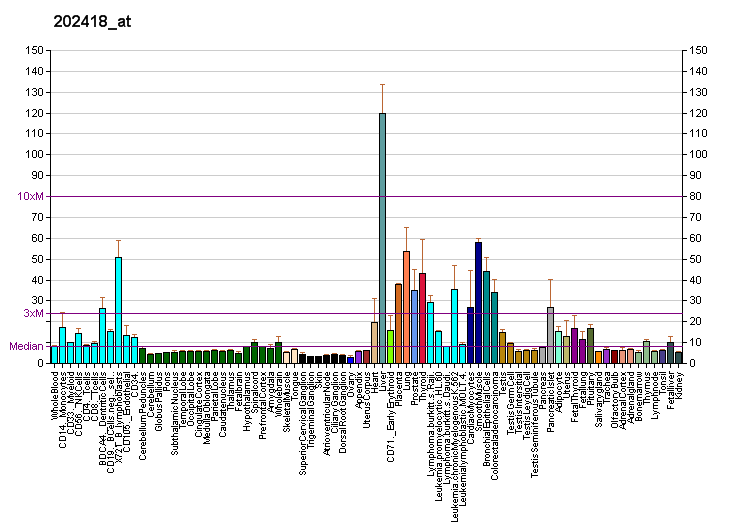
RNA expression pattern
Bgee	Human / Mouse (ortholog); Top expressed in: stromal cell of endometrium; anterior pituitary; right lobe of liver; body of pancreas; mucosa of transverse colon; left uterine tube; right lobe of thyroid gland; ascending aorta; muscle of thigh; islet of Langerhans / Top expressed in: internal carotid artery; external carotid artery; fossa; condyle; calvaria; Paneth cell; molar; endothelial cell of lymphatic vessel; right kidney; submandibular gland; More reference expression data
BioGPS	More reference expression data
Gene ontology
Molecular function	protein binding
Cellular component	endoplasmic reticulum-Golgi intermediate compartment; integral component of membrane; Golgi membrane; endoplasmic reticulum; membrane; endoplasmic reticulum membrane; Golgi apparatus; COPII-coated ER to Golgi transport vesicle; integral component of Golgi membrane
Biological process	protein transport; IRE1-mediated unfolded protein response; vesicle-mediated transport; endoplasmic reticulum to Golgi vesicle-mediated transport
Sources:Amigo / QuickGO
Orthologs
Species	Human	Mouse
Entrez	10897	68090
Ensembl	ENSG00000174851	ENSMUSG00000024875
UniProt	O95070	Q91XB7
RefSeq (mRNA)	NM_001300861; NM_020470	NM_026553
RefSeq (protein)	NP_001287790; NP_065203	NP_080829
Location (UCSC)	Chr 11: 66.28 – 66.29 Mb	Chr 19: 5.14 – 5.14 Mb
PubMed search
- Wikidata
View/Edit Human	View/Edit Mouse

Protein YIF1A is a Yip1 domain family proteins that in humans is encoded by the YIF1A gene.

== Gene ==
YIF1A (Yip1 interacting factor homolog A) is also known as YIF1, YIF1P, FinGER7, and 54TM. It has 4,591 base pairs with 8 exons, and it is located on the minus strand of chromosome 11, at 11q13.2, in humans.

=== Promoters ===
There are four predicted promoter for YIIF1A. The predicted promoter region with highest confidence is GXP_50494 and has 1252 base pairs long; it extends past the first exon of YIF1A. This promoter is located on the minus strand of chromosome 11.

=== Transcription factors ===
The promoter of YIF1A transcript variant 1 contains numerous transcription factor binding sites. Transcription factors predicted to bind to the promoter region include the following.

- Acute myeloid leukemia 1 protein, RUNX1 (runt-related transcription factor 1)
- Zinc finger protein 263, ZKSCAN12 (zinc finger protein with KRAB and SCAN domains 12)
- E2F transcription factor 1
- EGR1, early growth response 1
- GATA-binding factor 1
- Transcription factor CP2-like 1 (LBP-9)
- X-box binding protein RFX1
- Estrogen response elements (ER alpha), IR3 sites
- Lactotransferrin and deltalactoferrin, growth-inhibiting protein 12
- TGFB-inducible early growth response protein 1 (KLF10)

=== Expression ===
The expression of YIF1A is highest in the duodenum and liver. It is also expressed at moderate levels in tissues including the colon, ovary, pancreases, spleen, and esophagus, and expressed at lower levels in a variety of other tissues. NCBI GeoProfile data provide the tissue expression graph for YIF1A in humans; it also indicates that YIF1A is expressed at moderately to moderately low across all other tissues.

== mRNA ==
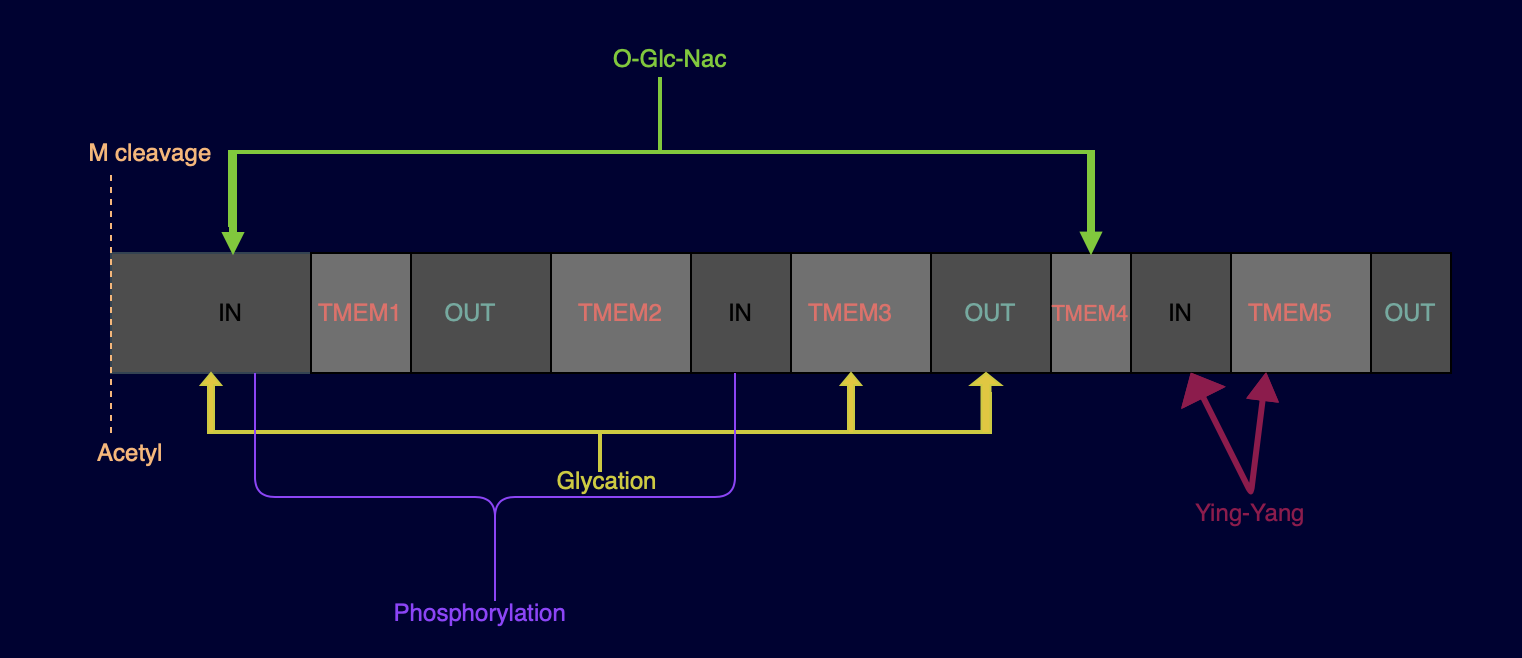
Schematic illustration of YIF1A, with domains and post-translation modifications.

YIF1A has isoforms 1 and 2, with exons 8 and 7 respectively. The two transcripts undergo alternate splicing and are translated into proteins with 293 and 241 amino acids, respectively.

=== RNA-binding proteins ===
The 5' untranslated region has predicted sites for binding by RBXM, EIF4B, and FUS. The 3' untranslated region has predicted sites for binding by ELAVL1, which is AU rich elements and regulate mRNA stability.

== Protein ==
The longest protein isoform of YIF1A is 293 amino acids in length. It has an observed molecular weight of approximately 32.0 kDa with a predicted isoelectric point of approximately 8.98.

=== Composition ===
YIF1 is a very normal protein in terms of the amino acid quantities it contains. The composition of each amino acid residue is similar to its average relative composition among human proteins. There are no charge clusters, runs, or patterns. There is a repetitive structure for protein YIF1A at [ 201- 204 and 288- 291 ] TFHL.

=== Domain and motifs ===
YIF1A has a conserved domain, pfam03878 (AA 57 →287). Within the domain, there are 5 transmembrane domains, 3 non-cytosolic domains, and 3 cytosolic domains. It has been hypothesized that there is a possible role in transport between the endoplasmic reticulum and Golgi.

=== Structure ===
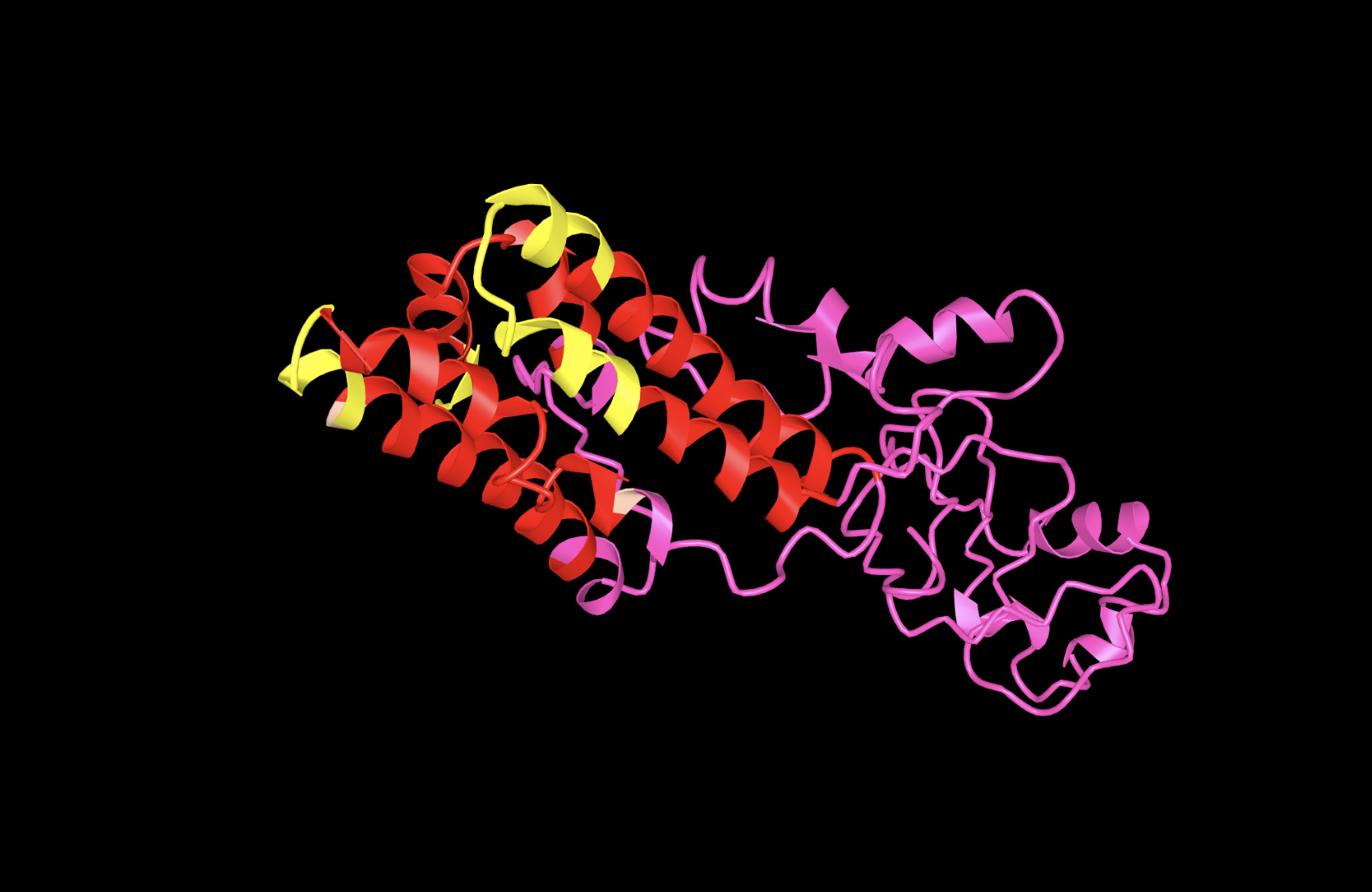
YIF1A protein structure generated by I-Tasser and visualized with iCn3D. Transmembrane domains are red, non-cytosolic domains are yellow, and cytosolic domains are deep pink.

The structure of YIF1A consist of approximately 59% alpha-helices, with TM helix and disordered regions making up the rest of the structure; no beta- strand was predicted.

=== Localization ===
YIF1A's predicted location is in the endoplasmic reticulum, with intracellular N-terminus and an extracellular C-terminus.

=== Post-translational modifications ===
YIF1A undergoes methionine cleavage and N-terminal acetylation, which is one of the most common post translation modifications of eukaryotic proteins. It also phosphorylated by unspecified kinases at several sites. Three glycation site is predicted in lysine residue(lys 104,161, and 211). YIF1A undergoes O-ß-GlcNAc modification at 5 sites, 1 of them being Yin-Yang sites.

=== Interacting protein ===
Based on fluorescence microscopy, validated two hybrid, and anti tag coimmunoprecipitation, the protein that is most likely to interact with YIF1A are GPR37, SEC23IP, REEP2, and YIPF5. Studies suggest that interaction between VAPB and YIF1A control membrane delivery into dendrites. It also participates in ER unfolded protein response (UPR) by inducing ERN1/IRE1. Additionally, the YIF1A protein interacts with the M protein of SARS-Cov-2.

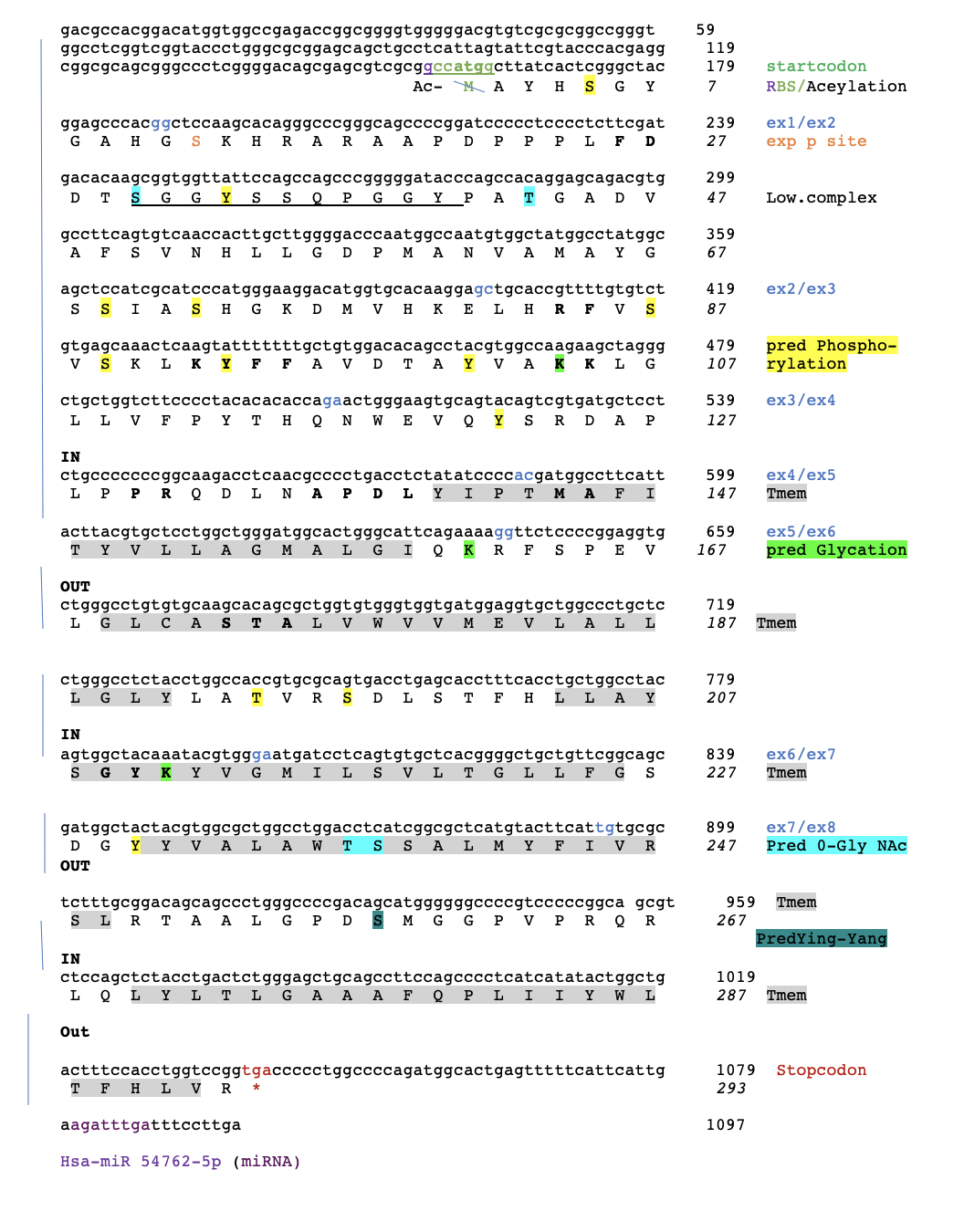
Conceptual translation of Hsa_YIF1A transcript variant 1, mRNA (NM 020470)

== Homology ==
YIF1A has a single Paralog called YIF1B, which is located on human chromosome 19. YIF1A has 238 identified orthologs. The ortholog contains vertebrates such as mammals, amphibians, and reptiles. It also has invertebrates species such as Insecta, Anthozoa, and Ascidiacea. No ortholog was found in protists, bacteria, or archaea.

The following table provides a sample of the ortholog of YIF1A.

Genus and species	Accession number	Date of Divergence (MYA)	Sequence Length(AA)	Sequence Identity
Homo sapiens (Human)	NP_065203	0	293	100
Aotus nancymaae (Ma's night monkey)	XP_012318344	43	317	94
Mus musculus (Mouse)	NP_080829	90	293	93
Sus scrofa (Wild Boar)	XP_013849519	96	311	92
Delphinapterus leucas (White whale)	XP_022447094	96	306	91
Phascolarctos cinereus (Koala)	XP_020823757	159	293	88
Ornithorhynchus anatinus(Platypus)	XP_028915982	177	293	88
Chelonia mydas(Green turtle)	XP_007056281	312	240	78
Chrysemys picta bellii(Painted turtle)	XP_005305497	312	293	73
Microcaecilia unicolor(Amph.)	XP_029470520	352	306	72
Rhinatrema bivittatum(Two-lined caecilian)	XP_029470520	352	307	71
Latimeria chalumnae (Gombessa)	XP_014345204	413	296	71
Salmo trutta (Brown trou)	XP_029585843	435	309	70
Echeneis naucrates (live sharksucker)	XP_029368074	435	308	66
Danio rerio (Zebrafish)	NP_956225	435	307	65
Maylandia zebra (zebra mbuna)	XP_004545672	435	308	63
Saccharomyces cerevisiae S288C (Baker's yeast)	NP_014136	1017	314	33
Physcomitrium patens (moss)	XP_024362517	1275	282	30
