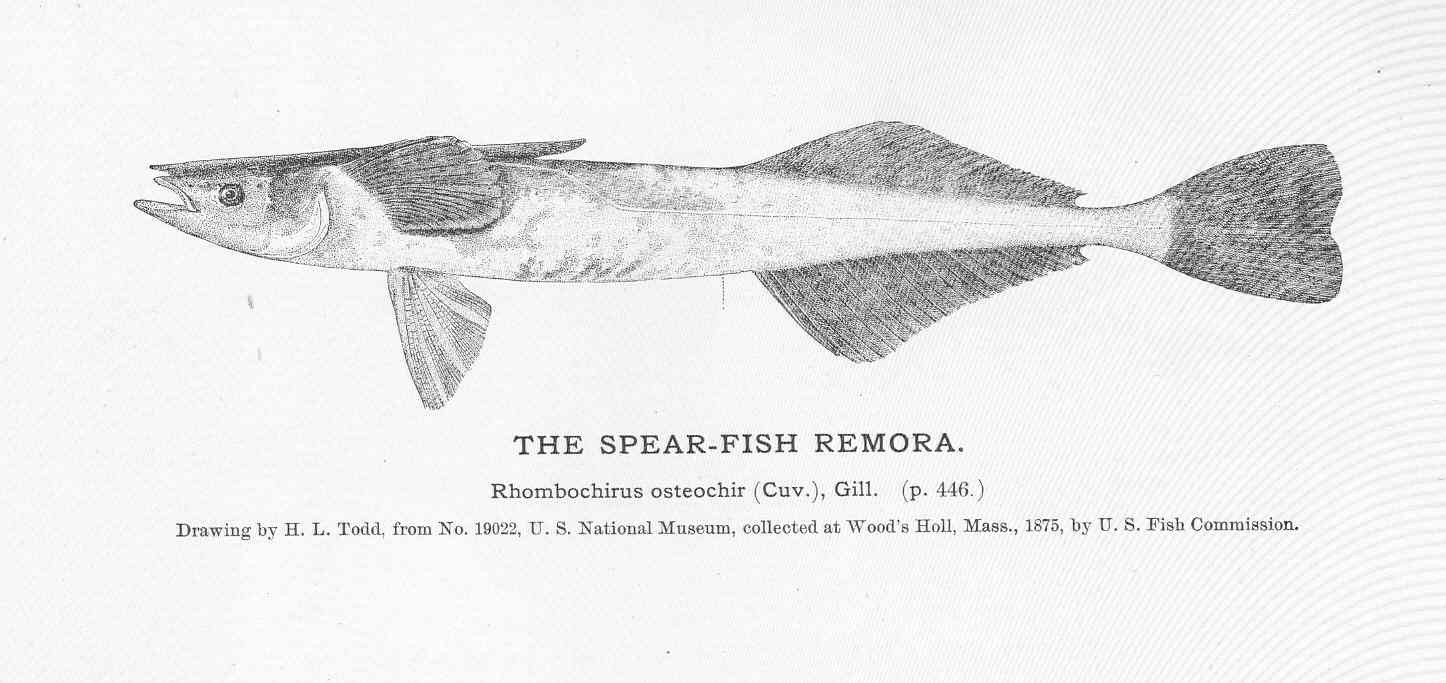

Conservation status
- Least Concern (IUCN 3.1)

Scientific classification
- Kingdom: Animalia
- Phylum: Chordata
- Class: Actinopterygii
- Order: Carangiformes
- Suborder: Carangoidei
- Family: Echeneidae
- Genus: Remora
- Species: R. osteochir

Binomial name
- Remora osteochir (G. Cuvier, 1829)

Synonyms
- Echeneis brachyptera Lowe, 1839; Remoropsis brachyptera (Lowe, 1839); Echeneis sexdecimlamellata Eydoux & Gervais, 1837; Echeneis quatuordecimlaminatus Storer, 1839; Echeneis pallida Temminck & Schlegel, 1850; Echeneis nieuhofii Bleeker, 1853

= Marlin sucker =

Species of fish

The marlin sucker or spear-fish remora (Remora osteochir) is a species of remora found all over the world in tropical and temperate seas. It can reach up to 40 cm (16 in) in standard length. It normally lives attached to a larger fish; its host preference is for marlins (as the name implies) and sailfishes, but it will attach to other large fish.

== Description ==
Compared to other species of remora, Remora osteochir is sturdy with a small mouth, stiff, rounded pectoral fins and wide-base pelvic fins. It can grow to a maximum length of about 40 cm (16 in). As is the case with other remoras, the front dorsal fin has been replaced by a suction disc, the length of which is 37 to 49% of the standard length of the fish. The disc has 15 to 19 laminae. Both the dorsal and anal fins are relatively short; the dorsal fin has 20 to 26 soft rays, the anal fin has 20 to 25 and the pectoral fins have 20 to 24 soft rays. The dorsal colouring is dark grey to black and the ventral surface is rather paler. Apart from the tips of the outer rays of the caudal fin, which are grey, the fins are black in adults, but transparent or pale grey in juveniles.

== Distribution ==
R. osteochir is found in warm temperate and subtropical seas around the world, between about 42°N and 45°S. Its depth range is down to about 200 m (660 ft), but in reality, it goes where its host takes it.

== Ecology ==
This species is normally found attached by its disc to the surface of a marlin or sailfish, but sometimes it attaches to another large fish. It attaches to the body or gill chamber, and a pair of the remoras is often present on one host fish. There is often a male fish under one operculum and a female under the other. The laminae, out of which the disc is formed, are covered with bristles which lie flat, and these provide the suction grip. The remora can detach from its host by moving forwards and reattach by moving backwards. Remoras do not harm their host but may feed on any ectoparasites, flakes of skin and stray food particles that come their way as well as consuming the fish faeces. Parasitic copepods form an important part of this remora's diet.
