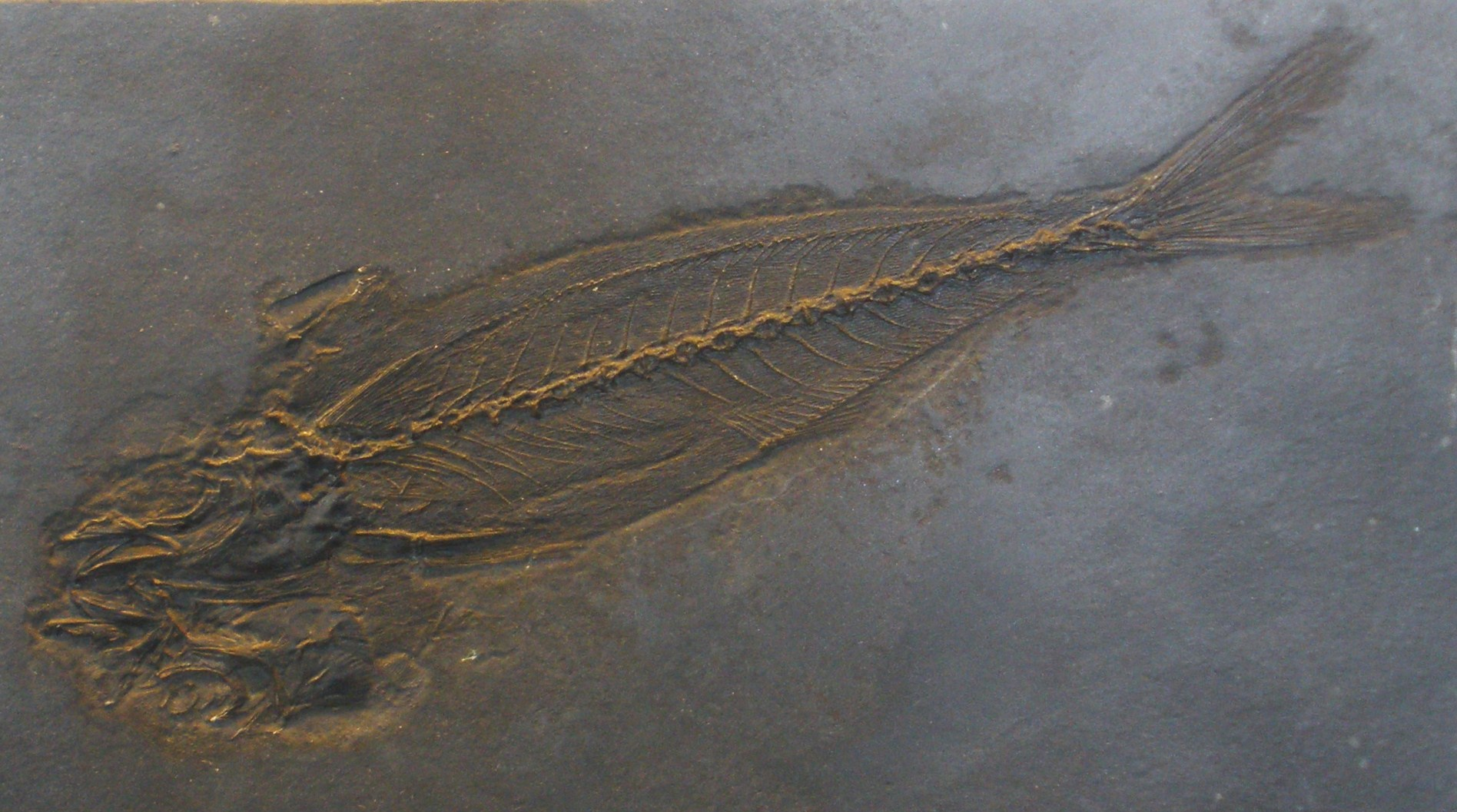
- Fossil specimen, Paleontology Museum of Zurich

Scientific classification
- Kingdom: Animalia
- Phylum: Chordata
- Class: Actinopterygii
- Order: Carangiformes
- Suborder: Carangoidei
- Superfamily: Echeneoidea
- Family: †Opisthomyzonidae; Berg, 1940
- Genus: †Opisthomyzon; Cope, 1889
- Species: †O. glaronensis

Binomial name
- †Opisthomyzon glaronensis (Wettstein, 1886)

Synonyms
- †Uropteryx elongatus Agassiz, 1835 (name only); †Echeneis glaronensis Wettstein, 1886

= Opisthomyzon =

Opisthomyzon Temporal range: Early Oligocene

Extinct genus of fishes

Opisthomyzon is an extinct genus of stem group-remora that lived during the Oligocene epoch. It contains a single species, O. glaronensis, from the Early Oligocene-aged Matt Formation of Switzerland. It is the only member of the family Opisthomyzonidae.

It is the oldest known remora-like fish known from the fossil record, providing important evidence about the evolution of this family and its distinctive morphological features. It had already developed the iconic adhesive disk, further affirming its close relationship to extant remoras, but is presently retained in its own family due to its distinctive morphological features from them. For example, the adhesive disk was in a postcranial position extending onto the back, rather than directly on the head as with modern remoras.

The specimen was originally named as Uropteryx elongatus by Agassiz (1835). However, this name was done without a proper description and is thus a nomen nudum. Wettstein (1886) described it among the extant remoras as Echeneis glaronensis, but Cope (1889) placed it in its own genus, Opisthomyzon. Friedman & Johanson (2012) erroneously revived U. elongatus for the genus, but Friedman et al (2013) reversed this decision after noting the former name's status as a nomen nudum.

== See also ==
- Prehistoric fish
- List of prehistoric bony fish
