= Echeneis =

Greek legendary creature

An echeneis (Ancient Greek: ἐχενηΐς) is a legendary creature. It is a described as a small fish that was said to latch on to ships, holding them back.

== Mythology ==
Pliny the Elder (1st century AD) also said of the echeneis: "It has a disgraceful repute, as being employed in love philtres, and for the purpose of retarding judgments and legal proceedings—evil properties, which are only compensated by a single merit that it possesses—it is good for staying fluxes of the womb in pregnant women, and preserves the fœtus up to birth: it is never used, however, for food." In his Quaestiones Convivales, Plutarch gives a detailed description of the creature.

They were said to be found in the Indian Ocean.

Isidore of Seville (7th century AD) and Bartholomaeus Anglicus (13th century) are among later authors of bestiaries that mention the echeneis.

It is thought that these ancient descriptions refer to the remora.

== See also ==
- Remora#In_human_culture
