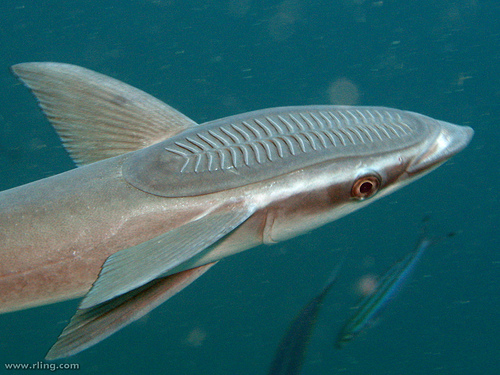
- E. naucrates, showing suction disc

Scientific classification
- Kingdom: Animalia
- Phylum: Chordata
- Class: Actinopterygii
- Division: Teleostei
- Order: Carangiformes
- Suborder: Carangoidei
- Family: Echeneidae
- Genus: Echeneis; Linnaeus, 1758

Type species
- Leptecheneis lunata Linnaeus, 1758

Synonyms
- Leptecheneis Gill, 1864

= Echeneis (fish) =

Echeneis Temporal range: Miocene – Recent

Genus of fishes

Echeneis is a genus of fish in the family Echeneidae, the remoras. The genus is distributed in the Atlantic, Pacific and Indian Oceans.

The generic name Echeneis comes from the Greek echein meaning "to hold" and naus meaning "ship", a reference to the ability of these fish to attach themselves to the hulls of vessels and, in legend, to slow them down.

== Species ==
The currently recognized species in this genus are:

- Echeneis naucrates Linnaeus, 1758 – live sharksucker
- Echeneis neucratoides Zuiew, 1789 – whitefin sharksucker

== Fossil species ==
- †Echeneis urupensis Daniltshenko, 1958 (Miocene of Russia)
