= OR10A4 =

Protein-coding gene in the species Homo sapiens

Identifiers
- Aliases: OR10A4, JCG5, OR10A4P, olfactory receptor family 10 subfamily A member 4
- External IDs: MGI: 109148; GeneCards: OR10A4

Gene location (Human)
Chr.	Chromosome 11 (human)
Band	11p15.4	Start	6,876,625 bp
Band	11p15.4	End	6,877,619 bp

Gene location (Mouse)
Chr.	Chromosome 7 (mouse)
Band	7|7 E3	Start	106,692,427 bp
Band	7|7 E3	End	106,699,015 bp
RNA expression pattern
Bgee	Human / Mouse (ortholog); Top expressed in: testicle; bone marrow cell; corpus callosum; placenta / Top expressed in: respiratory epithelium; nasal epithelium; olfactory epithelium; gastrula; More reference expression data
BioGPS	n/a
Gene ontology
Molecular function	G protein-coupled receptor activity; olfactory receptor activity; signal transducer activity
Cellular component	integral component of membrane; plasma membrane; membrane
Biological process	sensory perception of smell; signal transduction; response to stimulus; detection of chemical stimulus involved in sensory perception of smell; axon guidance; G protein-coupled receptor signaling pathway
Sources:Amigo / QuickGO
Orthologs
Databases	NCBI: entry; OMA: entry
Species	Human	Mouse
Entrez	283297	18314
Ensembl	ENSG00000170782	ENSMUSG00000073897
UniProt	Q9H209	Q7TRM9
RefSeq (mRNA)	NM_207186	NM_020598
RefSeq (protein)	NP_997069	NP_065623
Location (UCSC)	Chr 11: 6.88 – 6.88 Mb	Chr 7: 106.69 – 106.7 Mb
PubMed search
- Wikidata
View/Edit Human	View/Edit Mouse

Olfactory receptor 10A4 is a protein that in humans is encoded by the OR10A4 gene.

Olfactory receptors interact with odorant molecules in the nose, to initiate a neuronal response that triggers the perception of a smell. The olfactory receptor proteins are members of a large family of G-protein-coupled receptors (GPCR) arising from single coding-exon genes. Olfactory receptors share a 7-transmembrane domain structure with many neurotransmitter and hormone receptors and are responsible for the recognition and G protein-mediated transduction of odorant signals. The olfactory receptor gene family is the largest in the genome. The nomenclature assigned to the olfactory receptor genes and proteins for this organism is independent of other organisms.

== See also ==
- Olfactory receptor
