= TJAP1 =

Protein-coding gene in the species Homo sapiens

Identifiers
- Aliases: TJAP1, PILT, TJP4, tight junction associated protein 1
- External IDs: OMIM: 612658; MGI: 1921344; HomoloGene: 12534; GeneCards: TJAP1; OMA:TJAP1 - orthologs

Gene location (Human)
| Chr. | Chromosome 6 (human) |
| Band | 6p21.1 | Start | 43,477,523 bp |
| Band | 6p21.1 | End | 43,506,556 bp |

Gene location (Mouse)
| Chr. | Chromosome 17 (mouse) |
| Band | 17|17 C | Start | 46,568,777 bp |
| Band | 17|17 C | End | 46,593,952 bp |
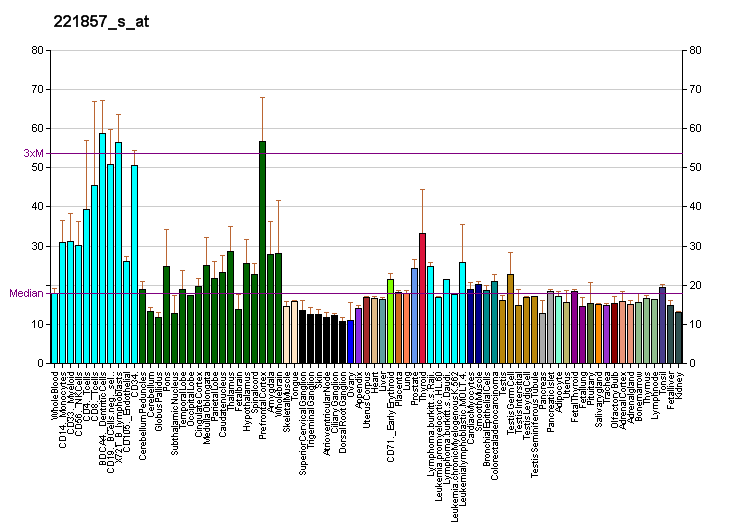

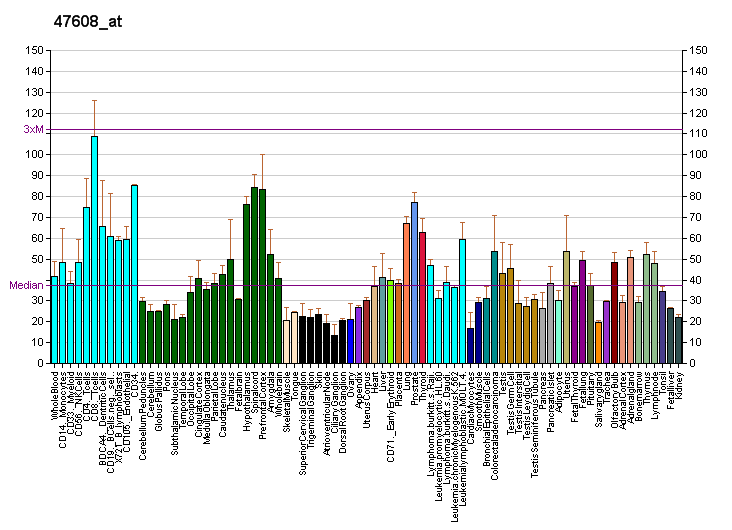
RNA expression pattern
| Bgee | Human / Mouse (ortholog); Top expressed in: secondary oocyte; sural nerve; C1 segment; inferior ganglion of vagus nerve; optic nerve; inferior olivary nucleus; left ovary; gastrocnemius muscle; right ovary; body of uterus / Top expressed in: muscle of thigh; ventricular zone; neural layer of retina; lip; vestibular sensory epithelium; zygote; gastrula; yolk sac; primary visual cortex; epiblast; More reference expression data |
| BioGPS | More reference expression data |
Gene ontology
| Molecular function | protein binding |
| Cellular component | cytoplasm; cell junction; endosome; trans-Golgi network; plasma membrane; bicellular tight junction; Golgi apparatus |
| Biological process | Golgi organization |
Sources:Amigo / QuickGO
Orthologs
| Species | Human | Mouse |
| Entrez | 93643 | 74094 |
| Ensembl | ENSG00000137221 | ENSMUSG00000012296 |
| UniProt | Q5JTD0 | Q9DCD5 |
| RefSeq (mRNA) | NM_001146016; NM_001146017; NM_001146018; NM_001146019; NM_001146020 NM_080604; NM_001350561; NM_001350562; NM_001350563; NM_001350564; NM_001350565; NM_001350566; NM_001350567; NM_001350568; NM_001350569; NM_001350570; NM_001394538; NM_001394539; NM_001394540; NM_001394541; NM_001394542; NM_001394543; NM_001394544; NM_001394545 | NM_001252473; NM_001252474; NM_001252475; NM_028751 |
| RefSeq (protein) | NP_001139488; NP_001139489; NP_001139490; NP_001139491; NP_001139492 NP_542171; NP_001337490; NP_001337491; NP_001337492; NP_001337493; NP_001337494; NP_001337495; NP_001337496; NP_001337497; NP_001337498; NP_001337499 | NP_001239402; NP_001239403; NP_001239404; NP_083027 |
| Location (UCSC) | Chr 6: 43.48 – 43.51 Mb | Chr 17: 46.57 – 46.59 Mb |
| PubMed search |
- Wikidata
| View/Edit Human | View/Edit Mouse |

Tight junction-associated protein 1 is a protein that in humans is encoded by the TJAP1 gene.

== Interactions ==
TJAP1 has been shown to interact with DLG1.
