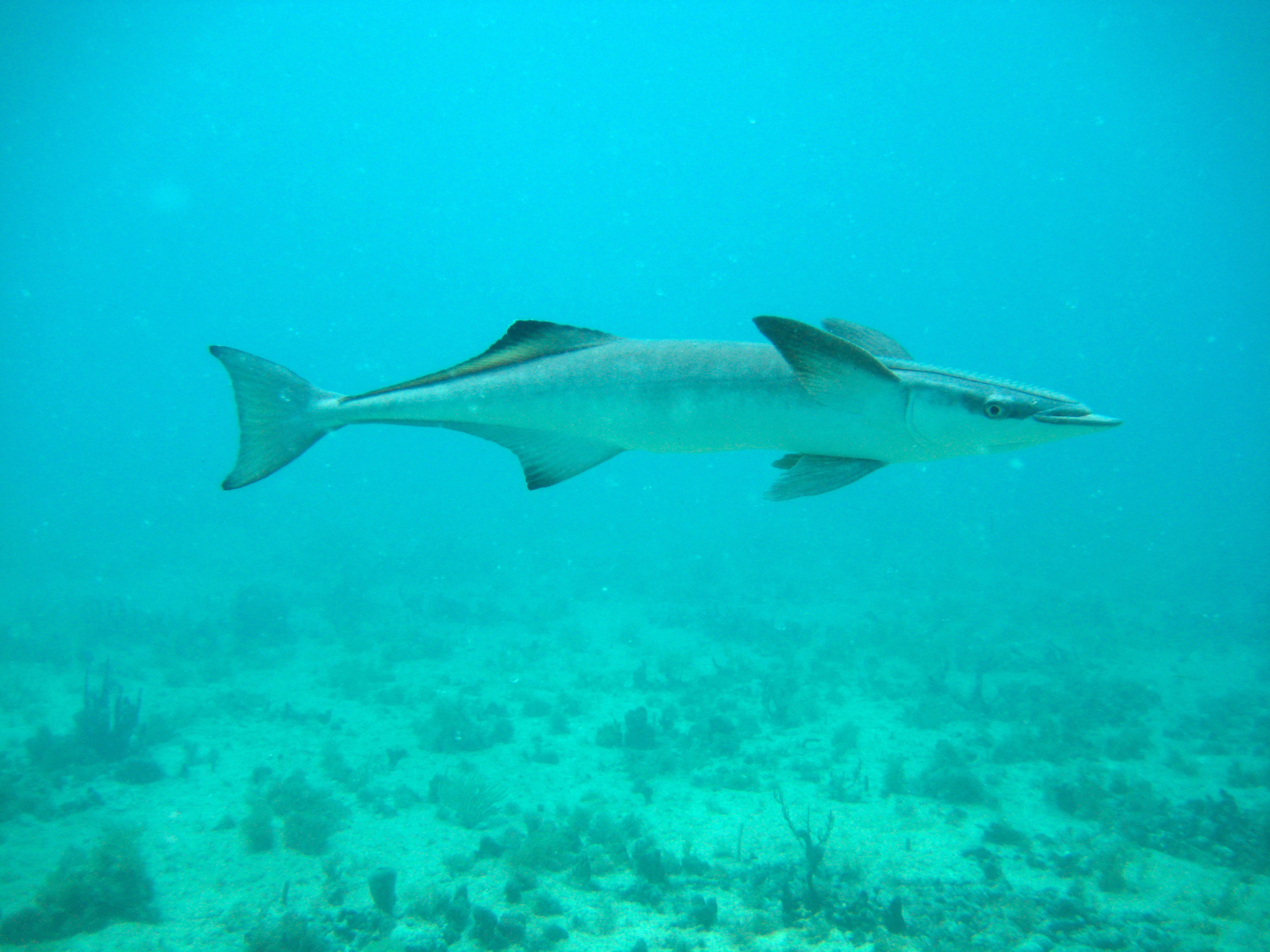

Conservation status
- Least Concern (IUCN 3.1)

Scientific classification
- Kingdom: Animalia
- Phylum: Chordata
- Class: Actinopterygii
- Division: Teleostei
- Order: Carangiformes
- Suborder: Carangoidei
- Family: Echeneidae
- Genus: Remora
- Species: R. remora

Binomial name
- Remora remora (Linnaeus, 1758)

Synonyms
- Echeneis remora Linnaeus, 1758; Echeneis squalipeta Daldorff, 1793; Echeneis parva Gronow, 1854; Echeneis remoroides Bleeker, 1855; Echeneis remeligo Duméril, 1858; Echeneis bourboniensis Duméril, 1858; Echeneis postica Poey, 1860; Echeneis remeligo Guichenot, 1863; Echeneis borboniensis Guichenot, 1863; Echeneis nubifera Tanaka, 1915

= Common remora =

Species of fish

The common remora (Remora remora) is a pelagic marine fish belonging to the family Echeneidae. The dorsal fin, which has 22 to 26 soft rays, acts as a suction cup, creating a vacuum to allow the fish to attach to larger marine animals, such as whales, dolphins, sharks, and sea turtles.

== Physical characteristics ==
The common remora has a suckerlike dorsal fin and an anal fin. Its body can be brown, black or grey in color. It can reach 86.4 cm (34.0 in) in total length, though most do not exceed 40 cm (16 in). The maximum known weight of this species is 1.1 kg (2.4 lb).

== Biology and behavior ==
R. remora and its host seem to partake in a symbiotic relationship; the common remora does not seem to have a negative overall effect on its host. The host provides the remora with fast-moving water for respiration, a steady flow of food, transportation, and protection. The remora benefits the host by feeding in part on some of its parasites, but increases its hydrodynamic drag. The common remora's attachment to one host can last for up to three months. During this time, the remora can move its attachment site if it feels threatened. The common remora cannot survive in still water; it needs water flow over its gills to breathe.

== Habitat ==
This remora is commonly found in warm marine waters and has been seen in the western Mediterranean and the Atlantic, as well as the North Sea.

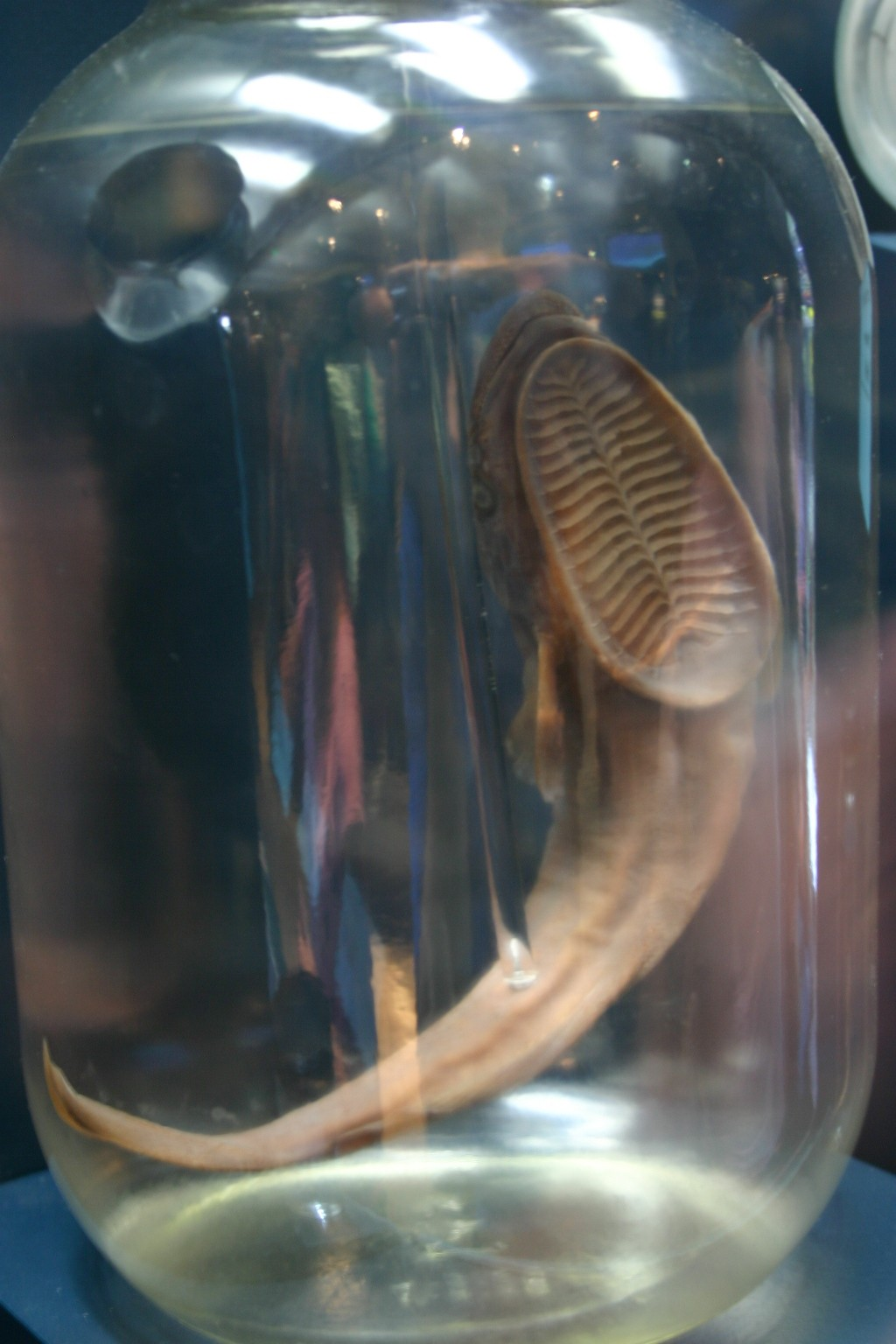
Museum specimen, dorsal view

== Reproduction ==
A mating couple may attach to the same host, and have host fidelity. It is not clear when during the year the common remora spawns, and little is known about the fish's reproductive behavior.

== Food and diet ==
The remora consumes food scraps from its host, as well as plankton and parasitic copepods.

== Significance to humans ==
No known negative impacts for humans are known. Remoras are occasionally caught as fishing bycatch and put in aquaria. Remoras have been used in fishing – one method involves tying fishing line to the remora, then waiting for it to cling to a larger fish.

Other common names for this familiar fish include suck fish, stout sucking fish, common sucker, shark-sucker, brown sucker, and shark pilot.
