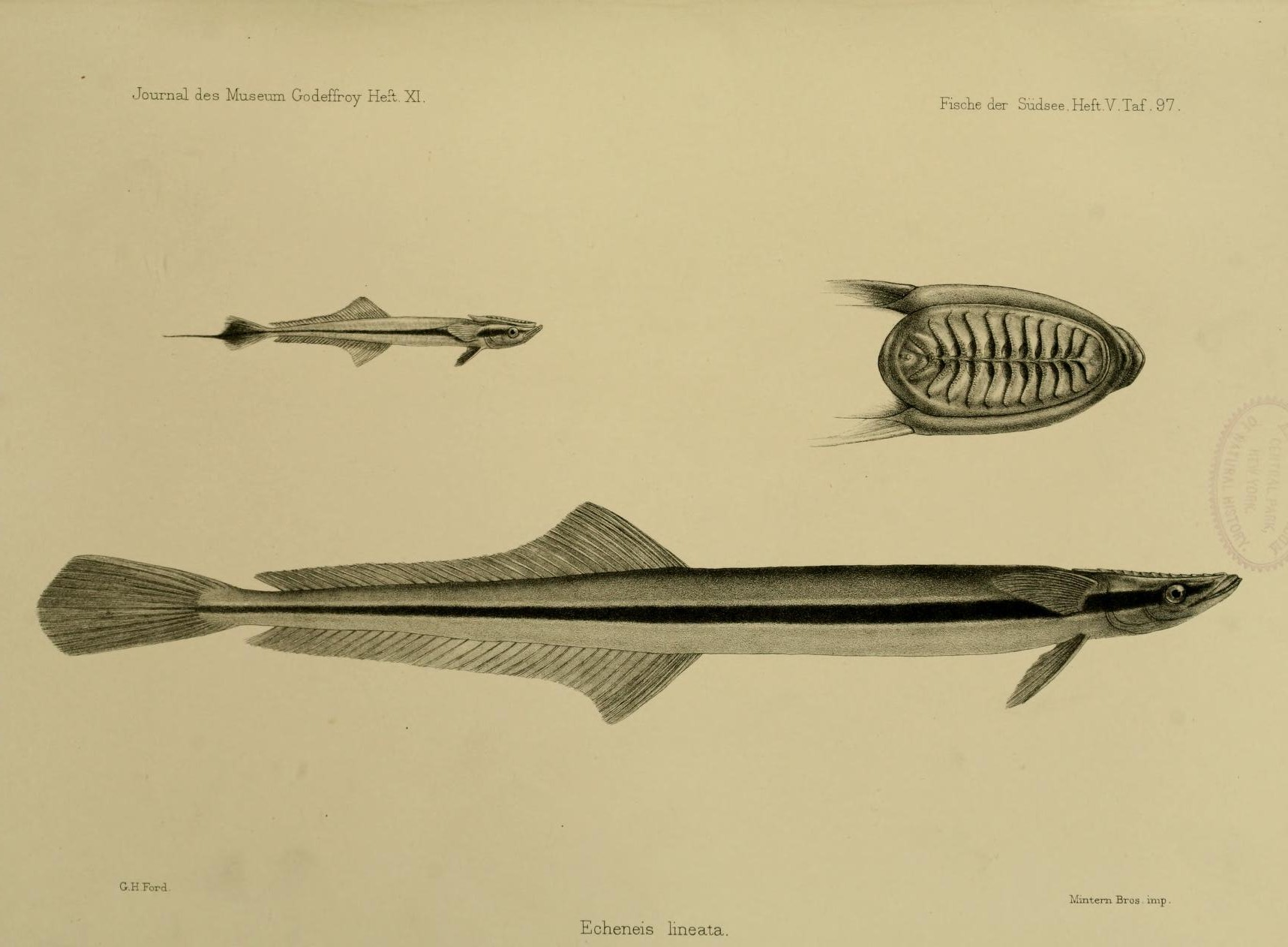

Conservation status
- Least Concern (IUCN 3.1)

Scientific classification
- Kingdom: Animalia
- Phylum: Chordata
- Class: Actinopterygii
- Order: Carangiformes
- Suborder: Carangoidei
- Family: Echeneidae
- Genus: Phtheirichthys; Gill, 1862
- Species: P. lineatus

Binomial name
- Phtheirichthys lineatus (Menzies, 1791)

Synonyms
- Echeneis lineata Menzies, 1791; Echeneis tropica Euphrasén, 1791; Echeneis apicalis Poey, 1860; Echeneis sphyraenarum Poey, 1860; Phtheirichthys multiradiatus L. P. Schultz, 1943

= Slender suckerfish =

Species of fish

The slender suckerfish or lousefish (Phtheirichthys lineatus) is a rare species of remora found around the world in tropical and subtropical seas, in areas like the Atlantic, Pacific, and Indian Ocean, from depths from 1 to 100 meters deep.

The body of the slender suckerfish is elongated, with long dorsal and anal fins. The dorsal fin rays number 29-33, the anal fin rays 29-34, and the pectoral fin rays 18-21. The adhesive disk atop the head is small, length 18-28% of the standard length, with 9-11 lamellae. The caudal fin is paddle-shaped. The head and body are pale, dark brown, or blackish. Larger specimens have a distinctive dark brown stripe running along the side of the body, bordered by narrower white stripes above and below. The fins are blackish, with the outer portions of the longer dorsal and anal fin rays and the margins of the outer caudal fin rays light. It usually reaches 34 cm (13 in) in total length (TL), but has been reported up to 76 cm (30 in) TL. The sucker disk is fully developed in 50-mm individuals.

With the smallest adhesive disk amongst the remoras, the slender suckerfish is not strongly host-dependent and can be encountered free-swimming or attached to inanimate objects. The slender suckerfish feeds mostly on scraps of fish and plankton, as opposed to more host-dependent remoras that feed on host parasites. Nothing is known of its reproduction.
