= Yip1 domain family =

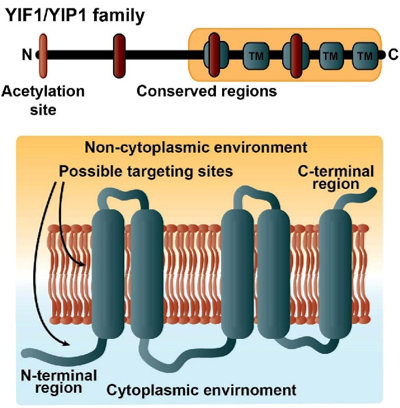
Architecture of Yip1 domain family proteins

The Yip1 domain family is a group of proteins involved in regulating secretory traffic in eukaryotes. The family consists of four members in yeast and nine members in humans. Family members have a shared architecture containing five transmembrane domains.

== Evolution ==
Yip1 domain family members are found in all eukaryotes. The budding yeast Saccharomyces cerevisiae has four Yip1 domain family members: Yif1p, Yip1p, Yip4p, and Yip5p. The amino acid sequence of the Yip domain family members divides them into two groups, called α-subunits and β-subunits. The α-subunits – in yeast Yip1p and Yip4p – are more closely related to each other than they are to the β-subunits, Yip5p and Yif1p. In mammals, both groups are expanded, with α-subunits YipF4, YipF5, YipF6, and YipF7; as well as β-subunits Yif1A, Yif1B, YipF1, YipF2, and YipF3.

== Function ==
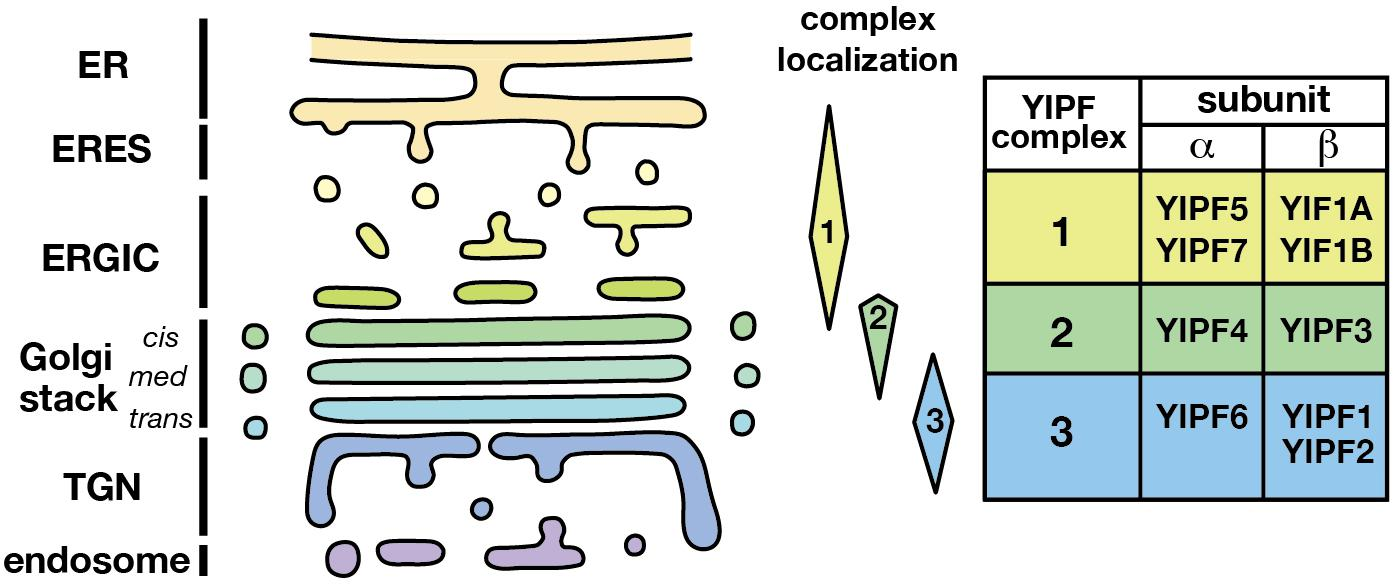
Localization of Yip1 domain family members

Yip1 domain family members localize to the Golgi apparatus, where they interact with each other to form complexes involved in trafficking cargo within the Golgi, and/or between the endoplasmic reticulum and Golgi. The Yip1 domain family members are widely distributed throughout the body – with the exception of YipF7 found primarily in the skeletal muscle and tongue, while YipF1A is predominantly in the liver. Within the cell, the different Yip family members have slightly different localizations, with YipF5, YipF7, Yif1A, and Yif1B (in yeast Yip1p and Yif1p) at the margin of the endoplasmic reticulum and Golgi; YipF3 and YipF4 at the cis-Golgi; and YipF1, YipF2, and Yipf6 (in yeast Yip4p and Yip5p) at the trans-Golgi.

YipF1 was conditionally knocked-out in mice with no observable effect.

A non-functional version of YipF6 exacerbated intestinal inflammation in mice, and sometimes resulted in spontaneous intestinal inflammatory disease.

=== YipF2 protein ===
The Golgi protein YipF2 plays a critical role in maintaining the stability of the genome. Depletion of YipF2 hinders homologous recombinational repair of DNA, thus indicating that an intact Golgi apparatus containing YipF2 likely plays a role in maintaining genome integrity and in promoting a healthy lifespan.

== Structure ==
Each Yip1 domain family protein contains five transmembrane domains, with the N-terminus exposed to the cytosol and the C-terminus to the Golgi apparatus lumen. Yip1 domain family members are thought to interact with a partner, with two molecules of each partner forming an active tetramer complex with 20 transmembrane segments.
