= Frederick Debell Bennett =

English ship surgeon and biologist

Frederick Debell Bennett (1806–1859) was an English ship surgeon and biologist.

Born to a family of means in Devon, England, in 1806, he obtained his Licentiate of the Society of Apothecaries (L.S.A.) in 1828, and his membership of the Royal College of Surgeons in 1829. Bennett first served as Assistant Surgeon on the hospital ship Grampus, which was moored on the River Thames.

Then in 1833 Bennett joined the London whaleship Tuscan. From 1833 to 1836 he sailed round the globe on board the 'Tuscan'. The task of this journey was to study whales, lands and nature. He described several species, including the whalesucker (Remora australis), the blue noddy and Cheilopogon nigricans. He was also a member of the Royal Geographical Society. After his return he practiced medicine in Southwark in London where he died in 1859 at the age of fifty-three.

== Book ==
- Narrative of a Whaling Voyage Round the Globe, From the Year 1833 to 1836 (London, 1840)
