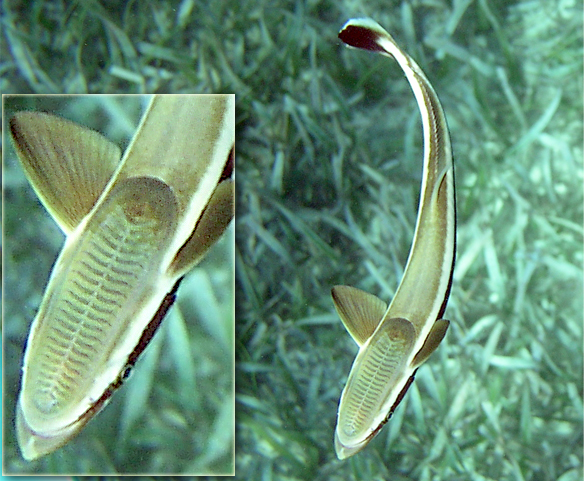

Conservation status
- Least Concern (IUCN 3.1)

Scientific classification
- Kingdom: Animalia
- Phylum: Chordata
- Class: Actinopterygii
- Division: Teleostei
- Order: Carangiformes
- Suborder: Carangoidei
- Family: Echeneidae
- Genus: Echeneis
- Species: E. naucrates

Binomial name
- Echeneis naucrates Linnaeus, 1758

Synonyms
- Leptecheneis naucrates (Linnaeus, 1758); Echeneis lunata Bancroft, 1831; Echeneis vittata Rüppell, 1838; Echeneis fasciata Gronow, 1854; Echeneis fusca Gronow, 1854; Echeneis chiromacer Duméril, 1858; Echeneis scaphecrates Duméril, 1858; Echeneis guaican Poey, 1860; Echeneis metallica Poey, 1860; Leptecheneis flaviventris Seale, 1906

= Live sharksucker =

Species of fish

The live sharksucker or slender sharksucker (Echeneis naucrates) is a species of marine fish in the family Echeneidae, the remoras.

== Distribution and habitat ==
The species is considered circumtropical, as it occurs in all tropical and warm temperate waters around the world except for the eastern Pacific. The species can be found close to the coast, as well as offshore at a maximum depth of 50 m (160 ft).

Sharksuckers are known to temporarily attach themselves to various objects or hosts by using their modified dorsal fins. Hosts include sharks, rays, large bony fishes, sea turtles, whales, dolphins, ships, and even scuba divers.

== Description ==
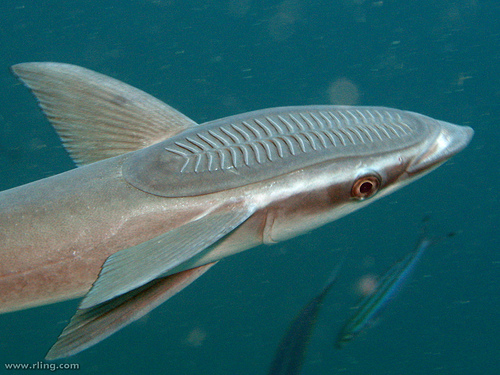
Echeneis naucrates

E. naucrates is a medium-sized fish which can grow up to 110 cm (43 in) length. Its body is elongated and streamlined, and its lower jaw is clearly prognathic (it projects forward well beyond the upper jaw). The jaws, vomer and tongue have villiform teeth. The main distinctive feature to distinguish from other fishes is the oval-shaped sucking disc, which is a highly modified dorsal fin positioned from the top of the head to the anterior part of the body.

The body background colouration is dark grey to dark brown, with a dark belly. A longitudinal stripe runs along the axis side of the body, it is always darker than its background colour with a whitish margin. The caudal fin is black with white corners.

== Diet ==
The remora's diet varies according to its maturity or situation (with host or not).

As a juvenile, it sometimes acts as a cleaner fish on a reef station; its diet consists of small parasitic crustaceans such as copepods, isopods, and ostracods.

When attached to a host, the remora eats parasitic crustaceans, food scraps from its host's feeding activity, and even some small food (like plankton) captured by filtering water through its villiform teeth.

Without a host, the fish stays close to the shore and can aggregate with other individuals; its diet is then composed of free-living crustaceans, squid, and small fish.
