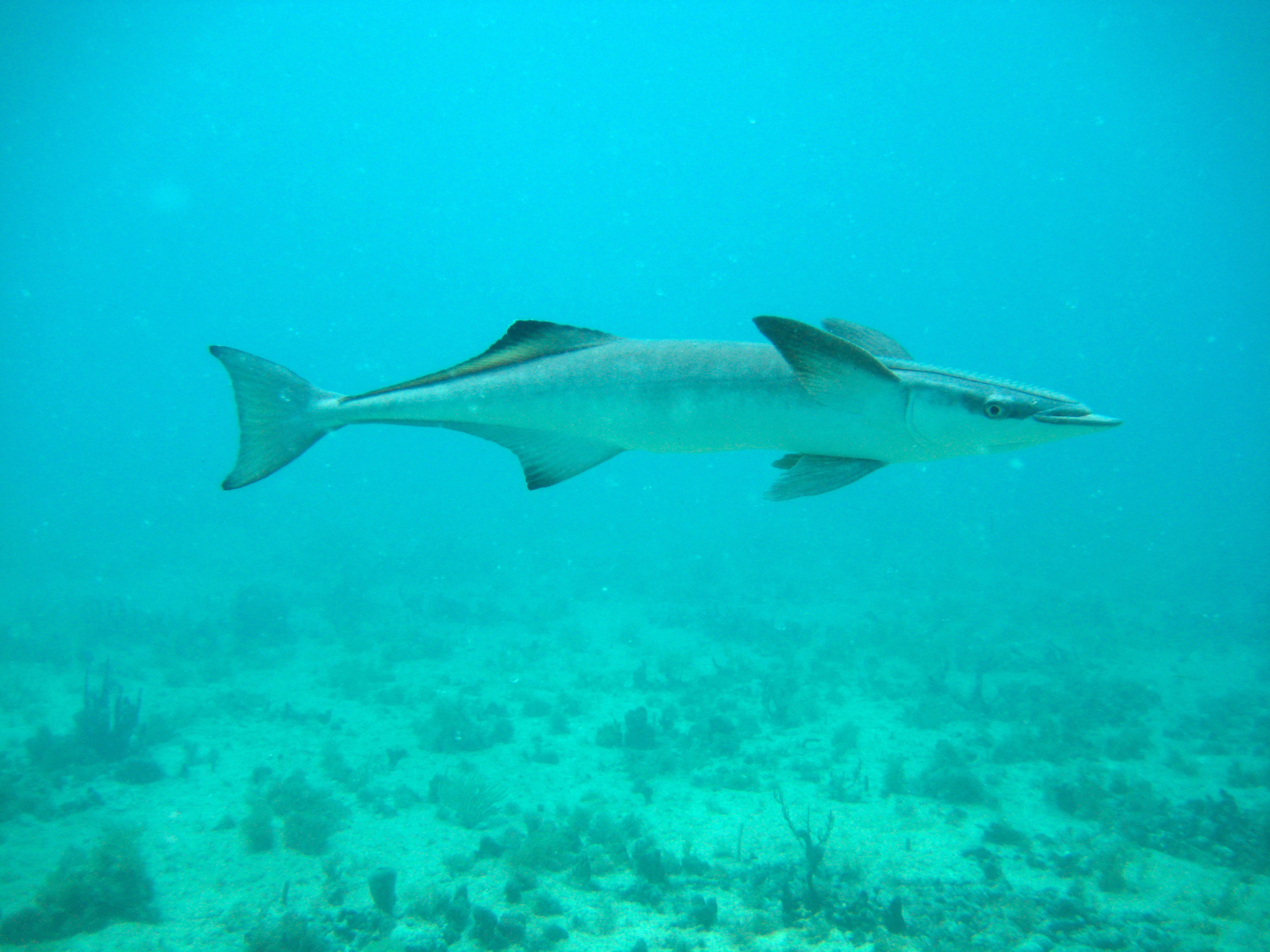
- Common remora, Remora remora

Scientific classification
- Kingdom: Animalia
- Phylum: Chordata
- Class: Actinopterygii
- Division: Teleostei
- Order: Carangiformes
- Suborder: Carangoidei
- Superfamily: Echeneoidea
- Family: Echeneidae; Rafinesque, 1810

Genera
- Echeneis Linnaeus, 1758; Phtheirichthys Gill, 1862; Remora Gill, 1862

Synonyms
- Echeneididae

= Remora =

Remora Temporal range: Early Oligocene – Recent

Family (Echeneidae) of ray-finned fish

The remora (/ˈrɛmərə/), sometimes called suckerfish or sharksucker, is any of a family (Echeneidae) of ray-finned fish in the order Carangiformes. Depending on species, they grow to 30–110 cm (12–43 in) long. Their distinctive first dorsal fins take the form of a modified oval, sucker-like organ with slat-like structures that open and close to create suction and take a firm hold against the skin of larger marine animals. The disk is made up of stout, flexible membranes that can be raised and lowered to generate suction. By sliding backward, the remora can increase the suction, or it can release itself by swimming forward. Remoras sometimes attach to small boats, and have been observed attaching to divers as well. They swim well on their own, with a sinuous, or curved, motion.

== Evolution ==
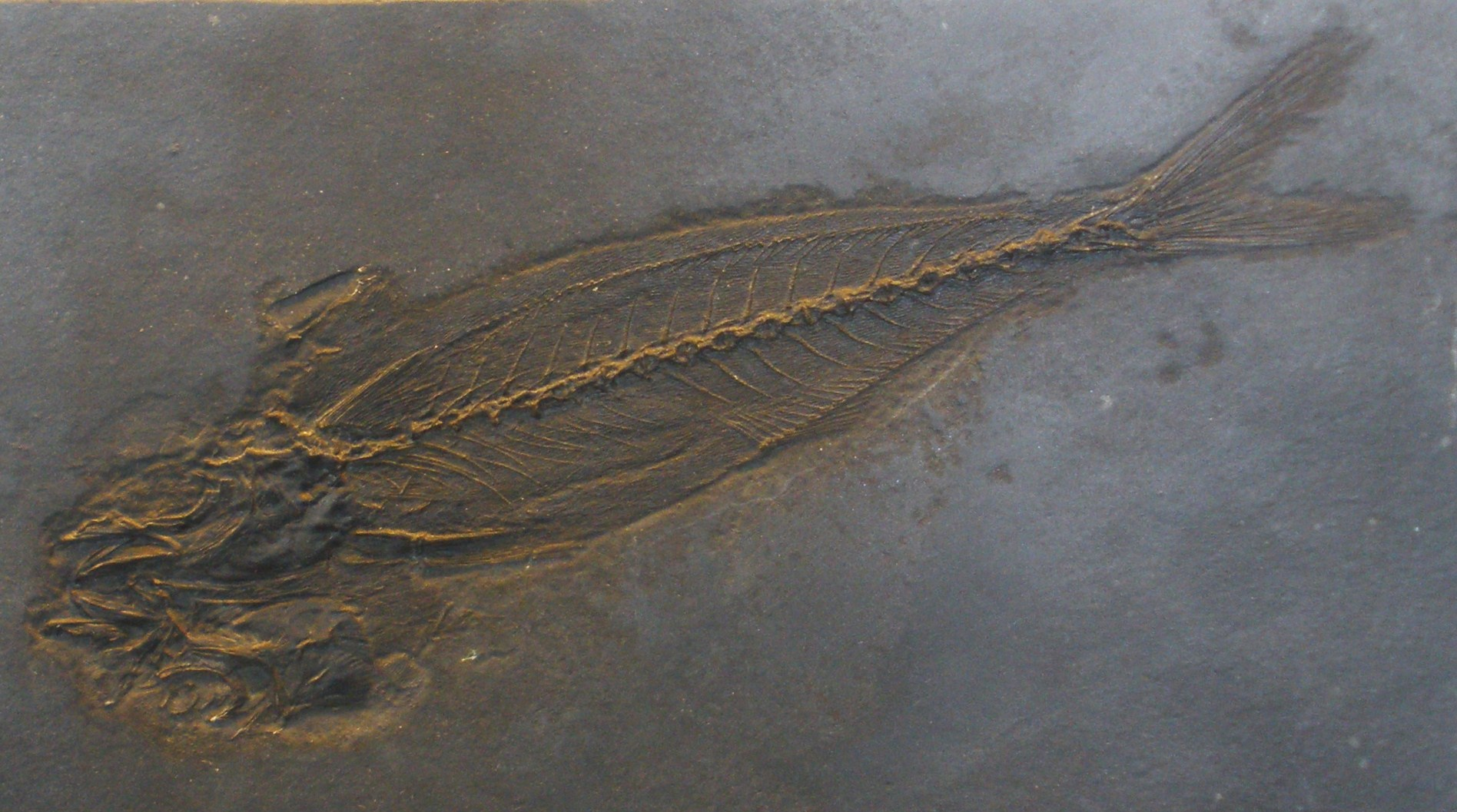
Fossil specimen of Opisthomyzon

Remoras are thought to be most closely related to the cobia and the dolphinfish, two other elongate members of the suborder Carangoidei. Together, they are thought to comprise the superfamily Echeneoidea. In some treatments, the Echeneoidea is instead restricted to just the remoras and Opisthomyzon.

The earliest remora-like fish in the fossil record is Opisthomyzon from the Early Oligocene of Switzerland. This taxon appears to be closely related to modern remoras and shares several of the iconic traits present in modern remoras, including an adhesive disk (although located posterior to the head rather than directly on it). However, due to its distinctive morphological features from modern remoras, it is placed in its own family, Opisthomyzonidae.

Also known from the Early Oligocene is the earliest true remora in the fossil record, Echeneis carpathica from Poland. The extinct genus Oligoremora from Germany is also known from the Rupelian.

== Characteristics ==
Remora front dorsal fins have evolved to enable them to adhere by suction to smooth surfaces, and they spend most of their lives clinging to a host animal such as a whale, turtle, shark or ray. It is probably a mutualistic arrangement as the remora can move around on the host, removing ectoparasites and loose flakes of skin, while benefiting from the protection provided by the host and the constant flow of water across its gills. Although many believe that remoras feed on particulate matter from the host's meals, some posit alternative theories; they claim their diets to be composed primarily of host feces. Further research is needed to validate the extent of this alternative feeding mechanism.

== Habitat ==
Remoras are tropical open-ocean dwellers, but are occasionally found in temperate or coastal waters if they have attached to large fish that have wandered into these areas. In the mid-Atlantic Ocean, spawning usually takes place in June and July; in the Mediterranean Sea, it occurs in August and September. The sucking disc begins to show when the young fish are about 1 cm (0.4 in) long. When the remora reaches about 3 cm (1.2 in), the disc is fully formed and the remora can then attach to other animals. The remora's lower jaw projects beyond the upper, and the animal lacks a swim bladder.

Some remoras associate with specific host species. They are commonly found attached to sharks, manta rays, whales, turtles, and dugongs, hence the common names "sharksucker" and "whalesucker". Smaller remoras also fasten onto fish such as tuna and swordfish. Smaller remoras have been observed entering, and sometimes attaching themselves inside, the mouths, gills and cloacae of large manta rays and whale sharks, sometimes causing injury.

The relationship between a remora and its host is most often taken to be one of commensalism, specifically phoresy. While some of the relationships are mutualistic, it is believed that dolphins with remoras attached do not benefit from the relationship. The attachment of the remora increases the dolphin's drag, which increases the energy needed for swimming. The remora is also thought to irritate the skin of the dolphin. A 2025 study similarly found that green turtles in the Red Sea grazed less when they had more remoras attached, and suggested that the nature of the turtle-remora relationship "may shift along the commensalism-parasitism spectrum depending on factors such as remora load".

== Physiology ==
Research into the physiology of the remora has been of significant benefit to the understanding of ventilation costs in fish.

Remoras, like many other fishes, have two different modes of ventilation. Ram ventilation is the process in which at higher speeds, the remora uses the force of the water moving past it to create movement of fluid in the gills. At lower speeds, the remora will use a form of active ventilation, in which the fish actively moves fluid through its gills. In order to use active ventilation, a fish must actively use energy to move the fluid; however, determining this energy cost is normally complicated due to the fish's movement when using either method. As a result, the remora has proved invaluable in finding this cost difference (since they will stick to a shark or tube, and hence remain stationary despite the movement, or lack thereof, of water). Experimental data from studies on remora found that the associated cost for active ventilation created a 3.7–5.1% increased energy consumption in order to maintain the same quantity of fluid flow the fish obtained by using ram ventilation.

Other research into the remora's physiology came about as a result of studies across multiple taxa, or using the remora as an out-group for certain evolutionary studies. Concerning the latter case, remoras were used as an outgroup when investigating tetrodotoxin resistance in remoras, pufferfish, and related species, finding remoras (specifically Echeneis naucrates) had a resistance of 6.1–5.5×10^{−8} M.

== Use for fishing ==
Some cultures use remoras to catch turtles. A cord or rope is fastened to the remora's tail, and when a turtle is sighted, the fish is released from the boat; it usually heads directly for the turtle and fastens itself to the turtle's shell, and then both remora and turtle are hauled in. Smaller turtles can be pulled completely into the boat by this method, while larger ones are hauled within harpooning range. This practice has been reported throughout the Indian Ocean, especially from eastern Africa near Zanzibar and Mozambique, and from northern Australia near Cape York and Torres Strait.

Similar reports come from Japan and from the Americas. Some of the first records of the "fishing fish" in the Western literature come from the accounts of the second voyage of Christopher Columbus. However, Leo Wiener considers the Columbus accounts to be apocryphal: what was taken for accounts of the Americas may have been, in fact, notes Columbus derived from accounts of the East Indies, his desired destination.

== In human culture ==
In ancient times, the remora was thought to stop a ship from sailing. In Latin, remora means "delay", while the genus name Echeneis comes from Greek ἔχειν, echein ("to hold") and ναῦς, naus ("a ship"). In a notable account by Pliny the Elder, the remora is blamed for the defeat of Mark Antony at the Battle of Actium and, indirectly, for the death of Caligula.

The remora is represented in the world of Pokémon as Remoraid. It was introduced in the Generation II games in 1999, with the Pokédex entry in Pokémon Silver describing a mutualistic relationship between Remoraid and Mantine, which resembles a manta ray.

== Gallery ==
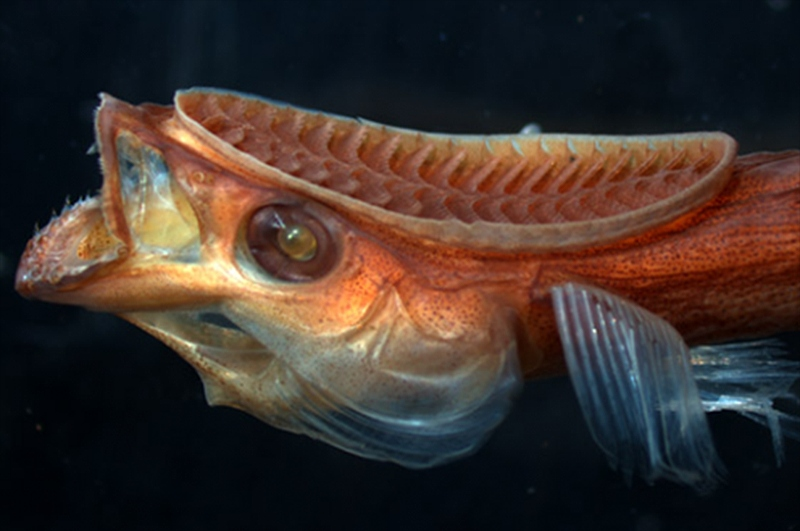

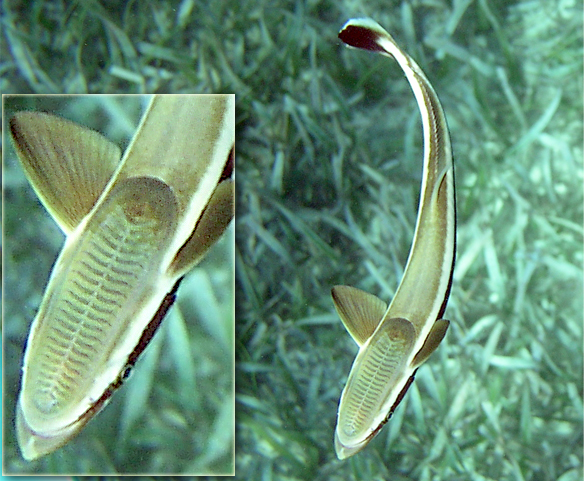
Live sharksucker, Echeneis naucrates

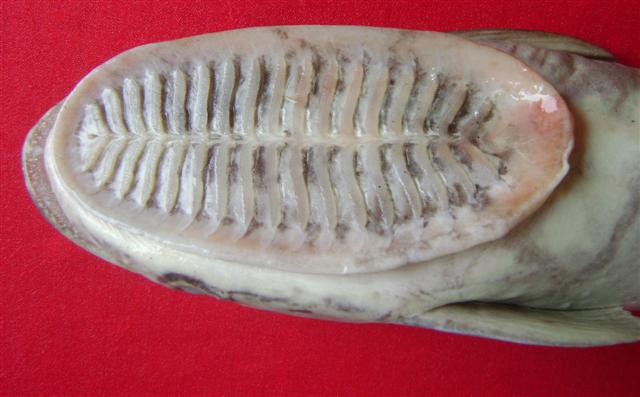
Common remora, Remora remora

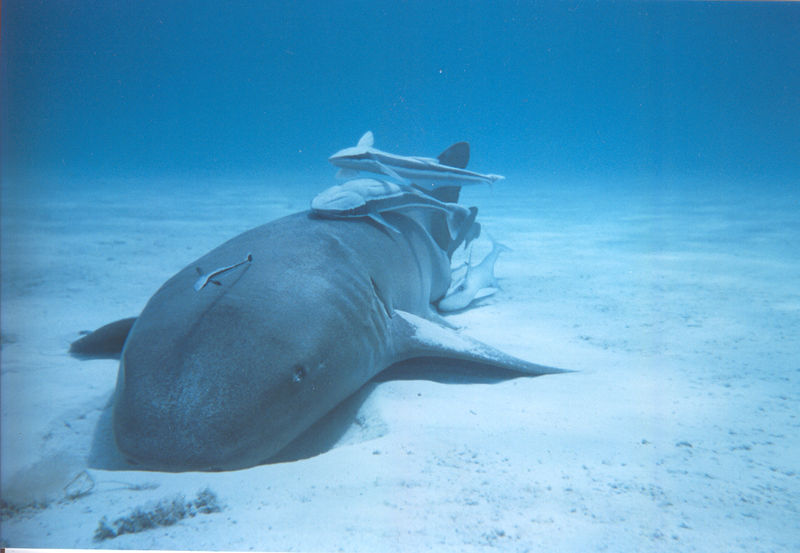
Nurse shark with remoras attending

== See also ==
- List of fish families
