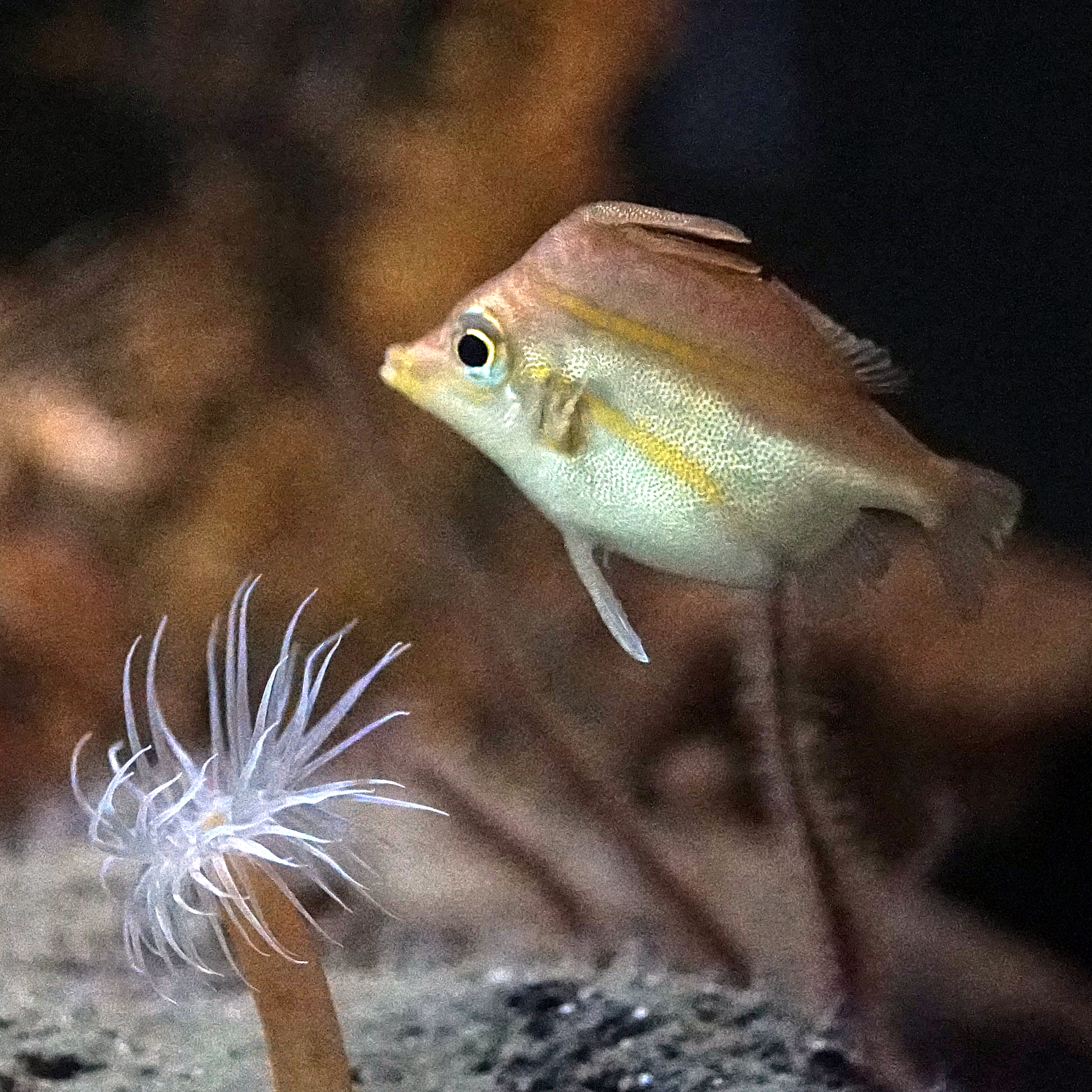
- Triacanthodes anomalus

Scientific classification
- Kingdom: Animalia
- Phylum: Chordata
- Class: Actinopterygii
- Order: Tetraodontiformes
- Family: Triacanthodidae
- Subfamily: Triacanthodinae; Gill, 1862

Genera
- See text

= Triacanthodinae =

Subfamily of fish

Triacanthodinae is a subfamily of marine ray-finned fishes belonging to the family Triacanthodidae, the spikefishes. This subfamily comprises nine genera and a total of nineteen species and all, except one species, are found in the tropical and subtropical waters of the Indo-Pacific. The exception is found in the western Atlantic Ocean.

== Taxonomy ==
Triacanthodinae is the nominate subfamily of the family Triacanthodidae, a taxon name first proposed by the American biologist Theodore Gill in 1862. In 1968 the American ichthyologist James C. Tyler proposed that the family Triacanthodidae be split into two subfamilies, establishing the subfamily Hollardiinae for the genera Hollardia and Parahollardia. The 5th edition of Fishes of the World classifies the family Triacanthodidae in the suborder Triacanthoidei along with the family Triacanthidae, the triplefins.

== Etymology ==
Triacanthodinae is a name based on its type genus Triacanthodes. which appends -odes, meaning "is similar to", onto Triacanthus, a genus these fishes were thought to be clsoley related to.

== Genera and species ==
Triacanthodinae contains the following genera and species:

- Atrophacanthus Fraser-Brunner, 1950
  - Atrophacanthus japonicus (Kamohara, 1941)
- Bathyphylax Myers 1934
  - Bathyphylax bombifrons Myers, 1934
  - Bathyphylax omen Tyler, 1966
  - Bathyphylax pruvosti Santini, 2006
- Halimochirurgus Alcock, 1899
  - Halimochirurgus alcocki Weber, 1913
  - Halimochirurgus centriscoides Alcock, 1899
- Johnsonina Myers, 1934
  - Johnsonina eriomma Myers, 1934
- Macrorhamphosodes Fowler, 1934
  - Macrorhamphosodes platycheilus Fowler. 1934
  - Macrorhamphosodes uradoi (Kamohara, 1933)
- Mephisto Tyler, 1966
  - Mephisto albomaculosus Matsuura, Psomadakis & Tun, 2018
  - Mephisto fraserbrunneri Tyler, 1966
- Paratriacanthodes Fowler, 1934
  - Paratriacanthodes abei Tyler, 1997
  - Paratriacanthodes herrei Myers, 1934
  - Paratriacanthodes retrospinis Fowler, 1934
- Triacanthodes Bleeker, 1857
  - Triacanthodes anomalus (Temminck & Schlegel, 1850)
  - Triacanthodes ethiops Alcock, 1894
  - Triacanthodes indicus Matsuura, 1982
  - Triacanthodes intermedius Matsuura & Fourmanoir, 1984
- Tydemania Weber, 1913
  - Tydemania navigatoris Weber, 1913

== Characteristics ==
Triacanthodinae spikefishes are distinguished from the taxa in the subfamily Hollardiinae by the possession of a low, thin crest on the front of the supraoccipital and in having a flat, horizontal basin-like projection to the plevic bone. The largest species in the subfamily is Halimochirurgus alcocki with a maximum published standard length of 21.6 cm (8.5 in) while the smallest is Atrophacanthus japonicus which has a maximum published standard length of 4.4 cm (1.7 in).

== Distribution and habitat ==
Triacanthodinae spikefishes are mainly found in the Indo-Pacific region, with one species Johnsonina eriomma in the Western Atlantic Ocean. These benthic fishes are found in deeper water.
