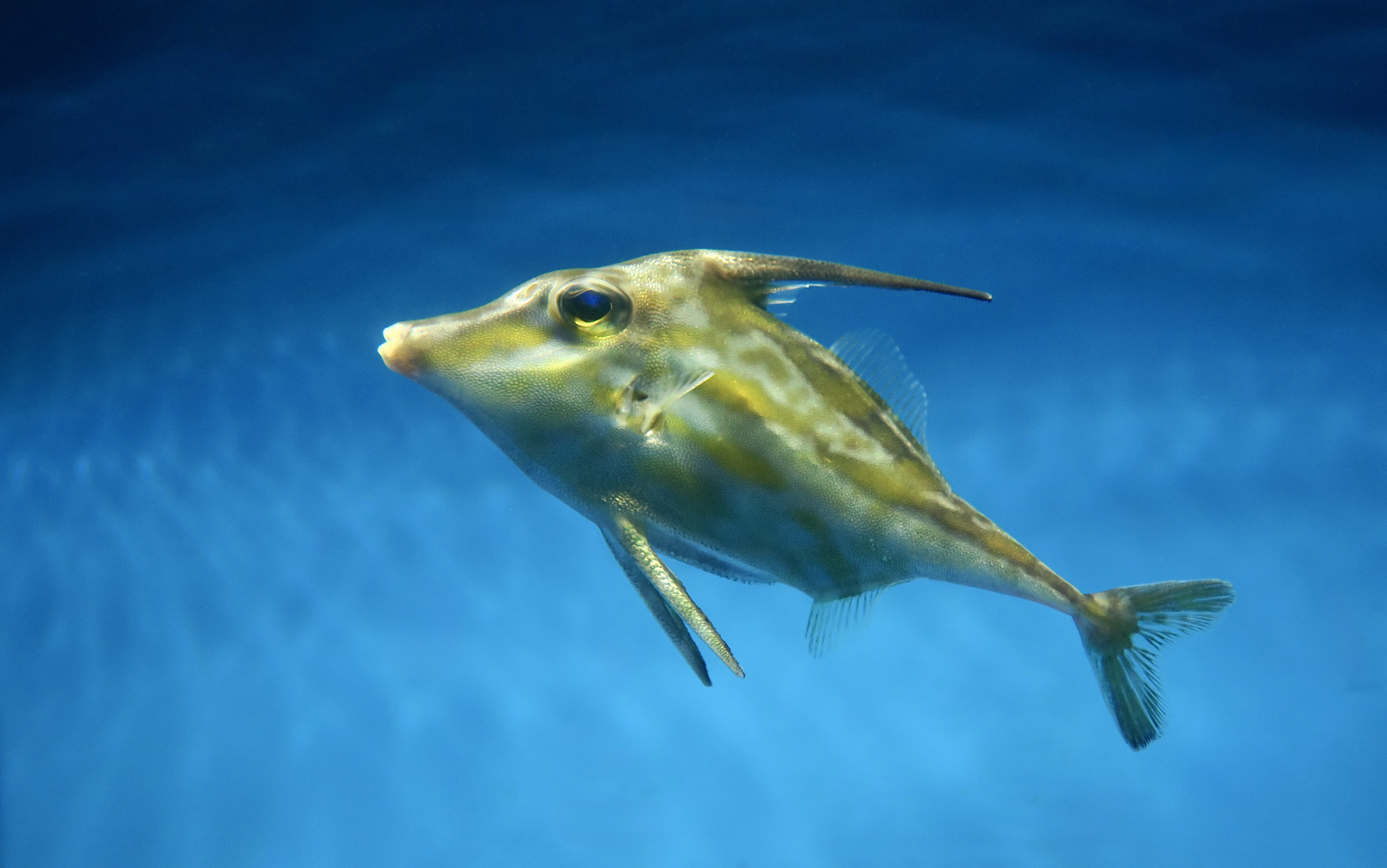

Scientific classification
- Kingdom: Animalia
- Phylum: Chordata
- Class: Actinopterygii
- Order: Tetraodontiformes
- Family: Triacanthidae
- Genus: Pseudotriacanthus; Fraser-Brunner, 1941
- Species: P. strigilifer

Binomial name
- Pseudotriacanthus strigilifer (Cantor, 1849)

Synonyms
- Monacanthus longirostris Hollard, 1843; Triacanthus strigilifer Cantor, 1849

= Pseudotriacanthus =

Genus of fishes

Pseudotriacanthus is a monospecific genus of marine ray-finned fish belonging to the family Triacanthidae, the triplespines or tripodfishes. The only species in this genus is Pseudotriacanthus strigilifer, the longspined tripodfish. This taxon is found in the Indo-West Pacific region.

== Taxonomy ==
Pseudotriacanthus was first proposed as a monotypic genus in 1941 by the British ichthyologist Alec Fraser-Brunner with Triacanthus strigilifer designated as its type species. T. strigilifer was first formally described in 1849 by the Danish physician and biologist Theodore Cantor, with its type locality given as the Sea of Penang off Peninsular Malaysia. In 1843, Henri Hollard described this species as Monacanthus longirostris, predating Cantor's name, but this name fell into disuse and is a nomen oblitum. In 1968, James C. Tyler classified the family Triacanthidae within the suborder Triacanthoidei alongside the Triacanthodidae. The fifth edition of Fishes of the World classifies the Triacanthoidei as a suborder of the order Tetraodontiformes.

== Etymology ==
Pseudotriacanthus comes from Ancient Greek ψεύδος (pseúdos), meaning "false", and Triacanthus, because although this taxon resemble Triacanthus and was previously placed in it, its resemblance and placement are false. The specific name strigilifer, which means "scraper bearer", the scales of this species were said to resemble small currycombs, and make the skin rough to the touch in every direction.

== Description ==
Pseudotriacanthus has 6 spines in the dorsal fin, the second spine is half the length of the first spine, and between 20 and 24 soft rays while the anal fin has 13 and 17 soft rays. The pelvis has a scale covered ventral surface which is wider to the front than at the rear. The scales have high, thin rides on their margins. The overall colour of the body is silvery-grey, darker dorsally. with a scattering of yellowish orange blotches. The upper two-thirds of the first spine of the dorsal fin are dusky, the soft part of the dorsal fin and the anal and pectoral fins are pale, and the caudal fin is yellowish. P. strigilifer has a maximum published total length of 25 cm (9.8 in), although 20 cm (7.9 in) is more typical.

== Distribution and habitat ==
Pseudotriacanthus has an Indo-West Pacific distribution and has been recorded in the Persian Gulf, the Gulf of Oman, the Arabian Sea, Bay of Bengal, Philippines, the South China Sea including the Gulf of Thailand, Indonesia, and northern Australia. It is found in coastal waters and estuaries, on sand or mud flats typically no deeper than 60 m (200 ft).

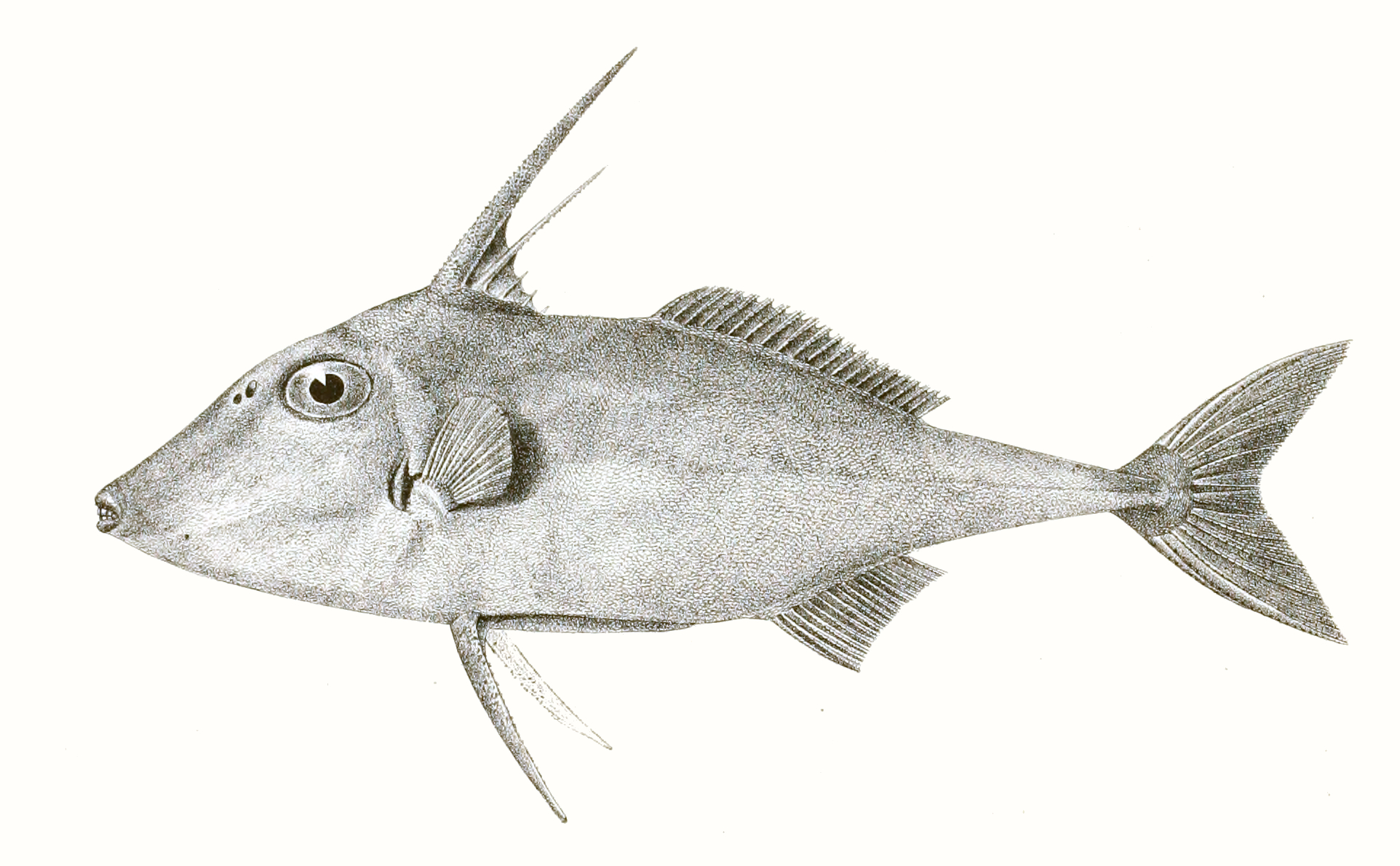
An illustration of a longspined tripodfish.
