= Tripodichthys =

- Tripodichthys angustifrons

Scientific classification
- Kingdom: Animalia
- Phylum: Chordata
- Class: Actinopterygii
- Division: Teleostei
- Order: Tetraodontiformes
- Family: Triacanthidae
- Genus: Tripodichthys; J. C. Tyler, 1968

Type species
- Triacanthus blochii Bleeker, 1852

Genus of fishes

Tripodichthys is a genus of marine ray-finned fish belonging to the family Triacanthidae, the triplespines or tripodfishes. The three species in this genus are found in the Indian Ocean and the western Pacific Ocean in shallow water over soft substrates.

== Taxonomy ==
Tripoichthys was first proposed as a genus in 1968 by the American ichthyologist James C. Tyler with Triacanthus blochii designated as its type species.T. blochii had originally been described in 1852 by the Dutch ichthyologist Pieter Bleeker with its type locality given as Singapore. Tripodichthys is classified within the family Triacanthidae and, in 1968, Tyler classified this family within the suborder Triacanthoidei alongside the Triacanthodidae. The 5th edition of Fishes of the World classifies the Triacanthoidei as suborder of the order Tetraodontiformes.

== Species ==
Tripodichthys currently contains the following three valid species:

- Tripodichthys angustifrons Hollard, 1854 (Black-flag tripodfish)
- Tripodichthys blochii (Bleeker, 1852) (Long-tail tripodfish)
- Tripodichthys oxycephalus (Bleeker, 1851) (Short-tail tripodfish)

== Etymology ==
Tripodichthys comes from tripod and Ancient Greek ἰχθύς (ikhthús), meaning "fish", as it was envisioned that the fish rested on the substrate using the two spines in the pelvic fin and the lower lobe of the caudal fin. The specific name of the type species honours Marcus Elieser Bloch, the describer of Triacanthus biaculeatus which was thought to be a congeneric with T. blochii. The specific name of T. angustifrons means "narrow forehead" and refers to this species thinner snout than Triacanthus brevirostris, its assumed congener. The third species has the specific name oxycephalus, meaning "sharp head", an allusion to the long, pointed head.

== Characteristics ==
Tripodichthys tripodfishes are characterised by having a scale covered part of the pelvis which tapers towards the rear. The second spine in the dorsal fin is clearly less than half the kength of the first spine and the base of the dorsal fins have a total length which is 1.5 to 1.7 times longer than the base of the anal fin. The scales have a low, cruciform ridge on them. In T. oxycephalus the pelvis is wide between bases of the pelvic fin spines and the caudal peduncle is short. In the other two species the pelvis is thin between the bases of the pelvic fin spines and they have a long caudal peduncle. In T. agustifrons the membrane of the spiny dorsal fin is typically dark between the first four spines, there are 22-24 soft rays in the second dorsal fin and 18-19 in the anal fin. In T. blochii the spiny dorsal fin has a pale membrane, there are 20-24 soft rays in the second dorsal in and 13-15 in the anal fin. These fishes have maximum published total lengths of 20 cm (7.9 in), in the case of T. angustifrons and T. oxtcephalus, and 15 cm (5.9 in) in T. blochii.

== Distribution and habitat ==
Tripodichthys tripodfishes are found in the Indian and Western Pacific Oceans. T. angustifrons has been recorded from Indonesia and northern Australia, T. blochii from the South China Sea and Indonesia, with strays recorded in China and Japan, while T. oxycephalus from the Bay of Bengal, South China Sea and Arafura Sea. They are found at depths down to 50 m (160 ft) over sand and mud substrates.
