= Mephisto albomaculosus =

Scientific classification
- Kingdom: Animalia
- Phylum: Chordata
- Class: Actinopterygii
- Order: Tetraodontiformes
- Family: Triacanthodidae
- Genus: Mephisto
- Species: M. albomaculosus

Binomial name
- Mephisto albomaculosus Matsuura, Psomadakis & Tun, 2018

Species of fish

Mephisto albomaculosus, the white spotted spikefish, is a species of marine ray-finned fish belonging to the family Triacanthodidae, the spikefishes. This species is found in the Indian Ocean.

== Taxonomy ==
Mephisto albomaculosus was first formally described in 2018 by Keiichi Matsuura, Peter N. Psomadakis and Mya Than Tun with its type locality given as off the Tanintharyi coast of Myanmar in the Andaman Sea at 10°21.85'N, 96°44.83'E form a depth between 376 and 379 m (1,234 and 1,243 ft). It was the second species to be described in the genus Mephisto. Mephisto is classified in the nominate subfamily of the family Triacanthodidae, the Triacanthodinae. The 5th edition of Fishes of the World classifies the family Triacanthodidae in the suborder Triacanthoidei in the order Tetraodontiformes.

== Etymology ==
Mephisto albomaculosus is classified within the genus Mephisto, this is the name of a demon, the Mephistopheles of the Faustian tales of German folklore. This name refers to the reddish exterior, black interior and horn-like spikes of the type species. The specific name albomaculosus means white spotted", a reference to the may whote spots on the ehad and body.

== Description ==
Mephisto albomaculosus is distinguished from its only known congener, M. fraserbrunneri by the pinkish-red body being marked with many clear round white spots, approximately the same size of the eye. These spots are distributed over the lower half of the head and body. The holotype of M. albomaculosus had a standard length of 94.4 mm (3.72 in).

== Distribution and habitat ==
Mephisto albomaculosus has been recorded twice, the holotype from the Andaman Sea off Myanmar taken from a deoth between 376 and 379 m (1,234 and 1,243 ft), and a photograph referred to as M. cf albomaculosus taken at a depth of 75 m (246 ft) in the Bay of Bengal.
