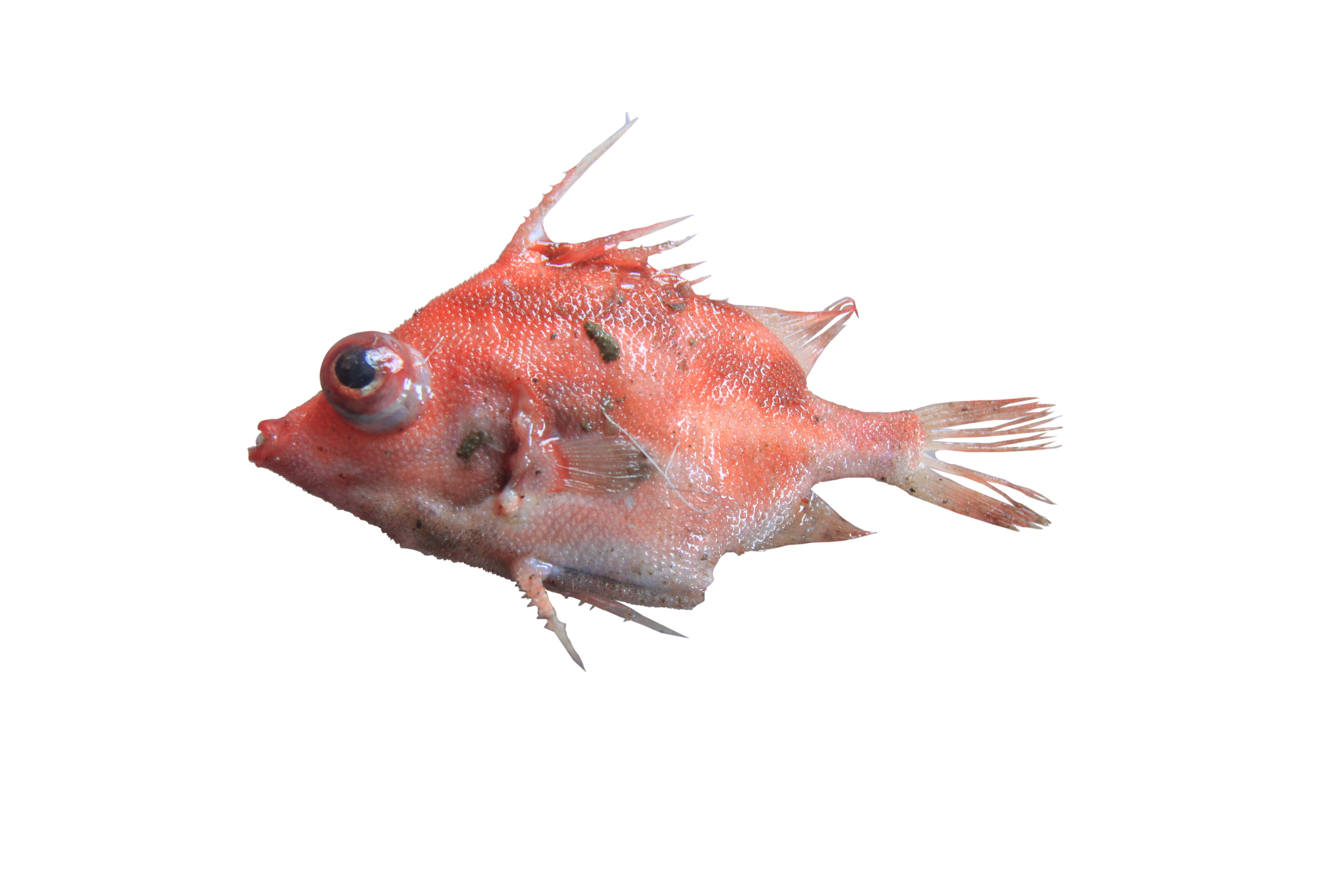
- Paratriacanthodes retrospinis

Scientific classification
- Kingdom: Animalia
- Phylum: Chordata
- Class: Actinopterygii
- Order: Tetraodontiformes
- Family: Triacanthodidae
- Subfamily: Triacanthodinae
- Genus: Paratriacanthodes; Fowler, 1934

Type species
- Paratriacanthodes retrospinis Fowler, 1934

Synonyms
- Triradulifer Fraser-Brunner, 1941

= Paratriacanthodes =

Genus of fishes

Paratriacanthodes is a genus of marine ray-finned fishes belonging to the family Triacanthodidae, the spikefishes. These fishes are found in the Indian and Pacific Oceans.

== Taxonomy ==
Paratriacanthodes was first proposed as a monospecific genus in 1934 by the American zoologist Henry Weed Fowler when he described P. retrospinis as its only species, he also designated as the type species of the genus. When Fowler described P. retrospinis he gave its type locality as the China Sea in the vicinity of Taiwan at 21˚36'00N, 117˚27'00E, Albatross station D.5517 from a depth of 421 m (1,381 ft). Later in 1935 George S. Myers added a second species P. herrei from the Philippines and in 1967 James C. Tyler added a third, P. abei from the South China Sea. In 1968 Tyler classified this genus in the nominate subfamily of the family Triacanthodidae, the Triacanthodinae. The 5th edition of Fishes of the World classifies the family Triacanthodidae in the suborder Triacanthoidei in the order Tetraodontiformes.

== Species ==
There are currently 3 recognized species in this genus:

- Paratriacanthodes abei Tyler, 1997
- Paratriacanthodes herrei Myers, 1934
- Paratriacanthodes retrospinis Fowler, 1934 (Sawspine spikefish)

== Etymology ==
Paratriacanthodes prefixes the name of the type genus of the Triacanthodidae, Triacanthodes, with para, meaning "near to". This refers to the close relationship between Paratriacanthodes and Triacanthodes. The specific name of the type species, retrospinis means "backward spine" and refers to the backward pointing barb on the first spine in the dorsal fin and on the spine in the pelvic fin. The specific names of P. abei and P. herrei honour the Japanese ichthyologist Tokiharu Abe and the American ichthyologist Albert William Herre respectively.

== Characteristics ==
Paratriacanthodes spikefishes have a flat lower surface to the pelvis, the pelvis tapers to a point to the rear being much broader between the spines of the pelvic fins and at its rear, this feature places the genus in the subfamily Triacanthodinae. These fishes have six spines in the dorsal fin and these descrease in size towards the rear, the smallest sixth spine is, however, still clearly visible. They have a smout which is not as long as the remainder of the ead. The gill slit is short and does extend below the base of the pectoral fin. There is a single row of large conical teeth in each jaw. The largest species in the genus is P. retrospinis with a maximum published standard length of 12 cm (4.7 in).

== Distribution and habitat ==
Paratriacanthodes spikefishes are found in the Indo-Pacific with P. retrospinis having a wide distribution being recorded from East Africa, Japan, the Kyushu-Palau Ridge, the South China Sea, Australia and New Caledonia. P. abei, however, has only been recorded from the South China Sea and P. herrei is unknown outside of Philippines waters. These spikefishes are demersal and are found at depths between 183 and 384 m (600 and 1,260 ft)
