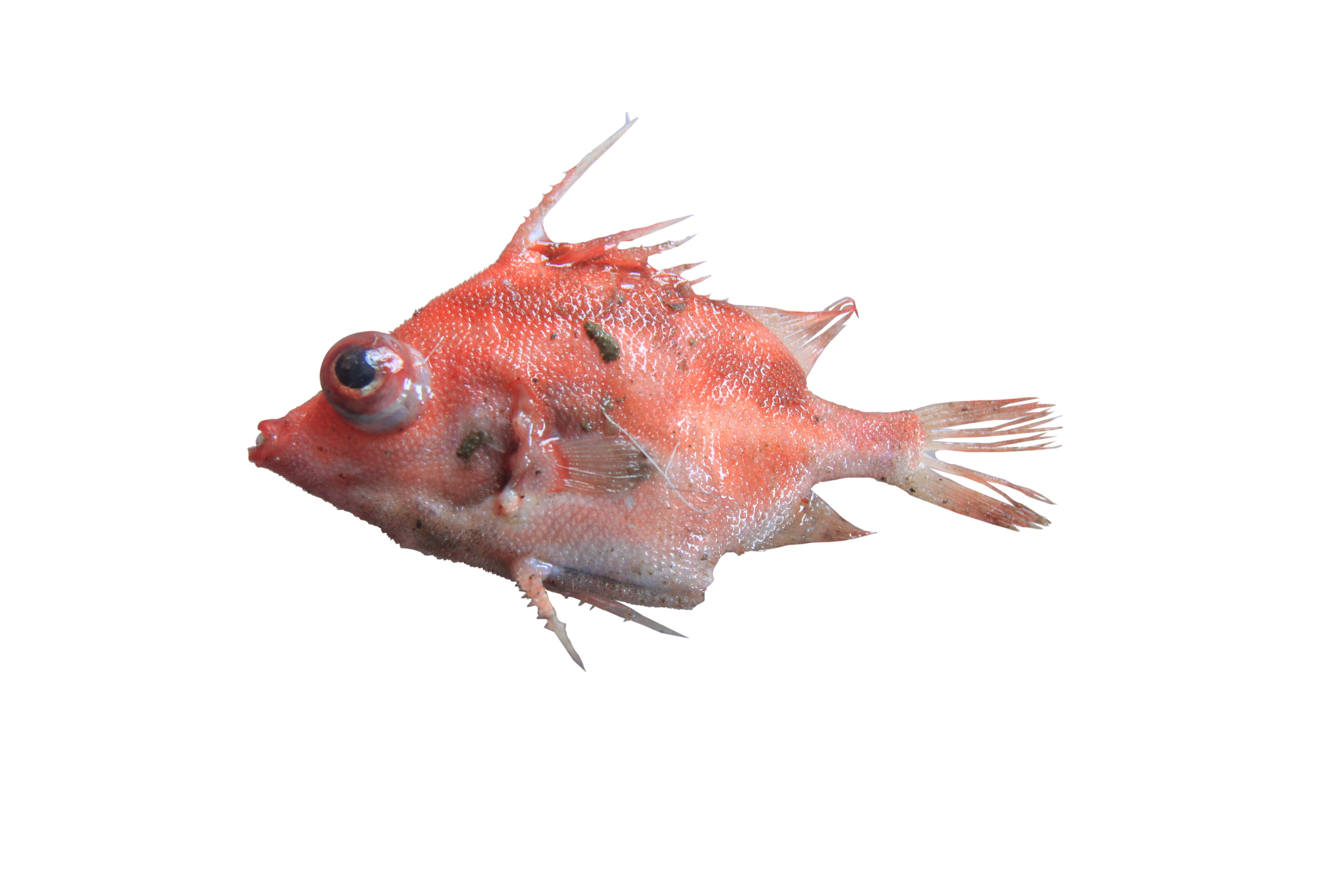

Scientific classification
- Kingdom: Animalia
- Phylum: Chordata
- Class: Actinopterygii
- Order: Tetraodontiformes
- Family: Triacanthodidae
- Genus: Paratriacanthodes
- Species: P. retrospinis

Binomial name
- Paratriacanthodes retrospinis Fowler, 1934

= Paratriacanthodes retrospinis =

Species of fish

Paratriacanthodes retrospinis, the sawspine spikefish, is a species of marine ray-finned fish belonging to the family Triacanthodidae, the spikefishes. This species is found in the Indo-Pacific region.

== Taxonomy ==
Paratriacanthodes retrospinis was first formally described in 1934 by the American zoologist Henry Weed Fowler with its type locality given as the China Sea in the vicinity of Taiwan at 21˚36'00N, 117˚27'00E, Albatross station D.5517 from a depth of 421 m (1,381 ft). When Fowler described this species he proposed a new monospecific genus for it, Paratriacanthodes , and designated P. retrospinis as its type species. In 1968 James C. Tyler classified the genus Paratriacanthodes in the nominate subfamily of the family Triacanthodidae, the Triacanthodinae. The 5th edition of Fishes of the World classifies the family Triacanthodidae in the suborder Triacanthoidei in the order Tetraodontiformes.

== Etymology ==
Paratriacanthodes retrospinis is the type species of the genus Paratriacanthodes, a name which prefixes the name of the type genus of the Triacanthodidae, Triacanthodes, with para, meaning "near to". This refers to the close relationship between Paratriacanthodes and Triacanthodes. The specific name, retrospinis means "backward spine" and refers to the backward pointing barb on the first spine in the dorsal fin and on the spine in the pelvic fin.

== Description ==
Paratriacanthodes retrospinis has a short snout, pointed at the upper end, large eyes projecting outward, and relatively short gill openings. It usually is brightly orange colored on the upper half and of paler color on the lower half of the body. Rge dorsal fin is supported by 6 spines and 15 soft rays while the anal fin contains 13 soft rays.

== Distribution and habitat ==
Paratriacanthodes retrospinis is widely distributed in the Indo-West Pacific from South and East Africa to southern Japan and New Caledonia. It has been reported from depths of 418 – 920 m.
