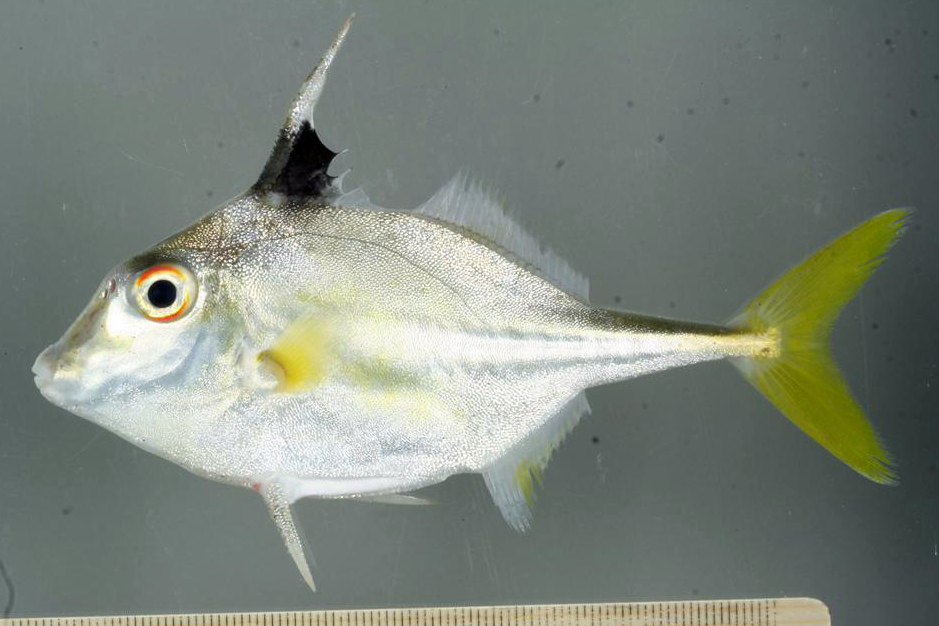

Scientific classification
- Kingdom: Animalia
- Phylum: Chordata
- Class: Actinopterygii
- Order: Tetraodontiformes
- Family: Triacanthidae
- Genus: Triacanthus
- Species: T. nieuhofii

Binomial name
- Triacanthus nieuhofii Bleeker, 1852

= Triacanthus nieuhofii =

Species of fish

Triacanthus nieuhofii, the silver tripodfish, is a species of marine ray-finned fish belonging to the family Triacanthidae, the triplespines or tripodfishes. This species is found in the Indo-West Pacific region.

== Taxonomy ==
Triacanthus nieuhofii was first formally described in 1852 by the Dutch physician, herpetologist and ichthyologist Pieter Bleeker with its type locality given as Siboga, west of Sumatra. It was the second specuies to be described within the genus Triacanthus, the first was the type speciesT. biaculeatus. This genus is classified in the family Triacanthidae within the suborder Triacanthoidei alongside the Triacanthodidae. The 5th edition of Fishes of the World classifies the Triacanthoidei as suborder of the order Tetraodontiformes.

== Etymology ==
Triacanthus nieuhofii is classified within the genus Triacanthus, a name that prefixes acanthus, which means “thorn” or “spine”, with tri-, meaning “three”, this is an allusion to the long and robust first spine of the dorsal fin and the two large spines in the pelvic fins. The specific name, honours Johan Nieuhof, the Dutch explorer and sinologist who first described and illustrated this species, calling it Hoornvisch.

== Description ==
Triacanthus nieuhofii has six spines in the first dorsal fin and between 22 and 26 soft rays in the second dorsal fin and between 18 and 21 soft rays in the anal fin. The dorsal profile of the head is rather convex to the front of the first spine in the dorsal fin. The pelvis does not clearly taper to a point towards the tail. It is pale silvery brown on the upper body, fading to silvery white on the lower body, there are a number of irregularly shaped dark yellow blotches on the flank and a large blackish blotch between the first two spines if the dorsal fin which pales slightly between the second and third spines. The firs spine in the dorsal fin is white and the soft dorsal fin, anal fin and pectoral fins are pale with the caudal fin being white marked with yellow lines. This species has a maximum published total length of 28 cm (11 in)>

== Distribution and habitat ==
Triacanthus nieufofii is found in the Indian Ocean and the Western Pacific Ocean where it has been recorded from the Arabian Sea, Bay of Bengal, Andaman Sea, Indonesia and the South China Sea. It is also found in northern Australia where it occurs from Broome to Admiralty Gulf in Western Australia, it may also occur in the Northern Territory. The silver tripodfish is found on sand or mud flats along coasts and in estuaries where it feeds on benthic invertebrates.
