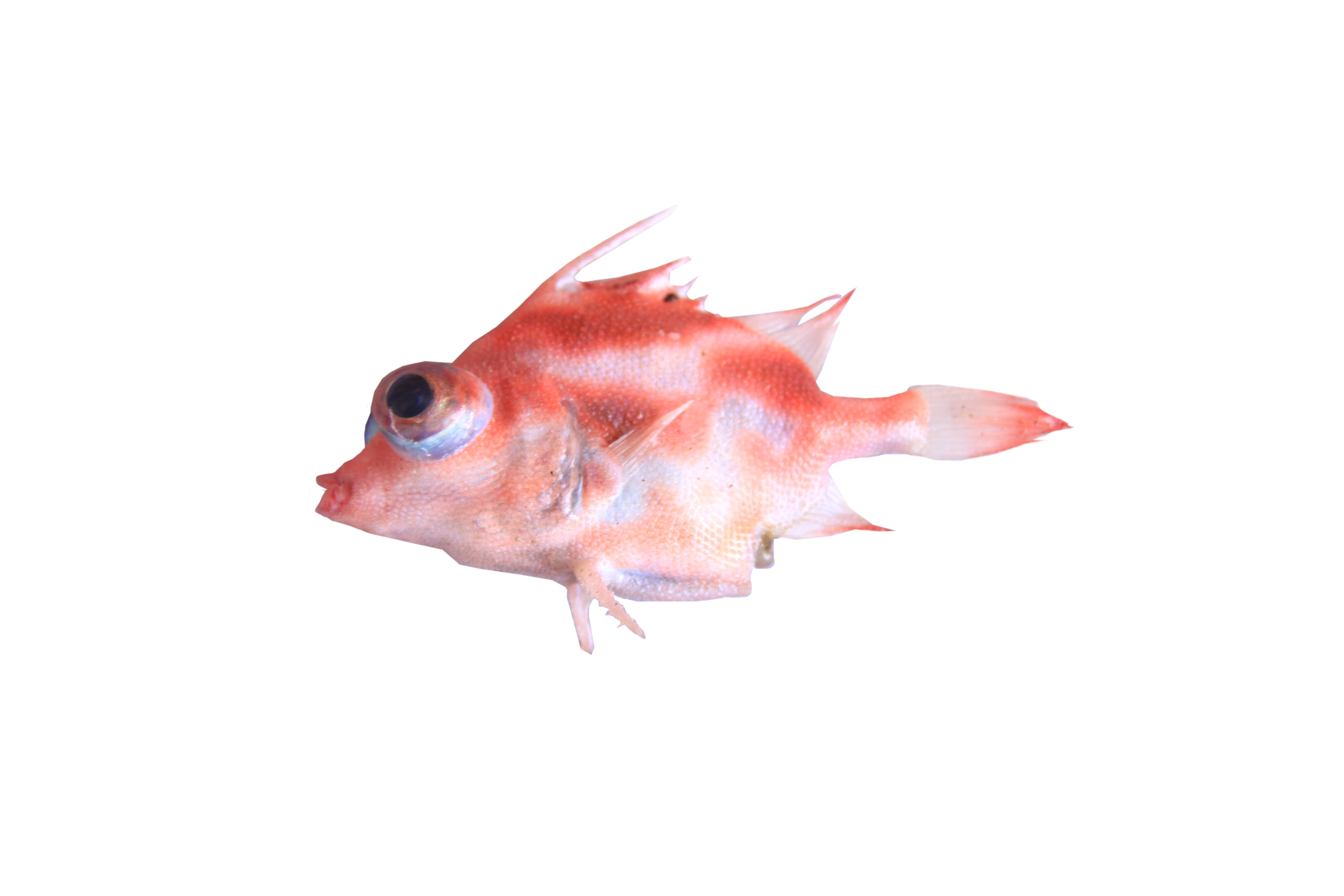

Scientific classification
- Kingdom: Animalia
- Phylum: Chordata
- Class: Actinopterygii
- Order: Tetraodontiformes
- Family: Triacanthodidae
- Genus: Triacanthodes
- Species: T. ethiops

Binomial name
- Triacanthodes ethiops Alcock, 1894

Synonyms
- Paratriacanthodes myersi Fraser-Brunner, 1941; Triacanthodes anomalus japonicus Kamohara, 1943

= Triacanthodes ethiops =

Species of fish

Triacanthodes ethiops, the shortsnout spikefish, is a species of marine ray-finned fish belonging to the family Triacanthodidae, the spikefishes. This species is found in the Northwestern Pacific Ocean.

== Taxonomy ==
Triacanthodes ethiops was first formally described in 1894 by the British physician, naturalist, and carcinologist, Alfred William Alcock, with its type locality given as the Bay of Bengal at 13°51'12"N, 80°12'12"E, Investigator station 162, from a depth of 145–250 fathoms (870–1,500 ft; 265–457 m). This species is classified in the genus Triacanthodes, which is the type genus of the family Triacanthodidae and of the subfamily Triacanthodinae. The fifth edition of Fishes of the World classifies the family Triacanthodidae in the suborder Triacanthoidei in the order Tetraodontiformes.

== Etymology ==
Triacanthodes ethiops is classified in the genus Triacanthodes, a name which suffixes -odes, meaning "having the form of", onto Triacanthus, as it was thought that this genus was closely related to Triacanthus. The specific name, ethiops, means "blackened" or "scorched", a reference to the black colour of the preserved holotype, although this is not the colour of this fish in life.

== Description ==
Triacanthodes ethiops has six spines and 15 or 16 soft rays supporting the dorsal fin. The nala fin has 12 or 13 soft rays. There is a single spine and one or two soft rays in the pelvic fins. The eye has a diameter slightly greater than the length of the snout, and the area between the eyes is either straight or slightly indented. The overall colour of the body is reddish, paler ventrally, marked with three large yellow stripes and two smaller orange stripes, the lower yellow stripe running along the mid-flank from the eye to the caudal peduncle. This species has a maximum published standard length of 9.4 cm (3.7 in).

== Distribution and habitat ==
Triacanthodes ethiops has an Indo-West Pacific distribution and has been recorded to be found in East Africa, the Maldives, Japan, the East China Sea, Philippines, Indonesia, New Caledonia, and Australia. It is a demersal fish found at depths between 50 and 458 m (164 and 1,503 ft).
