= Atrophacanthus =

Scientific classification
- Kingdom: Animalia
- Phylum: Chordata
- Class: Actinopterygii
- Order: Tetraodontiformes
- Family: Triacanthodidae
- Subfamily: Triacanthodinae
- Genus: Atrophacanthus; Fraser-Brunner, 1950
- Species: A. japonicus

Binomial name
- Atrophacanthus japonicus (Kamohara, 1941)

Synonyms
- Tydemania japonica Kamohara, 1941; Atrophacanthus danae Fraser-Brunner 1950

Genus of fishes

Atrophacanthus is a monospecific genus of marine ray-finned fish belonging to the family Triacanthodidae, the spikefishes. The only species in the genus is Atrophacanthus japonicus, the upward-mouth spikefish, which is found in the Indo-West Pacific region.

== Taxonomy ==
Atrophacanthus was first proposed as a monospecific genus in 1950 by the British ichthyologist Alec Fraser-Brunner when he described Atrophacanthus danae, its type species by monotypy. Fraser-Brenner's A. danae had its type locality given as the Sulawesi Sea. A. danae was subsequently shown to be a synonym of Tydemania japonica which had been described in 1941 by the Japanese ichthyologist Toshiji Kamohara with its type locality given as Shikoku in the Kōchi Prefecture, Japan. This taxon is classified within the subfamily Triacanthodinae of the spikefish family Triacanthodidae, within the suborder Triacanthoidei of the order Tetraodontiformes in the 5th edition of Fishes of the World. Within the subfamily Triacanthodinae this taxon is the sister taxon of Macrorhamphosodes.

== Etymology ==
Atrophacanthus combines atrophia, meaning "rudimentary", and acanthus, which means "thorn" or "spine", an allusion to the poorly developed rearmost 3 spines in the dorsal fin. The specific name Japonicus refers to the type locality of Tydemania japonica.

== Description ==
Atrophacanthus has the first three spines in the dorsalfin are well developed and clearly exposed, the fourth spine is clearly shorter than the first three but is still visible above the skin but the fifth and sixth spines very poorly developed and either just protrude on the surface of the skin or so not protrude at all. The first spine is rather short, not extending far beyond the fourth spine when folded down. There are 13 or 14 soft rays in the dorsal fin and between 11 and 13 in the anal fin. The short conical teeth are arranged in a single row on each jaw with between 19 and 23 teeth in upper jaw and 22–27 in the lower jaw. the dorsal profile of the head is neither convex or concave. The mouth is at the end of the short snout. The gill opening is relatively long, typically reaching down to around one-half to four-fifths of the base of the pectoral fin. This species has a maximum published standard length of 4.4 cm (1.7 in).

== Distribution and habitat ==
Atrophacanthus is found in the Indo-West Pacific region where it has been recorded from Japan, the Philippines, Sulawesi Sea, off Tanzania, and probably from South Africa, with records as far east as the Mariana Islands. This is a bathypelagic zone and benthic fish found at depths between 300 and 2,000 m (980 and 6,560 ft).

== Biology ==
Atrophacanthus is carnivorous and the stomach contents of two juveniles collected near Guam consisted of foraminifera and thecosome pteropods. Only large juveniles have been collected in deeper waters while the few adult specimens have been collected from shallower depths continental shelf and slope, suggesting a long period of pelagic larval development before the larger adults settle.
