= Mephisto fraserbrunneri =

Scientific classification
- Kingdom: Animalia
- Phylum: Chordata
- Class: Actinopterygii
- Division: Teleostei
- Order: Tetraodontiformes
- Family: Triacanthodidae
- Genus: Mephisto; J. C. Tyler, 1966
- Species: M. fraserbrunneri

Binomial name
- Mephisto fraserbrunneri J. C. Tyler, 1966

Species of fish

Mephisto fraserbrunneri, the devil's spikefish, is a species of marine ray-finned fish belonging to the family Triacanthodidae, the spikefishes. This species is found in the Indian Ocean.

== Taxonomy ==
Mephisto fraserbrunneri Was first formally described in 1966 by the American ichthyologist James C. Tyler with its type locality given as the Bay of Bengal at 10°39'N, 97°06'E from a depth of 159 fathoms (954 ft; 291 m). When Tyler described this species he proposed a new monospecific genus, Mephisto, and designated M. fraserbrunneri as its type species. In 1968 Tyler classified this genus in the nominate subfamily of the family Triacanthodidae, the Triacanthodinae. The 5th edition of Fishes of the World classifies the family Triacanthodidae in the suborder Triacanthoidei in the order Tetraodontiformes.

== Etymology ==
Mephisto fraserbrunneri is classified within the genus Mephisto, this is the name of a demon, the Mephistopheles of the Faustian tales of German folklore. This name refers to the reddish exterior, black interior and horn-like spikes of the type species. The specific name honours the British ichthyologist Alec Fraser-Brunner, who when Tyler described this species was director of the Van Kleef Aquarium in Singapore, for his work on fishes in the order Plectognathi.

== Description ==
Mephisto fraserbrunneri has 6 spines and 16 soft rays in the dorsal fin while the anal fin has 14 soft rays. The pectoral fin has 14 soft rays and the pelvic fin has a single spine and a single soft ray. The gill slit is long, reaching down as far as just under the lower edge of the base of the pectoral fin. The colour of the body is pinkish, other than a pale silvery patch on the abdomen and darker blotching on the upper half of the body. This species has a maximum published standard length of 105.8 mm (4.17 in).

== Distribution and habitat ==
Mephisto fraserbrunneri is found in the Indian Ocean. The holotype was collected in the Andaman Sea, with other specimens collected from off Somalia, off Kerala and in the Lakshadweep Sea. The specimens have been collected from depths between 176 and 415 m (577 and 1,362 ft).

== Diet ==
Mephisto fraserbrunneri have had their diet investigated by examining the gut contents. The diet was dominated by formaniferans, both benthic and pelagic species, as well as pteropods, tusk shells, echinoderm parts and crustaceans.
