= Bathyphylax =

Scientific classification
- Kingdom: Animalia
- Phylum: Chordata
- Class: Actinopterygii
- Order: Tetraodontiformes
- Family: Triacanthodidae
- Subfamily: Triacanthodinae
- Genus: Bathyphylax; G. S. Myers, 1934

Type species
- Bathyphylax bombifrons Myers, 1934

Species
- See text

Genus of fishes

Bathyphylax is a genus of marine ray-finned fishes belonging to the family Triacanthodidae, the spikefishes. The fishes in this genus are found in the deep waters of the Indian and Pacific Oceans.

== Taxonomy ==
Bathyphylax was first proposed as a monospecific genus in 1935 by the American ichthyologist George S. Myers when he described Bathyphylax bombifrons, which he also designated as its type species. When Myers described B. bombifrons he gave its type locality given as the "China Sea" off Hong Kong. In 1968 the American ichthyologist James C. Tyler classified this genus in the nominate subfamily of the family Triacanthodidae, the Triacanthodinae. The 5th edition of Fishes of the World classifies the family Triacanthodidae in the suborder Triacanthoidei in the order Tetraodontiformes.

== Etymology ==
Bathyphylax is a compound of bathy, meaning "deep", and phylax, which means "guard", an allusion which Myers did not explain but it may refer to the depth the holotype of B. bombifrons was collected at and its large eyes, metaphorically all seeing. The specific name of the type species combines bombus, meaning "humming" or "buzzing" with frons, which means "forehead". This is an allusion to the tube-like snout, resembling a wind instrument. The specific ephithets of the other two species are; omen, which means "prophecy" or "augury", and refers to the species so named being a "precursor" of the longs snouted Halimochirurgus; and the eponym pruvosti, which honours Patrice Pruvost who was the manager of the ichthyological collection at Muséum national d’Histoire naturelle in Paris who mad e material form the museum's collection available to the species author, Frenceso Santini.

== Species ==
There are currently three recognized species in this genus:

- Bathyphylax bombifrons G. S. Myers, 1934 (Boomer spikefish)
- Bathyphylax omen J. C. Tyler, 1966
- Bathyphylax pruvosti Santini, 2006

== Characteristics ==
Bathphylax spike fishes have a flat lower surface to the pelvis, the pelvis tapers to a point to the rear being much broader between the spines of the pelvic fins and at its rear, this feature places the genus in the subfamily Triacanthodinae, and it is around twice as long as it is wide. They have a snout which is shorter than the length of the head and of the diameter of the orbit but the smout is longer than the distance between the upper eye and the gill cover. They have conical teeth arranged in a singlet series without any isolated inner teeth. In the dorsal fin the spines decrease in length suddentlu with the rear spines being much smaller than the front spines with the fifth and sixth spines just protruding through the skin, although they can be clearly seen, when the first spine is depressed it extends as far as thetip of the sixth. The dorsal profile of the head is concave. These fishes have maximum published standard lengths of 9.3 cm (3.7 in) for B. bombifrons, 9.4 cm (3.7 in) for B. omen and 11.9 cm (4.7 in) for B. pruvosti.

== Distribution and habitat ==
Bathyphylax spike fishes are found in the Indo-Pacific region with B. bombifrons being known from waters off Kenya, off Hng Kong, Australia and New Caledonia, B. omen has only been recorded from off Kenya and off Japan, while B. pruvosti from the Marquesas Islands. These bathydemersal species have been recorded at depths between 108 and 615 m (354 and 2,018 ft).
