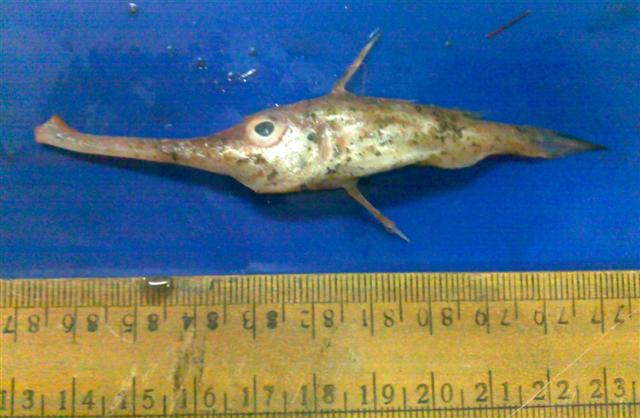
- Macrorhamphosodes platycheilus

Scientific classification
- Kingdom: Animalia
- Phylum: Chordata
- Class: Actinopterygii
- Order: Tetraodontiformes
- Family: Triacanthodidae
- Subfamily: Triacanthodinae
- Genus: Macrorhamphosodes; Fowler, 1934

Type species
- Macrorhamphosodes platycheilus Fowler, 1934

= Macrorhamphosodes =

Genus of fishes

Macrorhamphosodes, the trumpetsnouts, is a genus of marine ray-finned fishes belonging to the family Triacanthodidae, the spikefishes. The fishes in this genus are found in the deep waters of the Indian and Pacific Oceans.

== Taxonomy ==
Macrorhamphosodes was first proposed as a monospecific genus in 1934 by the American zoologist Henry Weed Fowler with Macrorhamphosodes platycheilus designated as its type species, and its only species. M. platycheilus was also described by Fowler in 1934 and its type locality given as Sombrero Island off Luzonin the Philippines from Albatross station 5118 from a depth of 340 fathoms (2,040 ft; 620 m). In 1933 the Japanese ichthyologist Toshiji Kamohara has described Halimochirus uradoi from Kochi Prefecture in Japan, the genus name was a misspelling of Halimochirurgus. In 1968 James C. Tyler reclassified this species to this genus as M. uradoi. Also in 1968, Tyler classified this genus in the nominate subfamily of the family Triacanthodidae, the Triacanthodinae. The 5th edition of Fishes of the World classifies the family Triacanthodidae in the suborder Triacanthoidei in the order Tetraodontiformes.

== Etymology ==
Macrorhamphosodes suffixes –oides, which means "having the form of" onto Macroramphosus, the snipefishes, referring to the resemblance the type species of this genus to the snipefishes. The specific name of M. platycheilus combines platys, meaning "wide", and cheilus, which means "lip", an allusion to the “broadly expanded” upper lip. The specific name of M. uradoi means of Urado in the Kochi Prefecture of Japan, where Kamohara found the holotype at a fish market.

== Species ==
Macrorhamphosodes contains two recognised species:

- Macrorhamphosodes platycheilus Fowler, 1934 (Trumpetsnout spikefish)
- Macrorhamphosodes uradoi (Kamohara, 1933) (Trumpetsnout)

== Characteristics ==
Macrorhamphosodes trumpetsnouts have a flat lower surface to the pelvis, the pelvis tapers to a point to the rear being much broader between the spines of the pelvic fins and at its rear, this feature places the genus in the subfamily Triacanthodinae. They have a highly elongated snout but the length of the snout is less than the length of the head. The mouth is roughly twice as wide as the snoutjust behind it and is twisted to the left or right in larger specimens. The teeth in the lower jaw are flattened and are much wider than they are thick while the upper jaw teeth are thinner and smaller. There are six spines in the dorsal fin but the first three are much larger than the just visible last three. These fishes have maximum published standard lengths of 13 cm (5.1 in) for M. platycheilus and 11.9 cm (4.7 in) for M. uradoi.

== Distribution and habitat ==
Macrorhamphosodes trumpetsnouts are found in the Indo-Pacific region where M platycheilus has been recorded from South Africa, Kenya, the Bay of Bengal and the Philippines; M. uradoi has been recorded from South Africa, Kenya, Taiwan and Japan. They have also both been recorded from Australian waters. These fishes have been collected from depths between 50 and 450 m (160 and 1,480 ft).
