= Johnsonina =

Conservation status
- Least Concern (IUCN 3.1)

Scientific classification
- Kingdom: Animalia
- Phylum: Chordata
- Class: Actinopterygii
- Order: Tetraodontiformes
- Family: Triacanthodidae
- Subfamily: Triacanthodinae
- Genus: Johnsonina; Myers, 1934
- Species: J. eriomma

Binomial name
- Johnsonina eriomma Myers, 1934

Monospecific genus of fish

Johnsonina is a monospecific genus of marine ray-finned fish belonging to the family Triacanthodidae, the spikefishes. The only species in the genus is Johnsonina eriomma, the bullseye spikefish, which is found in the Western Atlantic Ocean.

== Taxonomy ==
Johnsonina was first proposed as a monospecific genus in 1934 by the American ichthyologist George S. Myers when he described its only species Johnsonina eriomma, which he designated as its type species. Myers gave the type locality of J. eriomma as north of Tobago at 18°40'15'N, 60°50'15"W from a depth between 100 and 300 fathoms (600 and 1,800 ft; 180 and 550 m). In 1968 James C. Tyler classified this genus in the nominate subfamily of the family Triacanthodidae, the Triacanthodinae. It is the only species in that subfamily found in the Western Atlantic Ocean. The 5th edition of Fishes of the World classifies the family Triacanthodidae in the suborder Triacanthoidei in the order Tetraodontiformes.

== Etymology ==
Johnsonina suffixes the possessive -ina onto Johnson, honoring the financier Eldridge R. Johnson who sponsored the Johnson-Smithsonian Deep-Sea Expedition of 1933 on which the holotype was collected. The specific name eriomma is a compound of eri, meaning "very", and omma, meaning "eye", an allusion to the large eyes and large eyespot.

== Description ==
Johnsonina has a deep, slightly compressed body with klarge eyes and a small mouth which opens at the front. There is a single series of conical teeth in each jaw. The gill slit is short and vertical positioned before the base of the pectoral fin. The origin of the dorsal fin is to the rear of the top of the gill slit and contains 6 spines The first dorsal fin spine is long and robust, the spines decrease in size to the rear and they can be locked upright. There are typically 15 soft rays, rarely 14 or 15. The anal fin typically has 15, sometimes 14 or 16, branched soft rays, There is a large lockable spine in the pelvic fin. The lower surface of the pelvis has a flat scales covered part which is long and tapering, widest at the front between spines of the pelvic fins. The skin is thick, rough and covered with many small scales, each scale having tiny spines. The color of the head and body is pale pinkish-brown, the upper half with orange -pink marbling, There is a large eye on the rear upper side which has a black centre enclosed in a thin orange ring which is enclosed within a wider white ring. This species reaches a length of 16 cm (6.3 in).

== Distribiution and habitat ==
Johnsonina eriomma is distributed from the Bahamas, south through the Greater and Lesser Antilles, and the western Caribbean off Panama and Nicaragua. It is found at depths between 225 and 720 m (740 and 2,360 ft) over soft substrates.
