= Mephisto (fish) =

Scientific classification
- Kingdom: Animalia
- Phylum: Chordata
- Class: Actinopterygii
- Order: Tetraodontiformes
- Family: Triacanthodidae
- Subfamily: Triacanthodinae
- Genus: Mephisto; Tyler, 1966

Type species
- Mephisto fraserbrunneri Tyler 1966

Genus of fishes

Mephisto is a genus of marine ray-finned fishes belonging to the family Triacanthodidae, the spikefishes. These fishes are found in the Indian Ocean.

== Taxonomy ==
Mephisto was first proposed as a monospecific genus in 1966 by the American ichthyologist James C. Tyler when he described Mephisto fraserbrunneri, which he designated as the type species. When he described M. fraserbrunneri Tyler gave its type locality as the Bay of Bengal at 10°39'N, 97°06'E from a depth of 159 fathoms (954 ft; 291 m). In 1968 James C. Tyler classified this genus in the nominate subfamily of the family Triacanthodidae, the Triacanthodinae. The 5th edition of Fishes of the World classifies the family Triacanthodidae in the suborder Triacanthoidei in the order Tetraodontiformes.

== Etymology ==
Mephisto is the name of a demon, the Mephistopheles of the Faustian tales of German folklore. This name refers to the reddish exterior, black interior and horn-like spikes of the type species.

== Species ==
Mephisto contains two recognised species:

- Mephisto albomaculosus Matsuura, Psomadakis & Tun, 2018
- Mephisto fraserbrunneri Tyler, 1966

== Description ==
Mephisto spikefishes have six spines in the dorsal fin, these gradually decrease in size from the front to the rear but the rearmost spine is still clearly visible. They have a snout which is shorter than the length of the remainder of the head and which is nearly equal to the between the eye and the upper end of the gill slit. They have a single row of large and conical teeth in each jaw. These fishes have the longest gill slts of their family, the lower margin of the slit reaches slightly below the lower margin of the lobe at the base of the pectoral fin. M. albomaculosus is knowm from its holotype which had a standard length of 94.4 mm (3.72 in), while M. fraserbrunneri has a maximum published standard length of 105.8 mm (4.17 in).

== Distribution and habitat ==
Mephisto spikefishes have been recorded from the Indian Ocean from off Somalia east to off Myanmar at depths between 74 and 446 m (243 and 1,463 ft).
