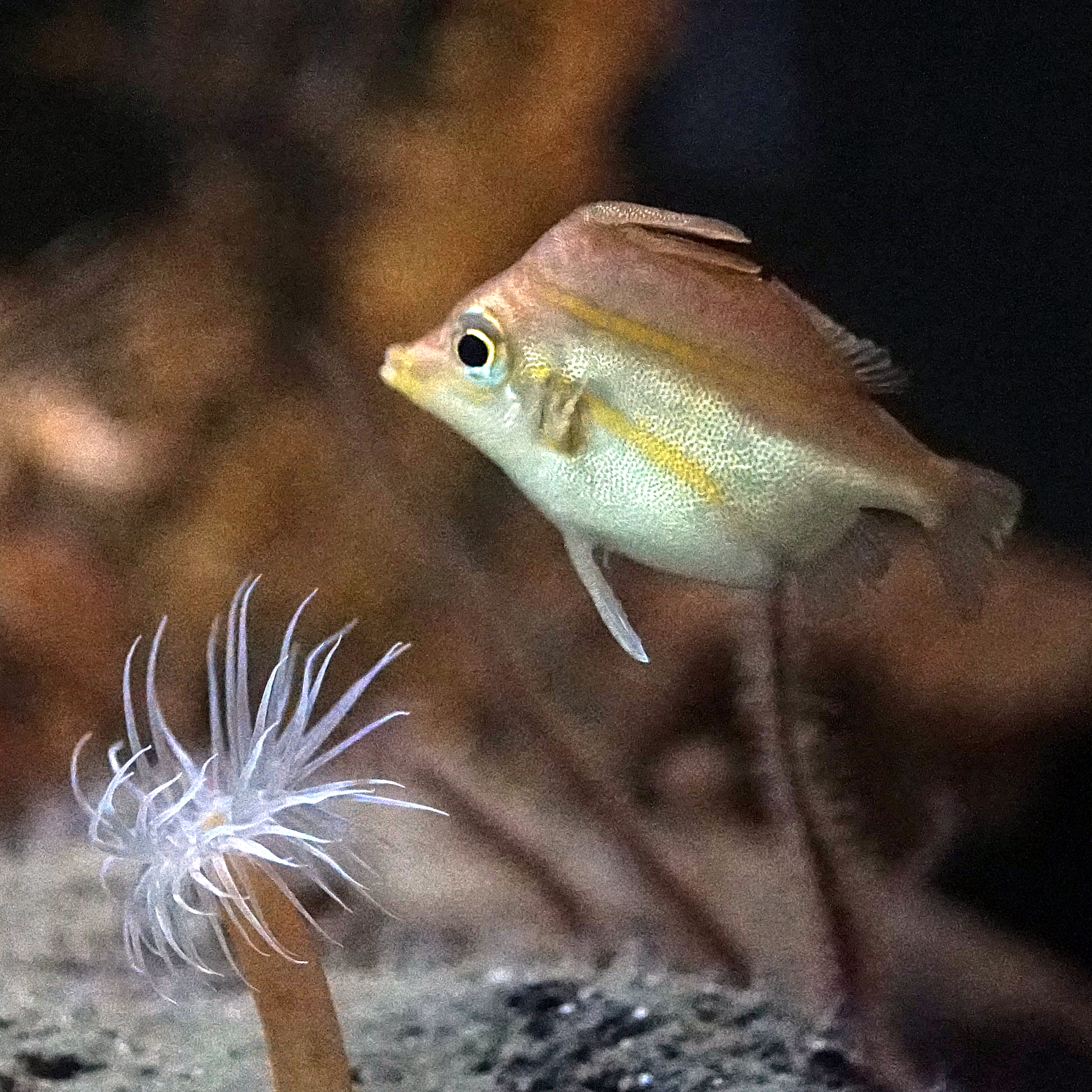

Scientific classification
- Kingdom: Animalia
- Phylum: Chordata
- Class: Actinopterygii
- Order: Tetraodontiformes
- Family: Triacanthodidae
- Genus: Triacanthodes
- Species: T. anomalus

Binomial name
- Triacanthodes anomalus (Temminck & Schlegel, 1850)

Synonyms
- Triacanthus anomalus Temminck & Schlegel, 1850

= Triacanthodes anomalus =

Species of fish

Triacanthodes anomalus, the red spikefish, is a species of marine ray-finned fish belonging to the family Triacanthodidae, the spikefishes. This species is found in the Northwestern Pacific Ocean.

== Taxonomy ==
Triacanthodes anomalus was first formally described as Tricanthus anomalus in 1850 by Coenraad Jacob Temminck and Hermann Schlegel, with its type locality given as the entrance to Ōmura Bay in Nagasaki, Japan. In 1857, Pieter Bleeker proposed the new monospecific genus Triacanthodes for T. anomalus and designated this species as its type species. This genus is the type genus of the family Triacanthodidae and of the subfamily Triacanthodinae. The fifth edition of Fishes of the World classifies the family Triacanthodidae in the suborder Triacanthoidei in the order Tetraodontiformes.

== Etymology ==
Triacanthodes anomalus is classified in the genus Triacanthodes, a name which suffixes -odes, meaning "having the form of", onto Triacanthus, as it was thought that this genus was closely related to Triacanthus. The specific name, anomalus, means "odd" or "irregular", Temminck and Schlegel said that this species was "not quite modelled on the type" (n'est-pas tout-à-fait modelé sur la même type) when compared to other species in the genus Triacanthus.

== Description ==
Triacanthodes anomalus has a snout which is equal to or a little less in length than the diameter of the eye. The area between the eyes is thin, and is straight or slightly humped. The dorsal profile of the head between the mouth and the origin of the dorsal fin is straight. The large gill slet extends to below the lower margin of the pectoral fin base. There are two clear yellow stripes in life, one running from above the eye to end of the base of the soft rayed part of the dorsal fin and the other extends from the middle of the eye over the base of the pectoral fin the origin of the anal fin. This species has a maximum standard length of 10 cm (3.9 in).

== Distribution and habitat ==
Triacanthodes anomalus are demersal fish (ground fish) that inhabit the tropical marine waters of the South and East China Seas around Taiwan, the Japanese archipelago, and South Korea. The species is found on the continental shelf and edge of the shelf in areas with sandy or sandy mud substrates.
