= Cryptobalistes =

Cryptobalistes Temporal range: Early Oligocene

Scientific classification
- Kingdom: Animalia
- Phylum: Chordata
- Class: Actinopterygii
- Order: Tetraodontiformes
- Family: Triacanthidae
- Genus: †Cryptobalistes; Tyler, 1968
- Species: †C. brevis

Binomial name
- †Cryptobalistes brevis (Rath, 1859)

Synonyms
- †Acanthopleurus brevis Rath, 1859

Extinct genus of fishes

Cryptobalistes is an extinct genus of triplespine that lived during the early Oligocene epoch. It contains a single species, C. brevis that inhabited the seas around what is now Canton Glarus, Switzerland. Fossils are known from the Matt Formation. It is thought to be closely allied with another triplespine from Glarus, Acanthopleurus. Cryptobalistes, Acanthopleurus, and Protacanthodes are thought to be basal members of the Triacanthidae.

== See also ==
- Prehistoric fish
- List of prehistoric bony fish
