= Trixiphichthys =

Scientific classification
- Kingdom: Animalia
- Phylum: Chordata
- Class: Actinopterygii
- Order: Tetraodontiformes
- Family: Triacanthidae
- Genus: Trixiphichthys; Fraser-Brunner, 1941
- Species: T. weberi

Binomial name
- Trixiphichthys weberi (B. L. Chaudhuri, 1910)

Synonyms
- Triacanthus weberi Chaudhuri, 1910

Genus of fishes

Trixiphichthys, is a monospecific genus of marine ray-finned fish belonging to the family Triacanthidae, the triplespines or tripodfishes. The only species in this genus is Trixiphichthys weberi, the blacktip tripodfish or longnosed tripodfish. This taxon is found in the Indo-West Pacific region.

== Taxonomy ==
Trixiphichthys was first proposed as a monospecific genus in 1941 by the British ichthyologist Alec Fraser-Brunner with Triacanthus weberi designated as its type species. T. weberi was first formally described in 1910 by Banawari Lal Chaudhuri with its type locality given as Gopalpur, Odisha. This genus is classified within the family Triacanthida and, in 1968, James C. Tyler classified this family within the suborder Triacanthoidei alongside the Triacanthodidae. The fifth edition of Fishes of the World classifies the Triacanthoidei as a suborder of the order Tetraodontiformes.

== Etymology ==
Trixiphichthys, the genus name, is derived from the word xiphos, meaning "sword", and prefixes it with tri-, meaning "three" and suffixes it with -ichthys, the Greek word for fish. Fraser-Brunner did not explain what this alluded to but it is presumed to allude to the large first spine on the dorsal fin and the two large pelvic fin spines. The specific name honours the German-born Dutch ichthyologist Max Carl Wilhelm Weber, who helped Chaudhuri with notes in his original description.

== Description ==
Trixiphichthys has the scaly ventral surface of the pelvis which is wider to the front and tapers to a distinct point. The distance between the eye to the upper end of the gill cover is short, just greater than the duiameter of the eye. It has a long snout which has aclear concave dorsal profile and is slightly compressed. The lower thisr of the first dorsal fin spine is paler than the upper two thirds. This species has a maximum total length of 30 cm (12 in)>

== Distribution and habitat ==
Trixiphichthys is found in the eastern Indian Ocean and western Pacific Ocean in the Bay of Bengal, the South China Sea, the Gulf of Thailand and Indonesia. They are found at depths down to 65 m (213 ft) over san and mud flats in coastal waters.
