= Matt Formation =

Geologic formation in Switzerland

- Stratigraphic range: Early Oligocene, 33–28 Ma
- Type: Formation
- Unit of: North Helvetic Flysch
- Underlies: Blattengrat Nappe, Wildflysch Nappe
- Overlies: Elm Formation

Lithology
- Primary: Slate, sandstone

Location
- Region: Canton Glarus
- Country: Switzerland

Type section
- Named for: Matt, Switzerland
- Named by: Siegenthaler, 1974

The Matt Formation is an Early Oligocene-aged marine geological formation that outcrops in the Glarus Alps of the Canton of Glarus, Switzerland. It is most notable for its fossiliferous slates found near Engi, known as the Engi slates, Glarner Schiefer (Glarus Slate) or Glarner Fischschiefer ("Glarus fish slate"), which contain the well-preserved fossils of fishes, birds, and sea turtles. The metamorphization of the rock has led to many of the fossils appearing somewhat distorted.

== Geology ==
The Matt Formation is divided into two sections: a lower member of turbiditic sandstones (Matt Sandstones) and the upper Engi Slates, which contain the famous fossil fishes. As with other formations along the Glarus thrust, deformation along the fault has caused the Matt Formation to be overlain by older Eocene and Late Cretaceous-aged marls and limestones of the Blattengrat and Wildflysch nappes.

== Paleobiota ==
The fossil fishes of Glarus were among the earliest known to Western science. Although the slates from Engi mines have been mined since the mid-16th century, the first description of its fossil fishes was by Johann Jakob Scheuchzer in 1705. Scheuchzer's writings prompted a flourishing trade in the fossil fishes of Glarus, which had been sent to museums all around Europe throughout the 18th century. Many of these fishes were described with Linnean taxonomy for the first time in the early 19th century by Europe's pioneering paleontologists, including Henri Marie Ducrotay de Blainville and Louis Agassiz.

The Glarus slate is consistent with a marine environment in the western Paratethys Sea. The Alpine orogeny uplifted these former marine fossils far above sea level, where they are exposed today.

The paleobiota of the Glarus Slate shows close affinities with that of the Rauenberg Lagerstätte of Germany and early Oligocene formations of the Romanian Carpathians and the Caucasus Mountains. All of these localities were formerly part of the Paratethys Sea.

=== Bony fish ===
Primarily based on Woodward (1901), with taxonomic changes:

Genus	Species	Notes	Images
Acanthopleurus	A. collettei	A triplespine.	
Acanthopleurus	A. serratus	A triplespine.	
Anenchelum	A. glarisianum (=Lepidopus glarisianus)	A cutlassfish.	
Archaeus	A. glarisianus	A jackfish.	
Balistomorphus	B. orbiculatus	A triggerfish.	
Balistomorphus	B. ovalis	A triggerfish.	
Balistomorphus	B. spinosus	A triggerfish.	
"Clupea"	"C." scheuchzeri	A herring.	
Cryptobalistes	C. brevis	A triplespine.	
Cyttoides	C. glaronensis	A cyttid dory.	
Fistularia	F. koenigi	A cornetfish.	
Glarithurus	G. friedmani	A larval surgeonfish.	
Homorhynchus	H. colei	A palaeorhynchid billfish.	
Isurichthys	I. macrurus	An ariommatid.	
Opisthomyzon	O. glaronensis	An early remora.	
Palaeorhynchus	P. glarisianus	A palaeorhynchid billfish.	
Palaeorhynchus	P. longirostris	A palaeorhynchid billfish.	
Palaeogadus	P. troscheli	A hake.	
Palimphyes	P. elongatus	A euzaphlegid scombroid.	
Podocys	P. minutus	A percoid.	
Pristigenys (=Acanus)	P. spinosus	A bigeye.	
Pristigenys (=Acanus)	P. regleysianus	A bigeye.	
Protosiganus (=Archaeoteuthis)	P. glaronensis	A relative of rabbitfish.	
Scopeloides	S. glarisianus	A bristlemouth.	
Thyrsitocephalus	T. alpinus	A gempylid.	

=== Reptiles ===
Genus	Species	Notes	Images
Glarichelys	G. knorri	A sea turtle.	

=== Birds ===
Genus	Species	Notes	Images
Protornis	P. glarniensis	A coraciiform of uncertain affinities.	
Trogoniformes indet.		A relative of trogons.	
