= Tydemania navigatoris =

Scientific classification
- Kingdom: Animalia
- Phylum: Chordata
- Class: Actinopterygii
- Order: Tetraodontiformes
- Family: Triacanthodidae
- Genus: Tydemania; M. C. W. Weber, 1913
- Species: T. navigatoris

Binomial name
- Tydemania navigatoris M. C. W. Weber, 1913

Species of fish

Tydemania navigatoris, the fleshy-lipped spikefish, is a species of marine ray-finned fish belonging to the family Triacanthodidae, the spikefishes. This species is found in the Indian and Pacific Oceans where it occurs at depths of from 50 to 607 metres (160 to 1,990 ft). This species grows to a length of 12 centimetres (4.7 in) SL. This fish is specialized to feed on the scales of other fishes. This species is the only known member of the genus Tydemania.

== Taxonomy ==
Tydemania navigatoris was first formally described in 1913 by the German-born Dutch zoologist and biogeographer Max Carl Wilhelm Weber, with its type locality given as Madura Sea at 7°15'S, 115°15.6'E, Siboga station 12, from a depth of 289 m (948 ft). When Weber described this species, he proposed the new monospecific genus Tydemania for it. This taxon is classified in the family Triacanthodidae and of the subfamily Triacanthodinae. The 5th edition of Fishes of the World classifies the family Triacanthodidae in the suborder Triacanthoidei in the order Tetraodontiformes.

== Etymology ==
Tydemania navigatoris is the only species in the monotypic genus Tydemania; this name suffixes -ia, meaning "of" or "belonging to", to the surname of Lieutenant Gustaaf Frederik Tydeman who was captain of the Dutch research vessel Siboga, from which the holotype was collected. The specific name, navigatoris, means "sailor" or "mariner", an allusion Weber did not explain but it may be a reference to Tydeman's occupation.

== Description ==
Tydemania navigatoris has its dorsal fin supported by 6 spines and between 13 and 15 soft rays. The first 3 spines are well developed but the last 3 are highly reduced and are just visible. The anal fin has between 12 and 14 soft rays while the pelvic fins have a single spine and may have a single soft ray. The snout is shorter than the remainder of the head and the lips are thick, swollen and fleshy. The teeth are compressed from the front to the back, broad and flattened towards the tip with a single row in each jaw. The gill slit extends to the lower half of the base of the pectoral fin. The pelvis has a scaly ventral surface which tapers to a point towards the tail and between the pelvic fin spines it is around four times as wide as the length of the pelvic fin base. The overall colour is typically a uniform red, but some specimens from Japan have a blue strip running along the body from above the eye to halfway along the body. This species has a maximum published standard length of 12 cm (4.7 in).

== Distribution and habitat ==
Tydemania navigatoris has an Indo-West Pacific distribution and it has been recorded to be found in East Africa, the Bay of Bengal, Japan, China, Philippines, Indonesia, and Australia. This is a demersal fish which is found at depths between 50 and 607 m (164 and 1,991 ft).
