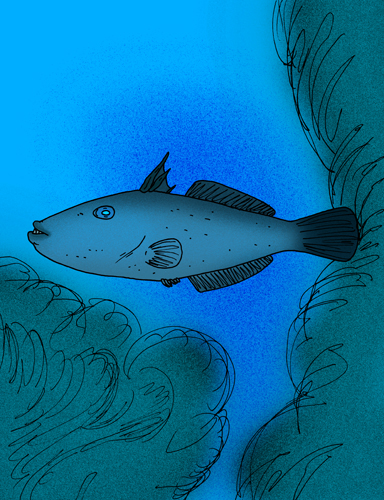
- Restoration of B. ovalis

Scientific classification
- Kingdom: Animalia
- Phylum: Chordata
- Class: Actinopterygii
- Order: Tetraodontiformes
- Family: Balistidae
- Genus: †Balistomorphus; Gill, 1888

Species
- B. orbiculatus (Heer, 1865); B. ovalis (Agassiz, 1842); B. spinosus (Agassiz, 1842)

Synonyms
- †Acanthoderma Agassiz, 1842

= Balistomorphus =

Balistomorphus Temporal range: Early Oligocene

Extinct genus of fishes

Balistomorphus is an extinct genus of prehistoric triggerfish during the early Oligocene epoch in what is now Canton Glarus, Switzerland, where fossils are known from the Matt Formation. It inhabited the marine environment of the Paratethys.

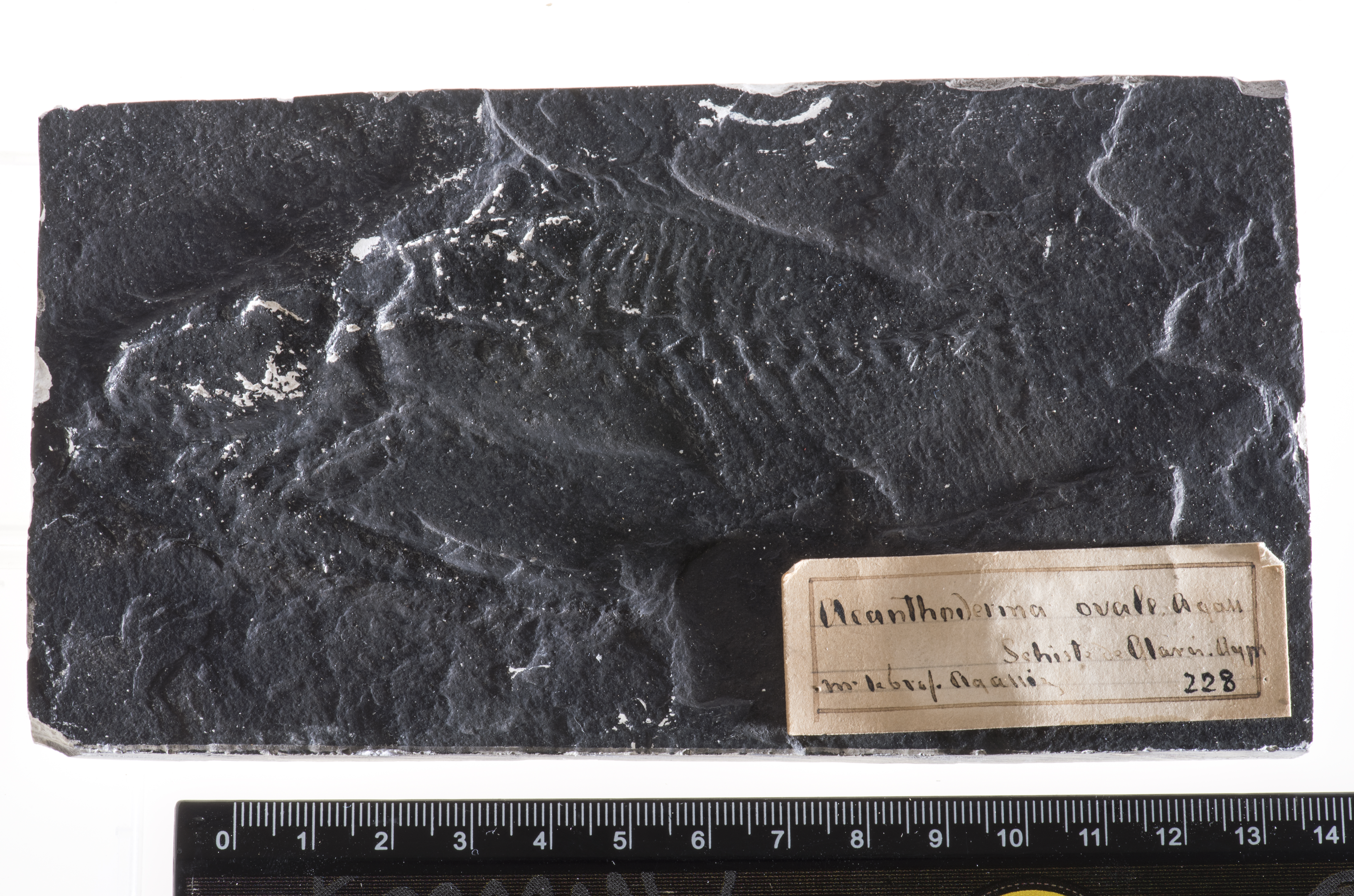
Fossil of B. ovalis, Natural History Museum of Neuchâtel

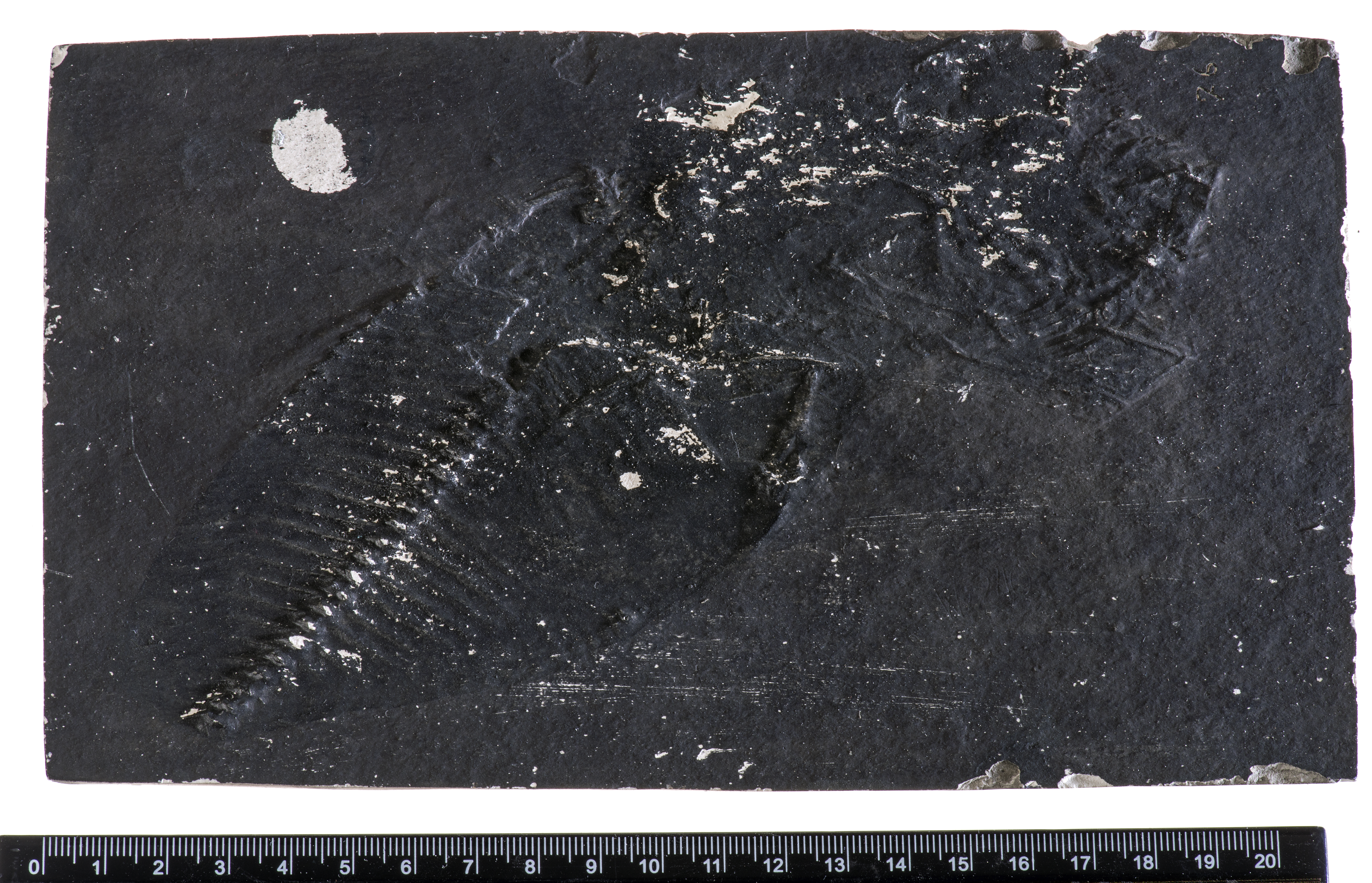
Fossil of B. cf. spinosus, Natural History Museum of Neuchatel

The following species are known. All were formerly placed in the preoccupied genus Acanthoderma:

- B. orbiculatus (Heer, 1865)
- B. ovalis (Agassiz, 1842)
- B. spinosus (Agassiz, 1842)

Woodward (1901) considered all species synonymous with B. spinosus, but later studies have retained them all as distinct.

== See also ==
- Prehistoric fish
- List of prehistoric bony fish
