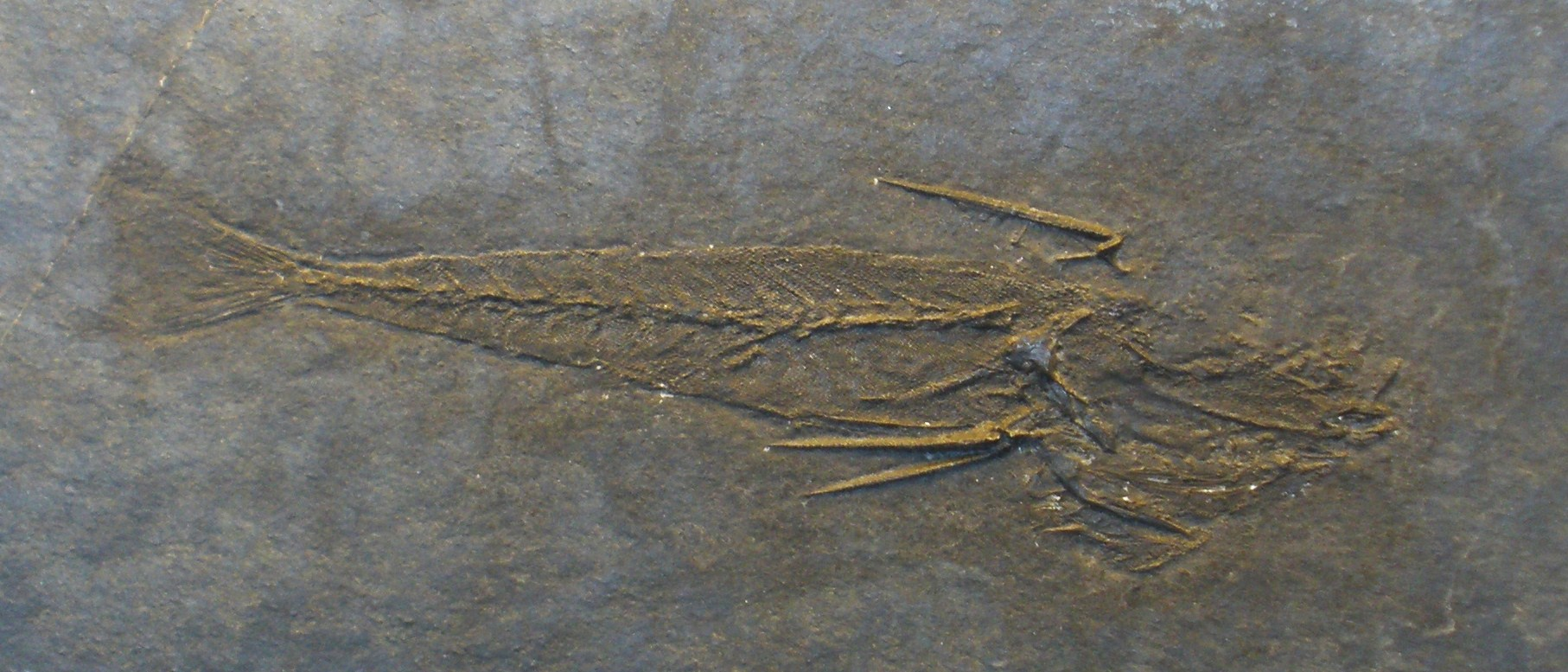
- A. serratus

Scientific classification
- Kingdom: Animalia
- Phylum: Chordata
- Class: Actinopterygii
- Order: Tetraodontiformes
- Family: Triacanthidae
- Subfamily: Triacanthinae
- Genus: †Acanthopleurus; Agassiz, 1844

Species
- †A. collettei Tyler, 1980; †A. serratus Agassiz, 1844; †A. trispinosus (Ciobanu, 1977)

= Acanthopleurus =

Acanthopleurus Temporal range: Early Oligocene

Extinct genus of fishes

Acanthopleurus is an extinct genus of marine triplespine that lived in the seas over what is now Europe during the early Oligocene epoch.

It contains three species:

- †A. collettei Tyler, 1980 - Oligocene of Switzerland (Matt Formation)
- †A. serratus Agassiz, 1844 - Oligocene of Switzerland (Matt Formation) (type species)
- †A. trispinosus (Ciobanu, 1977) - Oligocene of Romania (=Cephalacanthus trispinosus Ciobanu, 1977)

The former species A. brevis Rath, 1859 is now classified in its own genus, Cryptobalistes.

== See also ==
- Prehistoric fish
- List of prehistoric bony fish
