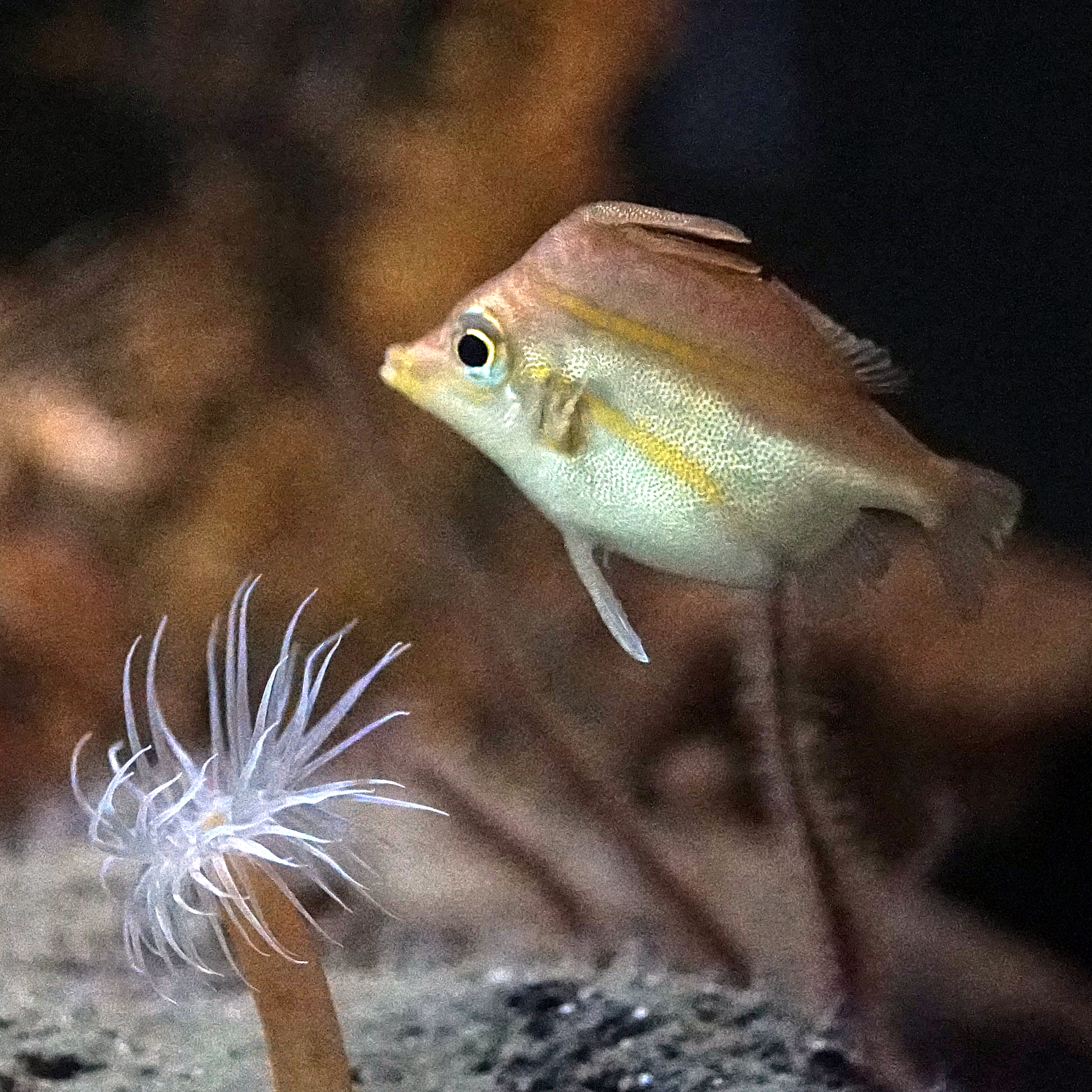
- Triacanthodes anomalus

Scientific classification
- Kingdom: Animalia
- Phylum: Chordata
- Class: Actinopterygii
- Order: Tetraodontiformes
- Family: Triacanthodidae
- Subfamily: Triacanthodinae
- Genus: Triacanthodes; Bleeker, 1857

Type species
- Triacanthus anomalus Temminck & Schlegel, 1850

= Triacanthodes =

Genus of fishes

Triacanthodes is a genus of marine ray-finned fishes belonging to the family Triacanthodidae, the spikefishes. These fishes are found in the Indian and Pacific Oceans.

== Taxonomy ==
Triacanthodes was first proposed as a monospecific genus in 1857 by the Dutch physician, herpetologist and ichthyologist Pieter Bleeker, with Triacanthus anomalus designated as its type species. T. anomalus was first formally described in 1850 by Coenraad Jacob Temminck and Hermann Schlegel, who gave its type locality as the entrance to Ōmura Bay in Nagasaki, Japan. It is the type genus of the subfamily Triacanthodinae and of the family Triacanthodidae. The subfamily Triacanthodinae was proposed in 1968 by James C. Tyler. The fifth edition of Fishes of the World classifies the family Triacanthodidae in the suborder Triacanthoidei in the order Tetraodontiformes.

== Etymology ==
Triacanthodes suffixes -odes, meaning "having the form of", onto Triacanthus, as it was thought that this genus was closely related to Triacanthus.

== Species ==
Triacanthodes currently includes 4 recognised species:

- Triacanthodes anomalus (Temminck & Schlegel, 1850) (red spikefish)
- Triacanthodes ethiops Alcock, 1894 (shortsnout spikefish)
- Triacanthodes indicus Matsuura, 1982
- Triacanthodes intermedius Matsuura & Fourmanoir, 1984

== Characteristics ==
Triacanthodes spikefishes the spines in the dorsal fin which become slightly shorter from the front to the back. The snout is shorter than the length of the remainder of the head and there are large conical teeth in the jaws arranged in a single series but with up to six additional inner teeth. The ventral surface of the pelvis is covered in scales and tapers to a point at its rear. The width of the pelvis between the pelvic fins is between 3 and 5 times that of the length of the pelvic fins. These are small fishes, the largest species is T. anomalus with a maximum published standard length of 10 cm (3.9 in).

== Distribution ==
Triacanthodes spikefishes are found in the Pacific and Indian Oceans where they range from the Western Indian Ocean off East Africa east to the western Pacific Ocean around Australia and New Caledonia, north to Japan and Korea.
