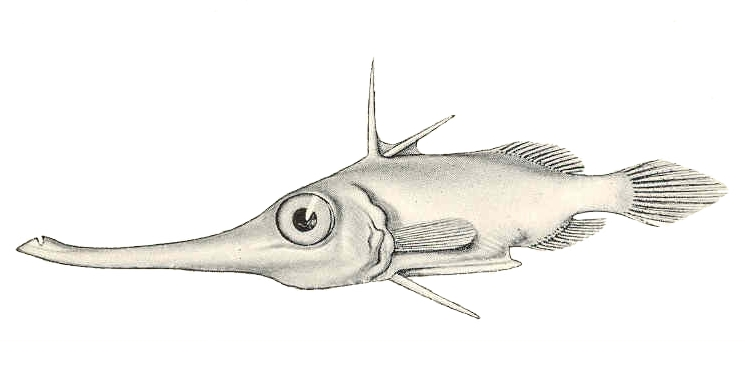
- Halimochirurgus centriscoides

Scientific classification
- Kingdom: Animalia
- Phylum: Chordata
- Class: Actinopterygii
- Order: Tetraodontiformes
- Family: Triacanthodidae
- Subfamily: Triacanthodinae
- Genus: Halimochirurgus; Alcock, 1899

Type species
- Halimochirurgus centriscoides Alcock, 1899

= Halimochirurgus =

Genus of fishes

Halimochirurgus is a genus of marine ray-finned fishes belonging to the family Triacanthodidae, the spikefishes. The fishes in this genus are found in the deep waters of the Indian and Pacific Oceans.

== Taxonomy ==
Halimochirurgus was first proposed as a monospecific genus in 1899 by the British physician, naturalist, and carcinologist Alfred William Alcock with Halimochirurgus centriscoides designated as its type species, and its only species. H. centriscoides was also described by Alcock in 1899 and its type locality given as the Gulf of Mannar to the west of Sri Lanka at 7°15'N, 77°46'E from a depth of 143 fathoms (858 ft; 262 m). In 1913 Max Carl Wilhelm Weber described a second species in the genus, H. alcocki, giving its type locality as the Arafura Sea at 5°48.2'S, 132°13'W. In 1968, James C. Tyler classified this genus in the nominate subfamily of the family Triacanthodidae, the Triacanthodinae. The 5th edition of Fishes of the World classifies the family Triacanthodidae in the suborder Triacanthoidei in the order Tetraodontiformes.

== Etymology ==
Halimochirurgus combines ''halimos, meaning "of the sea", with chirurgus, which means "surgeon", a reference to the tube like snout having a resemblance to a catheter, a surgical instrument. The specific name of H. centriscoides means of the form of Centriscus, a genus of shrimpfish. The specific name of H. alcocki honours Alcock.

== Species ==
Halimochirurgus contains two recognised species:

- Halimochirurgus alcocki M. C. W. Weber, 1913
- Halimochirurgus centriscoides Alcock, 1899 (Longsnout spikefish)

== Characteritsics ==
Halimochirurgus spikefishes have a flat lower surface to the pelvis, the pelvis tapers to a point to the rear being much broader between the spines of the pelvic fins and at its rear, this feature places the genus in the subfamily Triacanthodinae. They have an extremely elongated snout, although the length of the snout is always less than the length of the remainder of the head. The mouth is not wider than the width of the snout immediately behind it and is not twisted to one side, The small, barely visible teeth are conical. H. alcocki has a maximum published standard length of 21.6 cm (8.5 in) while H. centriscoides has a maximum published total length of 15 cm (5.9 in).

== Distribution and habitat ==
Halimochirurgus spikefishes are found in the Indian and Pacific Oceans. H. alcocki has been recorded from the Arabian Sea, Japan, Mariana Islands, Australia and New Caledonia. H. centriscoides has been found in the Arabian Sea and off Australia. These fishes are bathydemersal found in deep waters at depths between 262 and 610 m (860 and 2,001 ft).
