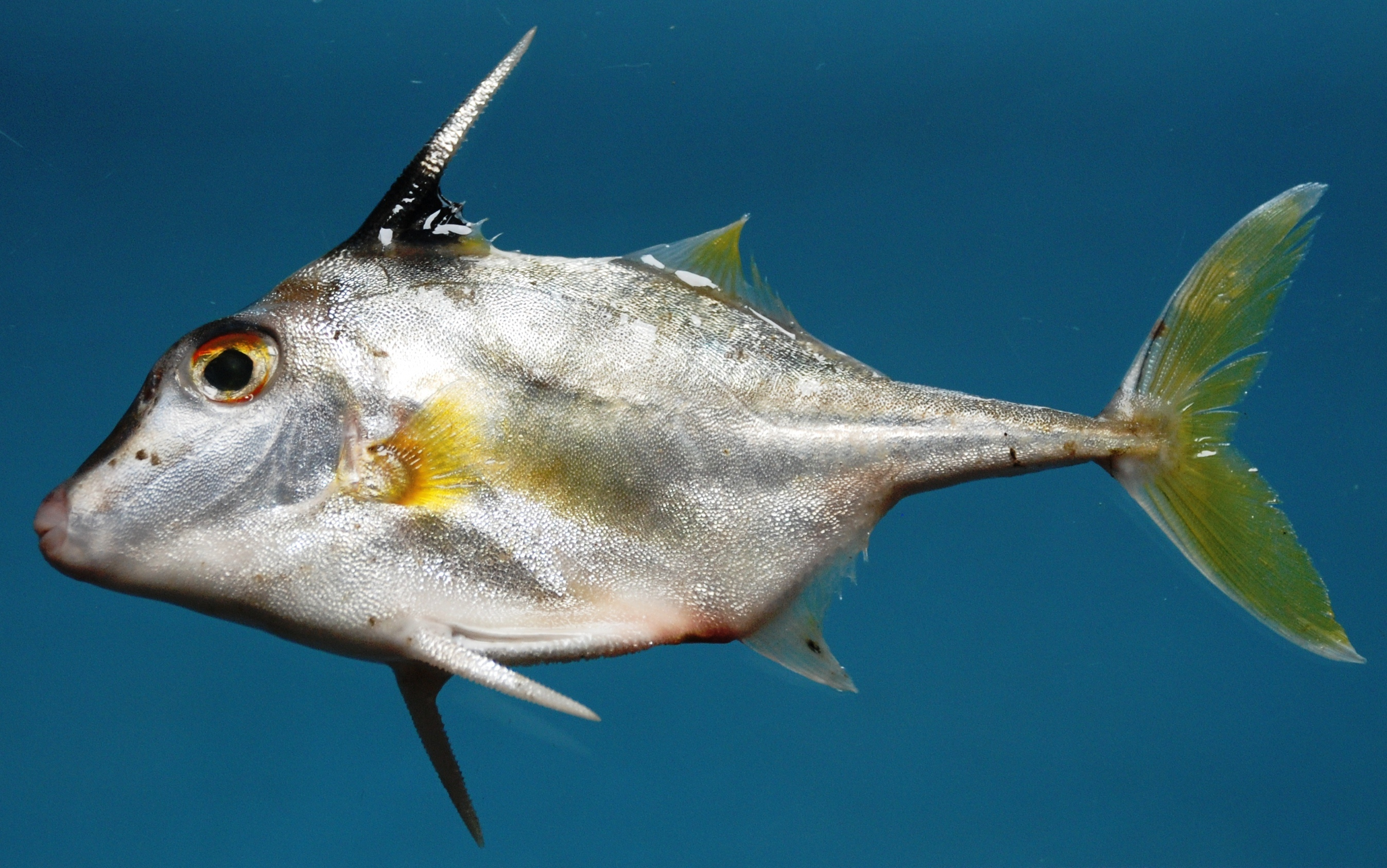
- Short-nosed tripodfish (Triacanthus biaculeatus)

Scientific classification
- Kingdom: Animalia
- Phylum: Chordata
- Class: Actinopterygii
- Division: Teleostei
- Order: Tetraodontiformes
- Family: Triacanthidae; Bleeker, 1859

Genera
- see text

= Triacanthidae =

Triacanthidae Temporal range: Eocene–Recent

Family of fishes

Triacanthidae (from Ancient Greek τρι- (tri-), meaning "three", and ἄκανθα (ákantha), meaning "spine") known as the triplespines or tripodfishes, is a family of marine ray-finned fishes belonging to the order Tetraodontiformes, which also includes the pufferfishes, boxfishes, filefishes and related groups. The family is made up of four extant genera and three extinct genera which are known from fossils.

== Taxonomy ==
Triacanthidae was first proposed as a family in 1859 by the Dutch physician, herpetologist and ichthyologist Pieter Bleeker, and, in 1968, James C. Tyler classified it within the suborder Triacanthoidei alongside the Triacanthodidae. The 5th edition of Fishes of the World classifies this as suborder of the order Tetraodontiformes.

== Genera ==
Triacanthidae contains the following extant genera:

Genus	Species	Image
Pseudotriacanthus Fraser-Brunner, 1941	Pseudotriacanthus strigilifer	
Triacanthus Oken, 1817	Triacanthus biaculeatus; Triacanthus nieuhofii	
Tripodichthys Tyler, 1968	Tripodichthys angustifrons; Tripodichthys blochii; Tripodichthys oxycephalus	
Trixiphichthys Fraser-Brunner, 1941	Trixiphichthys weberi	

== Characteristics ==
Triacanthidae triplespines's, like their relatives the triggerfishes and the filefishes first ray of the dorsal fin is formed to a spine. Further, they have two spines in place of their ventral fins. They have sharp and heavy teeth, which they use to eat hard-shelled molluscs and crustaceans.

Not much is known about how the fish live. They are essentially offshore fish that only come close to land occasionally. They range from 15 to 30 centimetres (5.9 to 11.8 in) in length.

== Fossil record ==
The genus Acanthopleurus is known from the species A. serratus Agassiz, 1844 and A. collettei Tyler, 1980 of the Oligocene of Glarus canton, Switzerland. A third described species Cephalacanthus trispinosus Ciobanu, 1977 from the Oligocene of Romania, formerly in the family Dactylopteridae, has been considered to be a juvenile specimen of Acanthopleurus, though whether it belongs with one of the two described species or a new species is not yet determined. Other fossil triplespine genera include Cryptobalistes, also from Glarus, as well as Protacanthodes from Monte Bolca, Italy.
