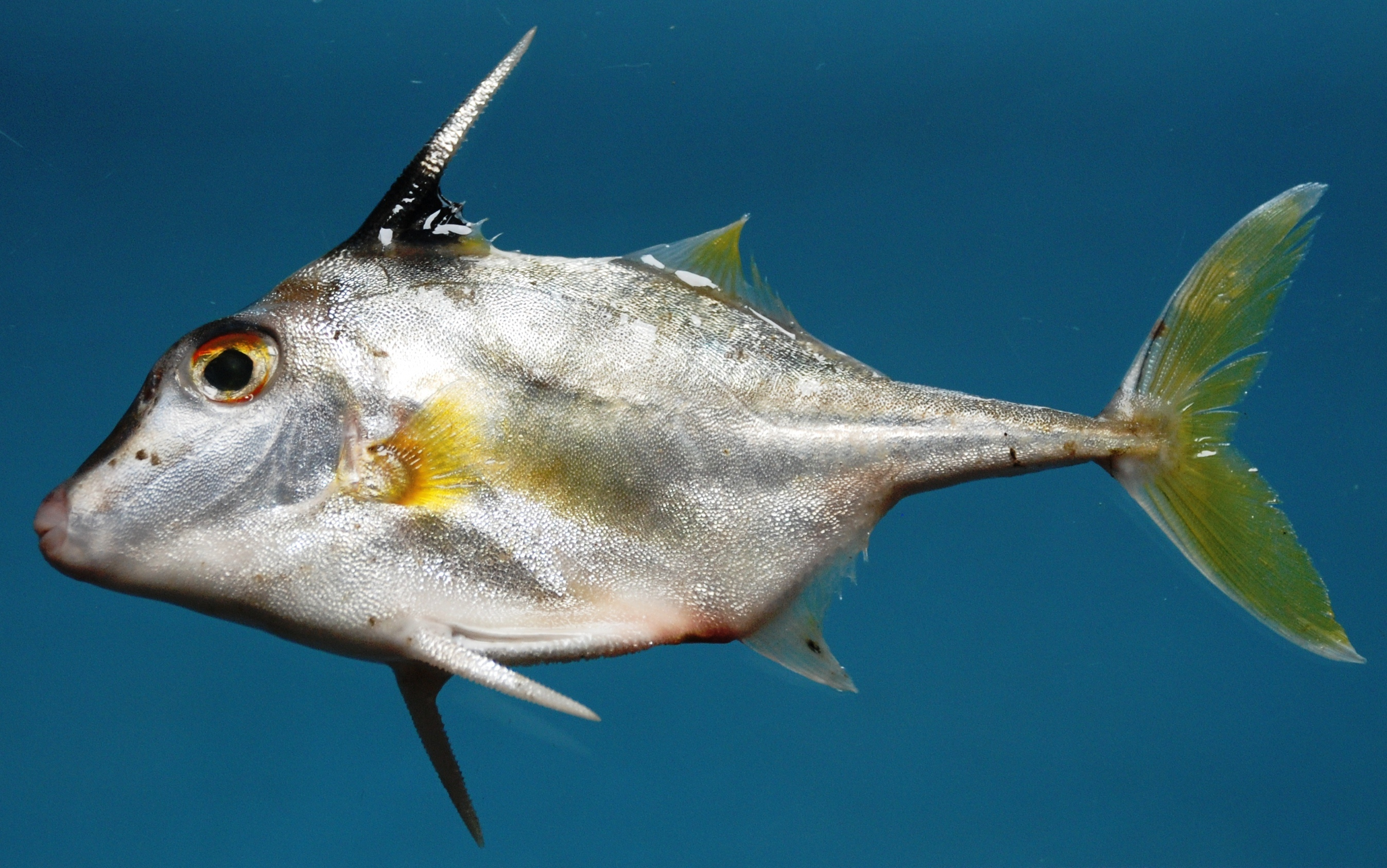

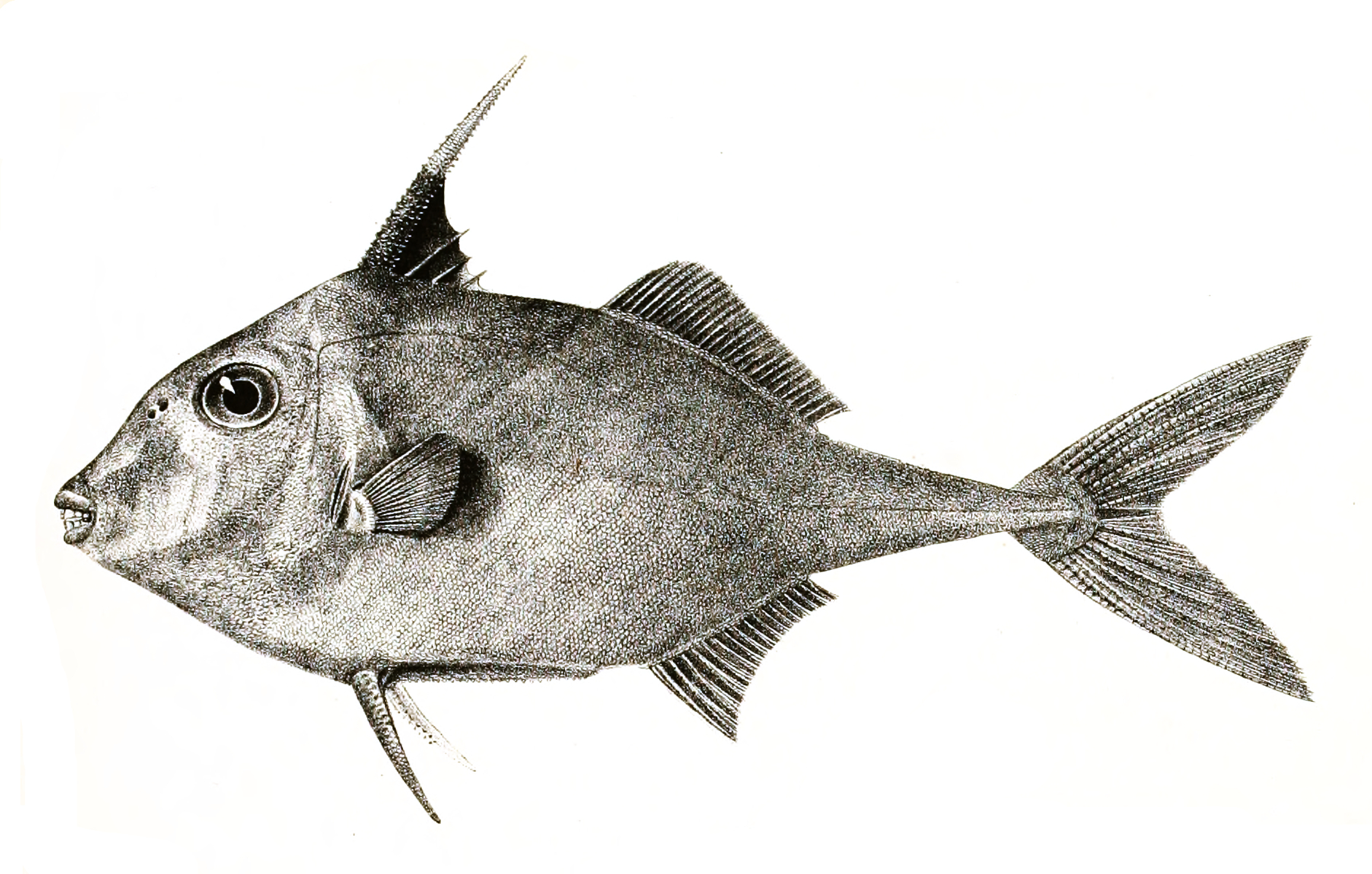

Scientific classification
- Kingdom: Animalia
- Phylum: Chordata
- Class: Actinopterygii
- Order: Tetraodontiformes
- Family: Triacanthidae
- Genus: Triacanthus
- Species: T. biaculeatus

Binomial name
- Triacanthus biaculeatus (Bloch, 1786)

Synonyms
- Balistes biaculeatus Bloch, 1786; Triacanthus brevirostris Temminck & Schlegel, 1850

= Triacanthus biaculeatus =

Species of fish

Triacanthus biaculeatus, also known as the short-nosed tripod fish, black-finned triple-spine, blacktail tripodfish, hollow-snouted tripodfish or silver tripodfish, is a species of marine ray-finned fish belonging to the family Triacanthidae, the triplespines or tripodfishes. This species is found in the Indo-West Pacific region.

== Taxonomy ==
Triacanthus biaculeatus was first formally described as Balistes biaculeatus in 1786 by the German physician and naturalist Marcus Elieser Bloch with its type locality given as the Indian Ocean. In 1817 Lorenz Oken classified B. aculeatus in the new monospecific genus Triacanthus, so this species is the type species of the genus Triacanthus by monotypy. This genus is classified in the family Triacanthidae within the suborder Triacanthoidei alongside the Triacanthodidae. The 5th edition of Fishes of the World classifies the Triacanthoidei as suborder of the order Tetraodontiformes.

== Etymology ==
Triacanthus biaculeatus is classified within the genus Triacanthus, a name that prefixes acanthus, which means “thorn” or “spine”, with tri-, meaning “three”, this is an allusion to the long and robust first spine of the dorsal fin and the two large spines in the pelvic fins. The specific name, biaculeatus, means "two spined", an allusion to the spine in each of the pelvic fins.

== Description ==
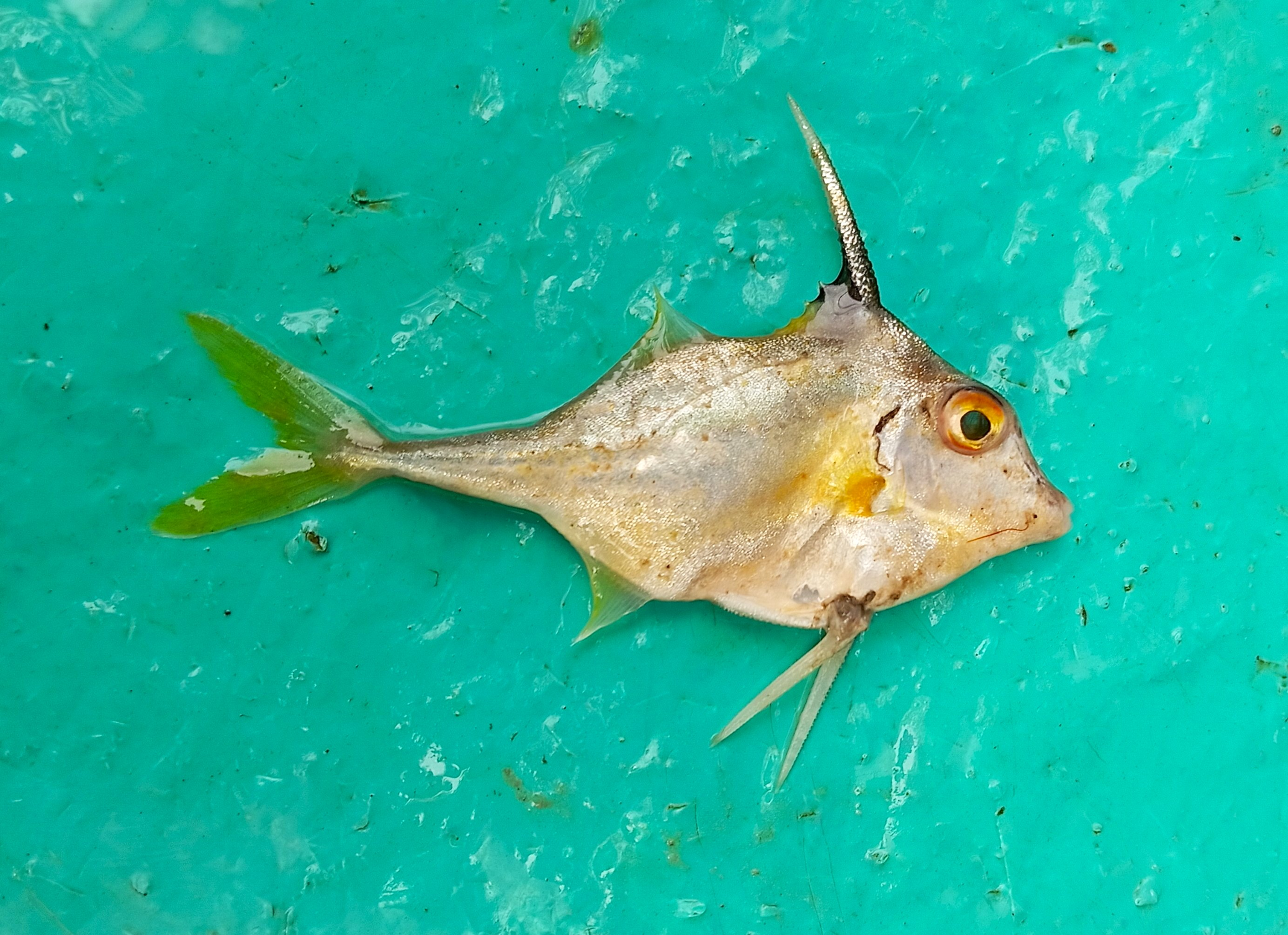
Silver tripodfish (Triacanthus biaculeatus), West Bengal, India

Triacanthus biaculeatus has a lower, scaly surface of the pelvis that is nearly as wide at the front as it is at the rear and which does not taper to a point. There are six spines in the dorsal fin, the first spine being between three and four times longer than the second spine. There are 21 to 26 soft rays in the dorsal fin and 17 to 23 in the anal fin. The scales have low emarginated cross-shaped ridges. The upper part of the body is sivery bluish-grey with the lower hal;f being silvery-grey. There is a large blotch on the back underneath the spiny dorsal fin. There is a dark bat running from one eye to the other. The membranes of the fins are typically yellowish, except that the spint dorsal fin has varying amounts of dark, even black, colouration. This species has a maximum published total length of 30 cm (12 in).

== Distribution and habitat ==
Triacanthus biaculeatus is found in the Indian Ocean and the Western Pacific Ocean where it has been recorded from the Persian Gulf, Gulf of Oman and the Arabian Sea east into the Pacific as far as northern Australia and north to central Honshu in Japan. The short-nosed tripod fish is found on sand or mud flats along coasts and in estuaries as deep as 60 m (200 ft) where it feeds on benthic invertebrates.

== Human utilisation ==
Triacanthus biaculeatus is sold in fish markets as fresh fish and is used in traditional Chinese medicine.
