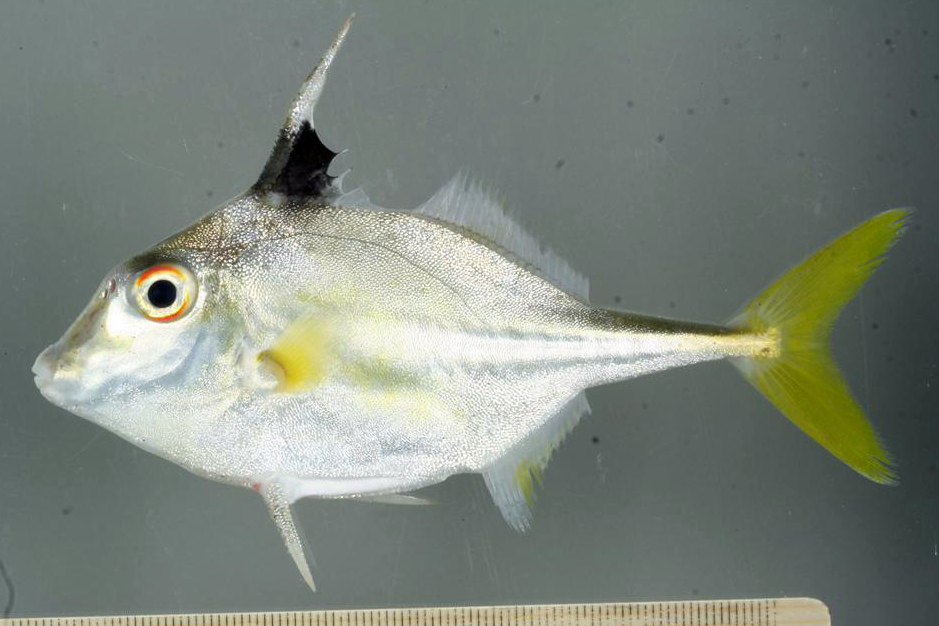
- T. nieuhofii

Scientific classification
- Kingdom: Animalia
- Phylum: Chordata
- Class: Actinopterygii
- Division: Teleostei
- Order: Tetraodontiformes
- Family: Triacanthidae
- Genus: Triacanthus; Oken, 1817

Type species
- Balistes biaculeatus Bloch, 1786

= Triacanthus =

- T. biaculeatus

Genus of fishes

Triacanthus is a genus of marine ray-finned fish belonging to the family Triacanthidae, the triplespines or tripodfishes. The two species in this genus are found in the Indian Ocean and the western Pacific Ocean.

== Taxonomy ==
Triacanthus was first proposed as a monospecific genus in 1786 by the German naturalist Lorenz Oken with Balistes biaculeatus as its type species by monotypy. B. aculeatus was first formally described in 1786 by the German physician and naturalist Marcus Elieser Bloch with its type locality given as the Indian Ocean. In 1968, James C. Tyler classified the family Triacanthidae within the suborder Triacanthoidei alongside the Triacanthodidae. The 5th edition of Fishes of the World classifies the Triacanthoidei as suborder of the order Tetraodontiformes.

== Etymology ==
Triacanthus comes from Ancient Greek τρι- (tri-), meaning "three", and ἄκανθα (ákantha), meaning "spine", alluding to the long and robust first spine of the dorsal fin and the two large spines in the pelvic fins. Balistes, the genus the type species was originally classified in, does not possess pelvic fin spines.

== Species ==
Triacanthus currently has 2 recognised species classified within it:

- Triacanthus biaculeatus (Bloch, 1786) (Short-nosed tripodfish)
- Triacanthus nieuhofii Bleeker, 1852 (Silver tripodfish)

== Characteristics ==
Triacanthus tripodfishes have a lower, scaly surface of the pelvis that is nearly as wide at the front as it is at the rear and which does not taper to a point. There are six spines in the dorsal fin, the first spine being between three and four times longer than the second spine. There are 21 to 26 soft rays in the dorsal fin and 17 to 23 in the anal fin. The scales have low emarginated cross-shaped ridges. The two species in the genus are similar in size with maximum published total lengths for T. biaculeatus of 30 cm (12 in) and for T. nieuhofii of 28 cm (11 in).

== Distribution and habitat ==
Triacanthus tripodfishes have an Indo-West Pacific distribution and are found in the Persian Gulf and Gulf of Oman east to Indonesia, north to Japan and south to northern Australia. These fishes are found in coastal waters and estuaries, on sand or mud flats typically no deeper than 60 m (200 ft).

== Human utilisation ==
Triacanthus tripodfishes are sold as fresh fish in markets and are used in traditional Chinese medicine.
