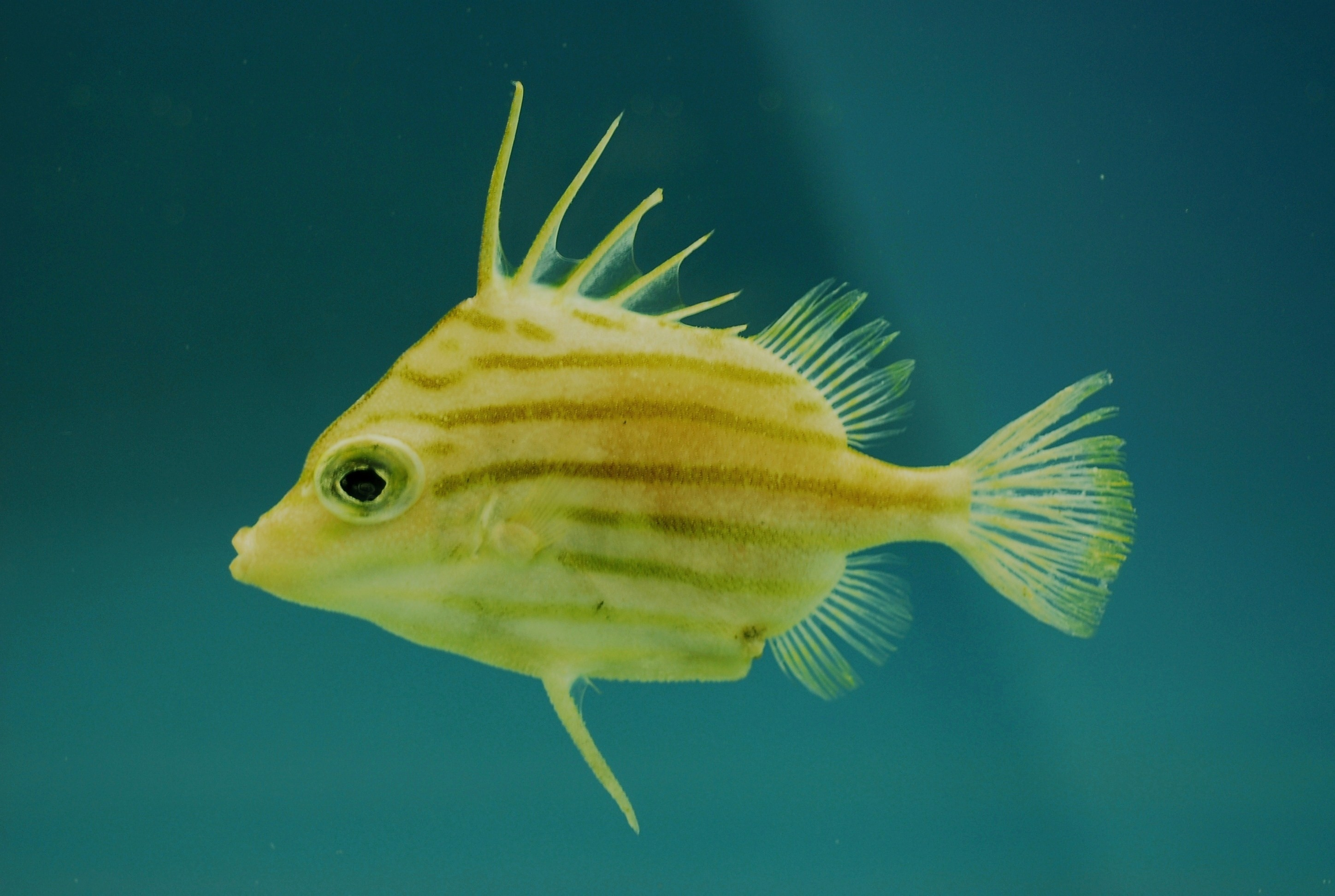
- Parahollardia lineata

Scientific classification
- Kingdom: Animalia
- Phylum: Chordata
- Class: Actinopterygii
- Order: Tetraodontiformes
- Suborder: Triacanthoidei
- Family: Triacanthodidae; T. N. Gill, 1862

Subfamilies and genera
- see text

= Spikefish =

Spikefishes Temporal range: Oligocene–Recent

Family of fishes

The spikefishes (family Triacanthodidae) are ray-finned fishes related to the pufferfishes and triggerfishes. They live in deep waters; more than 50 meters (165 feet), but above the continental shelves. They are found in the Atlantic, Indian Ocean, and the west-central Pacific.

The spikefishes are quite variable in form, with some species having tubular snouts (greatly elongated in Halimochirurgus and Macrorhamphosodes), and others have spoon-like teeth for scraping the scales off other fishes. Depending on the exact species involved, they reach a maximum length of about 5–22 centimetres (2.0–8.7 in).

While spikefish are shaped in a wide variety of different colors, sizes, and shapes, they can characterized by their similarities of having a dense body with relatively thick skin, a large amount of tiny yet spiky scales, two dorsal fins of which the first contains six spines and twelve to eighteen soft spines along the second, a rounded caudal fin, small and terminal mouth with at least 10 average sized conical teeth.

== Taxonomy ==
The spikefish family, Triacanthodidae, was first proposed in 1862 by the American biologist Theodore Gill and, in 1968, James C. Tyler classified it within the suborder Triacanthoidei alongside the Triacanthidae, as well as proposing the subfamily Hollardinae. The 5th edition of Fishes of the World classifies this as suborder of the order Tetraodontiformes.

== Subfamiles and genera ==
The spikefish family, Triacanthodidae, is divided into two subfamilies and eleven genera as follows:

- Subfamily Hollardiinae Tyler, 1968
  - Genus Hollardia Poey, 1861
  - Genus Parahollardia Fraser-Brunner, 1941
  - Genus †Prohollardia Tyler, 1993 (fossil; Oligocene)
- Subfamily Triacanthodinae Gill, 1862
  - Genus Atrophacanthus Fraser-Brunner, 1950
  - Genus Bathyphylax Myers 1934
  - Genus †Carpathospinosus Tyler, 1993 (fossil; Oligocene)
  - Genus Halimochirurgus Alcock, 1899
  - Genus Johnsonina Myers, 1934
  - Genus Macrorhamphosodes Fowler, 1934
  - Genus Mephisto Tyler, 1966
  - Genus Paratriacanthodes Fowler, 1934
  - Genus Triacanthodes Bleeker, 1857
  - Genus Tydemania Weber, 1913
