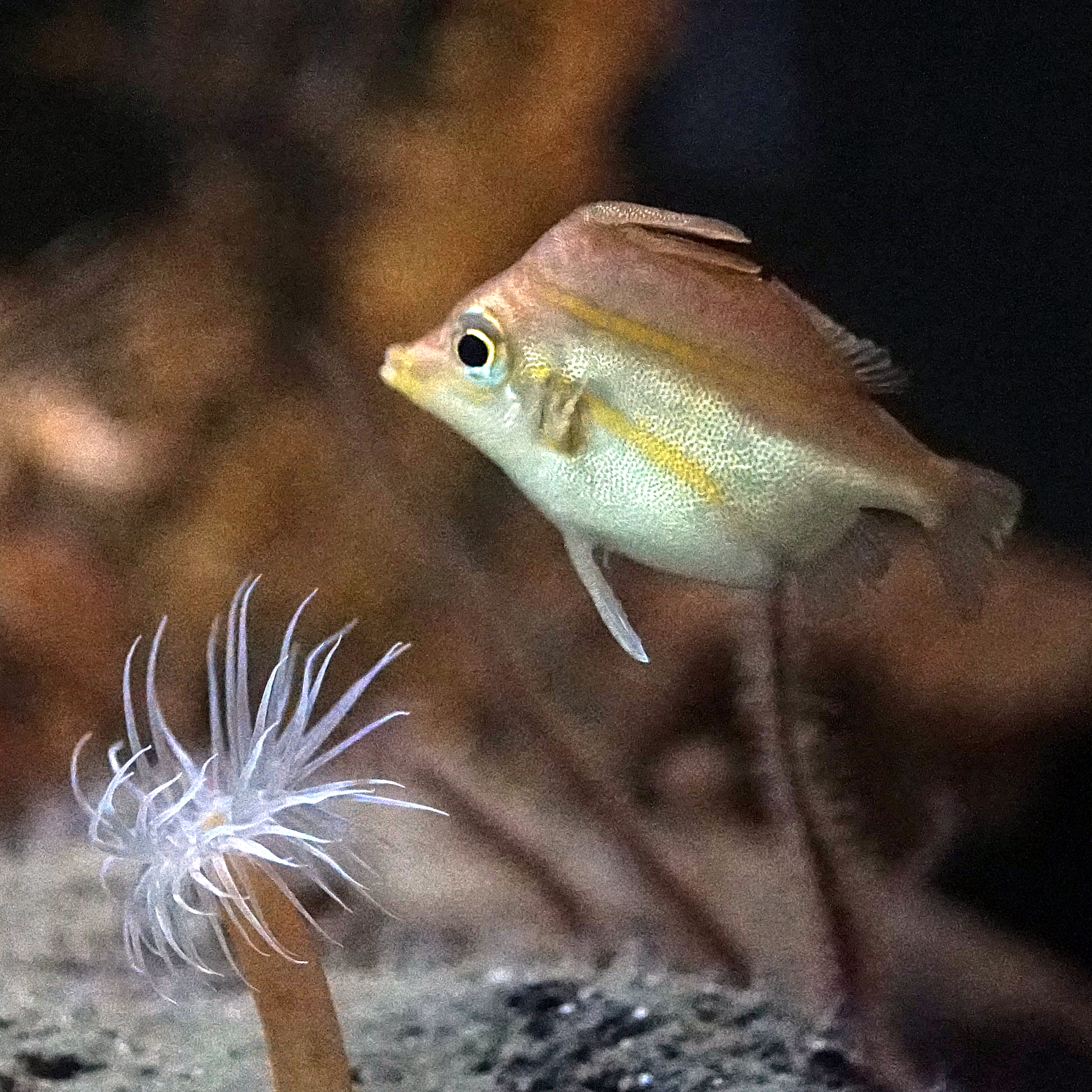
- Triacanthodes anomalus

Scientific classification
- Kingdom: Animalia
- Phylum: Chordata
- Class: Actinopterygii
- Division: Teleostei
- Order: Tetraodontiformes
- Suborder: Triacanthoidei; Tyler, 1968

Families
- see text

= Triacanthoidei =

Suborder of fishes

Triacanthoidei is a suborder of ray-finned fishes belonging to the order Tetraodontiformes, which includes the pufferfishes, triggerfishes and related taxa. These benthic fishes are mainly found in the Indian Ocean with some of the spikefishes found in the Western Atlantic Ocean.

== Taxonomy ==
Triacanthoidei was first proposed as a superfamily, the Triacanthoidea, in 1968 by the American ichthyologist James C. Tyler who placed it in the monotypic suborder Triacanthoidei. The 5th edition of Fishes of the World does not use the superfamily classification for this taxon, listing only the suborder and its constituent families within the order Tetraodontiformes.

== Etymology ==
Triacanthoidei has its base in the name of the genus Triacanthus which prefixes acanthus, meaning "thorn" or "spine" with tri, which means "three". This is a reference too the large first spine of the dorsal fin and the two large spines in the pelvic fin. The element oid is a contraction of oides which means "resembles".

== Families ==
Triaconthoidei contains the following families:

- Family Triacanthodidae Gill, 1862 (Spikefishes)
  - Subfamily Hollardiinae Tyler, 1968
  - Subfamily Triacanthodinae Gill, 1862
- Family Triacanthidae Bleeker, 1859 (Triplespines)

== Characteristics ==
Triacanthoidei has been resolved as a monophyletic group and the two families share the some basal features. These include a dorsal nerve cord which is not greatly shortened, a large spine, and 2 soft rays, in the pelvic fins the spine can be locked into position. They also have a slightly protractible upper jaw, there are six spines in the dorsal fin and 12 main fin rays in the caudal fin. They have between 2 and 6 separate with 12 principal rays. The largest species in the group are Triacanthus biaculeatus and Trixiphichthys weberi both with maximum published total lengths of 30 cm (12 in), while the smallest is Atrophacanthus japonicus with a maximum published standard length is 4.4 cm (1.7 in).

== Distribution and habitat ==
Triacanthoidei fishes are found mainly in the Indo-Pacific region but the family Triacanthodidae gas some species in the Western Atlantic Ocean. The spikefishes are deepwater benthic marine fishes while the triplespines are shallow water, marine benthic fishes.
