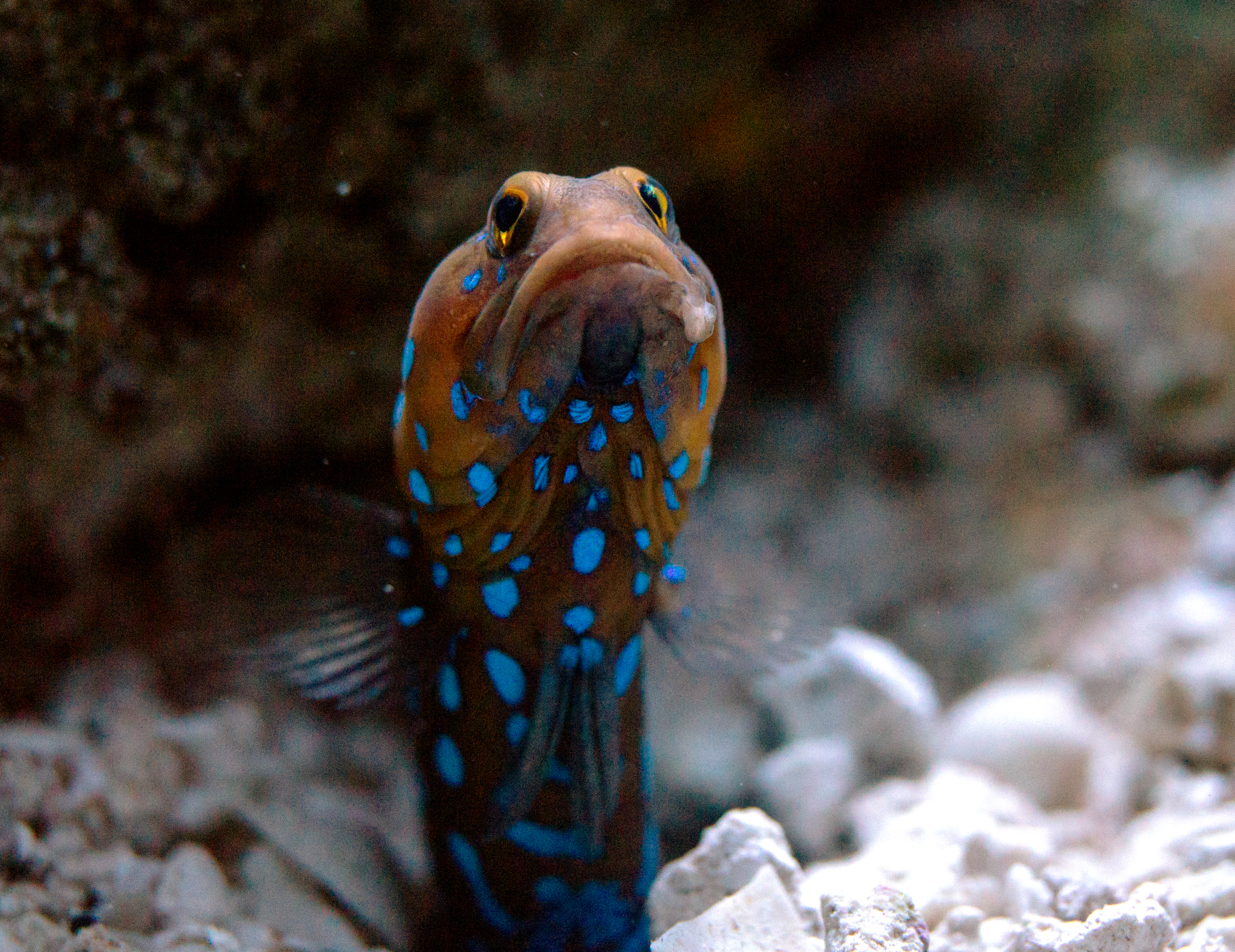
- A blue-spotted jawfish at Monterey Bay Aquarium

Conservation status
- Least Concern (IUCN 3.1)

Scientific classification
- Kingdom: Animalia
- Phylum: Chordata
- Class: Actinopterygii
- Order: Blenniiformes
- Family: Opistognathidae
- Genus: Opistognathus
- Species: O. rosenblatti

Binomial name
- Opistognathus rosenblatti G. R. Allen & D. R. Robertson, 1991

= Blue-spotted jawfish =

Species of fish

The blue-spotted jawfish (Opistognathus rosenblatti) is a species of jawfish native to the Gulf of California. It is an inhabitant of reefs where it is found in large colonies at depths of around 12 metres (39 ft). This species hides in its burrow at night, completely sealing the entrance. Every morning, it rebuilds the burrow entrance. It can reach a length of 10 centimetres (3.9 in) TL. It can also be found in the aquarium trade.

The blue-spotted jawfish was first discovered in the Tropical Eastern Pacific by Gerald Allen and David R. Robertson in 1991. They belong to the class of Actinopterygii.

== Description ==
The blue-spotted jawfish have an electric-blue spotting over a yellow or orange body with an elegant yellow dorsal fin. They have large eyes that make them look as "alien". The males have stark white in their anterior halves. The females and the non-courting males are dark brown and have larger blue spots. The younger jawfish are uniformly colored yellow with blue spots.

== Biology ==
Jawfish are named for their large mouths, which allow them to catch food. Their large mouths also allow them to dig their burrows by taking big mouthfuls of sand and spitting them out in order to create their hideaways. Some jawfish consume worms, crustaceans, and invertebrates, but the blue-spotted jawfish feeds on tiny animals: benthic and planktonic invertebrates. They are colonial species and can be found in quite large colonies.

== Habitat ==
The blue-spotted jawfish are very social amongst other members of its own species. They are not aggressive except to those who try to enter their burrows. They are found in cold water at deeper depth of the ocean in sandy rubbles and reef areas. They live in colonies of up to several hundred fish, with a minimal spacing of 1 to 3 m (3.3 to 9.8 ft) between individuals. They cover their burrow entrance at dusk and rebuild the opening every morning. Unlike the Opistognathus aurifrons, the blue-spotted jawfish only spend time out and above their burrows during the warm summer season.

== Health ==
There are two diseases that can affect the blue-spotted jawfish. First of all, the Brooklynellosis and blue-spotted jawfish disease. When the blue-spotted jawfish are affected by the Brooklynella, it is likely that they will deteriorate and die within approximately 24 hours. The symptoms of Brooklynellosis include: peeling skin and color loss all over the body, or no appetite. They may leave their burrow and list around until they eventually die. However, Brookynella is easily treated in a quarantine tank using malachite green in combination with formalin.

The so-called "Blue spot jawfish disease" is almost always damage to the fish caused by; rough handling, coarse or abrasive substrate, being kept on bare glass, or, from being kept at above 21c.

== Reproduction ==
Jawfish are mouth brooders, they utilize their mouth to hold the eggs until they reach the hatching point. They incubate the eggs in their mouths for about 5 to 7 days. In addition, males display behaviorally and color-wise in the summer months by becoming bright white, dashing 3 to 4 feet (0.91 to 1.22 m) above their burrow, trying to attract the females. If the male is successful attracting the female, then the female join his tube for a few minutes after returning in hers.

== Name ==
The specific name honours Richard H. Rosenblatt (1930–2014), an ichthyologist at the Scripps Institution of Oceanography, who made many contributions to the study of the fishes of the eastern Pacific.
