= Bartail =

Bartail may refer to:

- Bartail flathead, a bottom-dwelling fish
- Bartail jawfish, a mouthbrooding fish
- Bartail spurdog, a dogfish shark

== See also ==
- Bar-tailed (disambiguation)
