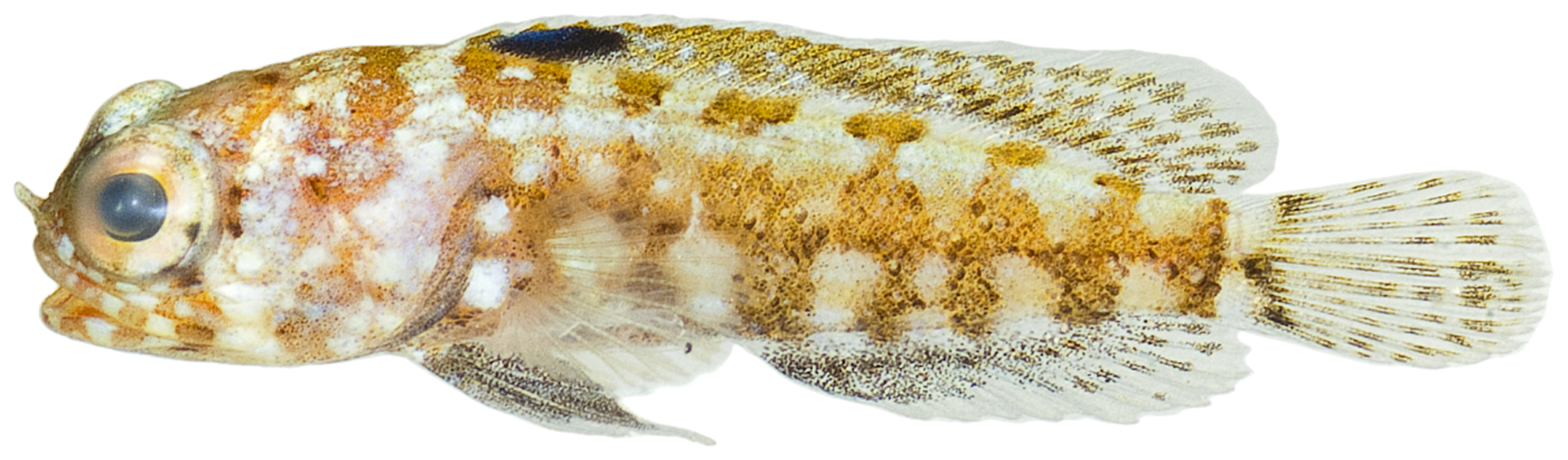
- Opistognathus whitehursti

Conservation status
- Least Concern (IUCN 3.1)

Scientific classification
- Kingdom: Animalia
- Phylum: Chordata
- Class: Actinopterygii
- Order: Blenniiformes
- Family: Opistognathidae
- Genus: Opistognathus
- Species: O. whitehurstii

Binomial name
- Opistognathus whitehurstii (Longley, 1927)

Synonyms
- Gnathypops whitehursti Longley, 1927; Upsilonognathus chaplini Fowler, 1946

= Dusky jawfish =

Species of fish

The dusky jawfish (Opistognathus whitehursti) is a species of jawfish native to the western Atlantic Ocean including the Gulf of Mexico and the Caribbean Sea where it is an inhabitant of reefs at depths of from 1 to 12 metres (3.3 to 39.4 ft). It can reach a length of 14 centimetres (5.5 in) TL. This species can also be found in the aquarium trade.

== Etymology ==
The specific name honours Dr. D. D. Whitehurst, a collector of specimens for the Smithsonian Institution, one of which was the type specimen of this species.
