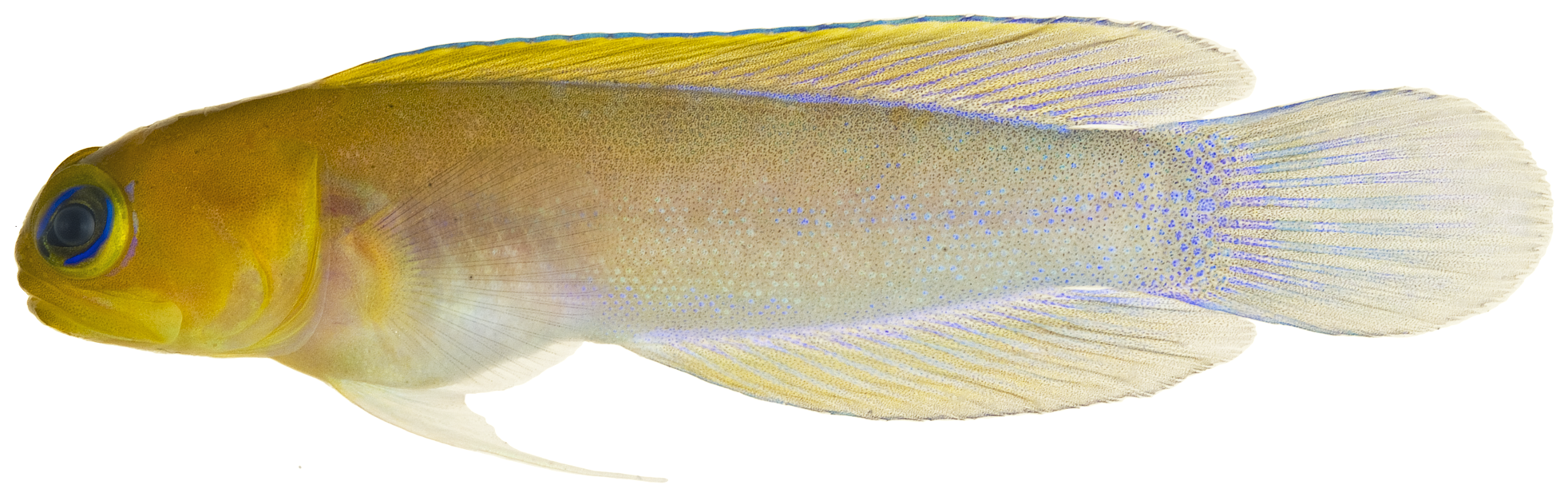
- Opistognathus aurifrons
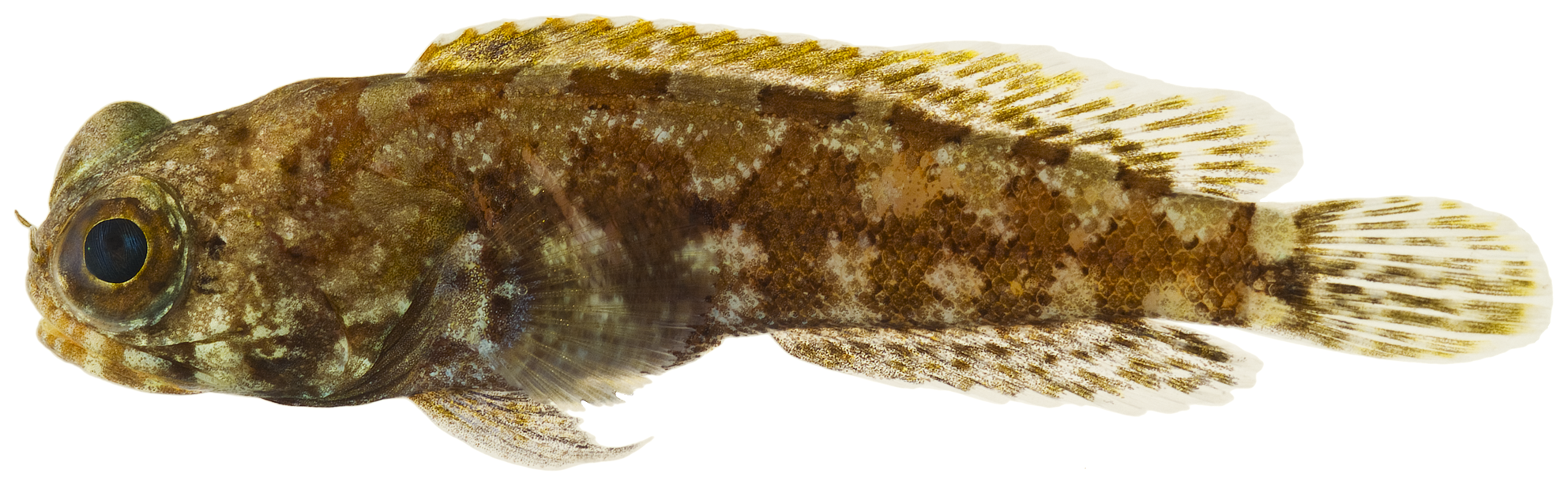
- Opistognathus whitehursti

Scientific classification
- Kingdom: Animalia
- Phylum: Chordata
- Class: Actinopterygii
- Order: Blenniiformes
- Family: Opistognathidae
- Genus: Opistognathus; G. Cuvier, 1816

Type species
- Opistognathus nigromarginatus Rüppell, 1830

Synonyms
- Gnathypops Gill, 1862; Merogymnoides Whitley, 1966; Merogymnus Ogilby, 1908; Tandya Whitley, 1930; Upsilonognathus Fowler, 1946

= Opistognathus =

Genus of fishes

Opistognathus is a genus of fish in the family Opistognathidae found in the Atlantic, Indian and Pacific Ocean.

== Species ==
There are currently 72 recognized species in this genus:

- Opistognathus adelus Smith-Vaniz, 2010 (Obscure jawfish)
- Opistognathus afer Smith-Vaniz, 2010 (African jawfish)
- Opistognathus albicaudatus Smith-Vaniz, 2011 (White-tail jawfish)
- Opistognathus alleni Smith-Vaniz, 2004 (Abrolhos jawfish)
- Opistognathus annulatus (Eibl-Eibesfeldt & Klausewitz, 1961)
- Opistognathus aurifrons (D. S. Jordan & J. C. Thompson, 1905) (Yellow-head jawfish)
- Opistognathus brasiliensis Smith-Vaniz, 1997 (Dark-fin jawfish)
- Opistognathus brochus W. A. Bussing & Lavenberg, 2003
- Opistognathus castelnaui Bleeker, 1860 (Castelnau's jawfish)
- Opistognathus crassus Smith-Vaniz, 2010 (Stout jawfish)
- Opistognathus cryos Su & Ho 2024
- Opistognathus cuvierii Valenciennes, 1836 (Bar-tail jawfish)
- Opistognathus cyanospilotus Smith-Vaniz, 2009 (Blue-blotch jawfish)
- Opistognathus darwiniensis W. J. Macleay, 1878 (Darwin jawfish)
- Opistognathus decorus Smith-Vaniz & Yoshino, 1985
- Opistognathus dendriticus (D. S. Jordan & R. E. Richardson, 1908) (Dendtric jawfish)
- Opistognathus dipharus Smith-Vaniz, 2010 (Tail-beacon jawfish)
- Opistognathus elizabethensis Smith-Vaniz, 2004 (Elizabeth Reef jawfish)
- Opistognathus ensiferus Smith-Vaniz, 2016
- Opistognathus evermanni (D. S. Jordan & Snyder, 1902)
- Opistognathus eximius (J. D. Ogilby, 1908) (Harlequin jawfish)
- Opistognathus fenmutis Acero P & Franke, 1993
- Opistognathus fossoris W. A. Bussing & Lavenberg, 2003
- Opistognathus galapagensis G. R. Allen & D. R. Robertson, 1991 (Galapagos jawfish)
- Opistognathus gilberti J. E. Böhlke, 1967 (Yellow jawfish)
- Opistognathus hongkongiensis W. L. Y. Chan, 1968
- Opistognathus hopkinsi (D. S. Jordan & Snyder, 1902)
- Opistognathus inornatus E. P. Ramsay & J. D. Ogilby, 1887 (Black jawfish)
- Opistognathus iyonis (D. S. Jordan & W. F. Thompson, 1913)
- Opistognathus jacksoniensis W. J. Macleay, 1881 (Jawfish)
- Opistognathus latitabundus (Whitley, 1937) (Blotched jawfish)
- Opistognathus leprocarus Smith-Vaniz, 1997 (Rough-cheek jawfish)
- Opistognathus liturus Smith-Vaniz & Yoshino, 1985
- Opistognathus lonchurus D. S. Jordan & C. H. Gilbert, 1882 (Moustache jawfish)
- Opistognathus longinaris Smith-Vaniz, 2010 (Long-nostril jawfish)
- Opistognathus macrognathus Poey, 1860 (Banded jawfish)
- Opistognathus macrolepis W. K. H. Peters, 1866 (Big-scale jawfish)
- Opistognathus margaretae Smith-Vaniz, 1983 (Half-scaled jawfish)
- Opistognathus maxillosus Poey, 1860 (Mottled jawfish)
- Opistognathus megalepis Smith-Vaniz, 1972 (Large-scale jawfish)
- Opistognathus melachasme Smith-Vaniz, 1972 (Yellow-mouth jawfish)
- Opistognathus mexicanus G. R. Allen & D. R. Robertson, 1991 (Mexican jawfish)
- Opistognathus muscatensis Boulenger, 1888 (Robust jawfish)
- Opistognathus nigromarginatus Rüppell, 1830 (Birdled jawfish)
- Opistognathus nothus Smith-Vaniz, 1997
- Opistognathus panamaensis G. R. Allen & D. R. Robertson, 1991 (Panamanian jawfish)
- Opistognathus papuensis Bleeker, 1868 (Papuan jawfish)
- Opistognathus pardus Smith-Vaniz, Bineesh & Akhilesh, 2012 (Leopard jawfish)
- Opistognathus punctatus W. K. H. Peters, 1869 (Fine-spotted jawfish)
- Opistognathus randalli Smith-Vaniz, 2009 (Gold-specs jawfish)
- Opistognathus reticeps Smith-Vaniz, 2004
- Opistognathus reticulatus (McKay, 1969) (Reticulated jawfish)
- Opistognathus rhomaleus D. S. Jordan & C. H. Gilbert, 1882 (Giant jawfish)
- Opistognathus robinsi Smith-Vaniz, 1997 (Spot-fin jawfish)
- Opistognathus rosenbergii Bleeker, 1856 (Rosenberg's jawfish)
- Opistognathus rosenblatti G. R. Allen & D. R. Robertson, 1991 (Blue-spotted jawfish)
- Opistognathus rufilineatus Smith-Vaniz & G. R. Allen, 2007 (Red-lined jawfish)
- Opistognathus scops (O. P. Jenkins & Evermann, 1889) (Bulls-eye jawfish)
- Opistognathus seminudus Smith-Vaniz, 2004 (Half-naked jawfish)
- Opistognathus signatus Smith-Vaniz, 1997
- Opistognathus simus Smith-Vaniz, 2010 (Cargados jawfish)
- Opistognathus smithvanizi W. A. Bussing & Lavenberg, 2003
- Opistognathus solorensis Bleeker, 1853 (Solor jawfish)
- Opistognathus stigmosus Smith-Vaniz, 2004 (Coral Sea jawfish)
- Opistognathus trimaculatus Hiramatsu & Endo, 2013 (Five-banded jawfish)
- Opistognathus variabilis Smith-Vaniz, 2009 (Variable jawfish)
- Opistognathus verecundus Smith-Vaniz, 2004 (Bashful jawfish)
- Opistognathus walkeri W. A. Bussing & Lavenberg, 2003
- Opistognathus whitehursti (Longley, 1927) (Dusky jawfish)
- Opistognathus ctenion Fujiwara, Motomura & Shinohara, 2023
- Opistognathus schrieri Smith-Vaniz, 2017
- Opistognathus thionyi Smith-Vaniz, Tornabene & Macieira, 2018
- Opistognathus vicinus Smith-Vaniz, Tornabene & Macieira, 2018
- Opistognathus ocellicaudatus Shinohara, 2021
- Opistognathus wharekuriensis Schwarzhans, 2019
