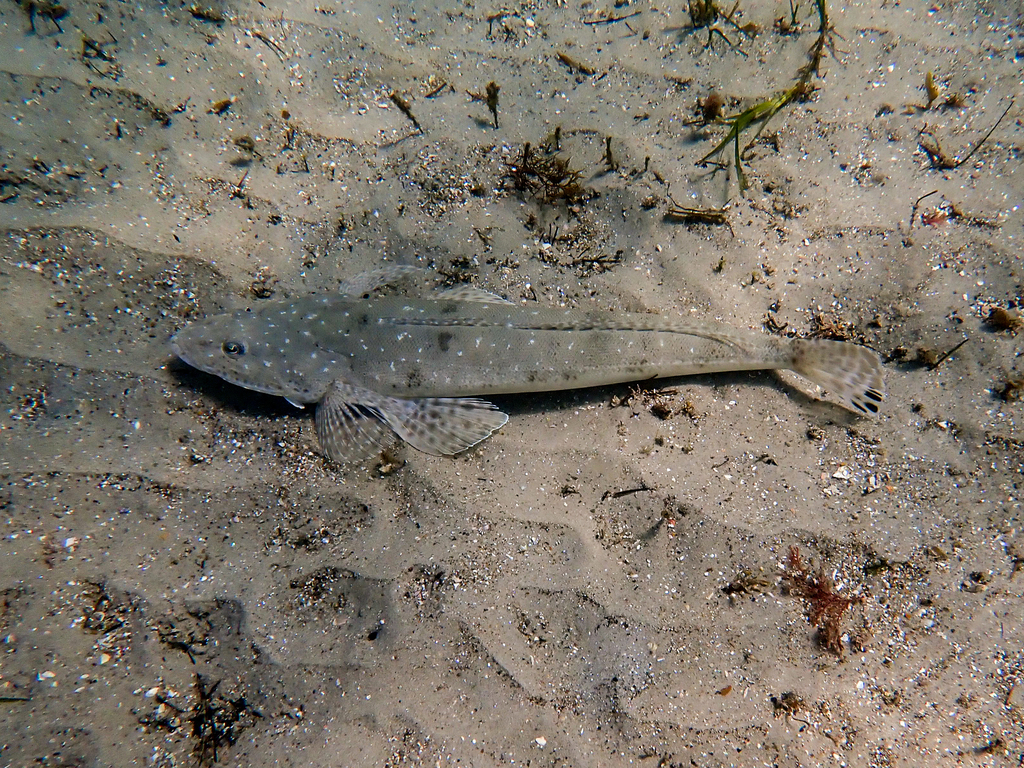

Scientific classification
- Kingdom: Animalia
- Phylum: Chordata
- Class: Actinopterygii
- Order: Perciformes
- Family: Platycephalidae
- Genus: Platycephalus
- Species: P. speculator

Binomial name
- Platycephalus speculator Klunzinger, 1872

Synonyms
- Neoplatycephalus speculator (Klunzinger, 1872); Platycephalus castelnaui Macleay, 1881; Planiprora melsoni Whitley, 1945

= Platycephalus speculator =

Species of fish

Platycephalus speculator, the southern bluespotted flathead, Castelnau's flathead, deepwater flathead, king flathead, Lakes Entrance flathead, longnose flathead, shovelnose flathead, Southern dusky flathead, Southern flathead or yank flathead, is a common species of flathead. This species is endemic to southern Australia.

== Taxonomy ==
Platycephalus speculator was first formally described in 1872 by the German zoologist Carl Benjamin Klunzinger with its type locality given as Hobson's Bay in Victoria. The specific name speculator means "explorer", "searcher" or "investigator", an allusion Klunzinger did not explain, but it may refer to the much larger eyes of this species in comparison to the bartail flathead (P. indicus).

== Description ==
Platycephalus speculator has an elongated and slightly flattened body with a large, flattened head which is about one-third of the standard length with several smooth bony ridges which have very few spines on them. It has moderately large eyes with wide, rounded lappets on the irises. The large mouth has small, pointed teeth on the jaws, one or two rows of vomerine teeth and a single row of palatine teeth on each of the palatines. There are no enlarged canine-like teeth. The preoperculum has two robust spines at its angle with the lower spine being a little longer than the upper. The first dorsal fin is short based, has 8 or 9 spines with the first spine being very short and is separate. The second dorsal fin has a moderately long base with 13 or 14, typically 14, soft rays with the first rays being the longest. The anal fin has a similar shape and is opposite the second dorsal fin, has a slightly longer base and contains 14 soft rays. The caudal fin is truncate to rounded. This species attains a maximum published total length of 90 cm (35 in), and a maximum weight of 8 kg (18 lb). The overall colour is sandy to dark brown or greyish, lighter ventrally, with a lot of dark blotches and whitish to bluish spots. There are between 3 and 5 large white-margined black spots or blotches on the distal part of the caudal fin, progressively shrinking dorsally.

== Distribution and habitat ==
Platycephalus speculator is endemic to southern Australia where it ranges from Point Hicks in Victoria to Kalbarri in Western Australia), it also occurs off northern Tasmania. This species prefer areas of sand and seaweed beds in shallow coastal waters, particularly shallow sheltered bays, living down to 30 m (98 ft) depth.

== Biology ==
Platycephalus speculator feeds largely on fishes, aas well as large benthic crustaceans. The breeding season peaks in the summer and early autumn, in December to March. Spawning typically occurs in the sea, however, in some areas it takes place within estuaries, even when the estuary is cut off from the sea.

== Fisheries ==
Platycephalus speculator is the commonest flathead sold in Western Australian fish markets. Along Australia's southern coast this species is caught using beach seines, gill nets and haul nets.
