= Flathead (fish) =

Common name for several species of fish

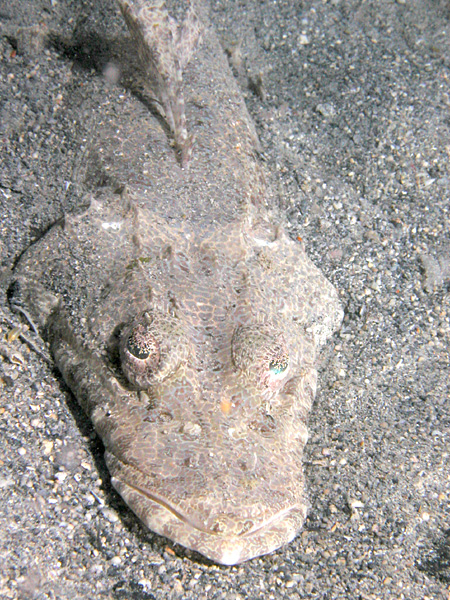
Fringe-lipped flathead, Papua New Guinea

A flathead is one of a number of small to medium fish species with notably flat heads, distributed in membership across various genera of the family Platycephalidae. Many species are found in estuaries and the open ocean in the Indo-Pacific, especially most parts of Australia where they are popular sport and table fish. Flathead can grow at least 1 metre (3.3 ft) in length and 18 kilograms (40 lb) in weight, with dusky flathead (Platycephalus fuscus) being the largest, although fish this size are rarely caught.

== Anatomy and morphology ==
Flathead are notable for their unusual body shape, which their hunting strategy is based upon. Flathead are dorsally compressed, meaning their body is wide but flattened and very low in height. Both eyes are on the top of the flattened head, giving excellent binocular vision to attack overhead prey. The effect is somewhat similar to flounders. In contrast to flounder, however, flathead are much more elongated, the tail remains vertical, and the mouth is large, wide and symmetrical. Flathead utilize this body structure to hide in sand (their body colour changes to match their background), with only their eyes visible, and explode upwards and outwards to engulf small fish and prawns as they drift over, using a combination of ram and suction feeding thereby improving their chances to catch prey.

Flathead have two short spikes on either side of their heads and on top of their heads that contain venom. The venom, while not fatal, can cause pain and infection for no more than about 2 days. Some anglers believe the pain of the sting of the Flathead fish can be reduced by rubbing the slime of the belly of the same fish that caused the sting on the inflicted wound, due to a particular gland in its belly.

== Habitat ==
Dusky flatheads (Platycephalus fuscus) are found in estuaries and coastal bays from Cairns in Queensland to the Gippsland Lakes in Victoria. They occur over sand, mud, gravel and seagrass and can inhabit estuarine waters up to the tidal limit.

Oceanic flathead species (sand flathead, tiger flathead, bar-tailed flathead) are, as named, generally located more offshore than the dusky flathead, frequenting the sandy zones around and between coastal reefs; although bar-tailed flathead occur in many estuarine environments, for example the Swan/Canning River System in Perth.

Dusky flathead, Platycephalus fuscus

== Importance to humans ==
Fishermen catch flathead on a variety of baits and artificial lures all year round, but they are more commonly caught during summer. Only a handful of the many flathead species are regularly caught by fishermen. Saltwater estuaries along the east coast of Australia are a popular place for recreational fishing for flathead species such as the Dusky Flathead. The Australian state of New South Wales has a substantial commercial flathead catch. Many flathead species are commonly used as food in Australia.

However, as of 2022, the sand flathead (Platycephalus bassensis) was classified as depleted due to overfishing.

== See also ==
- Platycephalus
