= Black flathead =

Black flathead is a common name for several Australian fishes and may refer to:

- Platycephalus fuscus, native to eastern Australia
- Platycephalus laevigatus, native to southern Australia

== See also ==
- Pylodictis olivaris, flathead catfish, native to eastern North America
