= Microcotyle bassensis =

Scientific classification
- Kingdom: Animalia
- Phylum: Platyhelminthes
- Class: Monogenea
- Order: Mazocraeidea
- Family: Microcotylidae
- Genus: Microcotyle
- Species: M. bassensis

Binomial name
- Microcotyle bassensis Murray, 1931

Synonyms
- Paramicrocotyle bassensis (Murray, 1931) Caballero & Bravo-Hollis, 1972

Species of worms

Microcotyle bassensis is a species of monogenean, parasitic on the gills of a marine fish. It belongs to the family Microcotylidae.

== Systematics ==
Microcotyle bassensis was first described by Florence Murray in 1931. It was redescribed by Woolcock in 1936 from specimens forwarded to him by Murray, and by Dillon et al., (1985) who completed the original and subsequent redescription of the adult's morphology. Microcotyle bassensis was transferred by Caballero & Bravo-Hollis to the genus Paramicrocotyle as Paramicrocotyle bassensis. Mamaev, in his revision of the family Microcotylidae, suppressed this combination, reassigned the species to the genus Microcotyle and considered Paramicrocotyle a junior subjective synonym of Microcotyle.

A sequence of the species' ITS2 rDNA gene has been published.

== Hosts and localities ==
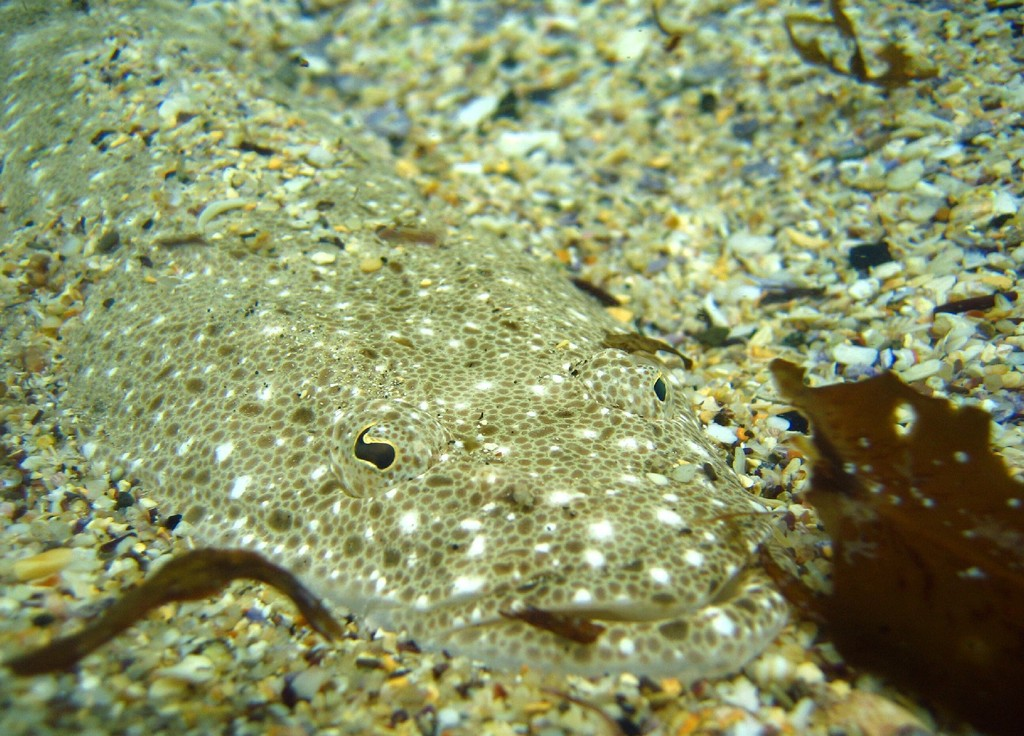
The Southern sand flathead Platycephalus bassensis is the type-host of Microcotyle bassensis

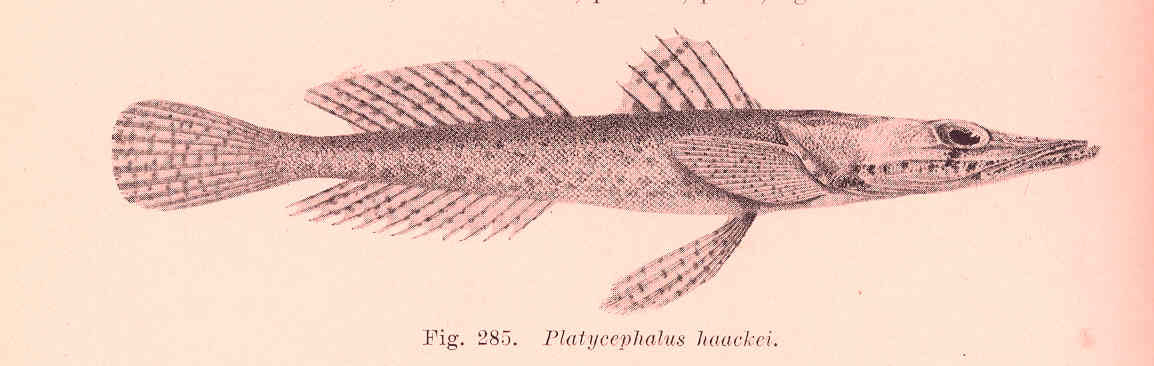
The flathead Platycephalus haackei (currently Platycephalus richardsoni) is also host of Microcotyle bassensis

The type-host is the Southern sand flathead Platycephalus bassensis (Platycephalidae ). It was also recorded on other Platycephalidae; the bluespotted flathead Platycephalus caeruleopunctatus and the flathead Platycephalus haackei (currently Platycephalus richardsoni), and from Platycephalus sp.

Microcotyle bassensis was first described from fishes caught off Port Phillip Bay, Victoria, Australia. It was also reported again from the type locality.
