= Moustache jawfish =

Conservation status
- Least Concern (IUCN 3.1)

Scientific classification
- Domain: Eukaryota
- Kingdom: Animalia
- Phylum: Chordata
- Class: Actinopterygii
- Order: Blenniiformes
- Family: Opistognathidae
- Genus: Opistognathus
- Species: O. lonchurus

Binomial name
- Opistognathus lonchurus D. S. Jordan & C. H. Gilbert, 1882

Synonyms
- Gnathypops mystacinus D. S. Jordan, 1884

Species of fish

The moustache jawfish (Opistognathus lonchurus) is a species of jawfish native to the western Atlantic Ocean where it occurs in the Gulf of Mexico and the Caribbean Sea. It is a reef inhabitant. This species can reach a length of 10 centimetres (3.9 in) TL. It can also be found in the aquarium trade.
