= Microcotyle victoriae =

Scientific classification
- Kingdom: Animalia
- Phylum: Platyhelminthes
- Class: Monogenea
- Order: Mazocraeidea
- Family: Microcotylidae
- Genus: Microcotyle
- Species: M. victoriae

Binomial name
- Microcotyle victoriae Woolcock, 1936

Synonyms
- Microcotyle (Microcotyle) victoriae (Woolcock, 1936) Unnithan, 1971; Paramicrocotyle victoriae (Woolcock, 1936) Caballero & Bravo-Hollis, 1972

Species of worm

Microcotyle victoriae is a species of monogenean, parasitic on the gills of a marine fish. It belongs to the family Microcotylidae.

== Systematics ==
Microcotyle victoriae was first described by Woolcock in 1936. In the same paper, Woolcock re-examined Microcotyle bassensis Murray, 1931 and included essential data of its structure and measurements, and described a second new species Microcotyle sillaginae from the gills of Sillaginodes punctatus (Sillaginidae). The latest monogenean is currently included in the genus Polylabris. In 1971, Microcotyle victoriae was included in the subgenus Microcotyle as Microcotyle (Microcotyle) victoriae. This species was transferred by Caballero & Bravo-Hollis to the genus Paramicrocotyle as Paramicrocotyle victoriae n. comb. Mamaev, in his revision of the family Microcotylidae, suppressed this combination, reassigned the species to the genus Microcotyle as Microcotyle victoriae and considered Paramicrocotyle a junior subjective synonym of Microcotyle.

== Morphology ==
Microcotyle victoriae has the general morphology of all species of Microcotyle, with a flat slender, symmetrical body, comprising an anterior part which contains most organs and a posterior part called the haptor. The haptor is symmetrical, distinctly separated from body proper and bears 17-25 pairs of clamps, arranged as two rows, one on each side. The clamps of the haptor attach the animal to the gill of the fish. There are also two almost circular buccal suckers, provided with a membranous septum at the anterior extremity. The digestive organs include an anterior, terminal mouth with a folded ventral lip, a small and spherical muscular pharynx, and a posterior intestine with two lateral branches of unequal length. Each adult contains male and female reproductive organs. The reproductive organs include an anterior genital atrium, with spines, a single median dorsal vagina, a single coiled ovary, and 18-22 small and rounded testes which are posterior to the ovary.

Woolcock (1936) gave drawings of the female genital organs (diagrammatic) and of the arrangement of atrial spines.

== Etymology ==
The specific name victoriae is derived from Victoria, the type-locality of this species.

== Hosts and localities ==
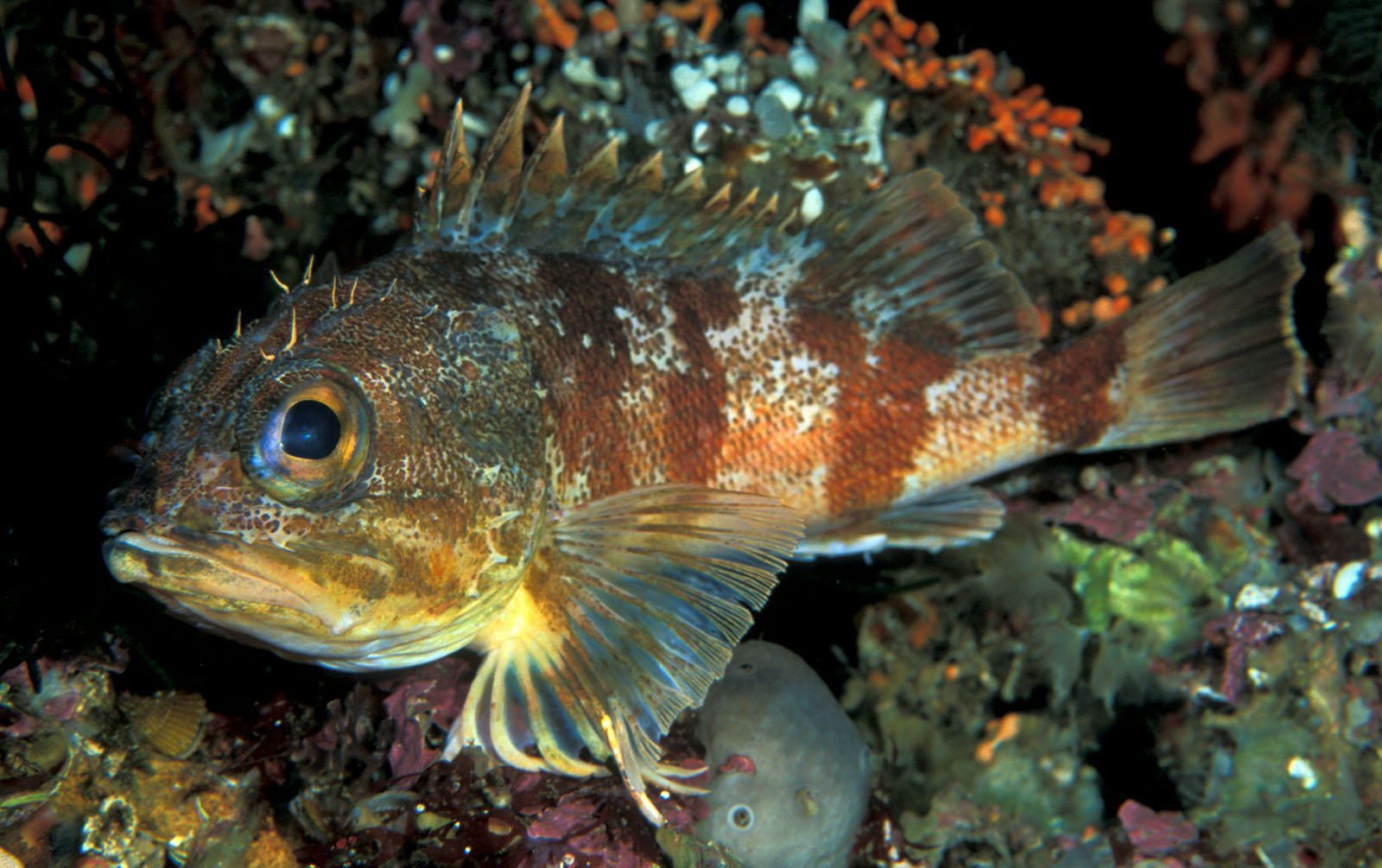
The type-host of Microcotyle victoriae is the red gurnard perch or jock stewart, Helicolenus percoides

The type-host and only recorded host of Microcotyle victoriae is the red gurnard perch or jock stewart, Helicolenus percoides (Sebastidae). The type-locality and only recorded locality is off Australia.
