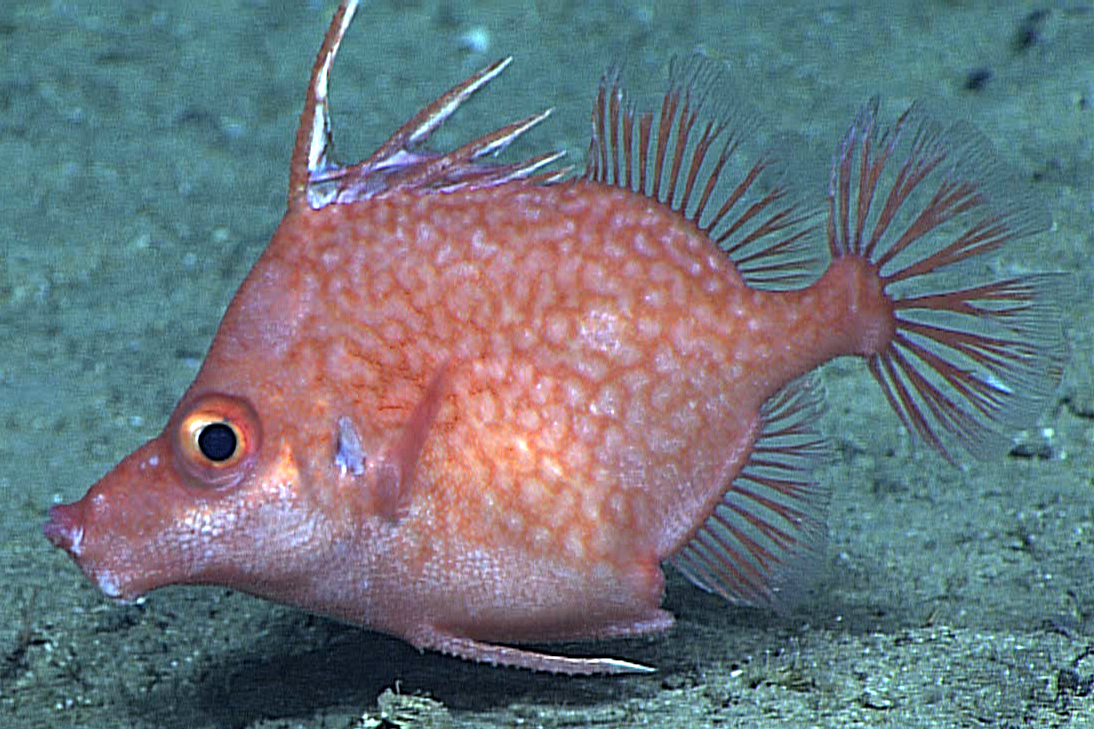
- Hawaiian spikefish Hollardia goslinei

Scientific classification
- Kingdom: Animalia
- Phylum: Chordata
- Class: Actinopterygii
- Order: Tetraodontiformes
- Family: Triacanthodidae
- Subfamily: Hollardiinae; Tyler, 1968

Genera
- See text

= Hollardiinae =

Subfamily of fishes

Hollardiinae is a subfamily of marine ray-finned fishes belonging to the family Triacanthodidae, the spikefishes. This small subfamily comprises two genera and a total of five species. All species except one are found in the tropical and subtropical waters of the Western Atlantic Ocean. The exception is found in the western and central Pacific Ocean.

== Taxonomy ==
Hollardiinae was first proposed as a subfamily of the family Triacanthodidae in 1968 by the American ichthyologist James C. Tyler. It is one of two subfamilies within the family, the other being the nominate, Triacanthodinae. The 5th edition of Fishes of the World classifies the family Triacanthodidae in the suborder Triacanthoidei along with the family Triacanthidae, the triplefins.

== Etymology ==
Hollardiinae takes its name from its type genus, Hollardia, which was named in honour of the French physician and naturalist Henri Hollard, a pioneering worker in the study of the Plectognathi.

== Genera and species ==
Hollardiinae contains the following genera and species:

- Hollardia Poey, 1861
  - Hollardia goslinei Tyler, 1968 (Hawaiian spikefish)
  - Hollardia hollardi Poey, 1861 (Reticulate spikefish)
  - Hollardia meadi Tyler, 1966 (Spotted spikefish)
- Parahollardia Fraser-Brunner, 1941
  - Parahollardia lineata (Longley, 1935) (Jambeau)
  - Parahollardia schmidti Woods, 1959 (Threeline spikefish)

== Characteristics ==
Hollardiinae spikefishes are distinguished from those in the nominate subfamily by the possession of a dome-like supraoccipital, and by the first branchiostegal ray being slightly enlarged at its tip but the tip not being turned inwards. The dome-like supraocciptal stops the epiotic bones from meeting on the upper surface of the skull. They also have a pelvis which resemvles a shaft and sits behind the spines of the pelvic fins. These are small fishes, with a maximum published total length of 20 cm (7.9 in) for P. lineata.

== Distribution and habitat ==
Hollardiinae spikefishes appear to have their origins in the prehistoric Tethys Sea at some time between the Palaeocene and the Oligocene, and from there they migrated west across the Atlantic Ocean. The majority of species are found in the tropical and temperate waters of the Western Atlantic Ocean, with one species, the Hawaiian spikefish, found in the central and western Pacific Oceans. These are benthic fishes found at depths between 230 and 396 m (755 and 1,299 ft).
