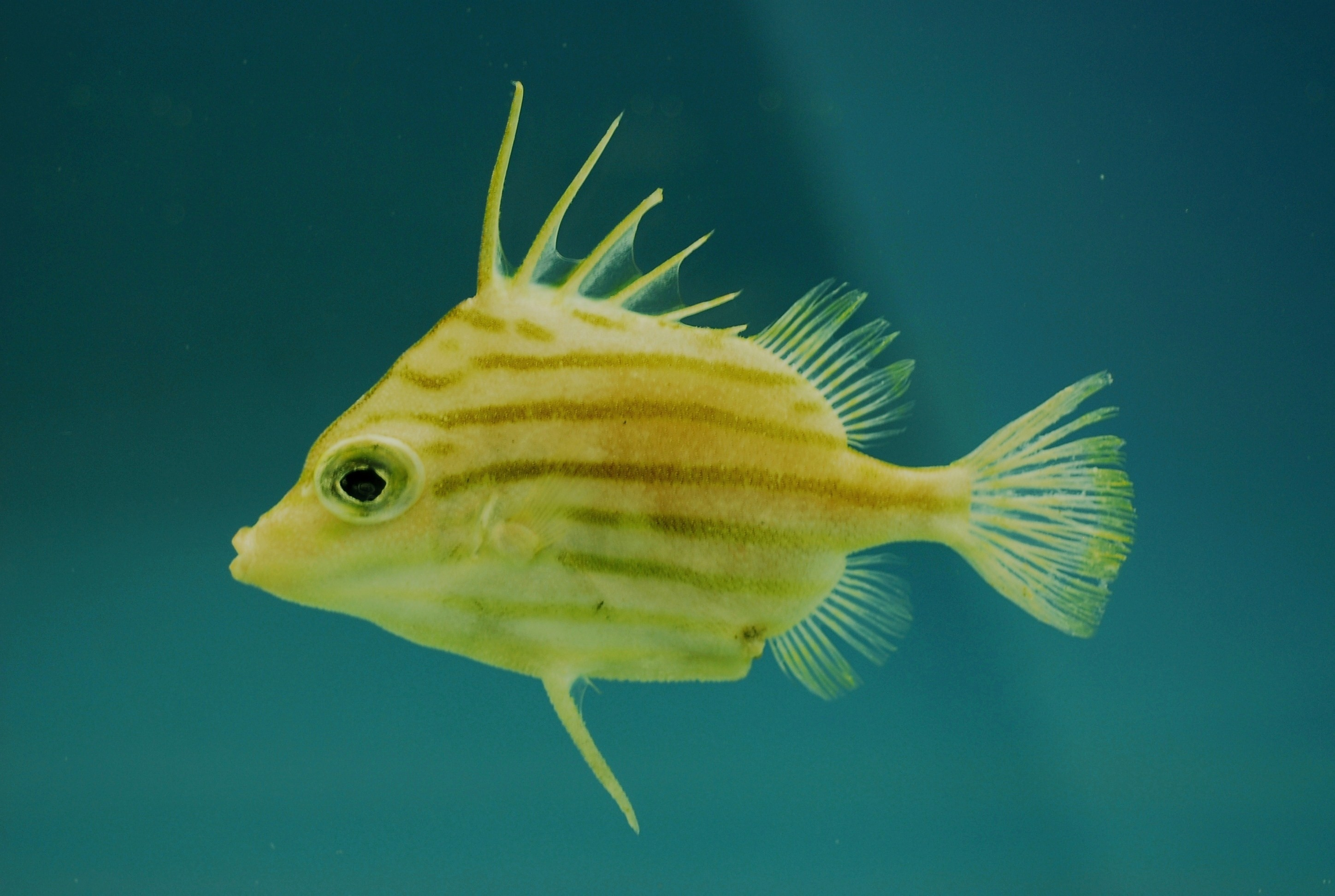
- Parahollardia lineata

Scientific classification
- Kingdom: Animalia
- Phylum: Chordata
- Class: Actinopterygii
- Division: Teleostei
- Order: Tetraodontiformes
- Family: Triacanthodidae
- Genus: Parahollardia; Fraser-Brunner, 1941

Type species
- Triacanthodes lineatus Longley, 1935

= Parahollardia =

Genus of fishes

Parahollardia is a genus of marine ray-finned fishes belonging to the family Triacanthodidae, the spikefishes. These demersal fishes are found in the Western Atlantic Ocean.

== Taxonomy ==
Parahollardia was first proposed as a monospecific genus in 1941 by the British ichthyologist Alec Fraser-Brunner, with Triacanthodes lineatus designated as its type species, and its only species. T. lineatus was first formally described in 1935 by the Canadian-American botanist and marine biologist William Harding Longley, with its type locality given as Tortugas in Florida. In 1968, the American ichthyologist James C. Tyler classified this genus, alongside Hollardia, in a new subfamily of the family Triacanthodidae, the Hollardiinae. The 5th edition of Fishes of the World classifies the family Triacanthodidae in the suborder Triacanthoidei in the order Tetraodontiformes.

== Etymology ==
Parahollardia means "close to Hollardia", an allusion to the close relationship of the two genera.

== Species ==
Parahollardia contains the following two valid species:

- Parahollardia lineata (Longley, 1935) (Jambeau)
- Parahollardia schmidti Woods, 1959

== Characteristics ==
Parahollardia spikefishes have rather deep, slightly compressed bodies with small mouths that open to the front and a short snout. There are two series of conical teeth on each jaw with between one and ten, typically two to four, irregularly positioned teeth outside of the outer row. The dorsal fin typically has its origin immediately to the rear of the gill opening's top corner. It is supported by six spines, the first being long and robust, and these decrease in size towards the rear. The spines can be locked upright and the soft rays are branched. There is a single large lockable spine in the pelvic fin as well. The lower surface of the scale-covered part of the pelvis is rounded. These fishes have thick, rough skin which is covered in many small scales, each one with tiny spines on it. These are small fishes with maximum published lengths of 20 cm (7.9 in) total length for P. lineata.

== Distribution and habitat ==
Parahollardia spikefishes are found in the Western Atlantic Ocean off the southeastern United States, the Gulf of Mexico and the Caribbean Sea. P. lineata is found at depths between 119 and 396 m (390 and 1,299 ft) over soft substrates close to the edge of the continental shelf and along the continental slope.
