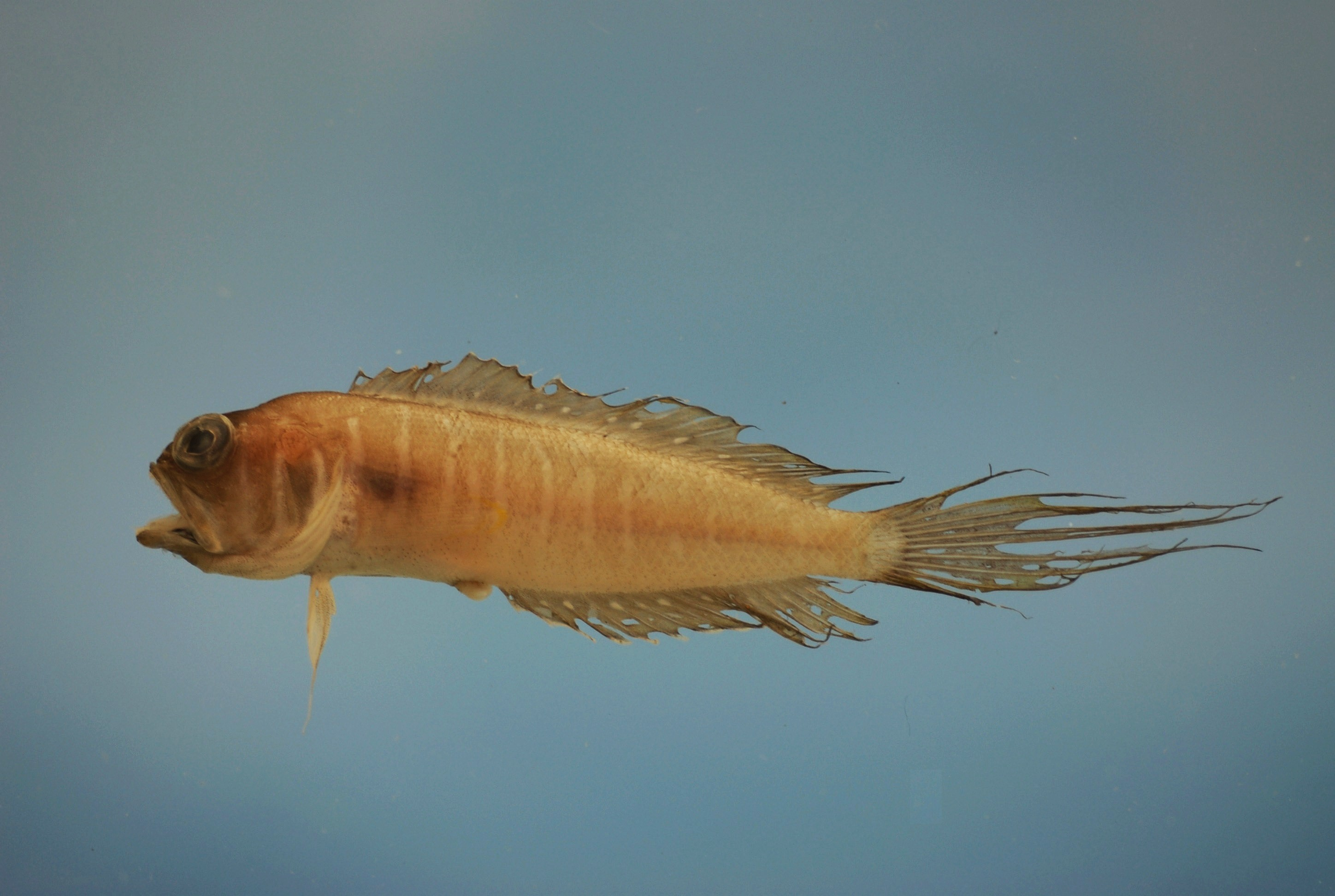
- Lonchopisthus micrognathus

Scientific classification
- Kingdom: Animalia
- Phylum: Chordata
- Class: Actinopterygii
- Order: Blenniiformes
- Family: Opistognathidae
- Genus: Lonchopisthus; T. N. Gill, 1862

Type species
- Opisthognathus micrognathus Poey, 1860

Synonyms
- Lonchistium G. S. Myers, 1935

= Lonchopisthus =

Genus of fishes

Lonchopisthus is a genus of jawfishes native to the tropical West Atlantic (Caribbean Sea) and East Pacific oceans (Gulf of California).

== Species ==
There are currently five recognized species in this genus:

- Lonchopisthus ancistrus Smith-Vaniz & Walsh, 2017 (Hook jawfish)
- Lonchopisthus higmani Mead, 1959
- Lonchopisthus lemur (G. S. Myers, 1935)
- Lonchopisthus micrognathus (Poey, 1860) (Swordtail jawfish)
- Lonchopisthus sinuscalifornicus Castro-Aguirre & Villavicencio-Garayzar, 1988 (Longtailed jawfish)
