= Pygmy jawfish =

Conservation status
- Data Deficient (IUCN 3.1)

Scientific classification
- Kingdom: Animalia
- Phylum: Chordata
- Class: Actinopterygii
- Order: Blenniiformes
- Family: Opistognathidae
- Genus: Anoptoplacus
- Species: A. pygmaeus

Binomial name
- Anoptoplacus pygmaeus Smith-Vaniz, 2017

Species of fish

The pygmy jawfish (Anoptoplacus pygmaeus) is a species of ray-finned fish from the family Opistognathidae, the jawfishes. It is the only member of the monospecific genus Anoptoplacus and the species and genus were described based on two specimens collected at depths of 240–260 metres (790–850 ft) at the Arrowsmith Bank off Yucatan, Mexico. As the name suggests, the pygmy jawfish is a very small species and many of its meristic characters are reduced compared to other jawfishes.
