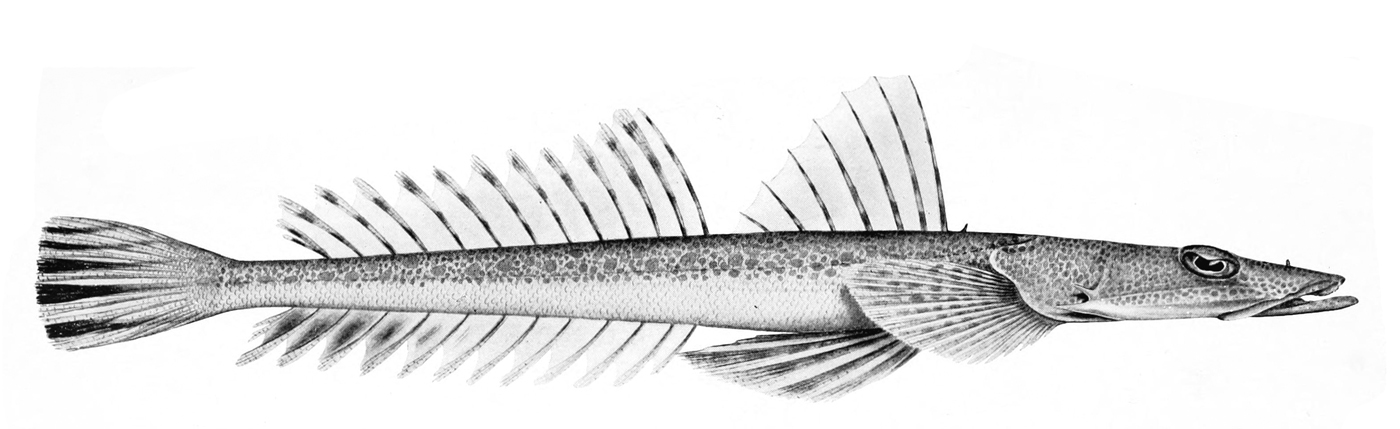
- Drawing of P. endrachtensis
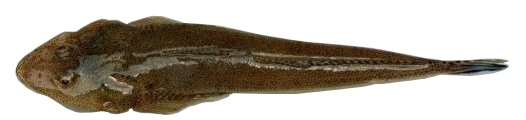
- Dorsal side of P. endrachtensis

Scientific classification
- Kingdom: Animalia
- Phylum: Chordata
- Class: Actinopterygii
- Order: Perciformes
- Family: Platycephalidae
- Genus: Platycephalus
- Species: P. endrachtensis

Binomial name
- Platycephalus endrachtensis (Quoy & Gaimard 1825)

Synonyms
- Platycephalus arenarius (Ramsay & Ogilby, 1886); Platycephalus arenaris (Ramsay & Ogilby, 1886)

= Platycephalus endrachtensis =

Species of fish

Platycephalus endrachtensis, or the bar-tailed flathead, bar-tail flathead, flag-tail flathead, northern sand flathead, northern-flag tailed flathead, sand flathead, western estuary flathead, is a predatory fish in the family Platycephalidae. It is found from the eastern Indian Ocean to the western Pacific, including in Australian and Indonesian waters up to 60 m (200 ft) deep over sand, at temperatures between 17 and 18 °C (63 and 64 °F). The maximum length of the species is 62 cm (24 in), and its weight up to 5 kg (11 lb). A popular angling species, the specific epithet endrachtensis refers to Eendrachtsland, an early Dutch name for Australia, with the suffix -ensis, meaning "place". Venomous spines are hazardous for safe handling.

== Description ==
Platycephalus endrachtensis has a sandy pale brown to tan colouration for camouflage. It is recognised by the black spots on its tail. The species can be differentiated from the similar P. australis from the two dark horizontal bars on the caudal fin and the yellow blotch on the middle fin, and from P. westraliae by a triangular lappet above the upper iris. It is found from the eastern Indian Ocean to the western Pacific, including in Australian and Indonesian waters up to 60 m (200 ft) deep over sand, at temperatures between 17 and 18 °C (63 and 64 °F). The maximum length of the species is 62 cm (24 in), and its weight up to 5 kg (11 lb). Unlike their relatives, they are not protandrous hermaphrodites.

=== Behaviour ===
P. endrachtensis is harmless to humans, is normally seen on the ocean floor, and if provoked, will burst from the sand quickly and settle again nearby.

== Range and habitat ==
The species ranges in Australian waters from Hamelin Bay, Western Australia, to St Helens, Tasmania, with the type locality in Shark Bay; it spawns in the Swan River estuary from late spring to the start of autumn. It is also found in Indonesia. They can be seen drifting on sand flats.

== Diet ==
The fish is an ambush predator, altering its skin colouring by "arranging [its] pigments within chromatophores" ( A.J. Hirst, 2014) and feeds on fish and sometimes large benthic crustaceans.

== Relations to humans ==
The species is edible, with the advised range about 42–55 cm (17–22 in), as any size bigger will cause harder and drier meat, and any smaller will contain too low levels of meat. They are protected in Australian waters, where it is illegal to keep specimens under 300mm, which males hardly reach.

The species was not generally considered to be overfished, however in 2022 it was classified as depleted in Tasmania. Concerns had been raised in 2014, leading to changes in Tasmanian size and bag limits in 2015.
