= Brooklynella sinensis =

Scientific classification
- Domain: Eukaryota
- Clade: Sar
- Superphylum: Alveolata
- Phylum: Ciliophora
- Class: Phyllopharyngea
- Order: Dysteriida
- Family: Hartmannulidae
- Genus: Brooklynella
- Species: B. sinensis

Binomial name
- Brooklynella sinensis Gong & Song, 2005

Species of ciliate

Brooklynella sinensis is a free-living ciliate species in the genus Brooklynella, described in 2005. The type location is a coast near Qingdao.
