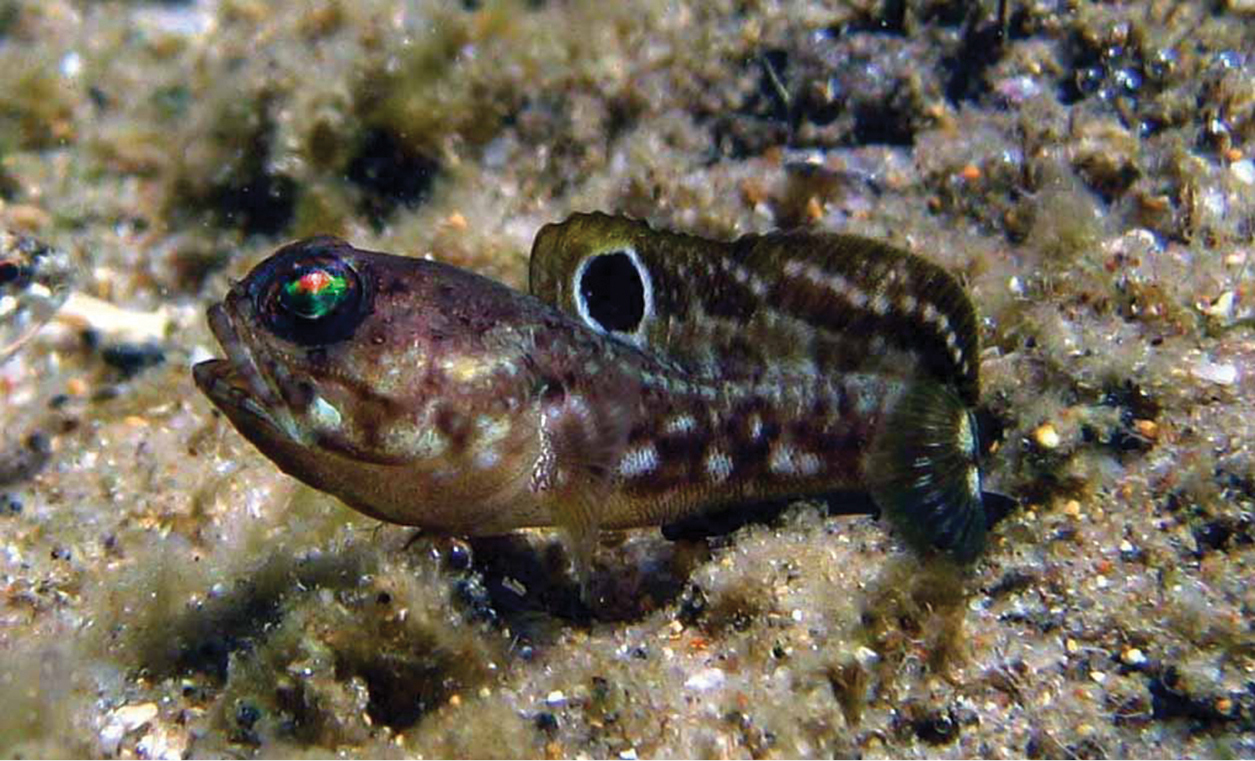

Scientific classification
- Domain: Eukaryota
- Kingdom: Animalia
- Phylum: Chordata
- Class: Actinopterygii
- Order: Blenniiformes
- Family: Opistognathidae
- Genus: Opistognathus
- Species: O. cuvierii

Binomial name
- Opistognathus cuvierii Valenciennes, 1836

Synonyms
- Gnathypops cuvieri (Valenciennes, 1836) (Note - Specific epithet misspelled)

= Bartail jawfish =

Species of fish

The bartail jawfish (Opistognathus cuvierii) is a species of jawfish known only from reefs in the Atlantic Ocean off the coast of southern Brazil. This species can reach a length of 11.4 centimetres (4.5 in) SL. The specific name honours the French naturalist Georges Cuvier (1769-1832).
