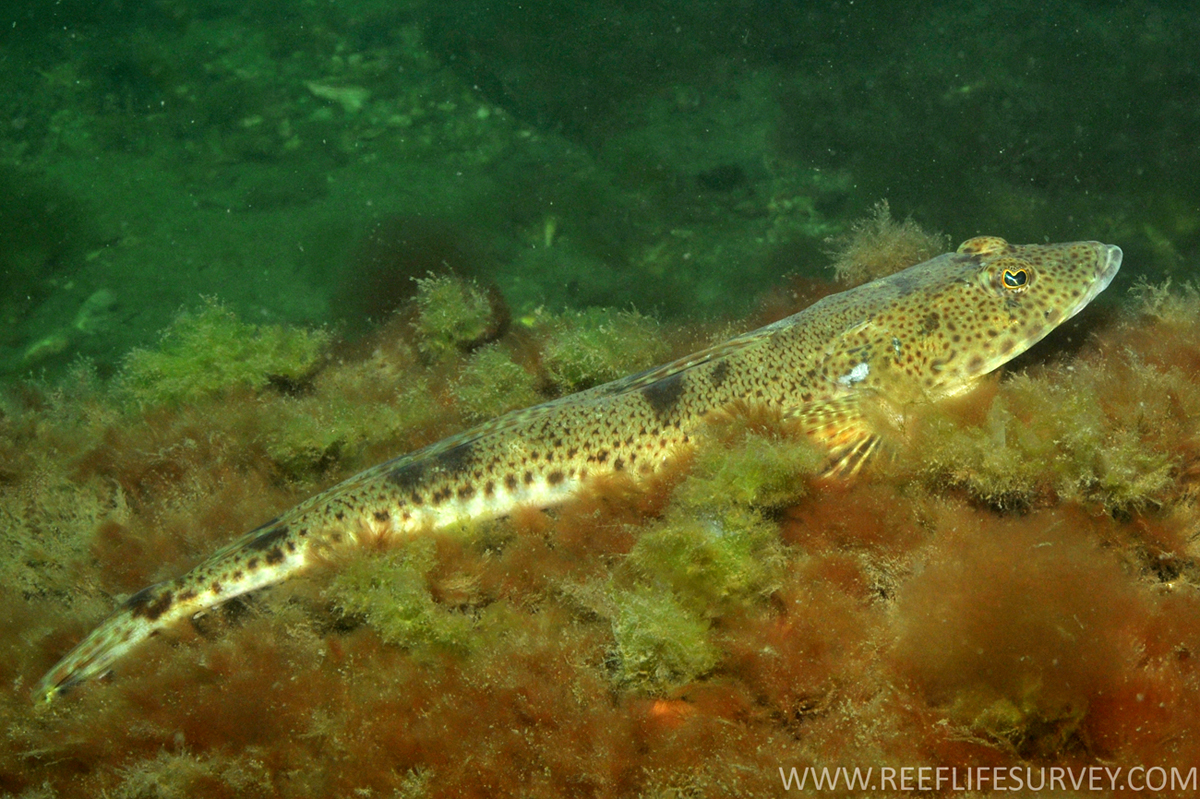
- Derwent River, Hobart
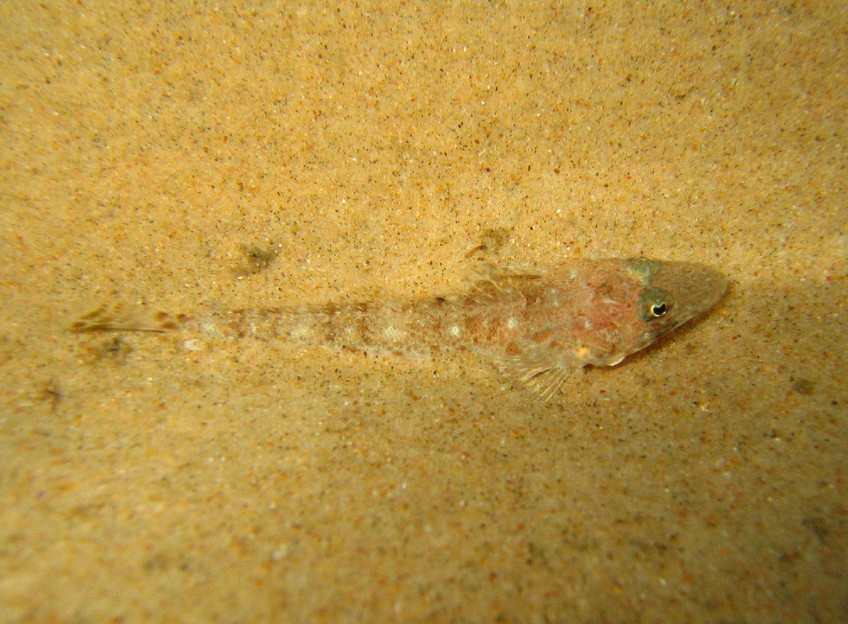
- juvenile

Scientific classification
- Kingdom: Animalia
- Phylum: Chordata
- Class: Actinopterygii
- Order: Perciformes
- Family: Platycephalidae
- Genus: Platycephalus
- Species: P. bassensis

Binomial name
- Platycephalus bassensis Cuvier 1829

Synonyms
- Platycephalus tasmanius Richardson, 1842

= Platycephalus bassensis =

Species of fish

Platycephalus bassensis the Southern sand flathead, Bass flathead, bay flathead, common flathead, sand flathead, sandy, sandy flathead, slimy flathead or yanks, is a species of marine ray-finned fish belonging to the family Platycephalidae, the flatheads. It is endemic to Australia.

They are bottom dwellers and are popular for their use in fish and chips. They are the most commonly caught recreational species in Tasmania.

== Taxonomy ==
Platycephalus bassensis was first formally described in 1829 by the French zoologist Georges Cuvier in volume 4 of the Histoire naturelle des poissons which he co-wrote with Achille Valenciennes. Cuvier gave the type locality as Western Port in Victoria. The specific name bassensis refers to the Bass Strait which the type locality is part of.

== Description ==
Platycephalus bassensis has and elongated and slightly flattened body with a large, flattened head which is just under one-third of the standard length and which has two clear bony ridges to the rear of the eye. The eyes are large and have a small lappet on the iris. It has a large mouth with small canine like teeth in the jaws and a broad patch of vomerine teeth with a thin band of palatine teeth. There are two robust spines on the angle of the preoperculum with lower spine being around two times longer than the upper spine. The first dorsal fin is short based, has 8 or 9 spines with the first spine being very short and is separate. The second dorsal fin has a moderately long base with 13 or 14, typically 14, soft rays with the first rays being the longest. The anal fin has a similar shape and is opposite the second dorsal fin, has a slightly longer base and contains 14 soft rays. The caudal fin is truncate. This species has a maximum published total length of 55 cm (22 in) and a maximum published weight of at least 3.1 kg (6.8 lb). The overall colour is sandy to pale brownish with a scattering of small pale to dark spots. There are 2 or 3 vague bands posteriorly along the back and a whitish belly. There is an irregular blotch on the lower lobe of the caudal fin which is frequently interrupted by the pale fin rays, the upper lobe is marked with large brown spots or blotches.

== Distribution and habitat ==
Platycephalus bassensis is endemic to southern Australia where it occurs from northern New South Wales to southwestern Western Australia, including around Tasmania. However, some authorities state that records west of the Great Australian Bight are misidentifications of P. westraliae. This species occurs on sandy, muddy or shelly substrates in shallow coastal bays down to depths of around 100 m (330 ft).

== Biology ==
=== Diet ===
Platycephalus bassensis is an ambush predator which buries itself in the sediment feeding on fishes and large benthic crustaceans.

=== Reproduction ===
Platycephalus bassensis has separate sexes and external fertilisation with spawning taking place in the late Austral winter up to mid December. The eggs and larvae are pelagic, the larvae settle on the bottom and then grow rapidly for their first 3 years, attaining a total length of 22 to 25 cm (8.7 to 9.8 in).

== Fisheries ==
Platycephalus bassensis is taken by commercial trawlers and Danish seiners offshore as well as by gillnet, beach seine and hook and line inshore. although the catch is not large It is a popular recreational quarry for anglers in estuarine and sheltered inshore waters in Victoria and Tasmania.
