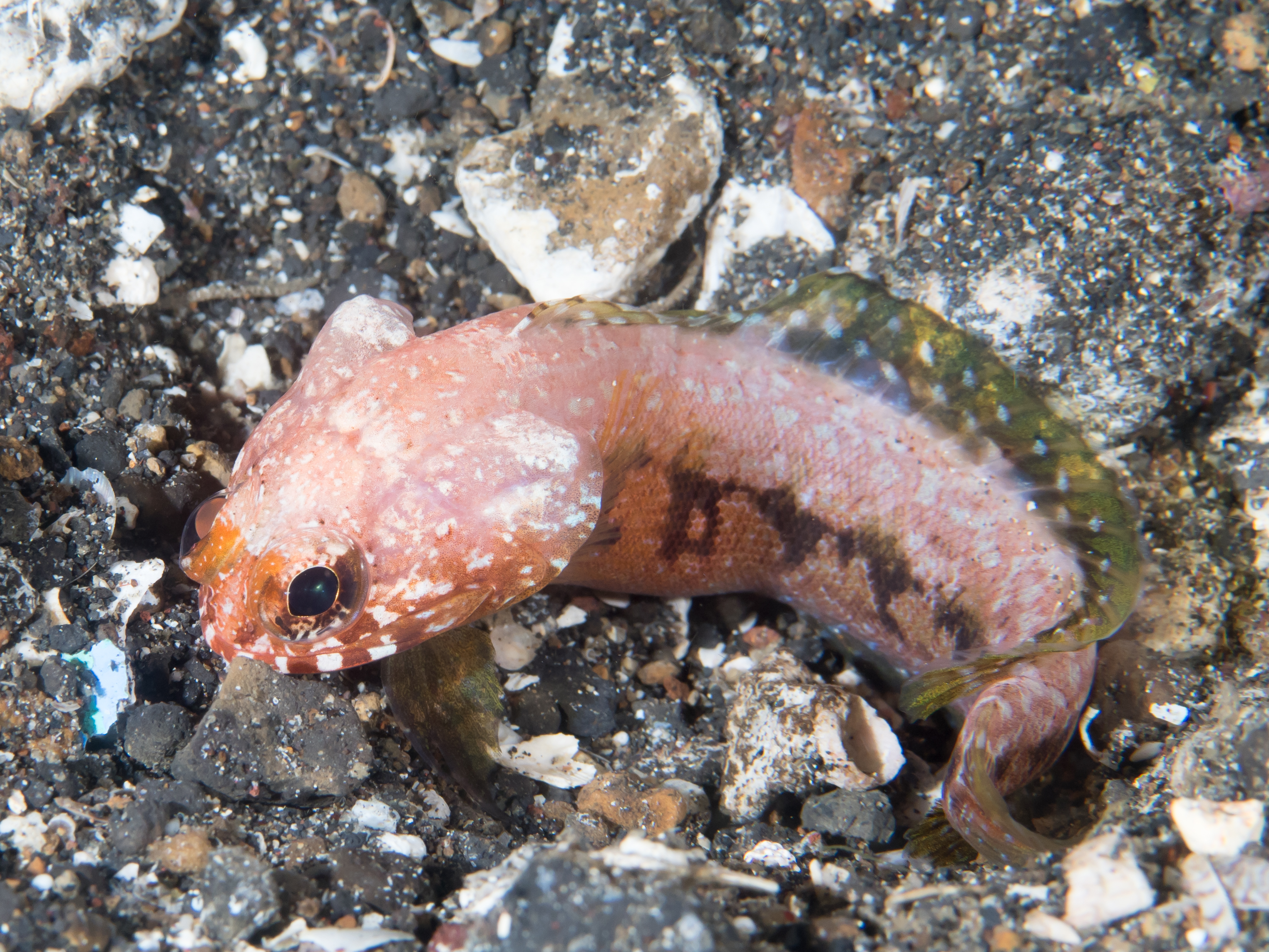
- Jawfish (Stalix sp.)

Scientific classification
- Domain: Eukaryota
- Kingdom: Animalia
- Phylum: Chordata
- Class: Actinopterygii
- Order: Blenniiformes
- Family: Opistognathidae
- Genus: Stalix; D. S. Jordan & Snyder, 1902

Type species
- Stalix histrio D. S. Jordan & Snyder, 1902

= Stalix =

Genus of fishes

Stalix is a genus of jawfishes native to the Indian Ocean and the western Pacific Ocean.

== Species ==
There are currently 12 recognized species in this genus:

- Stalix davidsheni Klausewitz, 1985
- Stalix dicra Smith-Vaniz, 1989 (Forked jawfish)
- Stalix eremia Smith-Vaniz, 1989 (Solitary jawfish)
- Stalix flavida Smith-Vaniz, 1989
- Stalix histrio D. S. Jordan & Snyder, 1902 (Harlequin jawfish)
- Stalix immaculata C. Y. Xu & H. Z. Zhan, 1980
- Stalix moenensis (Popta, 1922) (Muna jawfish)
- Stalix novikovi Prokofiev, 2015
- Stalix omanensis Norman, 1939 (Oman jawfish)
- Stalix sheni Smith-Vaniz, 1989
- Stalix toyoshio Shinohara, 1999
- Stalix versluysi (M. C. W. Weber, 1913) (Versluys' jawfish)
