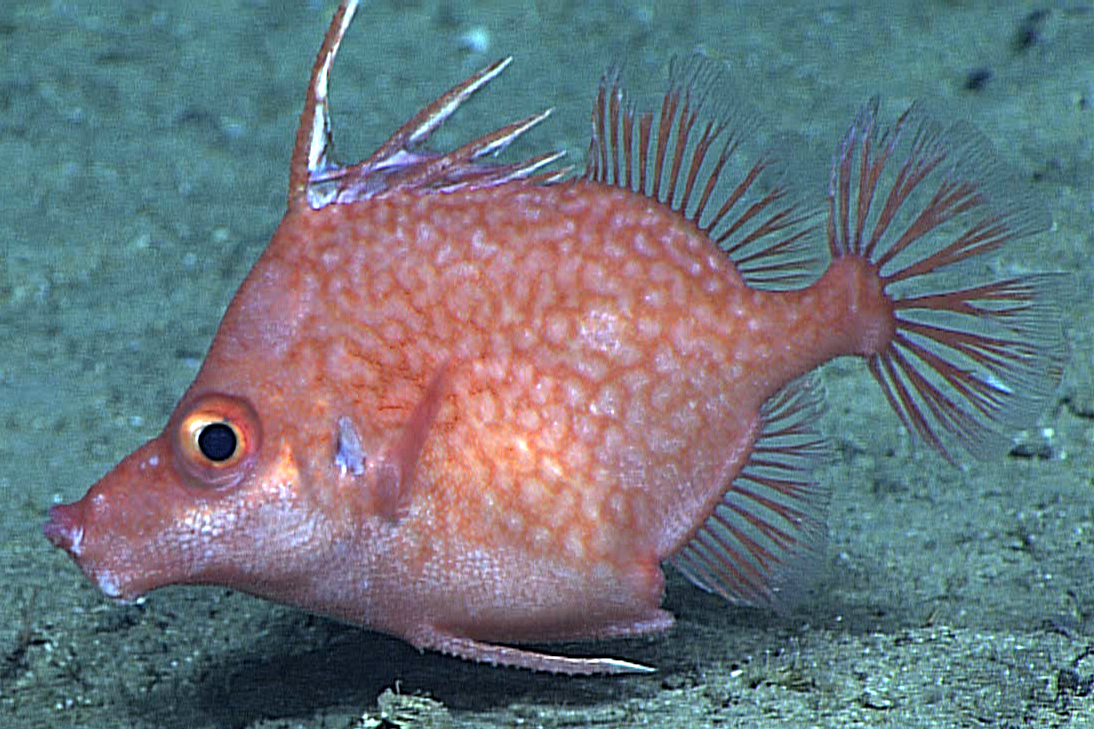
- Hollardia goslinei

Scientific classification
- Kingdom: Animalia
- Phylum: Chordata
- Class: Actinopterygii
- Order: Tetraodontiformes
- Suborder: Triacanthoidei
- Family: Triacanthodidae
- Subfamily: Hollardiinae
- Genus: Hollardia; Poey, 1861

Type species
- Hollardia hollardi Poey, 1861

= Hollardia =

Genus of fishes

Hollardia is a genus of marine ray-finned fishes belonging to the family Triacanthodidae, the spikefishes. These demersal fishes are found in the Western Atlantic Ocean, with one species being found in the Pacific Ocean.

== Taxonomy ==
Hollardia was first proposed as a monospecific genus in 1861 by the Cuban zoologist Felipe Poey when he described Hollardia hollardi as its only species, making that its type species by monotypy. H. hollardi was given a type locality of Havana. In 1968 the American ichthyologist James C. Tyler classified this genus, alongside Parahollardia, in a new subfamily of the family Triacanthodidae, the Hollardiinae. The 5th edition of Fishes of the World classifies the family Triacanthodidae in the suborder Triacanthoidei in the order Tetraodontiformes.

== Etymology ==
Hollardia is named in honour of the French physician and naturalist Henri Hollard, a pioneering worker in the study of the Plectognathi. The three species in the genus all have eponyms as their specific names, and the type species species epiphet further honours Hollard. H. meadi has a specific name which honours the American ichthyologist Giles W. Mead, while that of H. goslinei honours another American ichthyologist, William A. Gosline, who collected its holotype when he collected fishes killed by the eruption of Mauna Loa in 1950.

== Species ==
Hollardia contains the following three valid species:

- Hollardia goslinei J. C. Tyler, 1968 (Hawaiian spikefish)
- Hollardia hollardi Poey, 1861 (reticulate spikefish)
- Hollardia meadi J. C. Tyler, 1966 (spotted spikefish)

== Characteristics ==
Hollardia spikefishes have a deep, slightly compressed body with a small mouth which opens at the front. The teeth are conical in shape and there is a single series on each jaw. The gill opening is a short vertical slit in front of the base of the pectoral fin. The dorsal fin typically has its origin immediately to the rear of the gill opening's top corner. It is supported by six spines, the first being long and robust, and these descerase in size towards the rear. The spines can be locked upright and the soft rays are branched. There is a single large locakable spine in the pelvic fin as well. The lower surface of the scale-covered part of the pelvis is rounded. These fishes have thick, rough skin which is covered in many small scales, each one with tiny spines on it. These are small fishes, with maximum published lengths of 14.4 cm (5.7 in) standard length for H. goslinei, 11.5 cm (4.5 in) standard length for H. hollardi and 10 cm (3.9 in) total length for H. meadi.

== Distribution and habitat ==
Hollardia spikefishes are found in the Western Atlantic Ocean, two species from Massachusetts and Bermuda to Bahia in Brazil. The third species, H. goslinei, is found in the central west Pacific, and has been recorded from Hawaii, the Hawaiian ridge, Johnston Atoll, the Line Islands, the Mariana Islands, and the Coral Sea off Queensland. These are benthic fishes found at depths between 230 and 230 m (750 and 750 ft). In the Western Atlantic Ocean, H. harrodi is found on soft substrates, while H. meadi is found on rocky substrates.

== Coral Sea ==
Hollardia was recorded from new research in the Coral Sea in 2020 by Australian scientists using a robotic submarine which sent back pictures of what appears to be Hollardia hollardi, for the first time in an area not around Hawaii.
