= Brooklynella =

Scientific classification
- Domain: Eukaryota
- Clade: Sar
- Superphylum: Alveolata
- Phylum: Ciliophora
- Class: Phyllopharyngea
- Order: Dysteriida
- Family: Hartmannulidae
- Genus: Brooklynella; Lom & Nigrelli, 1970

Species
- B. hostilis Lom & Nigrelli, 1970; B. sinensis Gong & Song, 2005

Genus of ciliates

Brooklynella is a genus of ciliates in the family Hartmannulidae. It was described in 1970 as monotypic, containing only B. hostilis, but a second species B. sinensis was described in 2005.
