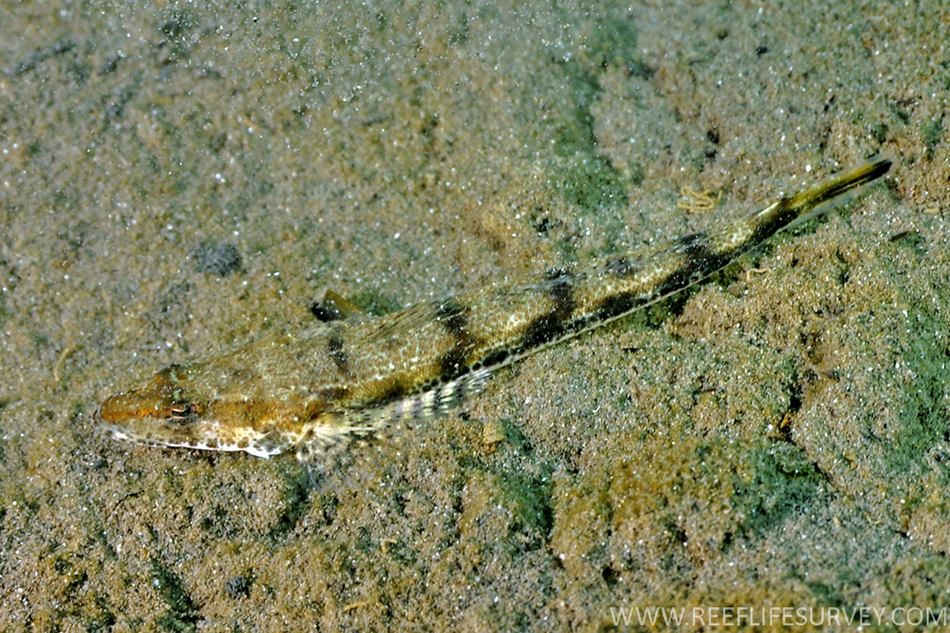
- A rock flathead (Platycephalus laevigatus) at Sandy Bay in the Derwent River, Hobart, Tasmania.

Scientific classification
- Kingdom: Animalia
- Phylum: Chordata
- Class: Actinopterygii
- Order: Perciformes
- Family: Platycephalidae
- Genus: Platycephalus
- Species: P. laevigatus

Binomial name
- Platycephalus laevigatus G. Cuvier, 1829

Synonyms
- Platycephalus proximus Castelnau, 1872

= Platycephalus laevigatus =

Species of fish

Platycephalus laevigatus, the rock flathead, black flathead, grass flathead, king flathead, marbled-bellied flathead, Port Albert flathead, smooth flathead or Southern rock flathead, is a species of marine ray-finned fish belonging to the family Platycephalidae, the flatheads. This species is endemic to Australia.

== Taxonomy ==
Platycephalus laevigatus was first formally described in 1829 by the French zoologist Georges Cuvier with the type locality given as Western Port in Victoria. The specific name laevigatus means "smoothed" and refers to the smooth head, lacking any spines or ridges, of this species.

== Description ==
Platycephalus laevigatus has a slightly flattened, elongate body with a small head which is also slightly flattened and is smooth, lacking ridges. The large eyes are positioned well forward on the head and have a single, lobed lappet. The mouth is large and has small pointed teeth in a band on the jaws with no enlarged canine-like teeth. The two spines on the peroperculum are moderately sized and are sited on its angle, the upper spine is the longer one. The first dorsal fin is short based and has 8 or 9 spines, usually 9, with the first spine being very small and separated. The second dorsal fin has a relatively long base as does the anal fin, the second dorsal fin has 14 or 15 soft rays while the anal fin between 13 and 15 soft rays. The caudal fin is rounded. The background colour is greenish to pale brown flathead marked with darker bars across the back. There is a broken stripe in the middle of the flanks and the tail is yellow with dark spots. Some specimens may be patterned with spots or marbling. The maximum published total length of this species is 50 cm (20 in).

== Distribution and habitat ==
Platycephalus laevigatus is endemic to Australia where it is found from Greenwell Point in New South Wales to Geographe Bay in Western Australia, its range extends around Tasmania too. It occurs on rocky reefs, sand and seagrass beds in coastal waters down to at least 20 m (66 ft).

== Biology ==
Platycephalus laevigatus, unlike many of its congeners prefers to resting on the hard substrate in areas of sea weed and seagrass, rather than burying itself in the sediment. It is carnivorous, feeding largely on fishes and on large benthic crustaceans. It is typically crepuscular and nocturnal.

== Fisheries ==
Platycephalus laevigatus is of minor importance to commercial fisheries and is landed in small numbers using beach seines and gillnets.

== Gallery ==
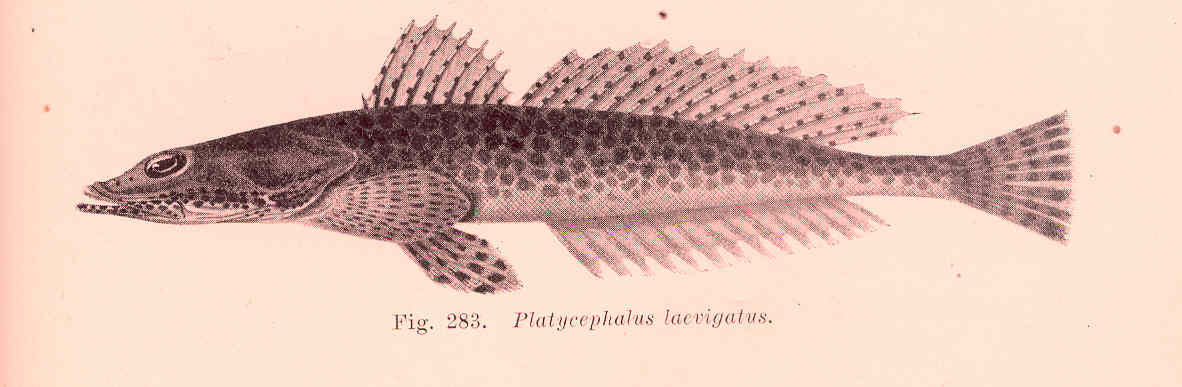
Illustration

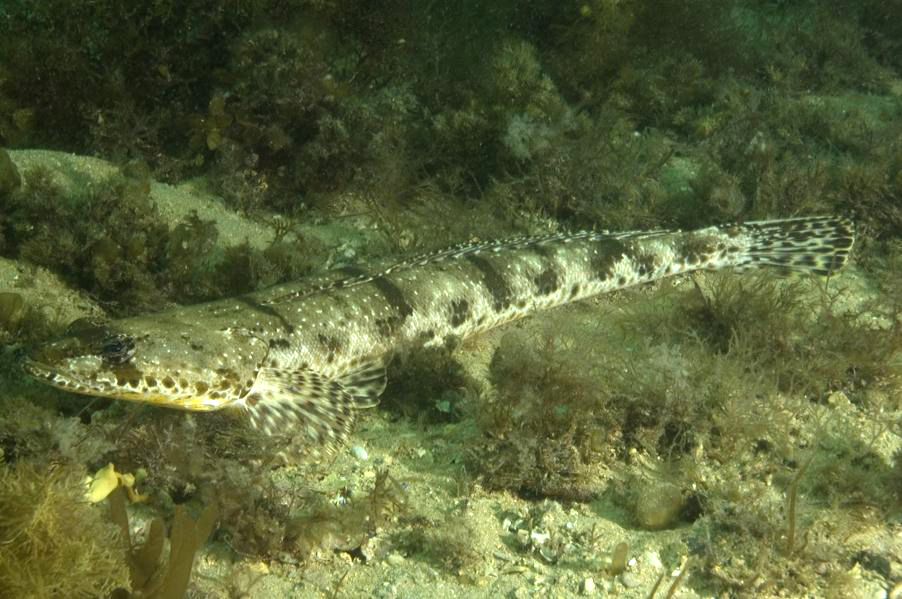
Portsea Pier, Port Phillip, Victoria
