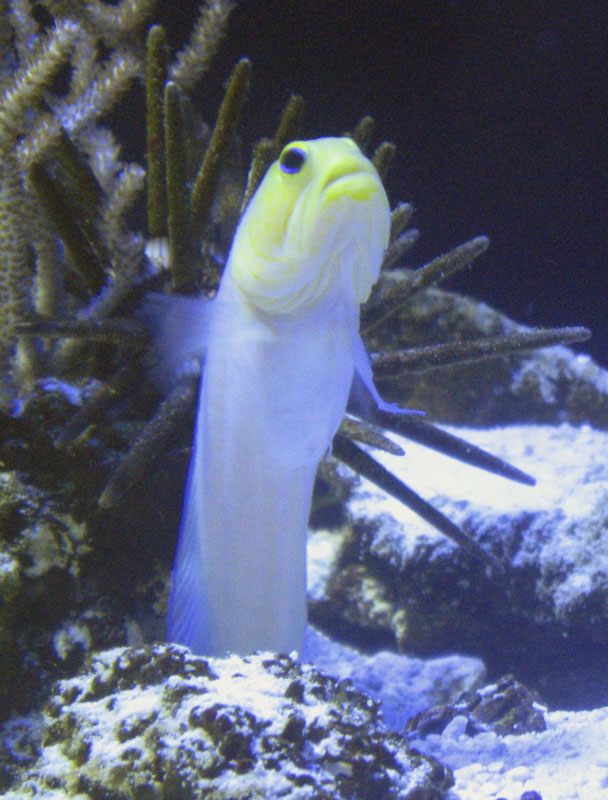

Conservation status
- Least Concern (IUCN 3.1)

Scientific classification
- Kingdom: Animalia
- Phylum: Chordata
- Class: Actinopterygii
- Order: Blenniiformes
- Family: Opistognathidae
- Genus: Opistognathus
- Species: O. aurifrons

Binomial name
- Opistognathus aurifrons (D. S. Jordan & J. C. Thompson, 1905)

Synonyms
- Gnathypops aurifrons D. S. Jordan & J. C. Thompson, 1905

= Yellowhead jawfish =

Species of fish

The yellowhead jawfish (Opistognathus aurifrons) is a species of jawfish native to coral reefs in the Caribbean Sea. They can be found at depths of from 3 to 40 metres (9.8 to 131.2 ft). The head and upper body are a light, but brilliant, yellow color slowly fading to a pearlescent blue hue. They can reach a length of 10 centimetres (3.9 in) TL. Yellowhead jawfishes are common in Florida. The Jawfishes live in rubble areas and sand in groups of up to 70 individuals.

Yellowhead jawfishes are usually found in shallows where materials are available for burrow construction. They remain near their relatively small territories, and are typically seen with only the head and upper section of their bodies protruding from their burrows, although they sometimes can be found hovering nearby. They are able to arrange material using their mouths, carrying sand, shells, or small rocks from one location to another.

O. aurifrons are mouthbrooders, with the male carrying the eggs in his mouth until they hatch.

Yellowhead jawfish have two different types of responses to intruders, flight or fight. The type of response depends on the type of incoming fish. During flight, the fish will swim away from the intruder and in go into their burrow, covering the opening with a large rock. During fight, the fish will spit sand or rocks at the intruder.

== In captivity ==
In the aquarium they feed on planktonic matter, commonly taking brine shrimp, mysis shrimp, and prepared frozen and pelleted fish food. When other fish come near their territories, they will open their jaws wide and try to warn them off, but they rarely attack. They are one of the most docile jawfish towards fish of their kind, and can be kept in small groups of 1 individual per 10 gallons.
