= Brooklynella hostilis =

Scientific classification
- Domain: Eukaryota
- Clade: Diaphoretickes
- Clade: SAR
- Clade: Alveolata
- Phylum: Ciliophora
- Class: Phyllopharyngea
- Order: Dysteriida
- Family: Hartmannulidae
- Genus: Brooklynella
- Species: B. hostilis

Binomial name
- Brooklynella hostilis Lom & Nigrelli, 1970

Species of single-celled organism

Brooklynella hostilis is a parasite of marine fish, found in wild fish, farmed fish and aquariums. It is kidney-bean shaped, and approximately 60–80 μm (0.0024–0.0031 in) long, with bands of cilia. It reproduces by binary fission.

B. hostilis causes the disease Brooklynellosis, also known as slime-blotch or clownfish disease. In marine aquariums, B. hostilis infects most teleosts (ray finned fishes). B. hostilis feeds on dead skin cells and can cause severe damage to gills. Affected fish have a gray discoloration, and may breathe abnormally fast or abnormally slow. The infection can cause sloughing of skin, and congestion of the gills. The parasite spreads rapidly, and can easily transfer to a new host. Formalin is an effective treatment.
