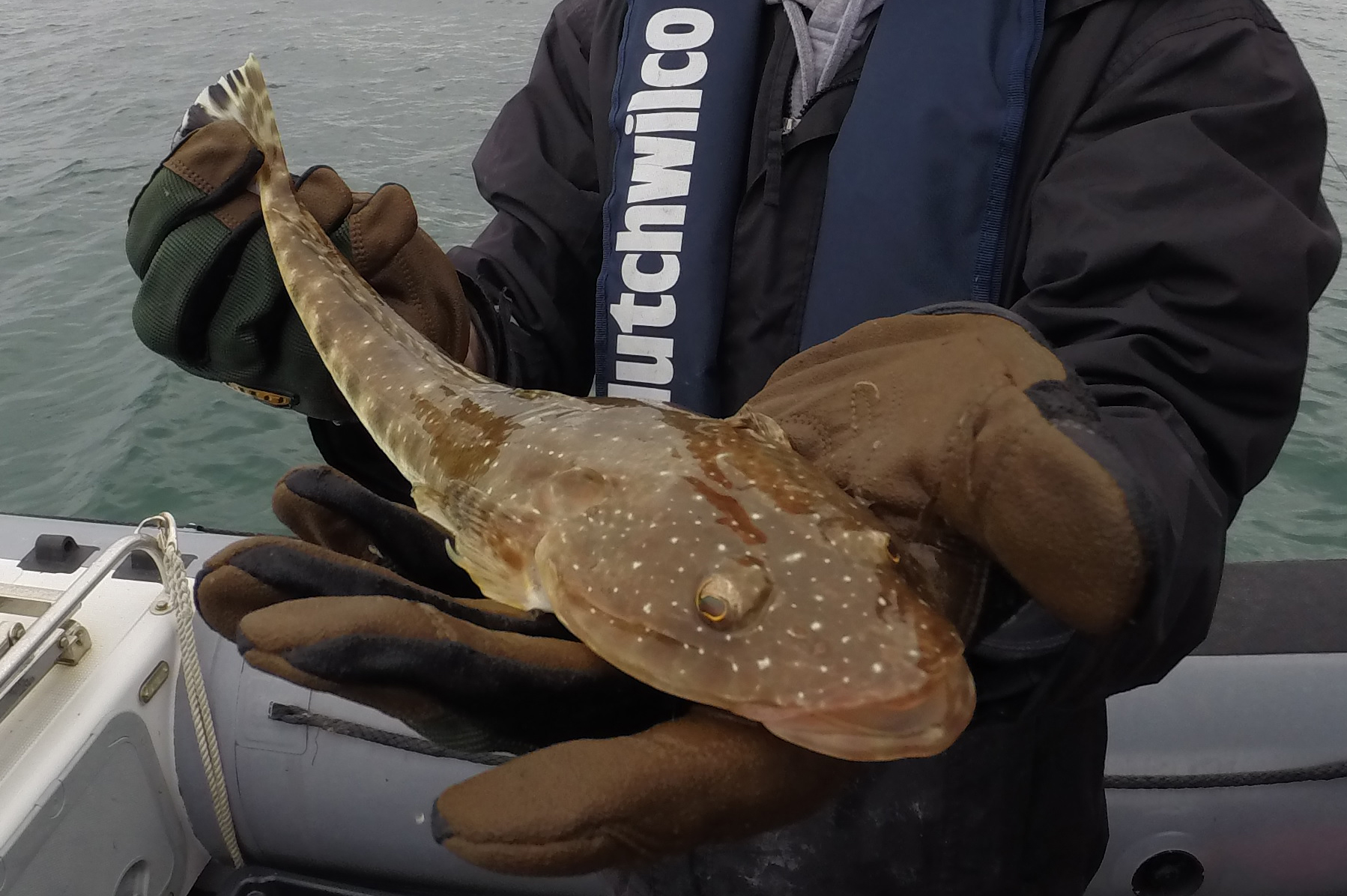

Scientific classification
- Kingdom: Animalia
- Phylum: Chordata
- Class: Actinopterygii
- Order: Perciformes
- Family: Platycephalidae
- Genus: Platycephalus
- Species: P. caeruleopunctatus

Binomial name
- Platycephalus caeruleopunctatus A. McCulloch, 1922

= Platycephalus caeruleopunctatus =

Species of fish

Platycephalus caeruleopunctatus, the bluespotted flathead, drift flathead, Eastern blue-spot flathead, longnose flathead, red flathead, red spotted flathead, sand flathead or yank, is a species of predatory ray-finned fish belonging to the family Platycephalidae, the flatheads. Bluespotted flathead are a marine species and are predominantly found in offshore waters and coastal bays on the east coast of Australia where they are almost exclusively found on marine sand.

== Ecology ==
Flatheads are notable for their unusual body shape, upon which their hunting strategy is based. Flathead are dorsally compressed, meaning their body is wide but flattened and very low in height. Both eyes are on the top of the flattened head, giving excellent binocular vision to attack overhead prey. The effect is somewhat similar to flounder. In contrast to flounder however, flathead are much more elongated, the tail remains vertical, and the mouth is large, wide and symmetrical. Bluespotted flathead use this body structure to hide in sand (their body colour changes to match their background), with only their eyes visible. While it has not been observed, it is thought that like other flathead species, the bluespotted flathead uses this camouflage to ambush small prey species. The species can also be an active swimmer and will actively chase prey without resorting to ambush.

The bluespotted flathead can be distinguished from other flathead by its scattered blue spots, elongated dark blotches on the tail which become larger from the top of tail to the bottom. The lower preopercular spine is distinctly longer than the upper.

Bluespotted flathead are commonly encountered on marine sands in south-eastern Australia and are rarely found in other habitats. They reach up to 68 cm in length and it is thought that both males and females reach this maximum size.

== Fishing ==
Both commercial and recreational fishers target bluespotted flathead. Often they are confused by fishers with the numerous other species of flathead caught in the same areas.
