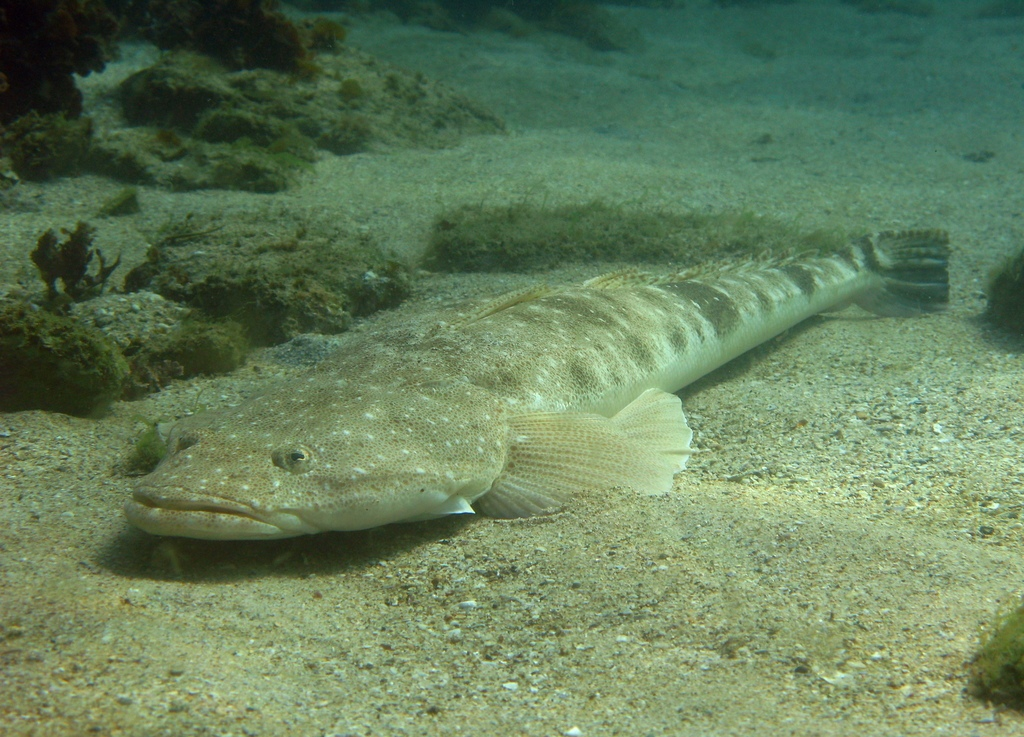

Scientific classification
- Kingdom: Animalia
- Phylum: Chordata
- Class: Actinopterygii
- Division: Teleostei
- Order: Perciformes
- Family: Platycephalidae
- Genus: Platycephalus
- Species: P. fuscus

Binomial name
- Platycephalus fuscus G. Cuvier, 1829

Synonyms
- Platycephalus cinereus Günther, 1872; Platycephalus mortoni Macleay, 1883

= Platycephalus fuscus =

Species of fish

Platycephalus fuscus, the dusky flathead or black flathead, (literally translating from Ancient Greek as "flat-head dusky") is a large predatory fish and the largest member of the family Platycephalidae. Dusky flathead are a largely estuarine species and are found in estuaries, estuarine lakes and coastal bays on the east coast of Australia, from Cairns in Queensland to the Gippsland Lakes in Victoria. They occur over sand, mud, gravel and seagrass and can inhabit estuarine waters up to the tidal limit.

== Morphology ==
Flathead are notable for their unusual body shape, upon which their hunting strategy is based.

Flathead are dorsally compressed, meaning their body is wide but flattened and very low in height. Both eyes are on the top of the flattened head, giving excellent binocular vision in order to attack overhead prey. The effect is somewhat similar to flounder. In contrast to flounder however, flathead are much more elongated, the tail remains vertical, and the mouth is large, wide and symmetrical. Flathead use this body structure to hide in sand (their body colour changes to match their background), with only their eyes visible, and explode upwards and outwards to engulf small fish and prawns as they drift over the hidden flathead.

Flathead showing its lateral body profile and colouration.

Flathead showing its dorsal surface and flattened head.

Dusky flathead colour varies from sandy with brown spots and blotches to dark brown/black with white spots. They have a distinctive black spot on their caudal fins. Dark bars are often visible across the rear of the body. The preopercular spines on each side of the head are very sharp and slightly venomous, and should be avoided when handling the fish.

== Ecology ==
Dusky flathead, Platycephalus fuscus

Dusky flathead are the largest of the many species of flathead found in Australia, and the most commonly caught. Dusky flathead have very rarely been caught at sizes up to 12–15 kg and lengths up to 1.3 metres, but average size is 0.5–1.5 kg and 40–50 cm. Typically a fish of estuaries and estuarine lakes, dusky flathead are rarely found in other habitats.

The diet of dusky flathead is typically composed of smaller fish and prawns. According to NSW DPI Fisheries research, dusky flathead grow relatively quickly. In fact, dusky flathead can reach 40cm total length after just three years. Female dusky flathead mature at around 55cm total length while males mature much earlier at about 22cm total length. Only female fish attain the larger sizes. Breeding is reported to occur in mid to late summer around estuary mouths. A recent study (Pollock 2014) shows that the sex of dusky flathead is determined at the juvenile stage, and that there is no sex inversion from male to female.

== Fishing ==
Dusky flathead are a popular species for commercial and recreational fishing in eastern Australia. They readily take baits and minnow lures, and on such lures are good fighters. As of November 2021 they have proven to be very vulnerable to fishing techniques using jigged soft plastic lures. In the face of heavy fishing pressure and more effective techniques, a largely catch and release approach from anglers is essential nowadays to conserve dusky flathead. Fishermen must release dusky flathead over 70 cm, with the reason that they are important large breeding females.

The hypothesis that dusky flathead over 70 cm are "important large breeding females" is questionable. A study by Pollock (2014) shows that the vast majority of eggs produced by the annual spawning aggregation come from the mid-size females (50 cm–60 cm), but more importantly the large females over 70 cm are often reproductively senescent—that is they have degenerate ovaries in which the eggs are breaking down or have broken down, and are not shed. A study is currently underway in northern New South Wales which is finding at most of the large female flathead (>75 cm) also have degenerate ovaries during the early spawning period (Nov/Dec), whereas the mid-size females have healthy ovaries with developing yolky eggs.
