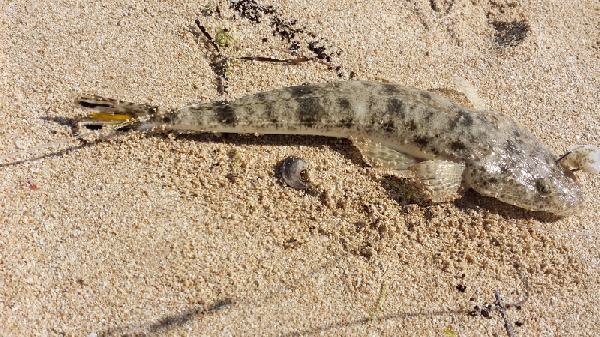

Conservation status
- Data Deficient (IUCN 3.1)

Scientific classification
- Kingdom: Animalia
- Phylum: Chordata
- Class: Actinopterygii
- Division: Teleostei
- Order: Perciformes
- Family: Platycephalidae
- Genus: Platycephalus
- Species: P. indicus

Binomial name
- Platycephalus indicus (Linnaeus, 1758)

Synonyms
- Platycephalus spathula Bloch, 1795; Cottus insidiator Forsskål, 1775; Cottus madagascariensis Lacépède, 1801; Callionymus indicus Linnaeus, 1758

= Bartail flathead =

Species of fish

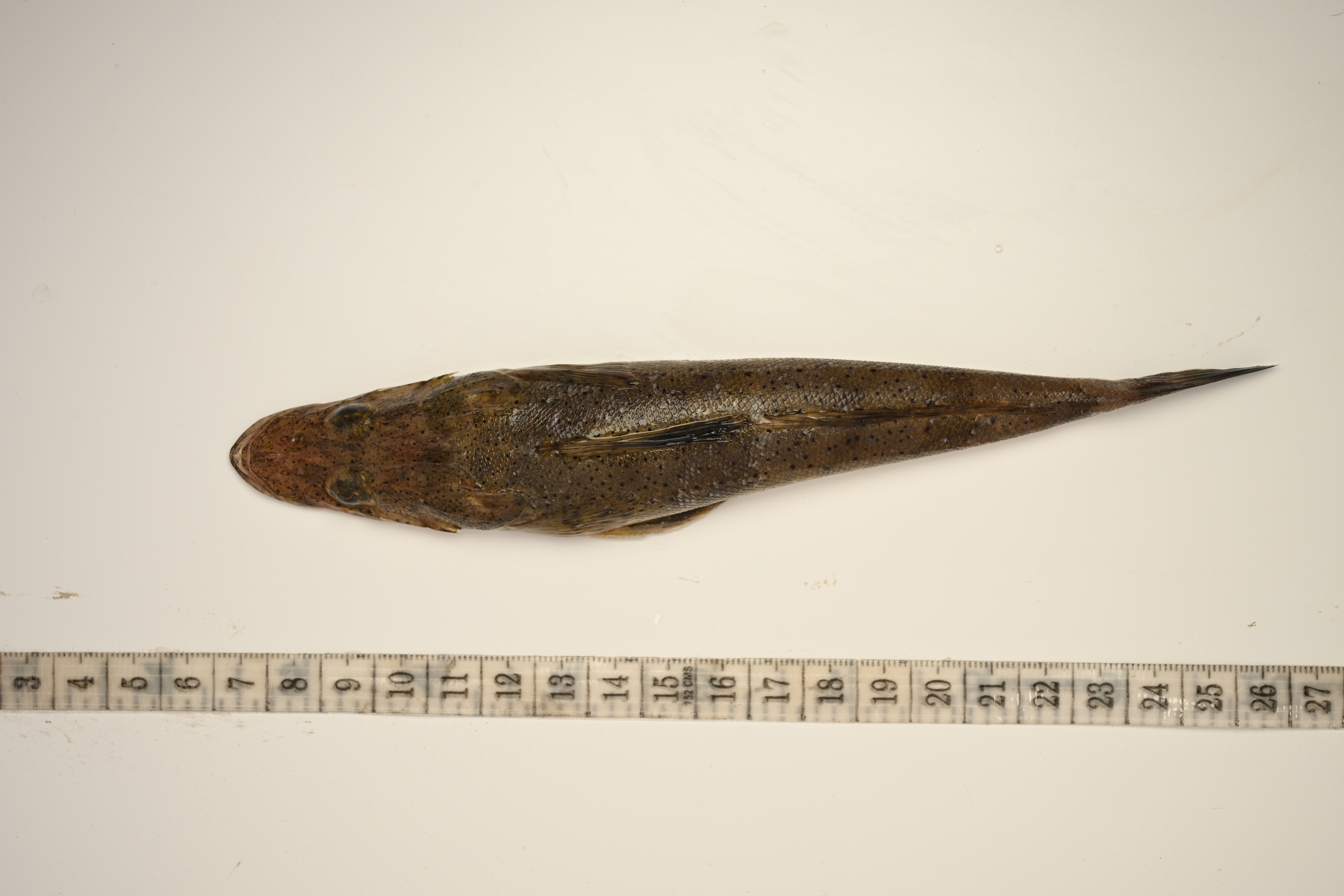
Platycephalus indicus

The bartail flathead (Platycephalus indicus), also known as the Indian flathead, gobi or Indo-Pacific flathead, is a species of largely marine ray-finned fish belonging to the family Platycephalidae, the flatheads. This species is found in the Indian Ocean and the Western Pacific Ocean, and has invaded the eastern Mediterranean Sea.

== Taxonomy ==
The bartail flathead was first formally described in 1758 as Callionymus indicus by Carl Linnaeus in the 10th edition of Systema Naturae with the type locality given as "Asia". In 1795 the German physician and naturalist Marcus Elieser Bloch described Platycephalus spathula from Tranquebar in India creating the genus Platycephalus. In 1917 David Starr Jordan and Barton Warren Evermann designated Bloch's P. spathula as the type species of Platycephalus, P. spathula is now considered to be a junior synonym of Linnaeus's C. Indicus.

=== Species complex ===
There are indications that Platycephalus indicus sensu lato is a species complex, the Australian bartail flathead (P. australis) has been recognised as a valid species, and there is evidence that some of the records of this species from the waters of Japan and China are of two undescribed species, although a 2017 study confirmed the presence of P. indicus in this region.

=== Etymology ===
The specific name indicus likely refers to the Indian Ocean.

== Description ==
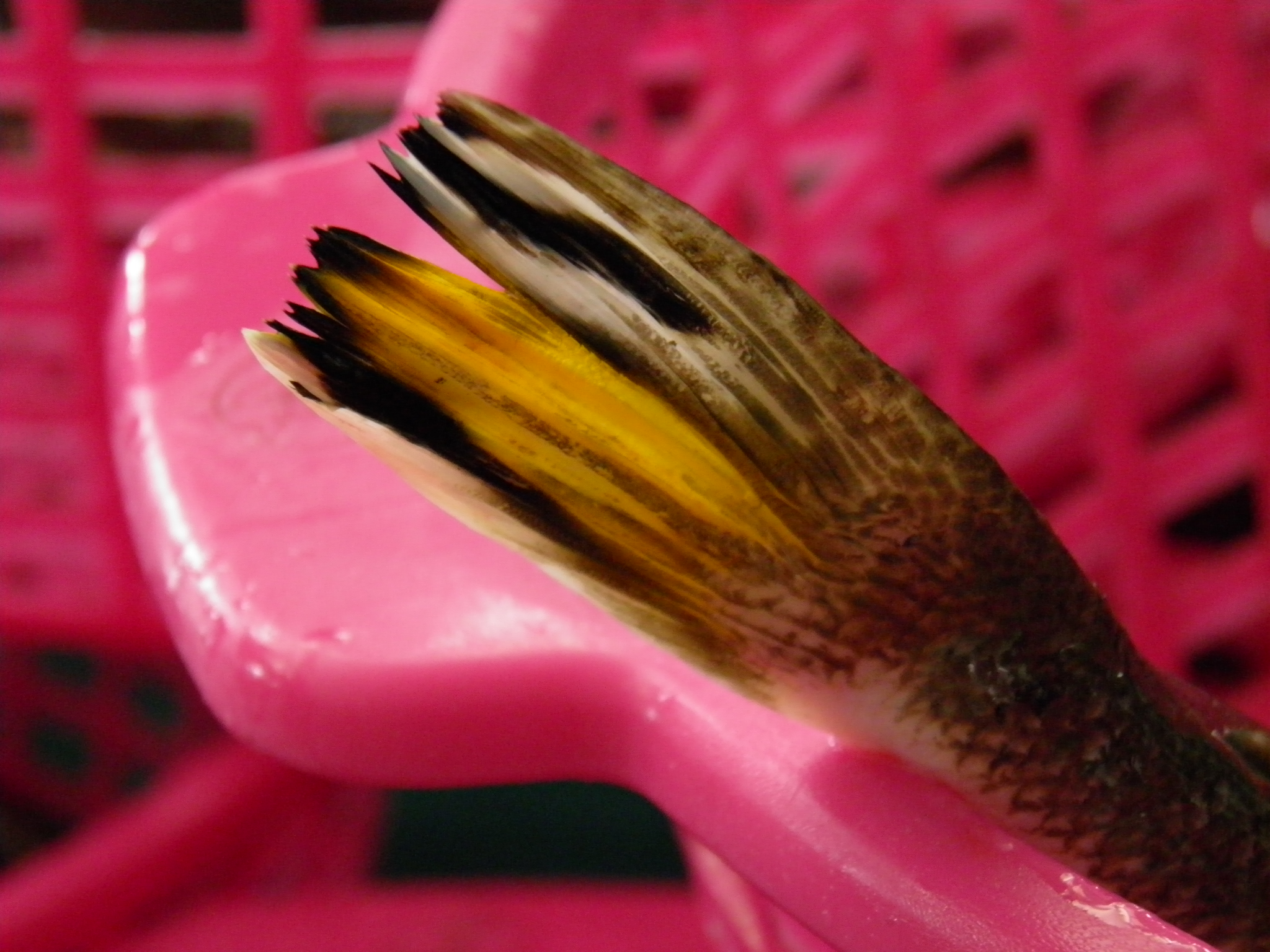
Caudal fin

The bartail flathead has a depressed head that is smooth, apart from low parieto-occipital, scapular and preopercular ridges, which are neither spined nor serrated. There is a short, blunt spine in front of the eye. The preoperculum terminates in 2 strong, slightly upturned spines. There are canine like vomerine teeth, with a single obvious row of canine-like teeth on the palatine while the jaws have wide bands of villiform teeth. The first dorsal fin has a short separate first spine and a further 7-9 spines, the second dorsal fin has 13 soft rays, as does the anal fin. The rear margins of the second dorsal fin and anal fin have deep incisions in the membrane between the rays. The overall colour is brownish, there are 8 or 9 indistinct dusky bands across the back. The top of the head is finely mottled with more or less roundish spots each enclosed in a pale ring. the lower body is yellowish. the fins, other than the caudal fin, have rows of dusky spots on the fin rays while the caudal fin has a longitudinal black band in its middle, with 2 diagonal black bands above and below this. This species has a maximum published total length of 100 cm (39 in), although 60 cm (24 in) is more typical, and a maximum published weight of 3.5 kg (7.7 lb).

== Distribution and habitat ==
The bartail flathead has a wide Indo-Pacific distribution from the Red Sea and the eastern coast of Africa east to the Philippines, north to Japan and south to Papua New Guinea. It was previously thought to occur in northern Australia but this population has now been recognised as a separate species P. australis. It is recorded on occasions in the Levantine waters of the Mediterranean Sea since 1953, a likely entry from the Suez Canal.

The bartail flathead is found at depths between 20 and 200 m (66 and 656 ft) over sand and mud substrates, often close to reefs or seagrass beds, and the juveniles have been known to enter the freshwater reaches of rivers.

== Biology ==
The bartail flat head is an ambush predator feeding on fishes and crustaceans.

== Fisheries ==
The bartail flathead is caught using handlines and seine nets in shallow waters and by trawls at depths to 30 m (98 ft), typically less. It is considered to be a good food fish and the flesh is sold fresh. It is also an ingredient in Chinese traditional medicine.
