= Achille Valenciennes =

French zoologist, ichthyologist, and malacologist

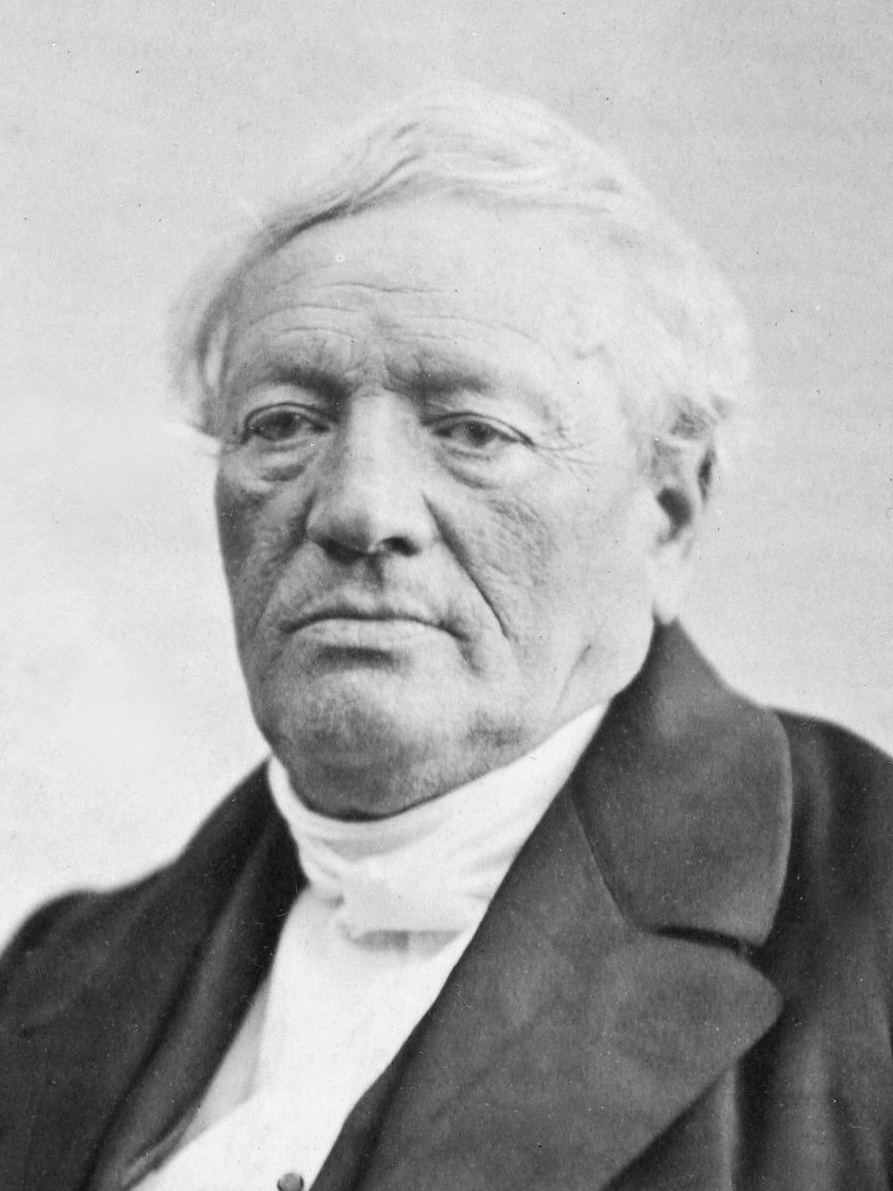
- Born: 9 August 1794; Paris, France
- Died: 13 April 1865 (aged 70); Paris, France
- Scientific career
- Fields: Parasitology; Zoology
- Institutions: Muséum national d'histoire naturelle
- Academic advisors: Georges Cuvier
- Author abbrev. (zoology): Valenciennes

Achille Valenciennes (9 August 1794 – 13 April 1865) was a French zoologist.

Valenciennes was born in Paris, and studied under Georges Cuvier. His study of parasitic worms in humans made an important contribution to the study of parasitology. He also carried out diverse systematic classifications, linking fossil and current species.

He worked with Cuvier on the 22-volume "Histoire Naturelle des Poissons" (Natural History of Fish) (1828–1848), carrying on alone after Cuvier died in 1832. In 1832, he succeeded Henri Marie Ducrotay de Blainville (1777–1850) as chair of Histoire naturelle des mollusques, des vers et des zoophytes at the Muséum national d'histoire naturelle.

Early in his career, he was given the task of classifying animals described by Alexander von Humboldt (1769–1859) during his travels in the American tropics (1799 to 1803), and a lasting friendship was established between the two men. He is the binomial authority for many species of fish, such as the bartail jawfish. He also described the marine surgeon-fish species Zebrasoma gemmatum (originally as Acanthurus gemmatus) in 1835.

Working in the scientific field of herpetology, Valenciennes described two new species of reptiles.

The organ of Valenciennes, a part of the anatomy of a female of the genus Nautilus, the purpose of which remains unknown, is named after him.

A species of lizard, Anolis valencienni, is named after him.

== See also ==
- Taxa named by Achille Valenciennes
