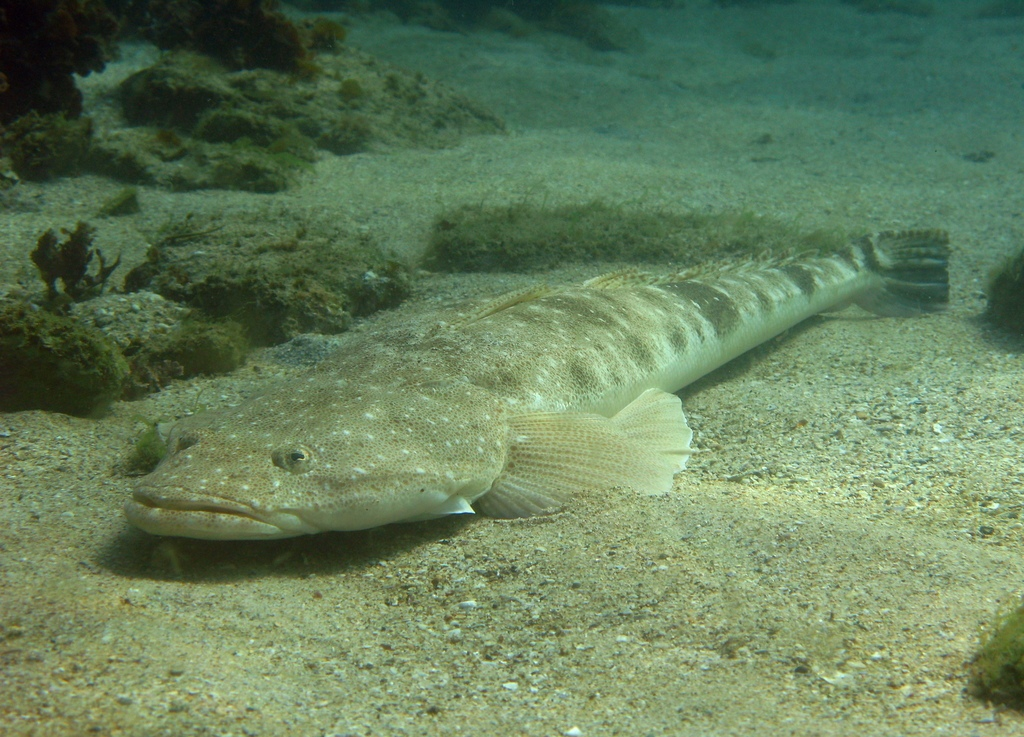
- Platycephalus fuscus

Scientific classification
- Kingdom: Animalia
- Phylum: Chordata
- Class: Actinopterygii
- Division: Teleostei
- Order: Perciformes
- Family: Platycephalidae
- Genus: Platycephalus; Bloch, 1795

Type species
- Callionymus indicus Linnaeus, 1758

Synonyms
- Cacumen Whitley, 1931; Calliomorus Lacépède, 1800; Colefaxia Whitley, 1935; Longitrudis Whitley, 1931; Neoplatycephalus Castelnau, 1872; Planiprora Whitley, 1931; Trudis Whitley, 1931

= Platycephalus =

Platycephalus Temporal range: Ypresian to Recent 56–0 Ma

Genus of fishes

Platycephalus is a genus of mostly marine, demersal ray-finned fish belonging to the family Platycephalidae. They are found in the eastern Mediterranean, the Indian Ocean and western Pacific Ocean.

== Taxonomy ==
Platycephalus was first proposed as a genus in 1795 by the German physician and naturalist Marcus Elieser Bloch with Callionymus indicus, which had been described in 1748 by Carl Linnaeus from "Asia", as its type species. This genus is classified within the family Playtcephalidae, the flatheads which the 5th edition of Fishes of the World classifies within the suborder Platycephaloidei in the order Scorpaeniformes.

=== Etymology ===
The genus name Platycephalus means "flat head" an allusion to the wide flattened head of these fishes which leads to the English common name flathead.

=== Species ===
There are currently 19 recognised species in this genus:

- Platycephalus angustus Steindachner, 1866 (Steindachner's flathead)
- Platycephalus aurimaculatus L. W. Knapp, 1987 (Toothy flathead)
- Platycephalus australis Imamura, 2015 (Australian bartail flathead)
- Platycephalus bassensis Cuvier, 1829 (Sand flathead)
- Platycephalus caeruleopunctatus McCulloch, 1922 (Blue-spotted flathead)
- Platycephalus chauliodous L. W. Knapp, 1991 (Big-tooth flathead)
- Platycephalus conatus Waite & McCulloch, 1915 (Deep-water flathead)
- Platycephalus cultellatus J. Richardson, 1846
- Platycephalus endrachtensis Quoy & Gaimard, 1825 (Yellow-tail flathead)
- Platycephalus fuscus Cuvier, 1829 (Dusky flathead)
- Platycephalus grandispinis Cuvier, 1829 (Long-spined flathead)
- Platycephalus indicus (Linnaeus, 1758) (Bar-tail flathead)
- Platycephalus laevigatus Cuvier, 1829 (Black flathead)
- Platycephalus marmoratus Stead, 1908 (Marbled flathead)
- Platycephalus micracanthus Sauvage, 1873
- Platycephalus orbitalis Imamura & L. W. Knapp, 2009 (Western Australian flathead)
- Platycephalus richardsoni Castelnau, 1872 (Tiger flathead)
- Platycephalus speculator Klunzinger, 1872 (Southern bluespotted flathead)
- Platycephalus westraliae (Whitley, 1938)

== Characteristics ==
Platycephalus flatheads have no less than two spines on the preoperculum. with the lowerer spine being the longest. The upper lobe of the caudal fin does not have an elongated filament. They have between 7 and 10 spines in the first dorsal fin and more than 13 soft rays in the second dorsal fin. They are further separated by having a single band of vomerine teeth rather than two distinct patches. The largest species is P. fuscus with a maximum published total length of 120 cm (47 in) while the smallest is P. orbitalis with a maximum published total length of 33.3 cm (13.1 in).

== Distribution ==
Platycephalus flatheads are found in the Indo-West Pacific region, mostly around Australia where 16 of the 19 species in the genus are found. One species, the bartail flathead (P. indicus), has entered the eastern Mediterranean Sea from the Red Sea through the Suez Canal as a Lessepsian migrant.
