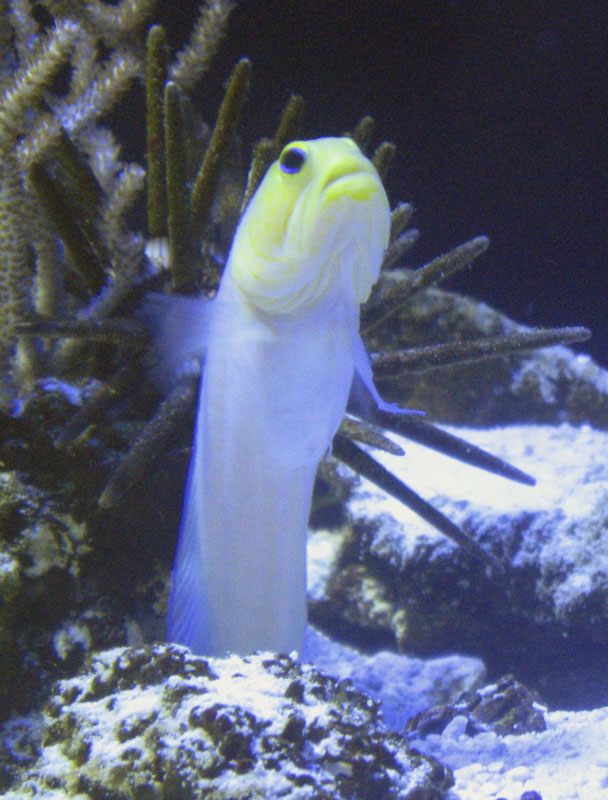
- Yellow-headed jawfish, Opistognathus aurifrons

Scientific classification
- Kingdom: Animalia
- Phylum: Chordata
- Class: Actinopterygii
- Order: Blenniiformes
- Family: Opistognathidae; Bonaparte, 1835

= Opistognathidae =

Family of ray-finned fish

Opistognathidae, the jawfishes, are a family of fishes in the order Blenniiformes. The family includes about 80 species. They are native to warmer parts of the Atlantic, Pacific and Indian Oceans, where they are found from the shallows to depths of a few hundred meters. The species level taxonomy is complex and the family includes several undescribed species.

Physically similar to blennies, most jawfish species are small fishes (up to 10 cm or 3.9 in) with an elongated body plan. A few species are larger, such as for example the aptly named giant jawfish (O. rhomaleus), which reaches about 0.5 m (1 ft 8 in). Their heads, mouths, and eyes are large in size relative to the rest of their bodies. Jawfishes possess a single, long dorsal fin with 9–12 spines and a caudal fin that can be either rounded or pointed.

Jawfishes typically reside in burrows they construct in sandy substrate. They will stuff their mouths with sand and spit it out elsewhere, slowly creating a tunnel. Using the protection of these burrows, these fish will hover, feeding on plankton or other small organisms, ready to dart back in at the first sign of danger. They are territorial of the area around their burrows.

With the exception of the blue-spotted jawfish O. rosenblatti, Jawfishes are mouthbrooders, meaning their eggs hatch in their mouths, where the newborn fry are protected from predators.

The gestation period varies between species. Gold-specs jawfish (Opistognathus randalli) typically keep their clutch of eggs for 8–10 days before hatching.

== Genera ==
The following four genera are classified under the family:

- Anoptoplacus Smith-Vaniz, 2017
- Lonchopisthus T.N. Gill, 1862
- Opistognathus Cuvier, 1816
- Stalix D.S. Jordan & Snyder, 1902
