= William Harding Longley =

American botanist (1881–1937)

- Born: 1881; Nova Scotia, Canada
- Died: 1937 (aged 55–56); Baltimore, Maryland
- Education: Acadia University; Yale University
- Scientific career
- Fields: Biology; Botany
- Workplaces: Goucher College, Carnegie Institution of Science

William Harding Longley (1881–1937) was a Canadian-American botanist and marine biologist. Born in Nova Scotia, Longley received his education at Acadia University and Yale University. He spent his career from 1911 to 1937 as a professor of biology and botany at Goucher College in Towson, Maryland. He died at Johns Hopkins Hospital on March 10th, 1937.

Longley's most notable scientific work focused on the coloration and patterning of tropical reef fish. He conducted this research with the support of the Carnegie Institution's Dry Tortugas Laboratory in Washington, D.C., where he served as director from 1922 to 1937. His investigations also encompassed the distribution and the evolution of the tropical reef fish.

Longley's passion for plant life extended beyond marine biology. He conducted extensive botanical studies in various locations, including Hawaii, Samoa, the Tortugas islands, and the Pacific region. His research also involved examining plant specimens housed in European and American museums.

== See also ==
- Category:Taxa named by William Harding Longley
