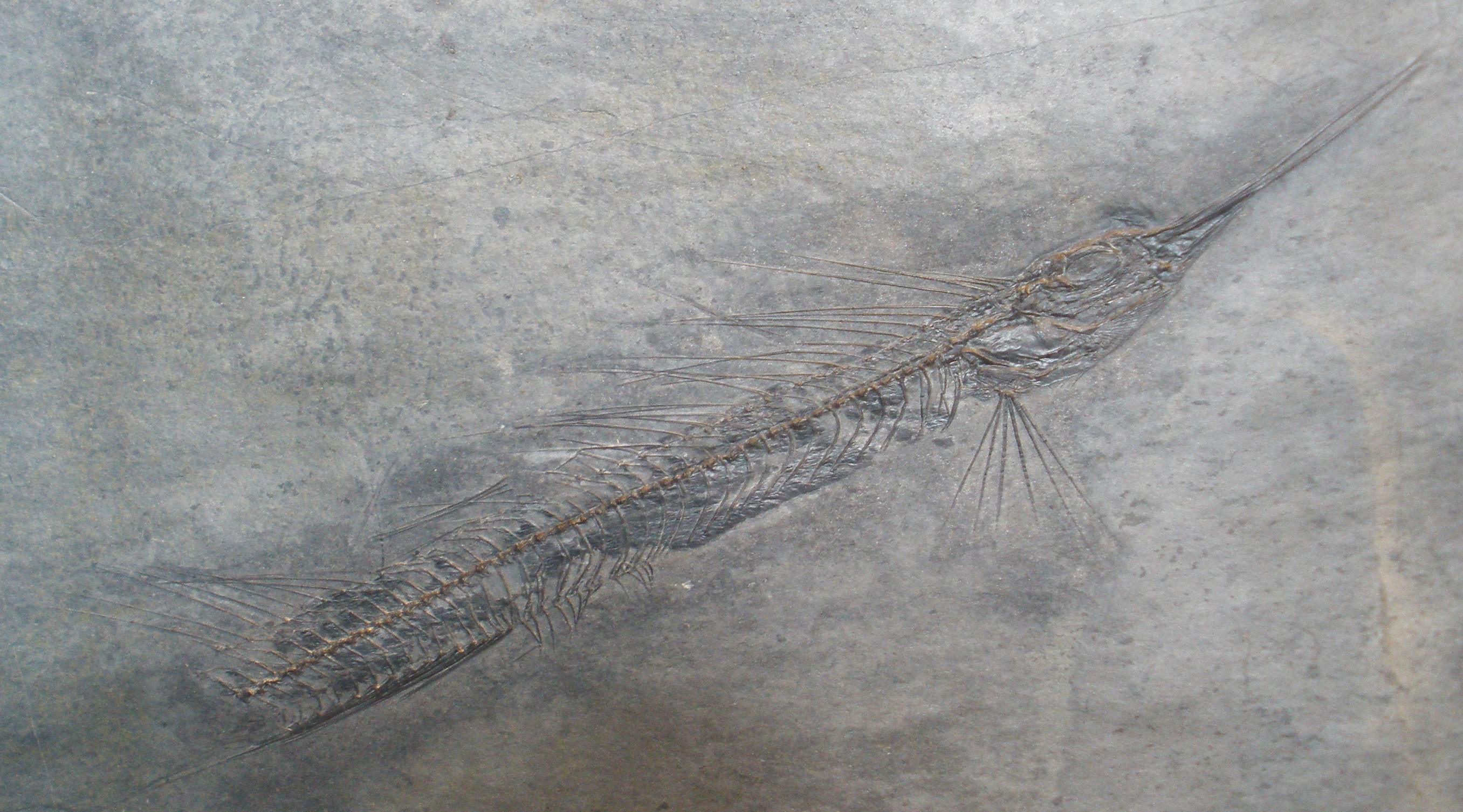
- Fossil skeleton of Palaeorhynchus

Scientific classification
- Kingdom: Animalia
- Phylum: Chordata
- Class: Actinopterygii
- Order: Carangiformes
- Suborder: Menoidei
- Superfamily: Xiphioidea
- Family: †Palaeorhynchidae; Günther, 1880

Type genus
- †Palaeorhynchus de Blainville, 1818

Genera
- †Aglyptorhynchus (?); †Homorhynchus; †Palaeorhynchus; †Pseudotetrapturus

= Palaeorhynchidae =

Palaeorhynchidae Temporal range: Ypresian–Chattian

Extinct family of ray-finned fishes

Palaeorhynchidae is an extinct family of billfish that ranged from the Eocene to Oligocene of Europe and Asia; most known members of the family being found in what was the Paratethys Sea. Members of the family are generally similar to modern billfish in body shape, having elongated bodies, though differ in aspects of the skull and postcrania. Unlike modern billfish, most members of the family possessed both long upper and lower jaws. Along with this, they only had a single dorsal fin that would have run down almost the entire length of the body.

== Classification ==
The exact placement of Palaeorhynchidae and billfish as a whole has been questioned for decades with morphological data originally placing the extinct and extant members in the family Scombridae. The more common placement, especially in more recent years, is to place them in a number of families within Scombroidei. It wasn't until the early 1990s-2000s that papers by Orrell and coauthors in 2006 along with Carpenter and coauthors in 1995 would place all billfish into their own suborder, Xiphioidei. Phylogenies containing the generally expected groups of billfish place palaeorhynchids at the base of the suborder with more recent papers such as a 2019 publication by Otero placing the family closer to another early genus of small billfish, Hemingwaya, than in past publications.

The main arguments of taxonomic placement in more recent years is in regard to the genus Aglyptorhynchus. The fish was first placed in Palaeorhynchidae in a paper by Fierstine in 2006 due to the a similar downwards-facing flange on the maxilla, a diagnostic trait of the family. The author would later place Aglyptorhynchus and Palaeorhynchus in a new subfamily named Aglyptorhynchinae within a manuscript with Harry Fierstine and coauthors publishing the subfamily under the name Palaeorhynchinae in 2008. The name Aglyptorhynchinae would be later used in a 2009 publication by Fierstine and Weems in reference to a monotypic subfamily within Palaeorhynchidae. However, more recent papers such as the 2025 publication by Rust and coauthors would argue against the Palaeorhynchidae classification of the genus, instead placing it closer to another fossil billfish, Xiphiorhynchus. Another large palaeorhynchid, Pseudotetrapturus, was also brought up as potentially also being more closely related to Xiphiorhynchus though it was removed from the phylogeny due to it being an unstable taxon. Below are the cladograms from the papers mentioned.

Carpenter et al. (1995)

- Xiphioidea
  - Palaeorhynchidae
  - - - Hemingwayidae
      - Istiophoridae
    - - - Xiphiorhynchidae
        - Xiphiidae
      - - Blochiidae

Otero (2019)

- - Acanthocubium
  - - - - Palaeorhynchus
        - Homorhynchus
      - - Hemingwaya
    - - Xiphiorhynchus
      - - Aglyptorynchus hakataramea
        - - - Markaira
            - Istiophorus
          - - Xiphias
            - - Loancorhychus catrillancai
              - Blochius longirostris

Rust et al. (2025)

- - Acanthocubium solandri
  - - - - Palaeorhynchus
        - Homorhynchus
      - - Hemingwaya sarissa
    - - - - Xiphias gladius
        - - Loanchorhynchus catrillancai
          - Blochius longirostris
      - - NPC CD.993
        - - - Makaira nigricans
            - Istiophorus spp.
          - - Zealandorhynchus fordycei
            - - Xiphiorhynchus
              - - Aglyptorhynchus hakataramea
                - - Cylindracanthus rectus (Hogburn specimen)
                  - Aglyptorhynchus columbianus

== Description ==
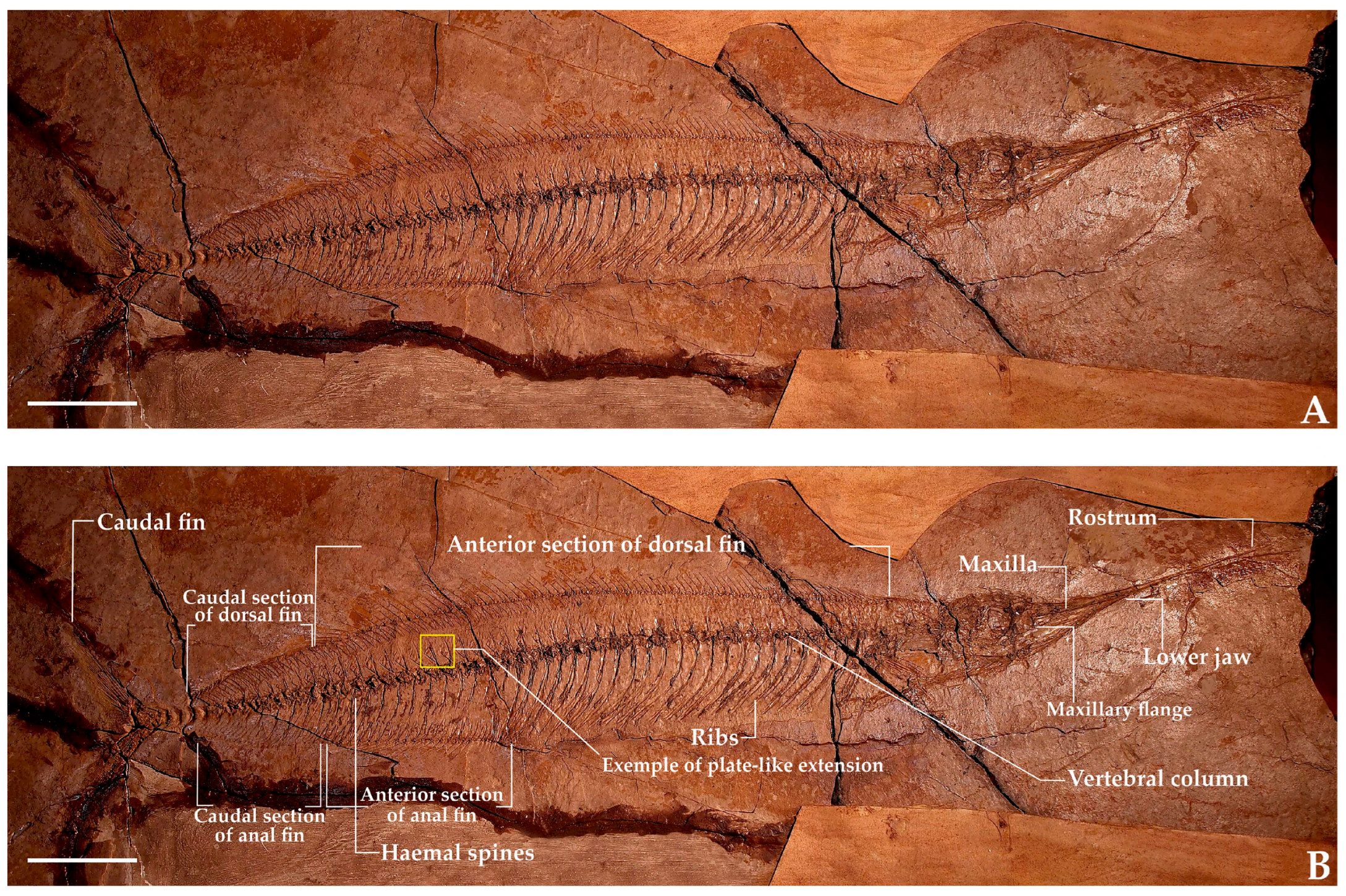
A specimen of Homorhynchus colei showing an upper jaw that is much longer than the lower one, more similar to modern billfish.

Members of Palaeorhynchidae were generally medium-sized fish with taxa such as Homorhynchus colei having a standard length of 375 millimetres (14.8 in). The main exception to this is the genus Pseudotetrapturus from the Oligocene of the Caucasus that has been estimated to have a total body length of about 4 metres (13 ft).

=== Skull ===
The main diagnostic trait in the skulls of Palaeorhynchidae when compared to other groups of billfish is the downturned, spade-like flange on the maxilla. Similar to some modern billfish like marlins, palaeorhynchids possessed rows of teeth on both the upper and lower jaws with the teeth of juveniles being most likely larger than those seen in adults proportionally. The locations of the mouth where these teeth are present on the upper jaw does differ between genera with them being absent on the premaxilla of Palaeorhynchus and only present on the maxilla in Pseudotetrapturus. While the upper and lower jaws of palaeorhynchids are usually around the same length, unlike in modern billfish, the genus Homorhynchus differs with the upper jaw being much longer than the lower jaw. When fully preserved, the jaw or jaws (depending on the species) take up about 60%-70% of the skull length. The jaws of the fish are usually straight though they curve inwards anteriorly in Pseudotetrapturus.

=== Postcranium ===
Unlike the skull, the slender and elongate postcrania of palaeorhynchids is overall very similar to modern billfish. The main difference between them and extant members is the single soft dorsal fin that runs from the skull to around the caudal fin of the fish. This fin, however, is split into two sections with the anterior having much longer fin rays that connect to a fan-shaped pterygiophore that has three ridges. This is in contrast to the much shorter fin rays on the posterior section that each are attached to wedge-shaped pterygiophores that are wider as one gets further from the vertebrae. Almost all of vertebrae, excluding ones that are the most anterior and posterior, possess neural and haemal spines that have a plate-shaped projection at the posterior edge. The anal fin of palaeorhynchids is similar in morphology to the anterior section of the dorsal fin though it is much shorter. The height of the anal and dorsal fins differ between genera with them being longer than the maximum body depth in Palaeorhynchus and much shorter in Homorhynchus.

== Evolutionary history ==
The earliest member of Palaeorhynchidae is Palaeorhynchus zorzini from the Ypresian of Italy, specifically from the famous localities within Monte Bolca. It is generally considered to be the basal most member of the genus, suggesting that the family originally diversified in warm, shallow water within the Tethys Sea. Along with Palaeorhynchus, a number of other genera such as Homorhynchus and Aglyptorhynchus, if a true member of the family, would also appear during the middle to late Eocene with all of these genera being specifically found in the western Paratethys. The family would not reach the eastern Paratethys until the Oligocene with earlier genera along with the genus Pseudotetrapturus being found in sediments in the Caucasus. All generally agreed upon members of the family would go extinct in the Oligocene with the youngest potential member of the family, Aglyptorhynchus, going extinct in the Miocene.
