= Enniskillenus =

Enniskillenus Temporal range: Early Eocene

Scientific classification
- Kingdom: Animalia
- Phylum: Chordata
- Class: Actinopterygii
- Division: Teleostei
- Order: Carangiformes
- Family: †Palaeorhynchidae
- Genus: †Enniskillenus; Casier, 1966
- Species: †E. radiatus

Binomial name
- †Enniskillenus radiatus Casier, 1966 ex Agassiz, 1833

Extinct genus of fishes

Enniskillenus is an extinct genus of prehistoric billfish from the Eocene of Europe. It contains a single species, E. radiatus from the Early Eocene-aged London Clay of England.

The species was first improperly named without a description (as Ptychocephalus radiatus) by Agassiz (1833), and later assigned as an indeterminate member of Palaeorhynchus by Woodward (1901). It was properly described by Casier in 1966, who placed it in the new genus Enniskillenus, named in honor of William Cole, 3rd Earl of Enniskillen, who collected fossil fish and donated specimens to the British Museum.

Although often placed in the primitive billfish family Palaeorhynchidae, most specimens of Enniskillenus do not preserve enough traits for a refined classification, though their vertebral morphology and rostra confirm that they are at least billfish.
