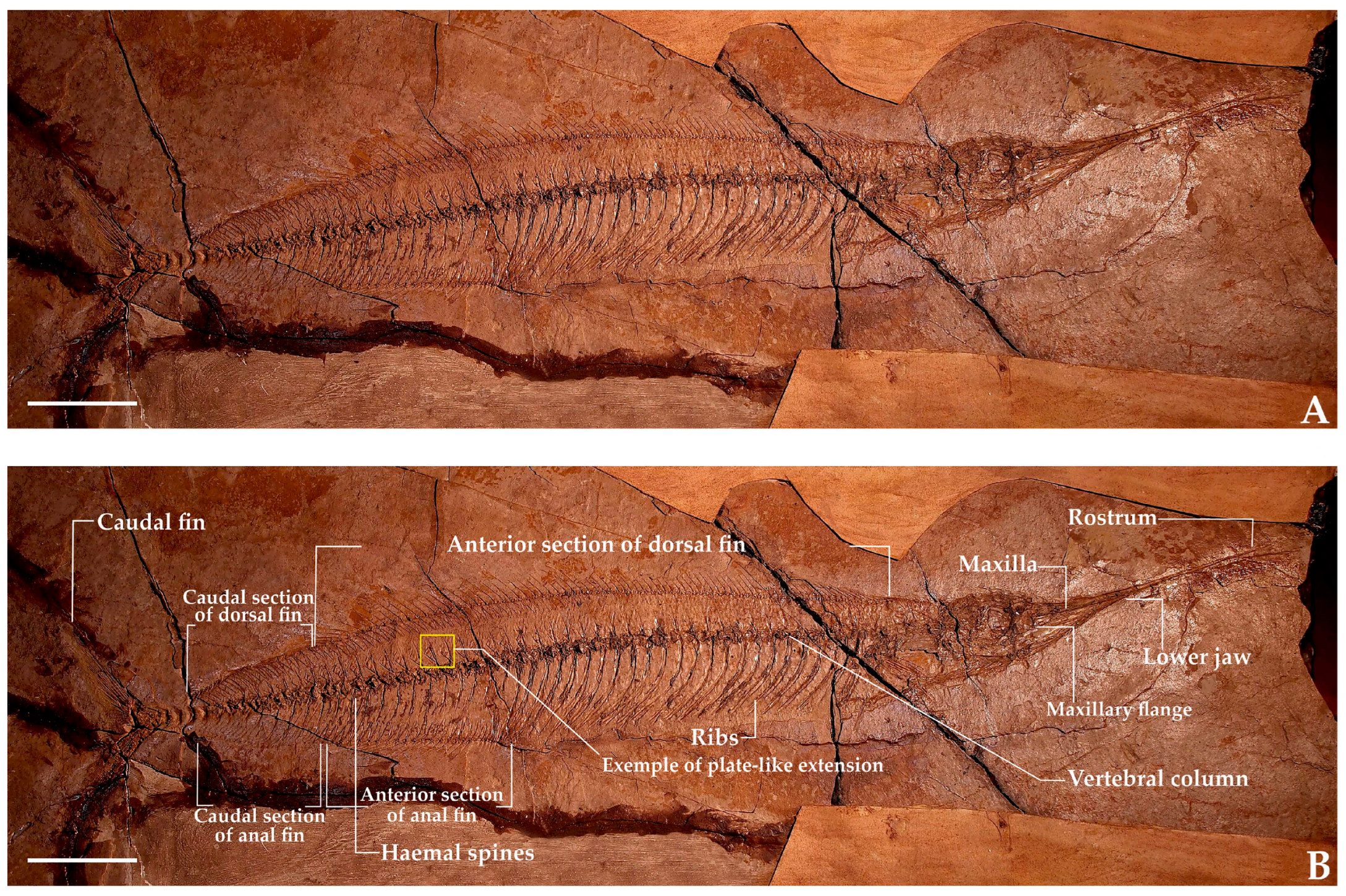
- Specimen of H. colei from Romania

Scientific classification
- Kingdom: Animalia
- Phylum: Chordata
- Class: Actinopterygii
- Division: Teleostei
- Order: Carangiformes
- Family: †Palaeorhynchidae
- Genus: †Homorhynchus van Beneden, 1873

Type species
- †Homorhynchus bruxelliensis van Beneden, 1873

Species
- H. bruxelliensis van Beneden, 1873; H. colei (Agassiz, 1844); H. deshayesi (Agassiz, 1844)

Synonyms
- Hemirhynchus Agassiz, 1844 (preocc.)

= Homorhynchus =

Homorhynchus Temporal range: Middle Eocene–Early Oligocene

Extinct genus of fishes

Homorhynchus (Greek for "same beak") is a genus of prehistoric billfish known from the Eocene to the Oligocene of Europe.

The following species are known:

- H. bruxelliensis van Beneden, 1873 (type species) - Middle Eocene of Belgium
- H. colei (Agassiz, 1844) - Early Oligocene of Switzerland (Matt Formation), North Caucasus of Russia (Pshekha Formation), Abkhazia, Romania (Lower Dysodilic Shales Formation)
- H. deshayesi (Agassiz, 1844) - Middle Eocene of France (Lutetian limestone)

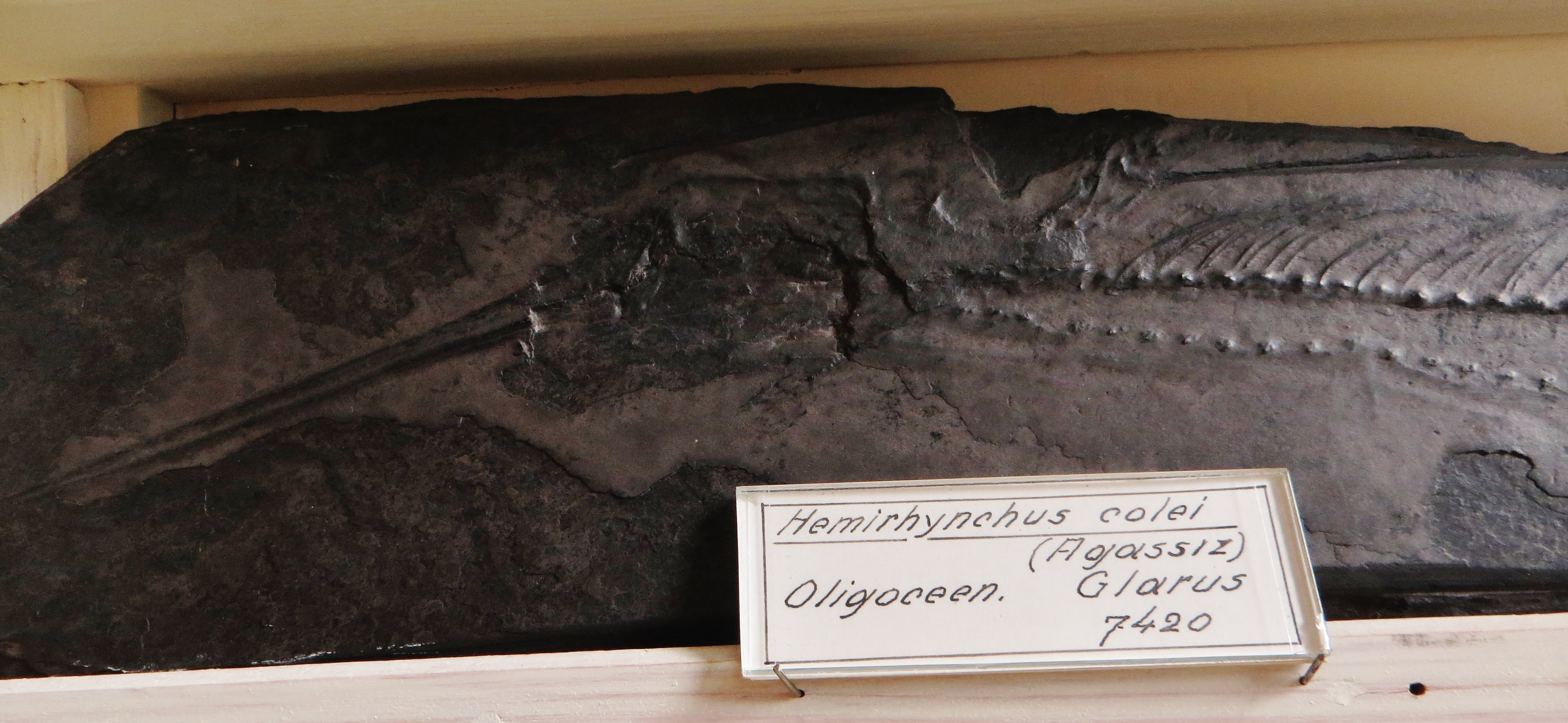
Specimen of H. colei from Switzerland, Teylers Museum

Due to being less well-studied compared to H. colei and being contemporaneous, it is possible that H. bruxelliensis and H. deshayesi are synonymous with each other. H. colei and H. deshayesi were originally placed in Hemirhynchus Agassiz, 1844, which was found to be preoccupied by a junior synonym for the bird genus Suthora (Hemirhynchus Hodgson, 1843). Both these species were thus reclassified into the genus Homorhynchus, originally coined as a monotypic genus by Pierre-Joseph van Beneden for H. bruxelliensis.

Unlike most other early billfish, which had equally long upper and lower jaws, Homorhynchus had an elongated upper jaw and a significantly reduced lower jaw, the same as is seen in modern billfishes. Otherwise, it closely resembles the closely related, contemporaneous billfish Palaeorhynchus.
