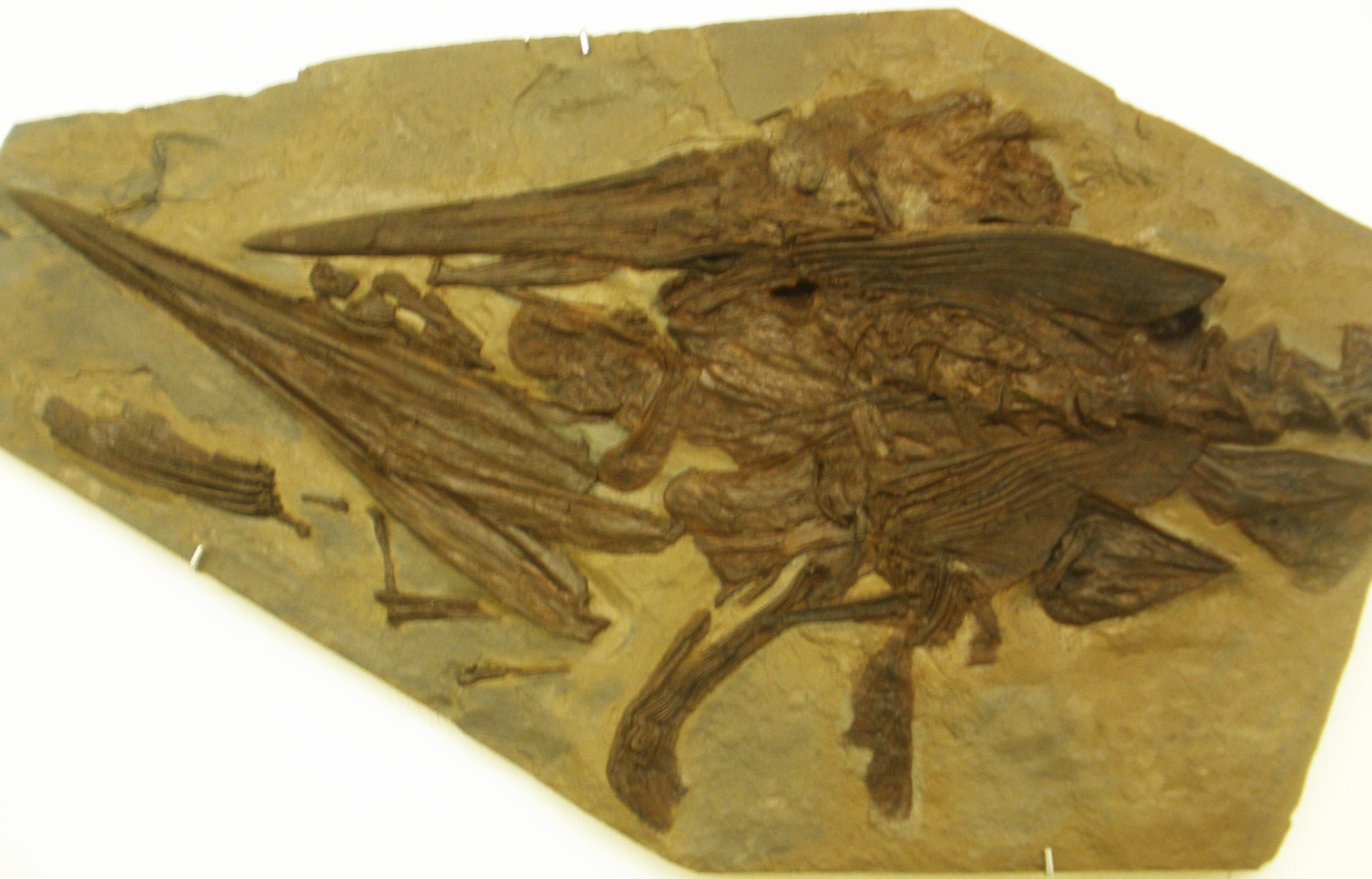
- Fossil of Xiphiorhynchus

Scientific classification
- Kingdom: Animalia
- Phylum: Chordata
- Class: Actinopterygii
- Order: Carangiformes
- Superfamily: Xiphioidea
- Family: †Xiphiorhynchidae; Regan, 1909

Genera
- See text

= Xiphiorhynchidae =

Xiphiorhynchidae Temporal range: Early Eocene–Early Miocene

The Xiphiorhynchidae are an extinct family of early billfish known from the Early Eocene to the Early Miocene. They had a global range, being found off the coasts of North America, Europe, Oceania, and even Antarctica.

The family was originally coined in 1909, containing just the genus Xiphiorhynchus. It continued to be recognized throughout the 20th century. Several authors noticed close morphological similarities between Xiphiorhynchus and the modern Istiophoridae, and suggested the two families may represent sister groups to one another. In 2002, based on apparent similarities to swordfish, Xiphiorhynchidae was subsumed into the swordfish family Xiphiidae as the subfamily Xiphiorhynchinae. The family was revived in a 2025 study, which reaffirmed the past interpretation of the Xiphiorhynchidae as related to the Istiophoridae, rather than to the Xiphiidae. The genus Aglyptorhynchus, previously placed in the Palaeorhynchidae, was also found to be a xiphiorhynchid.

The Xiphiorhynchidae could grow to large sizes, in contrast to other early billfish families. A fossil vertebra of Xiphiorhynchus from the Early Eocene of Antarctica appears to have come from an individual 350 centimetres (11.5 ft) in length, making it one of the largest known Cenozoic fossil fish. Unlike modern billfish, their lower jaws were rather long, reaching similar lengths to the elongated rostrum of the upper jaw.

The following genera are placed in this family:

- Aglyptorhynchus Casier, 1966 (=?Pseudotetrapturus Daniltshenko, 1960)
- Xiphiorhynchus van Beneden, 1871
- Xiphiorhynchoides Fierstine & Pfeil, 2009
- Zealandorhynchus Rust, Wium, Otero & Terezow, 2026
