= Xiphiorhynchoides =

Xiphiorhynchoides Temporal range: Early Oligocene

Scientific classification
- Kingdom: Animalia
- Phylum: Chordata
- Class: Actinopterygii
- Order: Carangiformes
- Family: †Xiphiorhynchidae
- Genus: †Xiphiorhynchoides; Fierstine & Pfeil, 2009

Type species
- †Xiphiorhynchoides haeringensis Fierstine & Pfeil, 2009

Extinct genus of fishes

Xiphiorhynchoides is an extinct genus of swordfish from the Oligocene of Austria. Its fossils have been found in the Paisslberg Formation in Tyrol, which is thought to represent a deepwater environment close to the shore. It is the best preserved member of the Xiphiorhynchinae and known from a single species: X. haeringensis. The name derives from the town of Bad Häring.

== Description ==
Xiphiorhynchoides is known from its skull and the front areas of the body. It resembles Xiphiorhynchus in several anatomical details such as the paired premaxillae that fuse towards the end of the rostrum and the presence of fine and elongated (villiform) teeth. Like its relative, both the upper jaw and lower jaw were elongated and equal in length, which differentiates them from modern swordfish. However it can be distinguished from Xiphiorhynchus by the fused mandibular symphysis of the lower jaw, a large hyoid and the complete suspensorium. Additionally, it appears to entirely lack the nasal bones and possesses an elongated ethmoid bone. The holotype preserves the dorso-ventrally aligned pectoral girdle and its fins along with the dorsal fin and anal fins.
