= Zealandorhynchus =

Zealandorhynchus Temporal range: Ypresian, ~56–52 Ma

Scientific classification
- Kingdom: Animalia
- Phylum: Chordata
- Class: Actinopterygii
- Division: Teleostei
- Order: Carangiformes
- Family: †Xiphiorhynchidae
- Genus: †Zealandorhynchus; Rust et al., 2026
- Species: †Z. fordycei

Binomial name
- †Zealandorhynchus fordycei Rust et al., 2026

Extinct genus of billfish

Zealandorhynchus is an extinct genus of billfish that lived around New Zealand during the early Eocene epoch. The only species found to be in this genus is Zealandorhynchus fordycei.

It was named in honor of Professor Ewan Fordyce, a vertebrate paleontologist in New Zealand who had a 40-year long career in the University of Otago.

== Phylogeny ==
Phylogenetic analysis of Z. fordycei has placed this species as a basal member of Xiphioidei and part of the extinct family Xiphiorhynchidae.

== Discovery ==
The specimens for this species were collected in the Kurinui Formation from Hampden Beach, North Otago region, South Island of New Zealand. From here, two large crania, with the first discovered in 1984, and the second discovered in two sections on 3 October 2020 and 10 November 2022 by Morne Mamlambo, belonging to billfishes were uncovered with the most complete material being referred to as Zealandorhynchus with the lesser complete material referred to as an unknown species of undetermined placement (incertae sedis). They are currently housed inside the Earth Science New Zealand National Paleontological Collection.

The discovery of Zealandorhynchus along with another incertae sedis Xiphioidei represents notable additions to the fossil record of fish species in New Zealand during the Eocene epoch. They also show that Xiphiorhynchidae reached a high level of diversity and widespread Southern Ocean distribution at the time. This means that even before the Oligocene epoch, early species of billfishes already had a cosmopolitan distribution.
