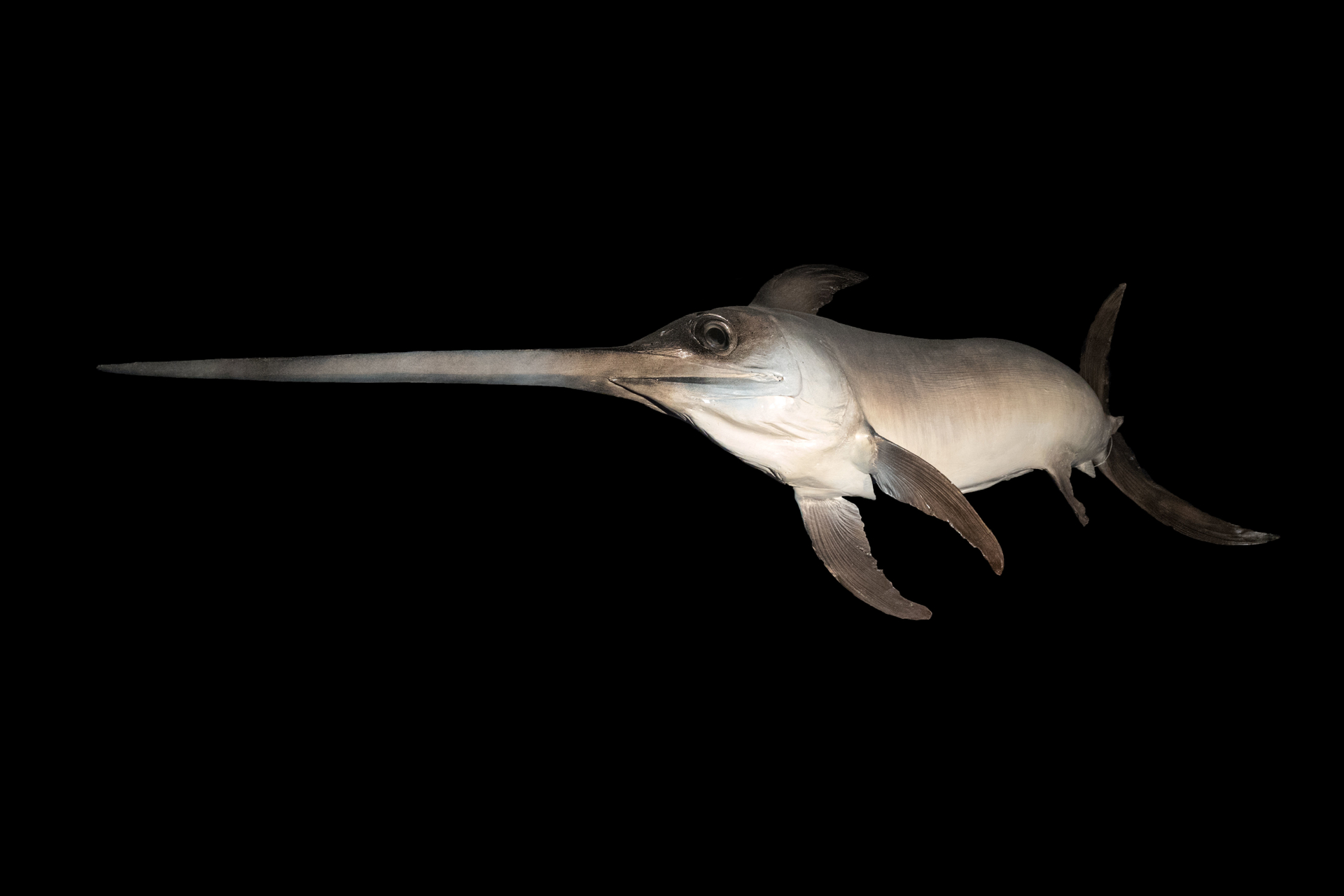

Conservation status
- Near Threatened (IUCN 3.1)

Scientific classification
- Kingdom: Animalia
- Phylum: Chordata
- Class: Actinopterygii
- Division: Teleostei
- Order: Carangiformes
- Suborder: Menoidei
- Superfamily: Xiphioidea
- Family: Xiphiidae; Rafinesque, 1815
- Genus: Xiphias; Linnaeus, 1758
- Species: X. gladius

Binomial name
- Xiphias gladius Linnaeus, 1758
- Global distribution of swordfish in blue

Synonyms
- Xiphias imperator Bloch & Schneider, 1801; Tetrapterus imperator (Bloch & Schneider, 1801); Xiphias rondeletii Leach, 1814; Phaethonichthys tuberculatus Nichols, 1923; Xiphias estara Phillipps, 1932; Xiphias thermaicus Serbetis, 1951

= Swordfish =

Swordfish Temporal range: Middle Miocene–present

Fish which has a long, pointed bill

The swordfish (Xiphias gladius), also known as the broadbill in some countries, are large, highly migratory predatory fish characterized by a long, flat, sword-like, pointed bill. They are the sole member of the family Xiphiidae. They are a popular sport fish of the billfish category. Swordfish are elongated, round-bodied, and lose all teeth and scales by adulthood. These fish are found widely in tropical and temperate parts of the Atlantic, Pacific, and Indian Oceans, and can typically be found from near the surface to a depth of 550 m (1,800 ft), and exceptionally up to depths of 2,878 m (9,442 ft). They commonly reach 3 m (10 ft) in length, and the maximum reported is 4.55 m (14 ft 11 in) in length and 650 kg (1,430 lb) in weight.

== Taxonomy and etymology ==
The swordfish is named after its long, pointed, flat bill, which resembles a sword. The species name, Xiphias gladius, derives from Greek ξιφίας (xiphias, "swordfish"), itself from ξίφος (xiphos, "sword") and from Latin gladius ("sword"). This makes it superficially similar to other billfish such as marlin, but upon examination, their physiology is quite different and they are members of different families.

The swordfish appears to have a deep evolutionary divergence from all other billfish, dating to at least the middle Paleocene. In the past, several fossil billfish genera, such as the giant Xiphiorhynchus, were attributed to the family Xiphiidae. However, Rust et al (2025) found many of these genera to form their own clade, Xiphiorhynchidae, that likely forms the sister group to the marlins and sailfish in the family Istiophoridae. In contrast, the small-sized Blochiidae from the Early Eocene were found to be the sister group to the swordfish. The earliest known fossil remains of true swordfish date to the Middle Miocene, where the articulated partial posterior skeleton of a juvenile Xiphias has been recorded from Paratethyan deposits in Poland. However, even this record is uncertain. Outside of this one record, all other fossil records of swordfish are known only from the Pliocene of Italy (where a nearly complete fossil skeleton is known) and North Carolina, US.

== Description ==
They commonly reach 3 m (10 ft) in length, and the maximum reported is 4.55 m (14 ft 11 in) in length and 682 kg (1,500 lb) in weight. The International Game Fish Association's all-tackle angling record for a swordfish was a 536 kg (1,182 lb) specimen taken off Chile in 1953. Females are larger than males, and Pacific swordfish reach a greater size than northwest Atlantic and Mediterranean swordfish.

They reach maturity at 4–5 years of age, and the maximum age is believed to be at least 9 years. The oldest swordfish found in a recent study were a 16-year-old female and 12-year-old male. Swordfish ages are derived, with difficulty, from annual rings on fin rays rather than otoliths, since their otoliths are small in size.

=== Temperature regulation ===
Swordfish are ectothermic animals. Along with some species of sharks, they have special organs next to their eyes called heater cells which function to heat their eyes and brains. Their eyes are heated to temperatures measured between 10 and 15 °C above the surrounding water temperature; this heating greatly improves their vision and, consequently, their predatory efficacy.

The swordfish is one of 22 species of fish – including the marlin, tuna, and some sharks – known to have a heat-conservation mechanism.

== Behavior and ecology ==
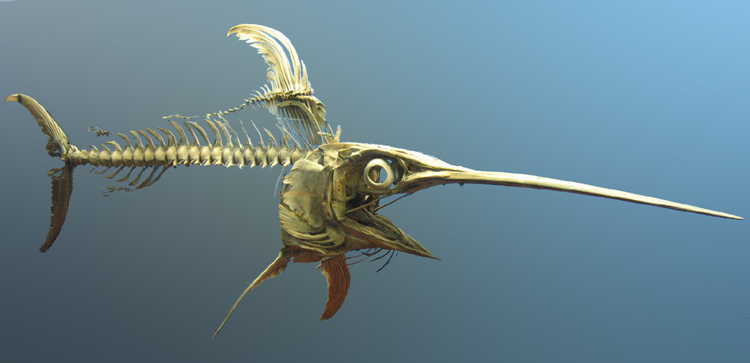
Swordfish skeleton at the National Museum of Natural History, Washington, DC

=== Movements and feeding ===
The popular image of the swordfish skewering its prey with its nose is based on little evidence. In a typical environment, swordfish most likely use their noses to slash at prey and inflict weakening injuries. The hypothesis that they may use their noses as spears in a defensive capacity against sharks and other predators is still under review.

Mainly, the swordfish relies on its great speed and agility in the water to catch its prey. It is no doubt among the fastest fish, but the basis for the frequently-quoted speed of 100 km/h (60 mph) is unreliable. Research on related marlin (Istiophorus platypterus) suggest a maximum value of 36 km/h (22 mph) is more likely.

Swordfish are not schooling fish. They swim alone or in very loose aggregations, separated by as much as 10 m (35 ft) from a neighboring swordfish. They are frequently found basking at the surface, airing their first dorsal fin. Boaters report this to be a beautiful sight, as well as the powerful jumping for which the species is known. This jumping, also called breaching, may be an effort to dislodge pests, such as remoras or lampreys.

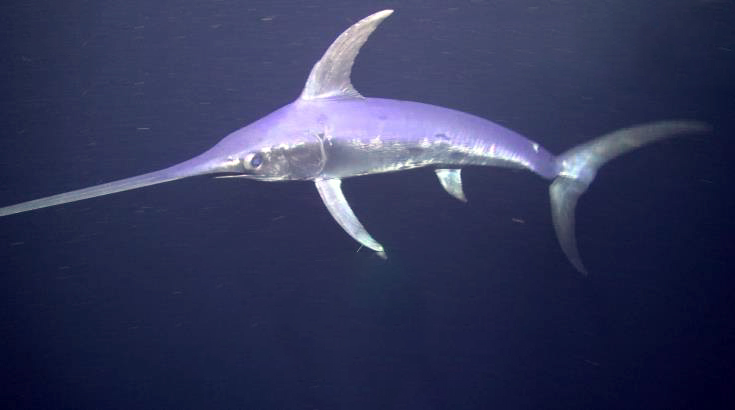
A deep-diving swordfish, photographed in the eastern Gulf of Mexico at 701 meters below the surface.

Swordfish prefer water temperatures between 18 and 22 °C (64 and 72 °F), but have the widest tolerance among billfish, and can be found from 5 to 27 °C (41 to 81 °F). This highly migratory species typically moves towards colder regions to feed during the summer. Swordfish feed daily, most often at night, when they rise to surface and near-surface waters in search of smaller fish. During the day, they commonly occur to depths of 550 m (1,800 ft; 300 fathoms) and have exceptionally been recorded as deep as 2,878 m (9,442 ft; 1,574 fathoms). Adults feed on a wide range of pelagic fish, such as mackerel, barracudinas, silver hake, rockfish, herring, and lanternfishes. They also take demersal fish, squid, and crustaceans. In the northwestern Atlantic, a survey based on the stomach content of 168 individuals found 82% had eaten squid and 53% had eaten fish, including gadids, scombrids, butterfish, bluefish, and sand lance. Large prey are typically slashed with the sword, while small ones are swallowed whole.

=== Threats and parasites ===
Almost 50 species of parasites have been documented in swordfish. In addition to remoras, lampreys, and cookiecutter sharks, this includes a wide range of invertebrates, such as tapeworms, roundworms, Myxozoans and copepods. A comparison of the parasites of swordfish in the Atlantic and in the Mediterranean indicated that some parasites, particularly Anisakis spp. larvae identified by genetic markers, could be used as biological tags and support the existence of a Mediterranean swordfish stock.

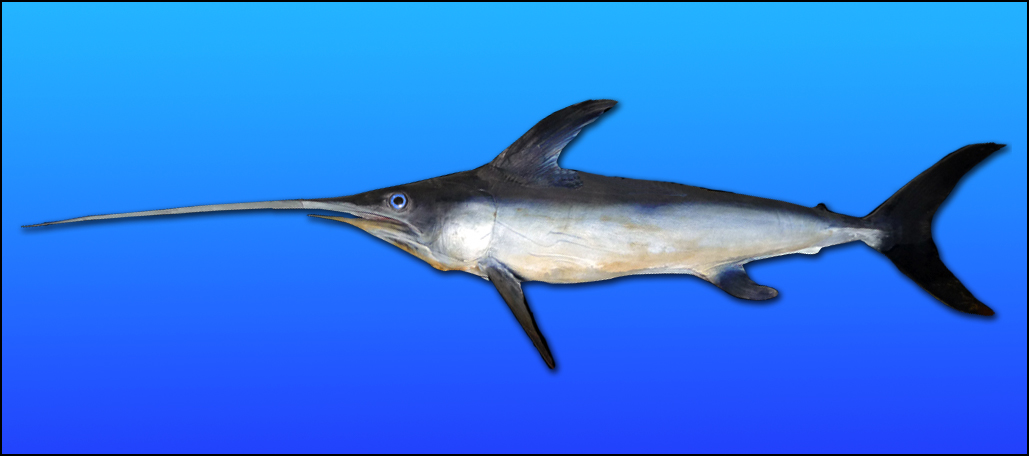
Stuffed broadbill swordfish

Fully adult swordfish have few natural predators. Among marine mammals, killer whales sometimes prey on adult swordfish. It is believed that sperm whales may also prey on swordfish on rare occasions. The shortfin mako, an exceptionally fast species of shark, sometimes takes on swordfish; dead or dying shortfin makos have been found with broken-off swords in their heads, revealing the danger of this type of prey. Juvenile swordfish are far more vulnerable to predation, and are eaten by a wide range of predatory fish. Intensive fishery may be driving swordfishes and sharks into harder competition for reduced amounts of prey and therefore pitting them to fight more.

Human fishery is a major predator of swordfish. The annual reported catch in 2019 of the North Atlantic swordfish amounted to a total of 1.3 million kilograms (2.9 million pounds).

=== Breeding ===
In the North Pacific, batch spawning mainly occurs in water warmer than 24 °C (75 °F) during the spring and summer, and year-round in the equatorial Pacific. In the North Atlantic, spawning is known from the Sargasso Sea, and in water warmer than 23 °C (73 °F) and less than 75 m (246 ft; 41 fathoms) deep. Spawning occurs from November to February in the South Atlantic off southern Brazil. Spawning is year-round in the Caribbean Sea and other warm regions of the west Atlantic.

Large females can carry more eggs than small females, and between 1 million and 29 million eggs have been recorded. The pelagic eggs measure 1.6–1.8 mm (1/16–5/64 in) in diameter and 2 1/2 days after fertilization, the embryonic development occurs. The surface-living and unique-looking larvae are 4 mm (5/32 in) long at hatching. The bill is evident when the larvae reach 1 cm (3/8 in) in length.

== Fisheries ==
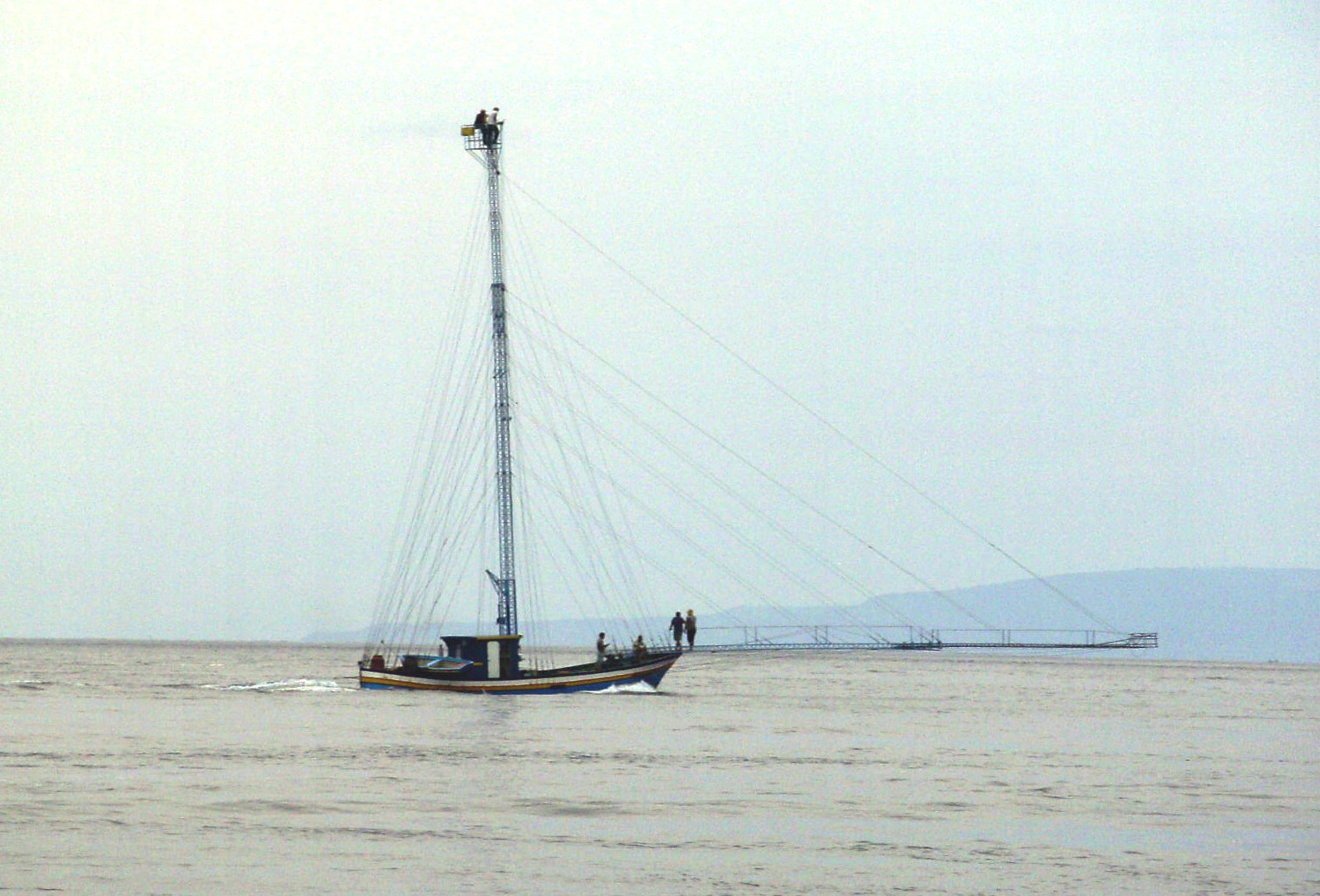
Felucca used in the Strait of Messina to hunt swordfish

Global capture production of Swordfish (Xiphias gladius) in thousand tonnes from 1950 to 2022, as reported by the FAO

Swordfish were harvested by a variety of methods at a small scale (notably harpoon fishing) until the global expansion of long-line fishing. They have been fished widely since ancient times in places such as the Strait of Messina, where they are still fished with traditional wooden boats called feluccas and are part of the cuisine in that area.

Swordfish are vigorous, powerful fighters. Although no unprovoked attacks on humans have been reported, swordfish can be very dangerous when harpooned. They have run their swords through the planking of small boats when hurt. Museums hold a number of hull fragments from large sailing ships with embedded swordfish rostra, in some cases piercing multiple layers of heavy wood and even copper cladding. In 2015, a Hawaiian fisherman was killed by a swordfish after attempting to spear the animal.

== Recreational fishing ==
Recreational fishing has developed a subspecialty called swordfishing. Because of a ban on long-lining along many parts of the seashore, swordfish populations are showing signs of recovery from the overfishing caused by long-lining along the coast.

Various ways are used to fish for swordfish, but the most common method is deep-drop fishing, since swordfish spend most daylight hours very deep, in the deep scattering layer. The boat is allowed to drift to present a more natural bait. Swordfishing requires strong fishing rods and reels, as swordfish can become quite large, and it is not uncommon to use 2.5 kg (5 lb) or more of weight to get the baits deep enough during the day, up to 460 m (1,500 ft) is common. Night fishing baits are usually fished much shallower, often less than 90 m (300 ft; 50 fathoms). Standard baits are whole mackerel, herring, mullet, bonito, or squid; one can also use live bait. Imitation squids and other imitation fish lures can also be used, and specialized lures made specifically for swordfishing often have battery-powered or glow lights. Even baits are typically presented using glow sticks or specialized deepwater-proof battery-operated lights.

== As food ==
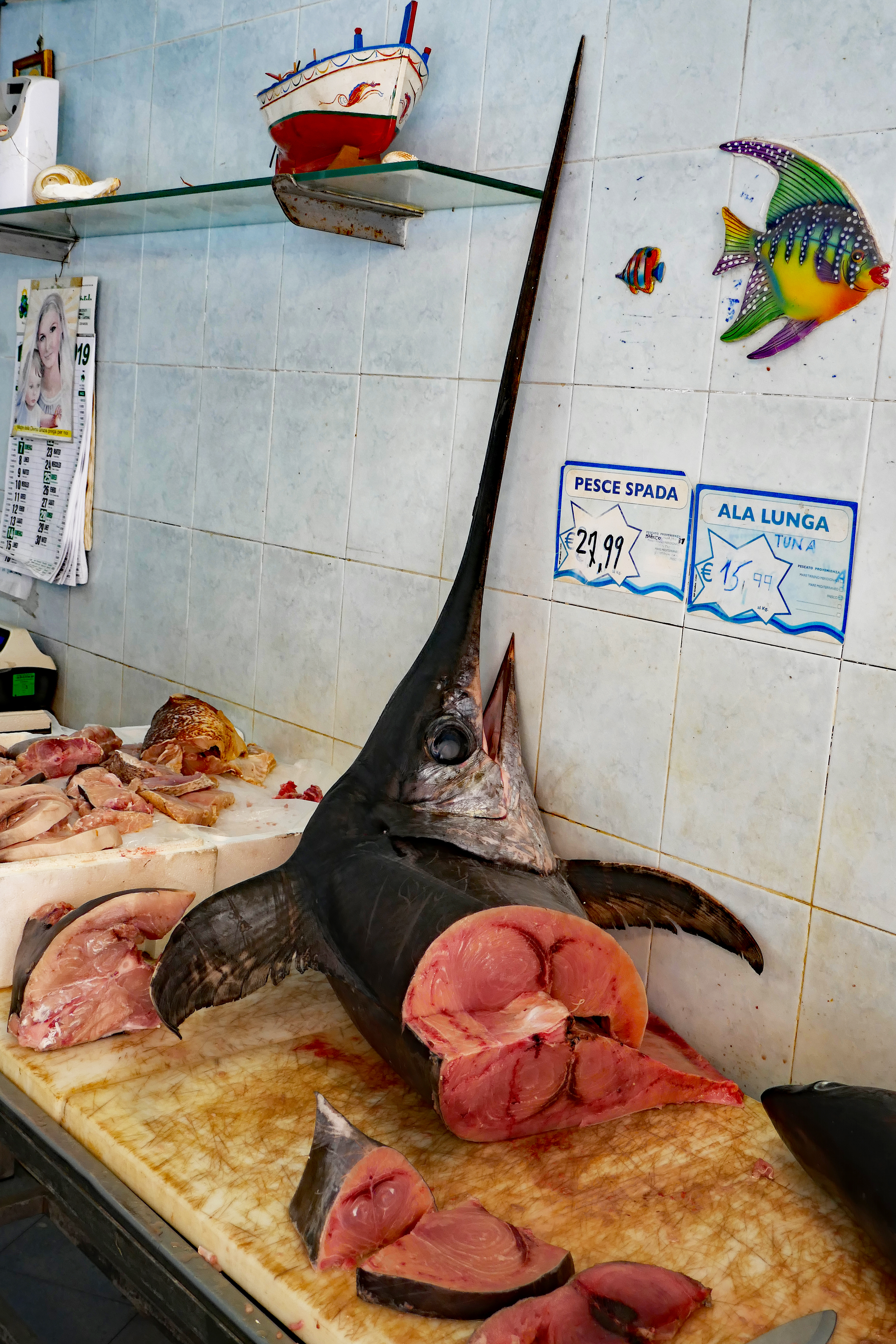
Swordfish in seafood shop

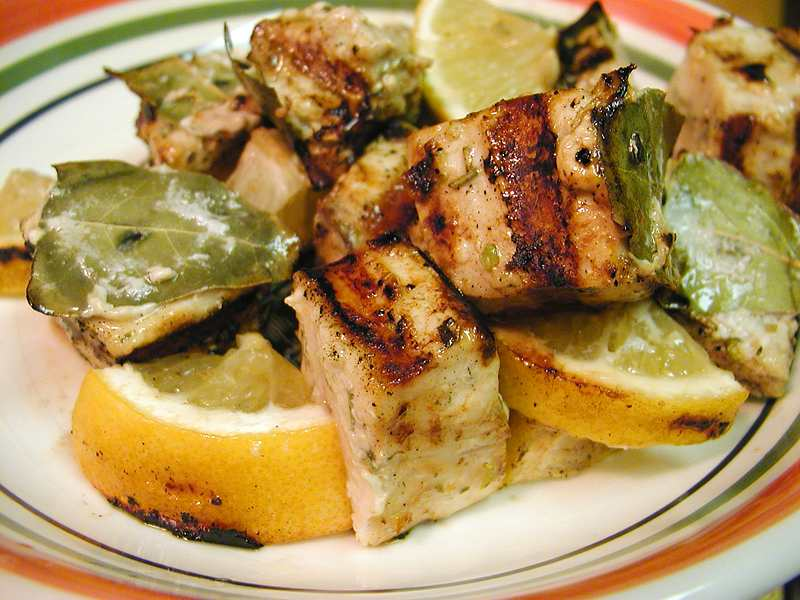
Marinated swordfish

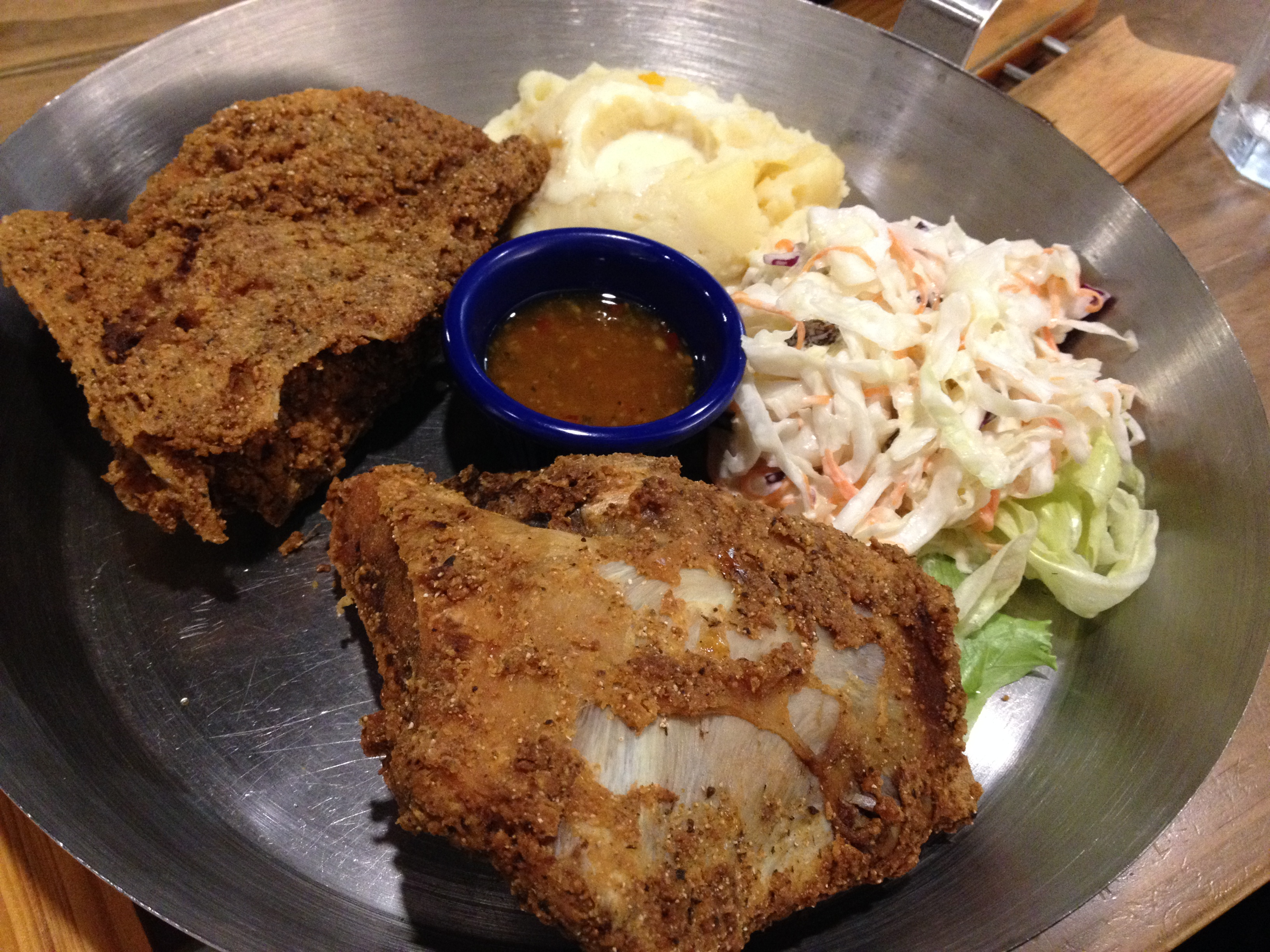
Fried swordfish collars

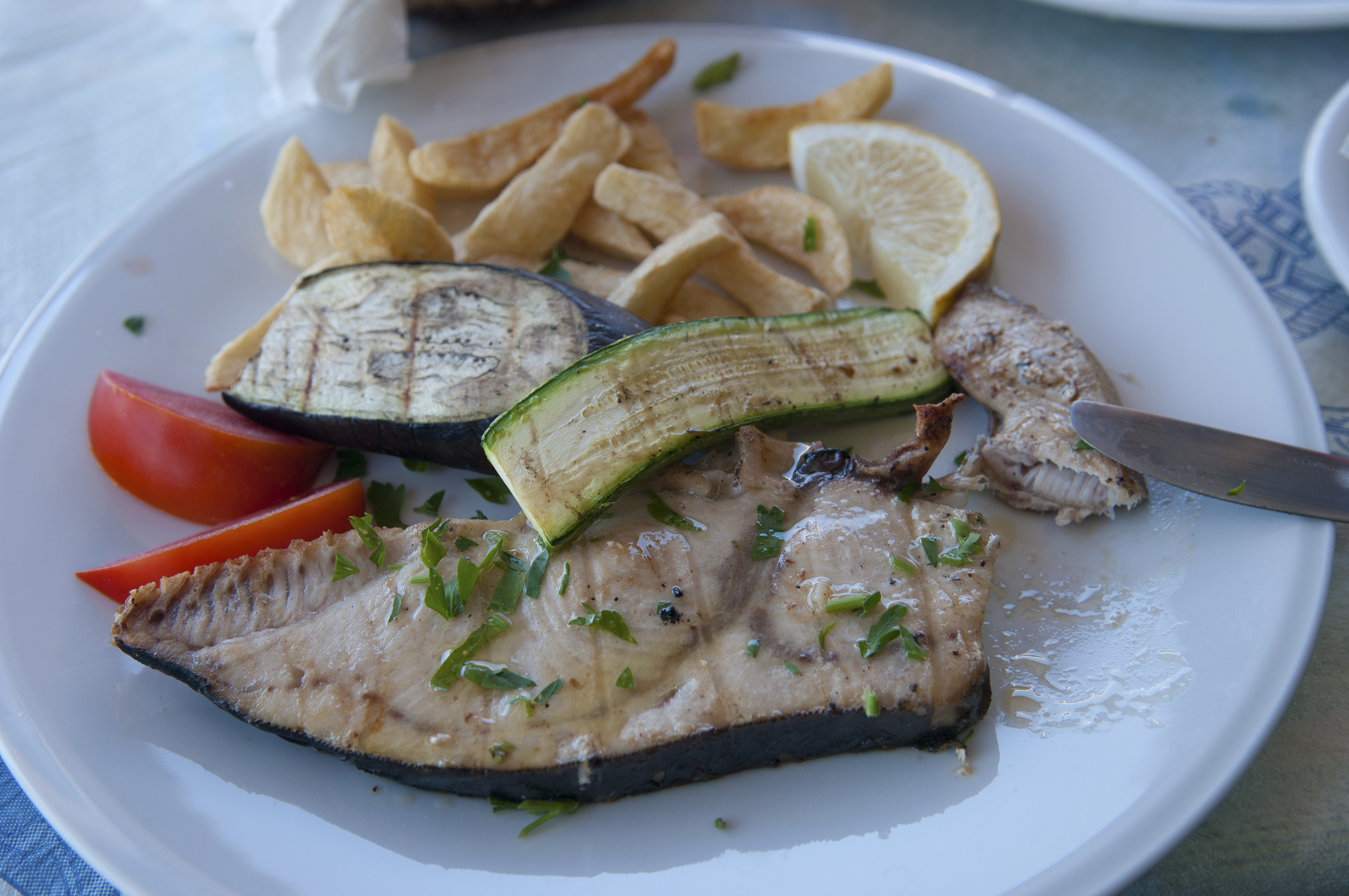
Swordfish dish in Kos

Swordfish are classified as oily fish. Many sources, including the United States Food and Drug Administration, warn about potential toxicity from high levels of methylmercury in swordfish. The FDA recommends that young children, pregnant women, and women planning to become pregnant not eat swordfish.

The flesh of some swordfish can acquire an orange tint, reportedly from their diet of shrimp or other prey. Such fish are sold as "pumpkin swordfish" and command a premium over their whitish counterparts.

Swordfish is a particularly popular fish for cooking. Since swordfish are large, the meat is usually sold as steaks, which are often grilled. Swordfish meat is relatively firm and can be cooked in ways that more fragile types of fish cannot (such as over a grill on skewers). The color of the flesh varies by diet, with fish caught on the East Coast of North America often being rosier.

=== Kashrut ===
A dispute exists as to whether swordfish should be considered a kosher fish according to the laws of kashrut. Standard Orthodox opinion is that swordfish is not kosher, while Conservative Judaism does consider swordfish kosher. All kosher fish must have both fins and scales. The Talmud and the Tosefta are believed by some to present swordfish ("achsaftias") as an example of a kosher fish without scales because swordfish are born with scales, they later shed once attaining a length of about 1 meter. The 17th-century Turkish Sephardi halakhic authority Rabbi Chaim ben Yisrael Benvenisti wrote that "It is a widespread custom among all Jews to eat the fish with the sword, known in vernacular as fishei espada, even though it does not have any scales. Because it is said that when it comes out of the water, due to its anger, it shakes and throws off its scales." A 1933 list of kosher fish published by the Agudas HaRabbonim includes swordfish. The following year, Rabbi Yosef Kanowitz published the same list of kosher fish with swordfish still included. Swordfish was widely considered kosher by halakhic authorities until the 1950s. Orthodox opinion began to shift in 1951, when Rabbi Moshe Tendler examined swordfish and decided it was not kosher due to the lack of scales. Tendler's opinion provoked strong debate among halakhic authorities during the 1960s. Among Mediterranean Jews there was a longstanding minhag of considering swordfish kosher. Swordfish was and possibly still is consumed by Jews in Italy, Turkey, Gibraltar, Morocco, Tunisia, and England. Due to Tendler's opinion, swordfish are generally not considered kosher by Orthodox Jews in the United States and Israel.

== Conservation status ==
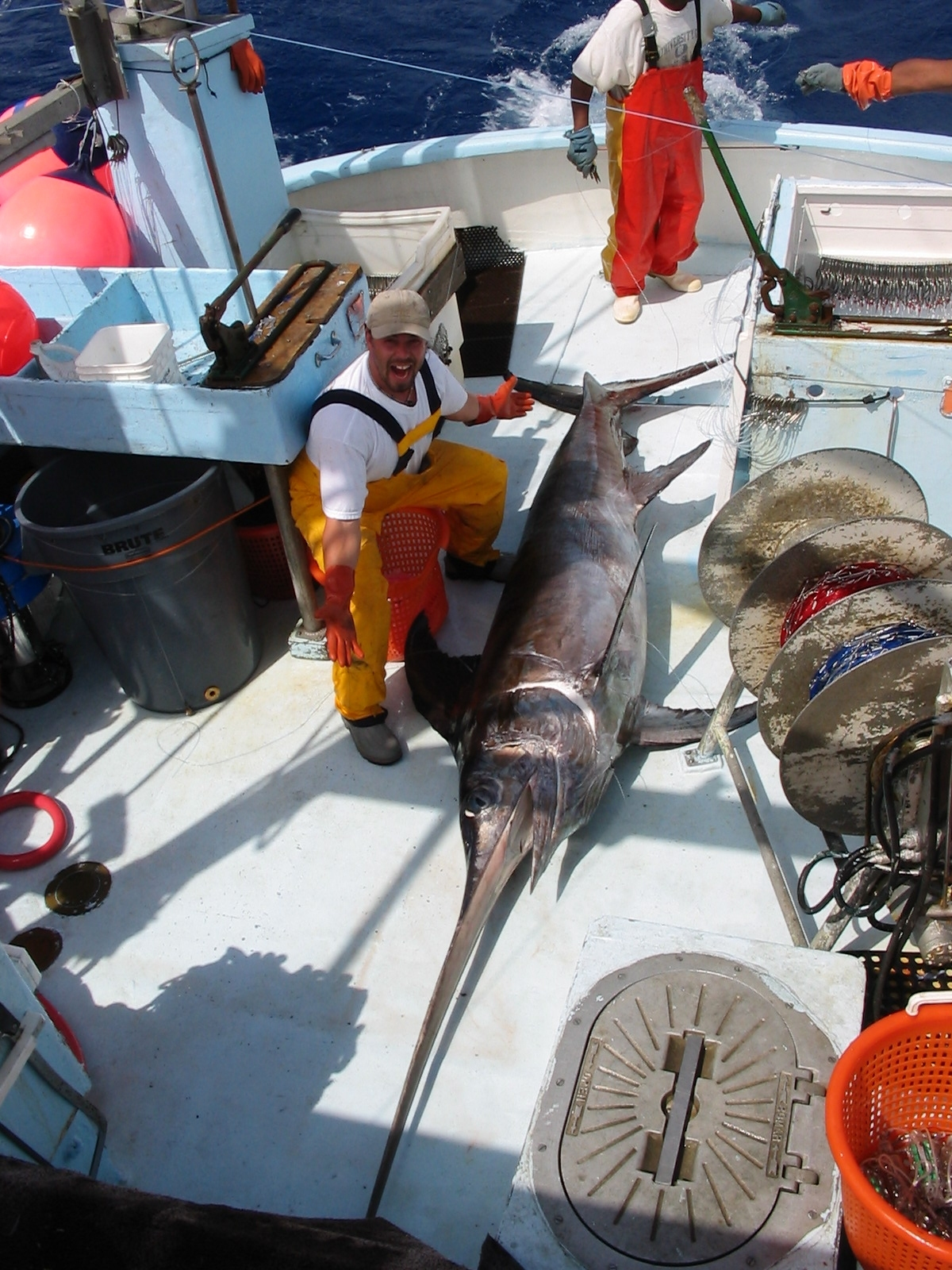
Swordfish on deck during long-lining operations

In 1998, the U.S. Natural Resources Defense Council and SeaWeb hired Fenton Communications to conduct an advertising campaign to promote their assertion that the swordfish population was in danger due to its popularity as a restaurant entree.

The resulting "Give Swordfish a Break" promotion was wildly successful, with 750 prominent U.S. chefs agreeing to remove North Atlantic swordfish from their menus, and also persuaded many supermarkets and consumers across the country.

The advertising campaign was repeated by the national media in hundreds of print and broadcast stories, as well as extensive regional coverage. It earned the Silver Anvil award from the Public Relations Society of America, as well as Time magazine's award for the top five environmental stories of 1998.

Subsequently, the U.S. National Marine Fisheries Service proposed a swordfish protection plan that incorporated the campaign's policy suggestions. Then-US President Bill Clinton called for a ban on the sale and import of swordfish, and in a landmark decision by the federal government, 343,600 km^{2} (132,670 sq mi) of the Atlantic Ocean were placed off-limits to fishing as recommended by the sponsors.

In the North Atlantic, the swordfish stock is fully rebuilt, with biomass estimates currently 5% above the target level. No robust stock assessments for swordfish in the northwestern Pacific or South Atlantic have been made, and data concerning stock status in these regions are lacking. These stocks are considered unknown and a moderate conservation concern. The southwestern Pacific stock is a moderate concern due to model uncertainty, increasing catches, and declining catch per unit effort. Overfishing is likely occurring in the Indian Ocean, and fishing mortality exceeds the maximum recommended level in the Mediterranean, thus these stocks are considered of high conservation concern.

In 2010, Greenpeace International added the swordfish to its seafood red list.

=== Extinct ===
- Xiphiorhynchoides

== Relationship with humans ==
=== Notable incidents ===
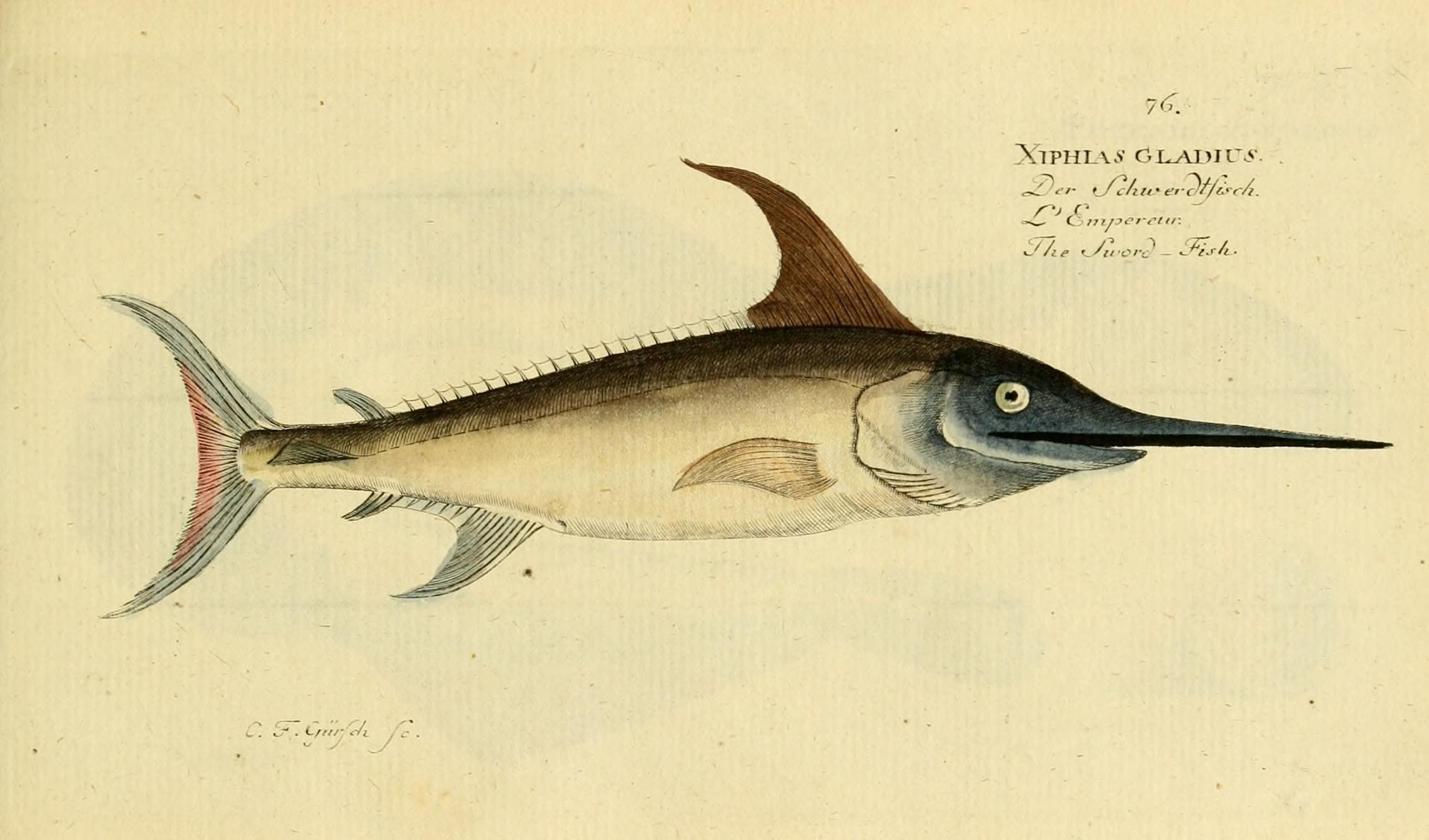
Swordfish in an illustration from 1796

In 2007, a fisherman died after trying to catch a swordfish, which pierced his eye, and its bill penetrated the man's skull.

In 2024, Giulia Manfrini, an Italian surfer, died in a rare incident after being struck by a swordfish while surfing off the coast of West Sumatra, Indonesia.

=== In culture ===
The swordfish (Xiphias) has been used by astronomers as another name for the constellation of Dorado.

"Swordfish" is used as a password in the 1932 Marx Brothers film Horse Feathers. It has since appeared as a password in many films, television series, books, and video games.
