= Pseudotetrapturus =

Pseudotetrapturus Temporal range: Chattian

Scientific classification
- Kingdom: Animalia
- Phylum: Chordata
- Class: Actinopterygii
- Order: Carangiformes
- Suborder: Menoidei
- Superfamily: Xiphioidea
- Family: †Palaeorhynchidae
- Genus: †Pseudotetrapturus; Danilʹchenko, 1960

Species
- †P. luteus Danilʹchenko, 1960

Extinct genus of fishes

Pseudotetrapturus is an extinct genus of early billfish from the Oligocene of the Caucasus. The fish is much larger than other members of the family, having a body length estimated to be 4.0 metres (13.1 ft) and a body shape more similar to that of marlins than of other members of its family. Unlike modern genera, these fish would have had jaws of similar lengths with small teeth along with large scales when an adult. Pseudotetrapturus, along with the other organisms found at the sites, would have been endemic to a marginal sea associated with the Paratethys. There is only one species currently recognized being P. luteus.

== History ==
Pseudotetrapturus was originally described by P. G. Danilʹchenko in 1960 based on two specimens being the holotype (PIN 1413/50) which is represented by a crushed skull along with an incomplete postcranium found near the Sulak River and another specimen (PIN 484/1413) is just represented by a skull found near the Gumista River. Though the holotype was decently complete, the holotype was damaged by robbers that went through the site at some point before or during the year 1979.

== Description ==
Similar to other billfish, the skull of Pseudotetrapturus is largely made up of the rostrum with it making up 60-70% of the skull length. However unlike modern members, the upper and lower jaws were equal in length though the lower jaw would have been a bit deeper at the base; the base of the lower jaw would have made up 45% of the head height while the upper jaw would have only made up 30% of the total height of the skull. Both of the jaws were compressed lateral though did have a round cross section at the distal end. The end of each jaw curved slightly inwards in which they would have met one another. Small teeth were present on both the upper and lower jaws. The eyes of Pseudotetrapturus were located towards the back of the skull, being situated at a point where the preorbital section made up twice the length of the postorbital section. Both the preopercular and opercular are known from specimens with the operculum being very circular in having about equal width and height. In contrast to this, the preoperculum is crescent-shaped, being bent forwards, with groovers being found at the back of the bone. This large head would have made up 25-30% of the total body length. Pseudotetrapturus was a very large palaeorhynchid, having a body length estimated to be 4.0 metres (13.1 ft) with the body shape of the fish being more comparable to that of Tetrapturus than other members of the family. In comparison to these marlins, Pseudotetrapturus had a much higher vertebral count, with specimens suggesting a total count of 40-50 vertebrae. These vertebrae were long had long, thin ribs attached to them which would have bent backwards, allowing to reach the bottom edge of the body. Along with the difference in vertebral count, the pectoral fins of Pseudotetrapturus were placed further back than in marlins along with them being placed high up of the body, only slightly lower than the vertebral column. Similar to other palaeorhynchids, the dorsal fin of the fish was very tall with it being around the length of 8-10 vertebrae. Scales of the fish have been found with them being large and cycloid in shape, where they would have covered the entire trunk along with the gill cover and occiput.

== Paleoenvironment ==
The holotype of Pseudotetrapturus was originally found in the upper Maikop Series, specifically the Riki Horizon, which represents an isolated marginal sea which was a part of the Paratethys. Based on a number of features of the geology of the area, these waters would have been highly productive. This productivity would later result in the anoxic sea floors and the build up of hydrogen sulfide that at one point would have entered the water column.
