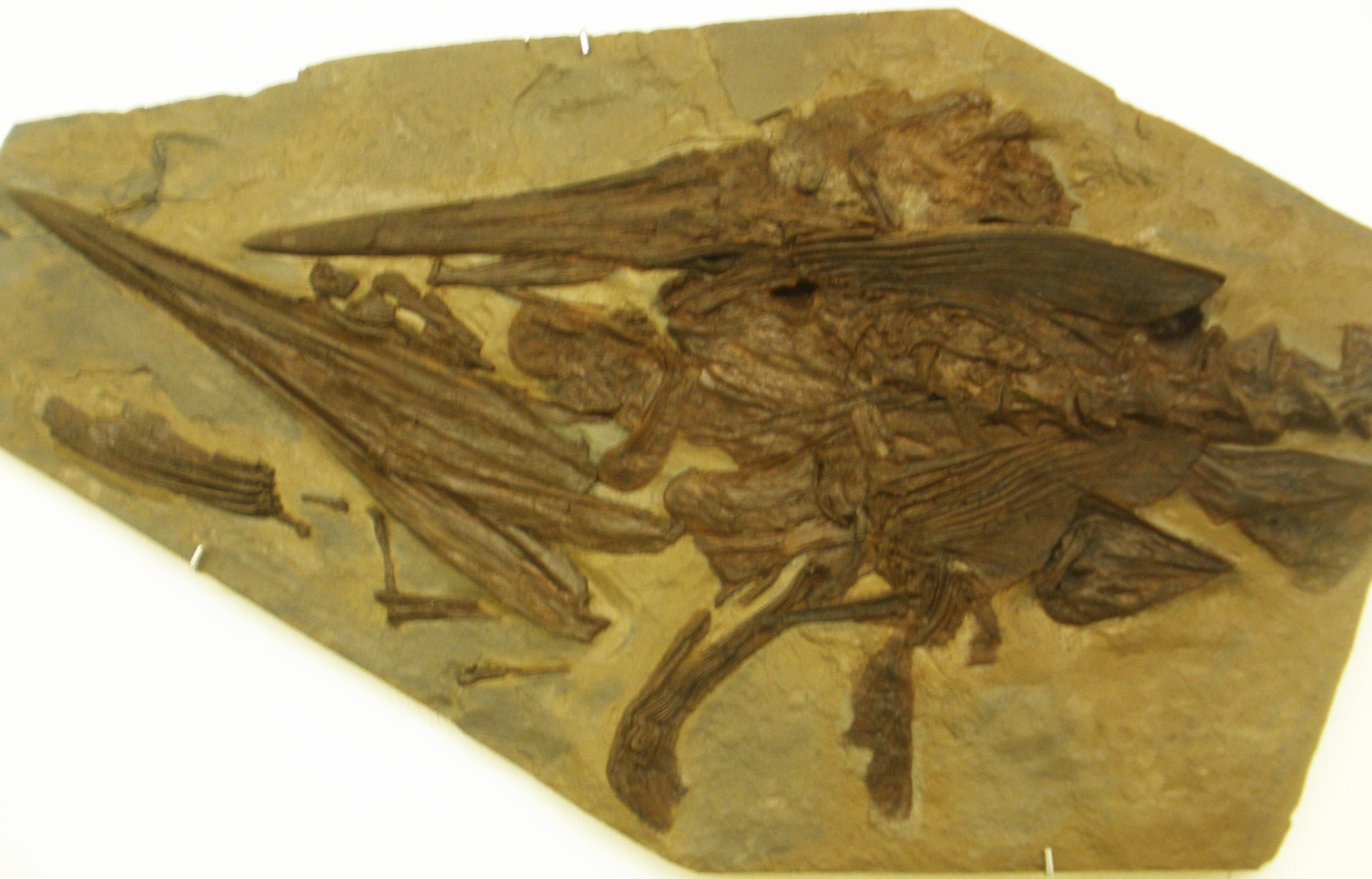
- Fossil of Xiphiorhynchus sp
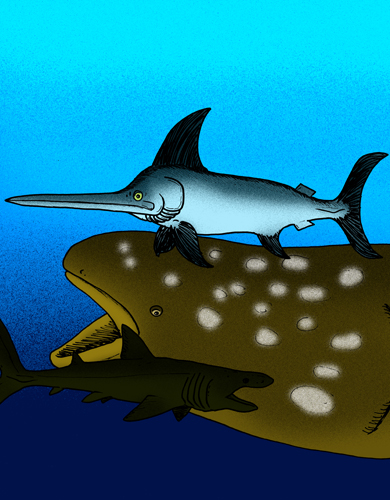
- Artist's restoration of X. rotundus

Scientific classification
- Kingdom: Animalia
- Phylum: Chordata
- Class: Actinopterygii
- Division: Teleostei
- Order: Carangiformes
- Family: †Xiphiorhynchidae
- Genus: †Xiphiorhynchus; Van Beneden, 1871

Species
- †X. aegyptiacus Weiler, 1929; †X. courcelli Arambourg, 1927; †X. elegans Van Beneden, 1871 (type); †X. eocaenicus Woodward, 1901; †X. homalorhamphus Cope, 1869; †X. hungaricus Weiler, 1943; †X. kimblalocki Fierstine & Applegate, 1974; †X. parvus Casier, 1966; †X. priscus? Agassiz, 1833; †X. rotundus Monsch et al., 2005; †X. rupeliensis Leriche, 1909

= Xiphiorhynchus =

Xiphiorhynchus Temporal range: 56–5.33 Ma

Extinct genus of fishes

Xiphiorhynchus is an extinct genus of prehistoric swordfish that lived from the Eocene until the Miocene. Unlike the modern swordfish, both the upper and lower jaws of Xiphiorhynchus were extended into blade-like points. The largest member of this genus, Xiphiorhynchus rotundus, was at least 5.1 meters in length and had an estimate weight of 708 kilograms, making it larger than any record extant billfish, and largest billfish ever known.

== Distribution ==
Fossils of Xiphiorhynchus have been found in:

=== Eocene ===
- Castle Hayne Limestone, North Carolina X. sp
- Moodys Branch Formation, Tesheva Creek, Mississippi X. eocaenicus
- Yazoo Formation, Ouachita River, Louisiana X. sp
- London Clay, Miramar Crinoid Bed, United Kingdom X. priscus, X. parvus, X. sp
- Elmore Formation, United Kingdom X. sp
- La Meseta Formation, Antarctica X. sp

=== Oligocene ===
- Chandler Bridge Formation, South Carolina X. rotunda, X. aegyptiacus

=== Miocene ===
- Pisco Formation, Sacaco, Peru X. sp
- Raz-el Ain Formation, Oran, Algeria X. sp

== See also ==
- Prehistoric fish
- List of prehistoric bony fish
