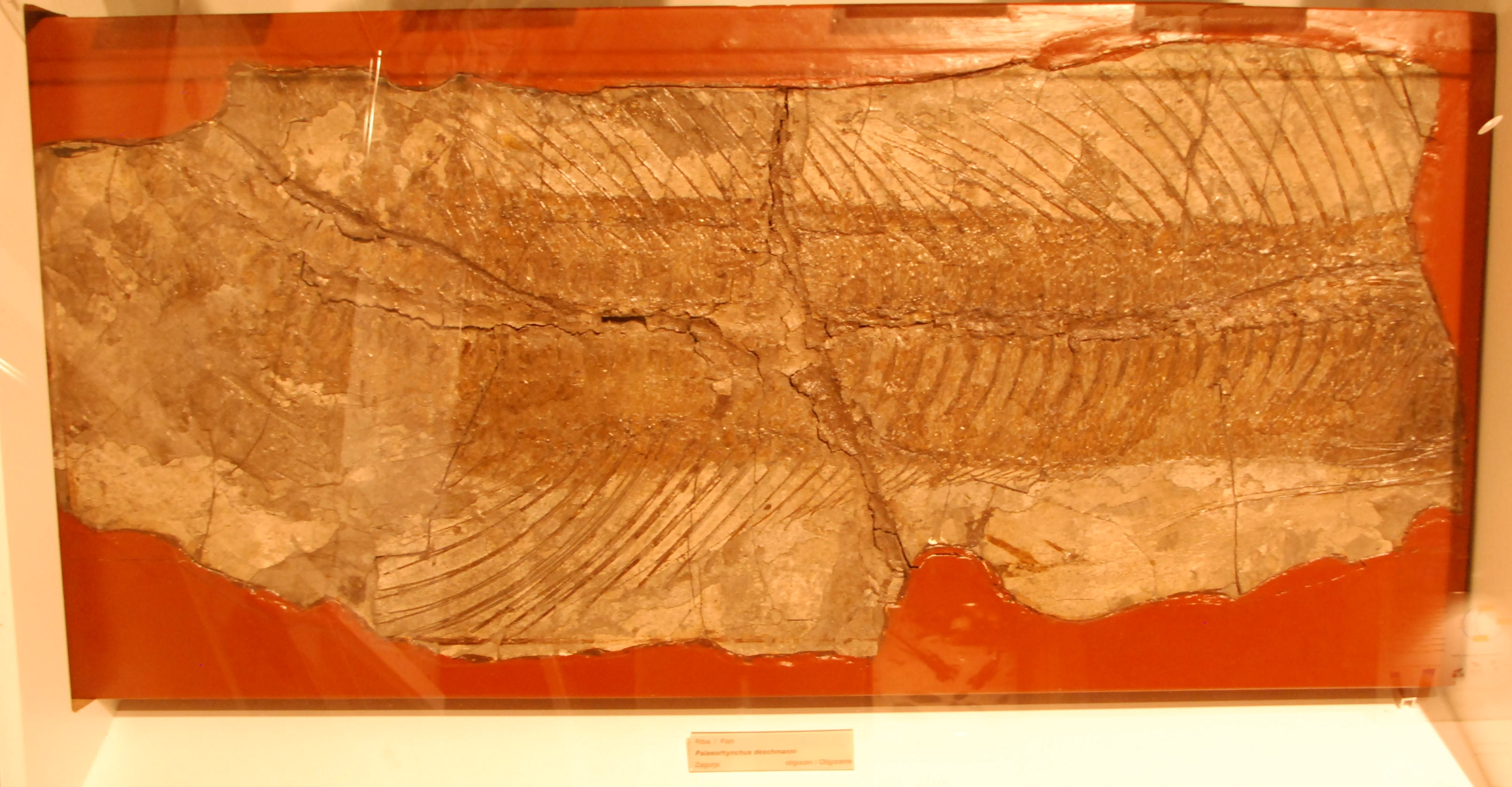
- Palaeorhynchus deschmanni, found in 1884 in the area of Zagorje ob Savi, central Slovenia

Scientific classification
- Kingdom: Animalia
- Phylum: Chordata
- Class: Actinopterygii
- Clade: Acanthomorpha
- Genus: †Palaeorhynchus (de Blainville 1818)

= Palaeorhynchus =

Palaeorhynchus Temporal range: Early Oligocene

Extinct genus of ray-finned fishes

Palaeorhynchus (meaning "old snout") is a genus of prehistoric billfish from Central and Southeastern Europe that was described by Wagner in 1860. One fossil found is dated 28.4 to 33.9 million years ago (Early Oligocene).
