= Casson Trenor =

American environmentalist, author, entrepreneur, and media personality

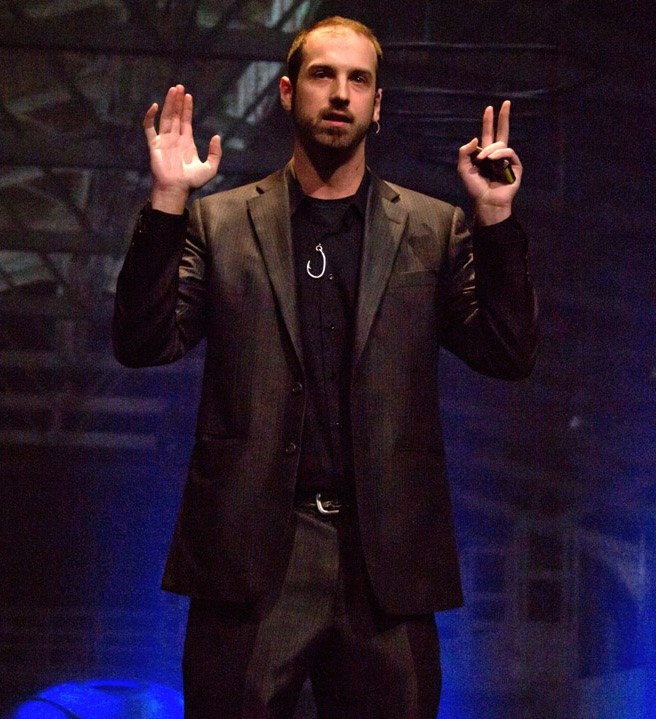
- Trenor at TEDx San Francisco (2012)
- Born: April 7, 1979 (age 47); Seattle, Washington, U.S.
- Education: Hobart and William Smith Colleges; Middlebury Institute of International Studies
- Occupations: Public speaker; ocean conservation activist; restaurateur
- Years active: 2005–present
- Known for: Environmentalist; author; social activist; pioneer of sustainable sushi
- Notable work: Umijoo (2019); Sustainable Sushi (2009)
- Awards: Time "Hero of the Environment"; US Congressional Commendation; California State Senatorial Commendation; Nautilus Book Awards Gold Medal
- Website: www.cassontrenor.com

Casson Trenor (born April 7, 1979) is an American environmentalist, author and entrepreneur known for his work in ocean conservation, sustainable seafood advocacy, and plant-based culinary innovation. He is the author of Sustainable Sushi, a reference guide on environmentally responsible seafood, and two children’s books, Umijoo and Chanarack & Tabberlox, both of which received Nautilus Book Awards Gold Medals. Trenor is known as a pioneer of the Sustainable Sushi Movement and a leader in the development of plant-based sushi restaurants.

== Early life and education ==
Aaron Casson Trenor was born on April 7, 1979, in Seattle, Washington. Soon after, he and his family moved to Mukilteo, Washington, where he attended public school and lived until the age of 17. In 2000, Trenor received a B.A. in political science from Hobart and William Smith Colleges, and is a member of Phi Beta Kappa. He then pursued an interest in cuisine and in 2001 received a chef certificate in classical French cuisine from the Pacific Institute of Culinary Arts. In 2005, Trenor received an M.A. in international environmental policy from Middlebury Institute of International Studies at Monterey, California. In May 2012, Trenor received the Alumni Achievement Award from Middlebury Institute of International Studies.

== Career ==
Following his graduation in 2005, Trenor became director for the Invasive Species Program at the Conservation Strategy Fundand collaborated with Sea Shepherd on Operation: Leviathan in Antarctica in 2005–2006, where he served under Paul Watson aboard the MV Farley Mowat during the expedition, which was later documented in Peter Heller’s book The Whale Warriors. In 2007, he joined FishWise as director of Business Development, where he began integrating his expertise in environmental policy with practical seafood sustainability initiatives.

In February 2008, Trenor co-founded Tataki Sushi and Sake Bar in San Francisco, California, alongside partners Kin Lui and Raymond Ho. Tataki became the world’s first sustainable sushi restaurant, establishing a model for sourcing seafood responsibly and minimizing the ecological impact of sushi consumption. The same year, Trenor began advocating publicly for environmentally responsible sushi, culminating in the publication of Sustainable Sushi in 2009, co-authoring a comprehensive guide to conserving ocean ecosystems through informed seafood choices.

The launch of Tataki marked the beginning of what became widely recognized as the Sustainable Sushi Movement. Other restaurateurs soon followed, either by opening new sustainable establishments, such as Bamboo Sushi in Portland, Oregon, and Aonami in Chico, California, or by converting existing conventional sushi restaurants to sustainable models, including Mashiko in Seattle, Washington, and Miya’s Sushi in New Haven, Connecticut. Over the following years, the movement expanded beyond restaurants to include retailers and grocery stores that incorporated sustainable seafood products into their offerings.

Trenor and his team expanded Tataki to two additional locations, Tataki South and Tataki Canyon, demonstrating the commercial viability of sustainable seafood in diverse market contexts.

In January 2015, the opening of Shizen Vegan Sushi Bar and Izakaya marked a significant transition for Trenor and his collaborators toward plant-based culinary solutions.

While Shizen emphasized entirely plant-based sushi, the broader Sustainable Sushi Movement continued to grow, with new restaurants adopting sustainable seafood models and offering menu items featuring underutilized species or those harvested through environmentally conscious practices. Subsequently, the Tataki South and Tataki Canyon locations were sold, enabling Trenor and his partners to develop additional fully plant-based ventures, including Tane Vegan Sushi Bar in Honolulu, which opened in 2019, and Chikyū Vegan Sushi Bar & Izakaya in Las Vegas in 2020. As of 2026, the Sustainable Sushi Movement has matured into an international trend, with a growing number of chefs, restaurants, and retailers adopting sustainable sourcing standards and emphasizing ecological responsibility in seafood preparation.

=== Environmental advocacy ===
Since 2024, Trenor has held the position of Antarctic Campaign Lead for Sea Shepherd Global, where he focuses on the reform of corporations selling krill and other Antarctic species.

Trenor joined Greenpeace as a senior markets campaigner in 2009, leading initiatives aimed at improving seafood sourcing practices among major U.S. companies. He was the primary author of Carting Away the Oceans reports 3 through 6 and co-authored Carting Away the Oceans 7 with James Mitchell, producing a series of annual analyses that evaluated corporate compliance with sustainable fishing standards. During his tenure, Trenor’s advocacy influenced policy and operations at companies including Costco, Trader Joe's, Walmart, and Safeway, combining confrontational and cooperative strategies to promote systemic changes in the seafood industry. He became a prominent public speaker and media contributor, recognized by Time magazine in 2009 as a Hero of the Environment and awarded the “Ocean Protection Hero” distinction in 2010.

== Other works ==
Trenor co-created the children’s book Umijoo with pop surrealist painter Caia Koopman, integrating ecological storytelling with fine-art illustration. Released in 2019, Umijoo won a Nautilus Book Awards Gold Medal for middle-grade fiction in 2020. Trenor later collaborated with illustrator Stephanie Law on Chanarack & Tabberlox, continuing his engagement in environmental education for young readers through narrative and visual storytelling.

Trenor is also a co-founder of Somos Axolotl, a multidisciplinary initiative combining public art, community engagement, and habitat restoration to support critically endangered axolotl populations in Xochimilco, Mexico. Additionally, he has partnered with visual activist Benjamin Von Wong on public campaigns, including The Giant Plastic Tap and the Biodiversity Jenga Tower, which translate complex environmental challenges into accessible educational experiences.

He has been featured in documentaries including Sushi: The Global Catch (2012) and The Last Ocean (2012).

== Awards ==
Trenor was named one of Time magazine's Heroes of the Environment in 2009.

In 2010, Trenor received the Ocean Protection Hero award from the Save Our Shores marine conservation NGO. He received the award: "in recognition for the sustainable seafood advocacy work he has done in the Santa Cruz area, including helping the Monterey Bay Aquarium create the well-known sustainable seafood and sushi cards."

In 2019, Trenor was honored by the California State Senate for his "visionary leadership and service to the preservation of the oceans".

Both of Trenor's children's books received the Nautilus Book Awards Gold Medal, with Umijoo honored in 2020 and Chanarack & Tabberlox in 2023. Umijoo additionally received the Moonlight Children's Book Awards Gold Medal in 2020.

== Publications ==
- Trenor, Casson, & Koopman, Caia. (2019). Umijoo. Shark & Siren Press. 72 pages. ISBN 1556437692, 978-1-7328605-0-6.
- Trenor, C., & Mitchell, J. (2013). Carting Away the Oceans 7. Greenpeace: Amsterdam, the Netherlands, 149.
- Trenor, Casson. (2009). Sustainable Sushi: A Guide to Saving the Oceans One Bite at a Time. North Atlantic Books. 110 pages. ISBN 1556437692, 978-1-55643-769-4.
- Trenor, Casson (December 23, 2022). Chanarack & Tabberlox: A Tale of Two Nereosisters. Shark & Siren Pr. ISBN 9781732860513.

== See also ==
- Miya's
- Heroes of the Environment (2009)
