= Rick Moonen =

American chef

- Born: New York City
- Education: Culinary Institute of America
- Website: www.rickmoonen.com

Rick Moonen is an American seafood chef and an early adopter of sustainable fishing practices. He is known as the "Godfather of Sustainability".

Moonen graduated from the Culinary Institute of America and then went on to work at New York City's La Côte Basque, Le Cirque, and The Water Club, where he worked for six years. He then became executive chef and partner at Oceana before he opened rm in New York, which earned three stars from The New York Times. He was also partner in the Greek Restaurant, Molyvos, which also received three stars from the New York Times. He was one of very few chefs in New York to have three stars from two separate open restaurantsIn in New York. In 2005, Moonen closed the New York Restaurant rm in order to open Rick Moonen's RM Seafood and r bar café at Mandalay Bay in Las Vegas.

Moonen is an advocate for sustainable seafood. He is a founding member of the Chef’s Coalition, Seafood Choices Alliance and a member of the Wildlife Conservation Society, Seaweb, Share our Strength, and a chef's advisory board member of Ecofish. Moonen has served as a spokesperson for American caviar and has testified several times for environmental and sustainable policy issues in Washington, D.C., and New York.

He is on the board of advisors for the French Culinary Institute, a member of the corporation and a fellow of the Culinary Institute of America, a contributing editor to Food & Wine Magazine and is a frequent guest chef at the James Beard House. In 2010, Moonen was a finalist in the second season of Bravo's Top Chef Masters.

== Restaurants ==
- Rick Moonen's RM Seafood
- Rx Boiler Room

== Awards ==
- 2016 James Beard Restaurant and Chef Awards...Best Chef : West nominee
- 2010 James Beard Award Winner for Documentary with "Chef's A Field"
- 2009 Nevada Restaurant Association Restaurateur of the Year
- 2011 Chef of the Year from Monterey Bay Aquarium
- 2013 Humanitarian of the Year Award American Culinary Federation
- 2013 USA Today Named Moonen an Earths power Player, one of five leaders helping the future health of our planet
- Inducted into the American Culinary Federation Hall of Fame
- 1993 Chef of the Year Award for the Northeast Region from Chefs in America.
- 2010Top Chef Masters Second Place Winner
- Top Chef 6: Las Vegas: Guest Judge (Restaurant Wars)
- 2006 Seafood Champion Award
