= James Alexis Darling House =

Historic house in Connecticut, United States

- U.S. National Register of Historic Places
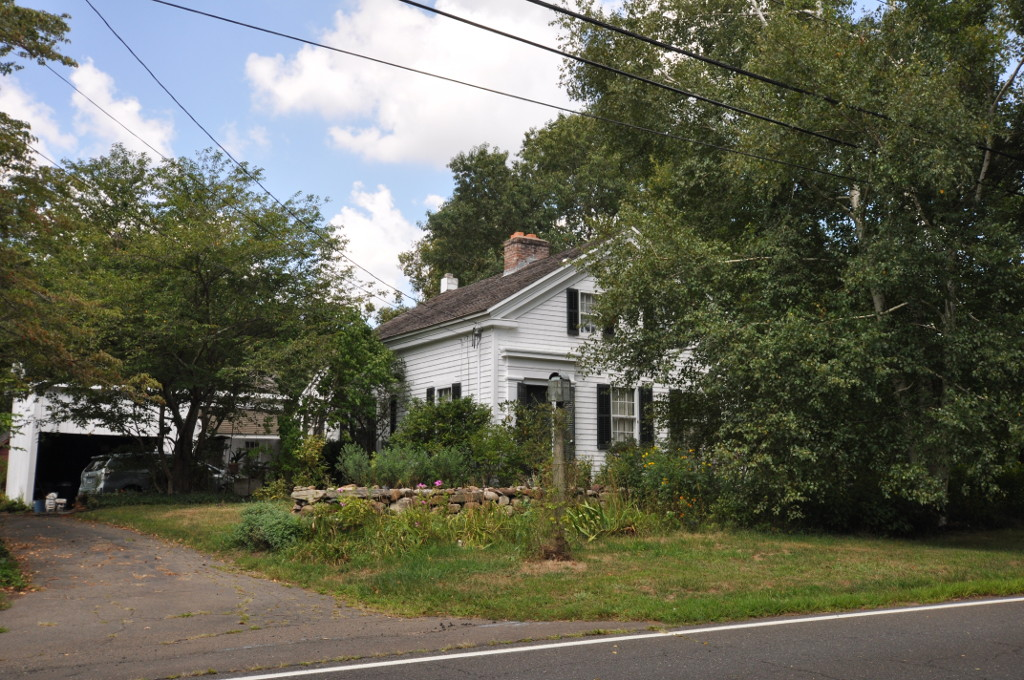

- Location within Connecticut Location within the United States
- Location: 1932 Litchfield Turnpike CT 69, Woodbridge, Connecticut
- Coordinates: 41°21′53″N 72°58′56″W
- Built: 1842
- Architect: James Alexis Darling
- Architectural style: Greek Revival
- NRHP reference No.: 100005527
- Added to NRHP: September 4, 2020

The James Alexis Darling House is a historic house at 1932 Litchfield Turnpike (CT 69) in Woodbridge, Connecticut. Built in 1842 for a grandson of Thomas Darling (whose house stands nearby), it is a good example of a rural Greek Revival farmhouse. Although built with the latest exterior styling, its construction style harkens back to 18th-century building practices. James Alexis Darling worked in the family mercantile business and moved to Woodbridge to oversee his grandfather's farm.

The house was listed on the National Register of Historic Places in 2020.

== See also ==
- National Register of Historic Places listings in New Haven County, Connecticut
