= Global Sustainable Seafood Initiative =

Sustainable seafood organization

- Formation: 2013; 13 years ago
- Type: Non-governmental organization
- Purpose: Sustainable seafood
- Headquarters: Haarlem, Netherlands
- Website: www.ourgssi.org

The Global Sustainable Seafood Initiative (GSSI) is a non-governmental organization that works to advocate for sustainable seafood through public-private partnerships.

== Background ==
Established in 2013 and headquartered in the Netherlands, the GSSI is a partner with the United Nations, Food and Agriculture Organization, United Nations Industrial Development Organization, government agencies, NGOs, and seafood companies around the world. The mission of the organization is to "ensure confidence in the supply and promotion of certified seafood as well as promote improvement efforts in seafood sustainability globally." GSSI maintains a global benchmark tool which provides formal recognition of the various seafood certification programs around the world. In 2021, the organization was a signatory to the Shanghai Declaration on Aquaculture for Food and Sustainable Development.

== See also ==
- Sustainable seafood
