= Dorjee Sun =

Australian businessman

- Born: c. 1977; Sydney, Australia
- Occupation: Social entrepreneur

Dorjee Sun (born 1977) is a social entrepreneur based in Singapore. His work for Carbon Conservation was the subject of the international feature documentary The Burning Season in 2008. He is chief executive officer of Bioeconomy as well as co-founder and Senior Advisor to the AirCarbon Exchange (ACX). He formerly was director of Who Gives, Carbon Agro, and Carbon Conservation as well as advisor and early investor in other startups.

== Early life ==
Sun was born to a Chinese father and a Tibetan mother from Darjeeling in Sydney, Australia. He grew up in northern Sydney and attended North Sydney Boys High School. He graduated from a combined Bachelor of Commerce, Bachelor of Law, and a diploma in Asian studies (Mandarin) in 2001 from the University of New South Wales. During his studies he spent two years on scholarship in Beijing, China, studying Chinese and law at Peking University.

== Career ==
Sun is the founder of a recruitment software company, as well as an award-winning education company that has mentored more than 150,000 students in Sydney and Melbourne. He has been a University of Melbourne Asialink Asia Australia Leader, Youth Chair of the Ethnic Communities Council at both national and state levels, University Law Society president, and as a member of the Education Technology Advisory Board.

Sun's company, Carbon Conservation, developed the Ulu Masen REDD+ project in Aceh, Indonesia, in 2008, along with the Provincial Government of Aceh at the time, aiming to develop 3.3 million carbon credits a year.

Sun was the subject of The Burning Season, which was a Hugh Jackman narrated feature documentary that looks at the problems of deforestation in Indonesia, issues and challenges from the farmer's perspective, the plight of the orangutans, and Sun on his quest to find a business solution. It follows him as he tries to convince potential investors from eBay, Starbucks, and Merrill Lynch to invest in a carbon trading solution that will help avoid deforestation in Indonesia while at the same time provide a living for locals.

In 2009, the African Rainforest Conservancy named a newly discovered species of blue spotted chameleon from the rainforests of Tanzania after Sun. The species was named Kinyongia dorjeesuni. This unique species, which lives in the Eastern Arc Mountains of Tanzania, is currently consider a nomen nudum, and is pending its formal species description stating those characteristics that are purported to differentiate the taxon.

Time magazine recognised Sun as one of the Heroes of the Environment (2009) for his work as a carbon-trade broker. In April 2009, he was honoured by the African Rainforest Conservancy for his work.

== Carbon Conservation Efforts ==
After the failure of the 2009 COP15 UN Climate Summit in Copenhagen to achieve a market for rainforest carbon credits, the Waxman-Markey Bill under President Obama also failed to be passed, resulting in a market collapse for the demand of rainforest carbon credits. Sun's partner in the effort, former Aceh governor Irwandi, became involved in a fight for his political life, which he lost. The new governor went cold causing the Ulu Masen REDD+ project to come to a stop.

The carbon project area was then under threat after the discovery of a gold deposit within its boundaries, so in 2011, after the failure to gain traction or support from the new governor in the midst of the virtual collapse of the carbon trading market after the 2008 financial crisis, Sun tried to continue the carbon project by combining the forest conservation programs with the gold project. He hoped this would ensure the forest carbon project and also secure the highest standards of gold operation. To facilitate this, Carbon Conservation was required to sell 50% of its shares to the Canadian mining company East Asia Minerals Corporation who had the rights to develop the gold project and as a result of this, aimed to develop a "green" mining project which would use carbon and biodiversity offsets and the latest environmentally friendly mining practices in the forest reserve forest reserve. East Asia Minerals Corporation subsequently was not able to commence mining operations due to the inability to fund certain annual payments and other payment obligations. The Sydney Morning Herald has stated that "Environmentalists have accused Sun of allowing the company to improve its chances of gaining government approval by 'greenwashing' the venture." AsienHaus deemed the Ulu Masen REDD+ project, Indonesia as a failure.

Sun has referred to himself as a "pragmatic conservationist" and despite failures and challenges with the still politically uncertain carbon markets, persists in his efforts. In 2016, Sun helped convene the Secretariat for the Fire Free Alliance that checks forest fires & haze in over 200 Indonesian Villages. The Fire Free Village Program (FFVP) expanded across provinces in Indonesia and achieved a number of successes in 2016. According to The Jakarta Post, throughout 2016, there was a 50% drop in forest fires compared to the same period in 2015.

== Virgil Capital ==
Sun met Stefan Qin whilst he was teaching an entrepreneurship course at UNSW. In May 2017. Sun invested in and played "an instrumental role" in fund raising for Virgil Capital, which was founded by Stefan Qin. He acted as a mentor to Qin whilst Qin was studying in UNSW.

4 years later, in 2021, Qin from Virgil Capital was charged with securities fraud and pled guilty to misappropriating US$90 million of investor money. The Australian Financial Review does not suggest that Sun, nor a co-founder, knew about the fraud.
