= Amity, New Haven =

Neighborhood in New Haven, Connecticut

Coordinates: 41.3347°N 72.9768°W

Amity is a residential and commercial neighborhood of the city of New Haven, Connecticut, United States. It is bounded on the northeast by West Rock Ridge State Park, on the south by the Westville neighborhood of New Haven, and on the northwest by the Flats in the town of Woodbridge, Connecticut. The official New Haven neighborhood planning maps include the traditionally separate neighborhoods of West Hills (vicinity of Valley Street) and Beverly Hills (area between Whalley Avenue and Fountain Street) within the Amity neighborhood. The neighborhood lies in the glacier-carved valley of the West River. The river flows in a southerly direction, bisecting the neighborhood.

Three primary routes serve Amity:

- Route 15, also known as the Wilbur Cross Parkway, a limited access highway which has a full interchange numbered as Exit 59 (now Exit 46) in the neighborhood.
- Route 63 (Amity Road), which runs northwest–southeast, starting in Amity.
- Route 69 (Whalley Avenue), originating in Amity and running north–south parallel to the western flank of West Rock Ridge.

Located near Amity is the western outlet of the Heroes Tunnel, a twin tunnel which carries the Wilbur Cross Parkway through approximately 1,200 feet (370 m) of solid traprock beneath West Rock Ridge. It is the only tunnel on a limited-access highway in the state of Connecticut. The southbound roadway on the Wilbur Cross Parkway ascends sharply when exiting from the Heroes Tunnel, climbing over 250 feet (76 m) in less than 2 miles (3.2 km), the steepest inclination on any limited-access highway in the State of Connecticut. When travelling northbound on the Wilbur Cross Parkway approaching toward Exit 59 (now Exit 46), the roadway descends sharply into the valley, offering a scenic vista of the West Rock Ridge, the twin tubes of the Heroes Tunnel, the City of New Haven to the south, and the glacial valley which opens to the north.

Amity is home to its namesake Amity Shopping Center, and is located approximately 2 miles (3.2 km) southeast of Amity Regional High School, which serves the neighboring towns of Woodbridge, Bethany, and Orange, Connecticut.
