= Fishery improvement project =

A fishery improvement project, or FIP, is a multi-stakeholder effort to improve the sustainability of a fishery. While FIPs vary in scope and nature, to be considered as such, a FIP must meet a number of requirements pertaining to participation, funding, transparency, and scientific rigor. By 2015, there were over 80 fishery improvement projects around the world, representing approximately 10% of the current wild seafood production. By 2021, at least registered at FisheryProgress.org Council, there are more than 130 functional FIPs around the globe.

== See also ==
- Gordon and Betty Moore Foundation
- Marine Stewardship Council
- Ocean Outcomes
- Packard Foundation
- Sustainable seafood
- WWF
- EDF
