= Water Club =

- The Water Club, a restaurant on Manhattan's East River
- The Water Club, a hotel connected to the Borgata in Atlantic City
