= Woodbridge, Connecticut =

- Town
- Town of Woodbridge
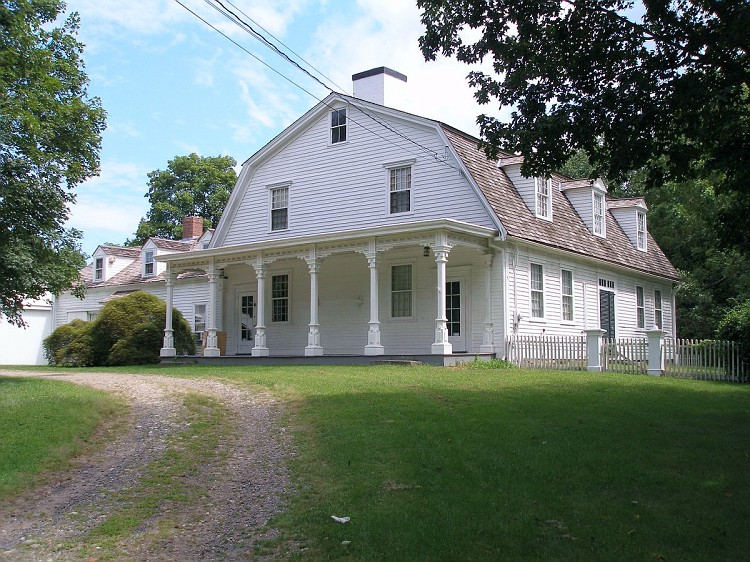
- Darling House Museum, built in 1774

- Flag Seal

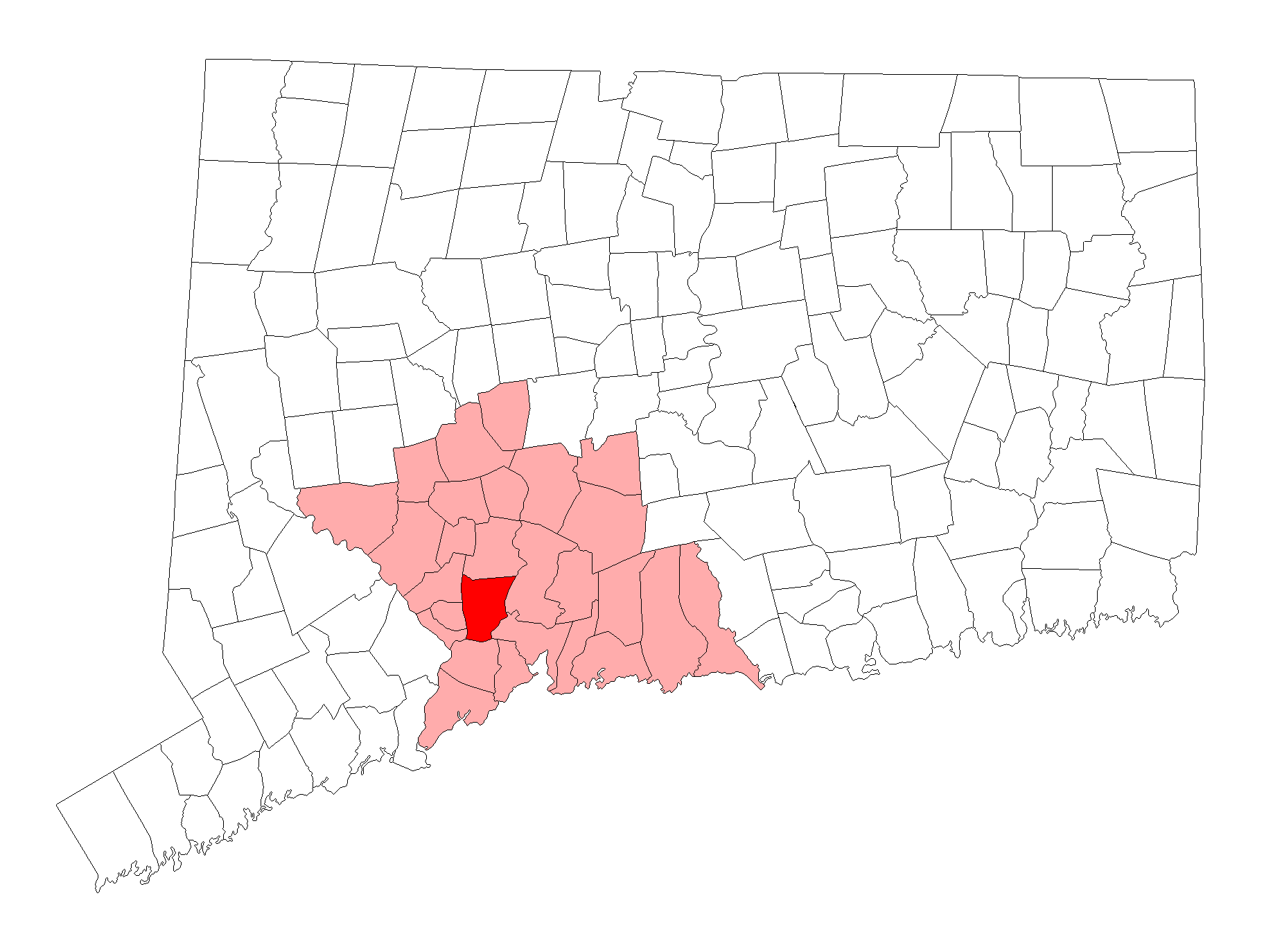
- Coordinates: 41°21′15″N 73°00′41″W
- Country: United States
- U.S. state: Connecticut
- County: New Haven
- Region: South Central CT
- Incorporated: 1784

Government
  - Type: Selectman-town meeting
  - First Selectman: Mica Cardozo (D)
  - Board of Selectmen: Sheila McCreven (D); Steve Munno. (D); David Vogel (R); Andrea Urbano (U); Maria Madonick (D)

Area
  - Total: 19.2 sq mi (49.7 km^{2})
  - Land: 18.8 sq mi (48.8 km^{2})
  - Water: 0.39 sq mi (1.0 km^{2})
- Elevation: 348 ft (106 m)

Population (2020)
  - Total: 9,087
  - Density: 482/sq mi (186/km^{2})
- Time zone: UTC-5 (Eastern)
  - Summer (DST): UTC-4 (Eastern)
- ZIP code: 06525
- Area codes: 203/475
- FIPS code: 09-87700
- GNIS feature ID: 0213539
- Website: www.woodbridgect.org

Woodbridge is a town in New Haven County, Connecticut, United States. The town is part of the South Central Connecticut Planning Region. The population was 9,087 at the 2020 census. The town center is listed on the National Register of Historic Places as Woodbridge Green Historic District. Woodbridge is part of the Amity Regional School District #5, rated the #1 school district in New Haven County and the 10th best school district in Connecticut by Niche in 2021. As of 2019, Woodbridge had the seventh highest median household income in Connecticut.

== History ==
Woodbridge was originally called "Amity", having been carved out of land originally belonging to New Haven and Milford as an independent parish in 1739. In 1742, the Rev. Benjamin Woodbridge was ordained in Amity, and it is after him that the modern town was named. Woodbridge was incorporated in 1784.

In 1661, the town was the location of one of the hideouts of the "Regicides"—three of the judges who signed the death warrant for King Charles I of England. The ruins of their hideout can be found on the nearby West Rock ridge, which runs along the town's eastern border.

Thomas Darling (1720–1789), a tutor at Yale College and later an entrepreneur in New Haven, moved to town in 1774. His home is now the Darling House Museum, operated by the Amity & Woodbridge Historical Society. The original farms of Woodbridge were located in the area of the West River Valley known as The Flats.

In the modern era, Woodbridge has undergone significant suburbanization.

Following the onset of the 2020 George Floyd protests, Woodbridge and other affluent towns in Connecticut have faced criticism from certain civic organizations alleging the practice of exclusionary zoning. In early 2021, local housing advocacy group Open Communities Alliance called upon Woodbridge to amend its zoning codes to allow for more housing developments, and enable more low-income and minority residents to live in the town. The group cited that just 0.2% of Woodbridge’s land area permits two-family dwellings. In response to efforts by the group, Woodbridge's Town Plan and Zoning Commission approved a revision in June 2021 to the town's zoning rules to allow for multi-family homes and ADUs on 2% of the town's land. The Open Communities Alliance voiced disappointment regarding the scale of the change, and filed a lawsuit alleging Woodbridge was in violation of Connecticut's Zoning Enabling Act and Fair Housing Act in August 2022 in a case which has attracted statewide attention.

== Government and politics ==
Woodbridge is governed by a 6-member Board of Selectmen.

Woodbridge's current First Selectman is Mica Cardozo, whose term expires in December 2025. This is Cardozo's first term as First Selectman. Cardozo served two terms as Deputy Selectman to former First Selectwoman Beth Heller and was appointed as Ordinance Chairman.

Cardozo was preceded as First Selectman by Democrat Beth Heller, who served in the position for three terms between 2017 and 2023. She also served briefly in the position following the death of Ed Sheehy, stepping up from her position as his deputy first selectman.

The town's previous First Selectwoman was Democrat Ellen Scalettar, who was first elected in 2013, and was re-elected in 2015. Scalettar did not seek a third term in 2017.

Prior to Scalettar, Democrat Ed Sheehy served as the town's First Selectman. He became First Selectman in April 2006. Sheehy served on the Board of Selectmen for 27 years as a regular selectman. The Board of Selectmen elected Sheehy First Selectman by a 3 to 2 vote, along party lines, to replace Amey Marella (Republican), who stepped down to accept a job as Deputy Commissioner of the Connecticut Department of Environmental Protection. Before becoming First Selectwoman in 2001, Marella was an attorney with the United States Environmental Protection Agency. Edward Sheehy was reelected in May 2009 to another two-year term. On April 22, 2013, Sheehy died suddenly at the age of 73 while still holding the First Selectman's office. He was actively seeking re-election in May. He was laid to rest on April 27, 2013.

Recent First Selectman elections
Year	Democratic candidate	Republican candidate
2023	Mica Cardozo (1,926 Votes)	Marty Halprin (1,393 Votes)
2021	Beth Heller	None
2019	Beth Heller (1,571 votes)	Ed Weinberg (1,017 votes)
2017	Beth Heller (1,820 votes)	Tony Anastasio (1,454 votes)
2015	Ellen Scalettar (1,579 votes)	Cathy Wick (1,523 votes)
2013	Ellen Scalettar	Cathy Wick

Woodbridge town vote by party in presidential elections
Year	Democratic	Republican	Third Parties
2020	67.17% 3.856	31.65% 1,817	1.18% 68
2016	62.42% 3,333	33.97% 1,814	3.61% 193
2012	58.39% 3,018	40.80% 2,109	0.81% 42

== Education ==
=== Elementary school ===
Beecher Road School is the town's pre Kindergarten-Grade 6 school.

=== Middle school ===
As part of the Amity school system, Woodbridge shares a middle school with the town of Bethany, which is located north of Woodbridge.

=== High school ===
Woodbridge also shares the Amity Regional High School with the neighboring towns of Bethany and Orange. The high school is located in Woodbridge's town center area.

Woodbridge is home to Ezra Academy, a regional Jewish day school whose students reside in 21 towns throughout New Haven and Fairfield counties.

== Geography ==
According to the United States Census Bureau, the town has a total area of 19.2 square miles (50 km^{2}), of which 18.8 square miles (49 km^{2}) is land and 0.4 square miles (1.0 km^{2}) is water. The total area is 2.03% water.

Woodbridge is informally divided into two distinct parts: central Woodbridge, which occupies the western hilly side of town; and the area known as The Flats, which occupies the eastern slice of town, bordering West Rock and the New Haven neighborhood of Westville.

Neighboring towns are Bethany to the north, Hamden to the east, New Haven, and West Haven to the southeast, Orange to the south, and Derby, Ansonia, and Seymour to the west.

=== Parks and hiking trails ===
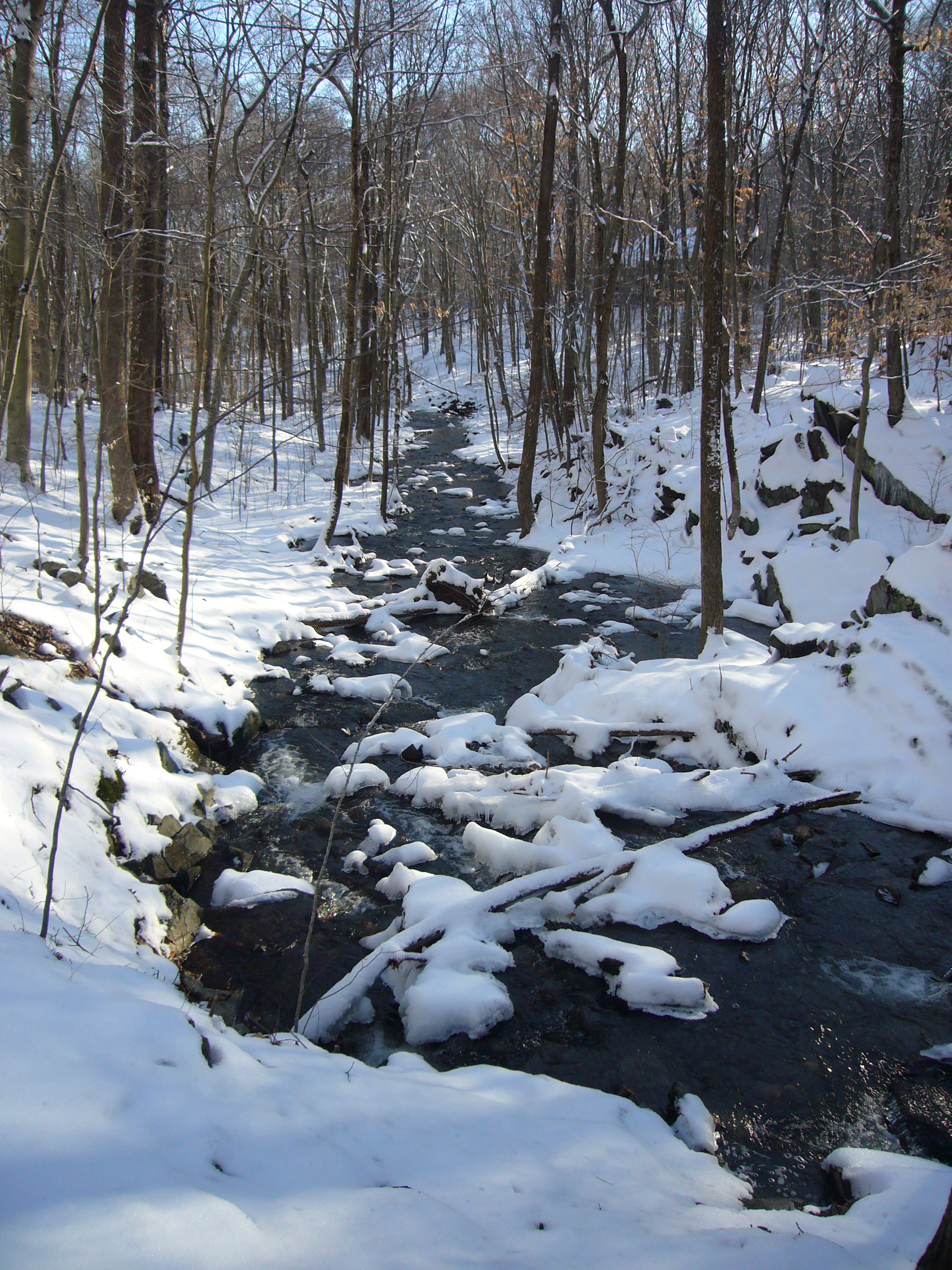
Below Wepawaug Falls in Woodbridge

Woodbridge is home to several organizations that protect undeveloped land and historic sites, including the Woodbridge Land Trust and the Woodbridge Park Association. The town has an extensive system of preserved hiking trails open to the public, notably the 93-acre (380,000 m^{2}) Alice Newton Street Memorial Park and the 22-acre (89,000 m^{2}) Wepawaug Falls area. Some of the land has been donated by residents.

== Demographics ==
Historical population
Census	Pop.	Note	%±
1820	1,988		—
1850	912		—
1860	872		−4.4%
1870	829		−4.9%
1880	926		11.7%
1890	926		0.0%
1900	852		−8.0%
1910	878		3.1%
1920	1,170		33.3%
1930	1,630		39.3%
1940	2,262		38.8%
1950	2,822		24.8%
1960	5,182		83.6%
1970	7,673		48.1%
1980	7,761		1.1%
1990	7,924		2.1%
2000	8,983		13.4%
2010	8,990		0.1%
2020	9,087		1.1%
U.S. Decennial Census

As of the census of 2020, there were 9,087 people, 2,897 households, and 2,353 families in the town. The population density was 477.0 inhabitants per square mile (184.2/km^{2}). There were 3,476 housing units at an average density of 169.3 per square mile (65.4/km^{2}). The racial makeup of the town was 74.5% White, 3.07% African American, 0.17% Native American, 13.3% Asian, 0.033% Pacific Islander, 1.91% from other races, and 6.99% from two or more races. 6.02% of the population were Hispanic or Latino of any race.

Out of 2,897 households, there were 2,353 families in which 70% were married couple family households, 13.9% female householder with no spouse present, and 10.5% male householder with no spouse present. 36% of households have one or more person under the age of 18. 61.1% of the population is actively married. 13.7% of all households were made up of individuals, and 9.1% had someone living alone who was 65 years of age or older. The average family size was 3.31. 5.8% of the population was under the age of 5, 23.2% of the population was under the age of 18, 76.8% of the population was 18 years and over, and 24.8% were 65 years of age or older. The median age was 49.3 years. For every 100 females, there were 100.7 males.

The median income for a household in the town was $157,610, and the median income for a family was $166,546. As of 2010, males had a median income of $105,632 versus $70,286 for females. The per capita income for the town was $69,179. 3.5% of the population and 1.4% of families were below the poverty line. 3.3% of those under the age of 18 and 4% of those 65 and older were living below the poverty line.

Voter registration and party enrollment as of October 27, 2020
Party	Active voters	Inactive voters	Total voters
Republican	1,305	119	1,424
Democratic	2,645	243	2,888
Unaffiliated	2,627	431	3,058
Minor Parties	95	9	104
Total	6,672	802	7,474

== Other ==
- The sulfur match was invented in Woodbridge by Samuel Beecher and Thomas Sanford in 1835.
- Woodbridge is often mentioned on the CW show Gilmore Girls as a rival of Stars Hollow, a fictional Connecticut town. Per the show, Woodbridge is to the east of Stars Hollow.
- Because of its proximity to Yale and its good school district, Woodbridge is considered one of the most educated towns in Connecticut. In 2011, Woodbridge had the highest percentage of residents with graduate or professional degrees in Connecticut.

== Notable people ==
- Guido Calabresi, U.S. Court of Appeals for the Second Circuit judge and Yale Law School professor
- Charles Edward Clark, jurist and politician
- Wilson Hart Clark, state politician and lawyer
- David Gelernter, author and Yale University professor of computer science
- Suzanne Greco, businesswoman
- Boone Guyton, businessman, author, and WWII test pilot
- John Hollander, poet and literary critic
- Dorit Kemsley, fashion designer and television personality in The Real Housewives of Beverly Hills
- David Aaron Kessler, physician and former FDA commissioner
- Bun Lai, author, and creator the first sustainable sushi in the world, Miya's
- Jeremy Leven, Hollywood screenwriter, director, producer, and novelist
- Jonathan Mostow, film director, producer, screenwriter
- Paul Roessler, musician, composer, and producer
- Tarek Saleh, NFL linebacker
- Louise Shaffer, actress, scriptwriter, and author
- Bernie S. Siegel, author and pediatric surgeon
- Maury Yeston, Tony Award-winning Broadway composer and lyricist
- Josh Zeid, American-Israeli baseball player

== Notable locations ==
=== On the National Register of Historic Places ===
- Darling House Museum – added to the National Register of Historic Places in 1979
- Dr. Andrew Castle House – added to the National Register of Historic Places in 2000
- New England Cement Company Kiln and Quarry – added to the National Register of Historic Places in 2001
- Woodbridge Green Historic District – added to the National Register of Historic Places in 2003
- Chatfield Farmstead – added to the National Register of Historic Places in 2010
- James Alexis Darling House – added to the National Register of Historic Places in 2020
