= Woodbridge International =

- Company type: Private
- Industry: Mergers and Acquisitions
- Founded: 1993
- Founder: Robert M. Koenig (CEO)
- Headquarters: Woodbridge, CT, US
- Website: woodbridgegrp.com

Woodbridge International is a global mergers and acquisitions firm specializing in middle-market businesses in the U.S. and Canada. Established in 1993 as Woodbridge Group LLC, it is headquartered in Woodbridge, CT, in New Haven County.

== History ==
Woodbridge Group LLC was founded by Robert M. Koenig in 1993. In 2008, the company started WG Securities LLC and opened its European office in the Netherlands.

In 2012, an office was opened in São Paulo, Brazil. In 2014, Woodbridge International expanded its operations to Frankfurt, Germany. That same year, the firm started working in Japan and Poland.

In 2018, Woodbridge International introduced its 150-day Timeline-Driven Auction. Furthermore, the firm expanded its Cape Town office and published a book titled "How to Sell Your Mid-Size Business." Next year the company published its 9th book, titled “32 Businesses Sold in 2022.” At the end of 2022, Woodbridge International beat industry expectations with a record 32 closed deals, generating $619 million in liquidity for its clients.

In 2023, Woodbridge International held a conference in Cape Town South Africa celebrating 30 years in business. The same year the firm emailed their 10th book to 250,000 business owners – 30 Years of Lessons Learned Selling Middle-Market Businesses.

In August 2024, Woodbridge International announced its acquisition by Mariner Wealth Advisors, a national financial services firm. This partnership connects Woodbridge’s Sell-Side M&A expertise and Mariner’s wealth advisory services to offer an integrated approach for their clients. The acquisition represents a significant growth and expansion opportunity for Woodbridge International. The firm is reported to have a clear path to potentially doubling its business in the coming years.
