= Heroes of the Environment (2009) =

Topic of Time Magazine special issue

Heroes of the Environment is a list published in Time magazine. The third list was published in September 2009. It contains 30 entries, individuals or groups, that have contributed substantially to the preservation of environment. It is divided into four categories: Leaders and Visionaries, Activists, Scientists and Innovators, and Moguls and Entrepreneurs.

== Leaders and Visionaries ==
- Mohamed Nasheed
- Cameron Diaz
- Mike H. Pandey
- Prince Mostapha Zaher
- Marcio Santilli
- Yann Arthus-Bertrand
- Erik Solheim
- Steven Chu, Carol Browner, Ken Salazar and Lisa P. Jackson

== Activists ==
- Joe Romm
- Marc Ona
- Father Marco Arana
- Syeda Rizwana Hasan
- Yuyun Ismawati
- Zhao Zhong
- Nnimmo Bassey

== Scientists and Innovators ==
- Takashi Yabe
- Residents of Vauban
- Valerie Casey
- David Keith (scientist)
- Bindeshwar Pathak
- Olga Speranskaya
- Pen Hadow, Martin Hartley, and Ann Daniels
- Nathan Lorenz and Tim Bauer

== Moguls and Entrepreneurs ==
- Sheri Liao
- Thomas Harttung
- Dorjee Sun
- Asim Buksh
- Kin Lui, Raymond Ho and Casson Trenor
- Yumi Someya
- Bill Weihl, Google.org's green energy czar

== See also ==
- Environmental Media Awards
- Global 500 Roll of Honour
- Global Environmental Citizen Award
- Goldman Environmental Prize
- Grantham Prize
- Tyler Prize for Environmental Achievement
- Nuclear-Free Future Award
