= Dr. Andrew Castle House =

Historic house in Connecticut, United States

- U.S. National Register of Historic Places
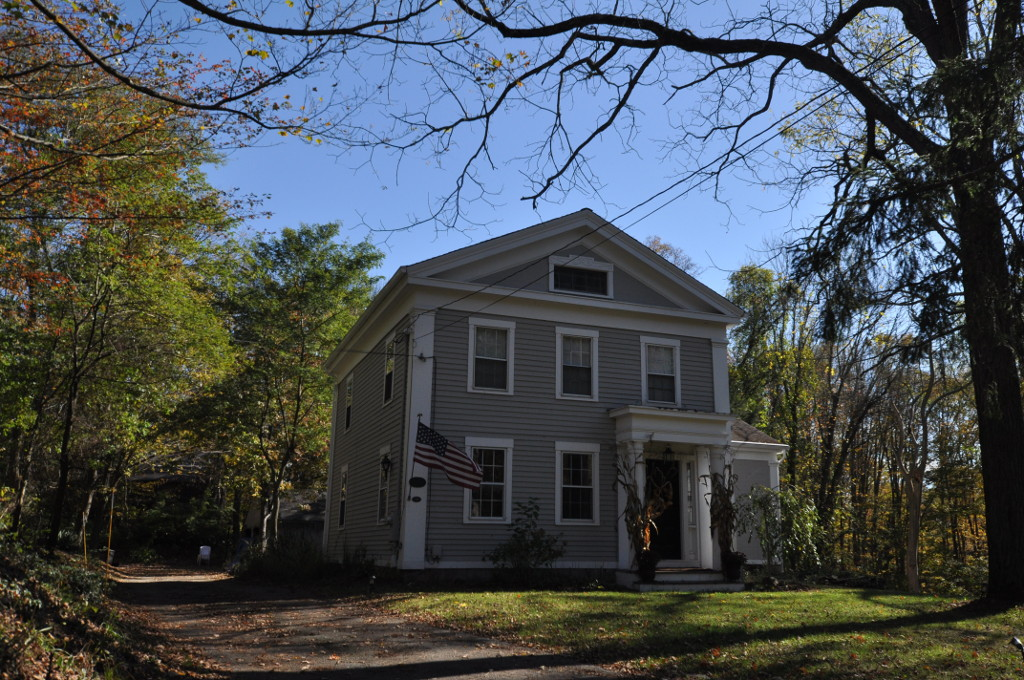

- Location within Connecticut Location within the United States
- Location: 555 Amity Road, Woodbridge, Connecticut
- Coordinates: 41°22′38″N 73°00′04″W
- Area: 1.5 acres (0.61 ha)
- Built by: Sperry, George R.
- Architectural style: Greek Revival
- NRHP reference No.: 00000299
- Added to NRHP: March 31, 2000

The Dr. Andrew Castle House, also known as the Castle-Russell House, is a historic house at 555 Amity Road (CT 63) in Woodbridge, Connecticut. Built in 1838, it is a locally distinguished example of high-style Greek Revival architecture, and is notable as the home of three prominent local physicians. It was listed on the National Register of Historic Places in 2000.

== Description and history ==
The Castle House is located in a rural setting of northeastern Woodbridge, on the east side of Amity Road (CT 63). It is set on a rise overlooking the road, a short way south of its Junction with Seymour Road (CT 67). It is a 2 1/2-story wood-frame structure, with a gabled roof and clapboarded exterior. Corner pilasters rise to a broad entablature on the front facade, above which the gable is fully pedimented, with a rectangular window in its center. The facade is three bays wide, with the main entrance in the right bay. It is sheltered by a well-proportioned portico, with Doric columns rising to an entablature and corniced flat roof. A period wing extends to the south at a setback to the rear, with a flushboarded facade and shedroof portico at the inside corner. A late 19th-century ell extends to the rear.

The house was probably built not long after Dr. Andrew Castle purchased the land from David Hotchkiss in 1838. Its construction is attributed to George Sperry, a local master builder, on the basis of its similarity to two other houses he is known to have built. The house is particularly distinguished for its interior and exterior craftsmanship, which are particularly fine in a town known for high quality 19th century architecture. In addition to Dr. Castle, the house's owners have included Dr. David Elwood, a doctor and clergyman, and Dr. Thomas Russell, a doctor from New Haven.

== See also ==
- National Register of Historic Places listings in New Haven County, Connecticut
