= Sustainable seafood advisory lists and certification =

Government policies on seafood supply

Sustainable seafood advisory lists and certification programs are public policies designed to support transparent seafood supply chains and to help consumers make informed purchasing decisions that reflect resource stewardship and sustainable seafood considerations.

While the economic impact of seafood advisory lists and certification is unclear, there are measurable non-monetary signals, including enhanced reputation, improved stakeholder relationships, and restructuring of supply chain management.

== Guides and advisory lists ==
- Aquarium of the Bay Sustainable Seafood Alliance https://www.aquariumofthebay.org/conservation/sustainable/
- InSeason Fish A sustainable seafood guide for India
- Marine Conservation Society (MCS), Good Fish Guide (UK and Northeast Atlantic)
- The Monterey Bay Aquarium Seafood Watch (recommendations)
- The Seafood Guide developed by Good Fish Foundation and WWF Europe
- Greenpeace: Seafood Red list
- Australian Marine Conservation Society (AMCS) produces Australia's Sustainable Seafood Guide
- Royal Forest and Bird Protection Society of New Zealand, Best Fish Guide
- Audubon Society's National Seafood Wallet Card (US)
- Monterey Fish Market Seafood advisory list (West Coast, US)
- Canada's Seafood Guide (SeaChoice), initiative of Sustainable Seafood Canada
- The Environmental Justice Foundation (EJF) Consumer Guide To Prawns

== Certification and labelling ==
- The Marine Stewardship Council has a certification program for consumer seafood products, and lists certified products on its website
- Ocean Wise, a conservation program navigating the world of sustainable seafood.
- Sustainable Fishery Advocates operates the FishWise program for labeling seafood by retailers.
- Friends of the Sea is an independent organization that developed certification schemes for products from sustainable fisheries and aquaculture. The certification schemes also include standards for the reduction of carbon footprint and social accountability.

== Consumer health ==
- Oceana's Campaign to Stop Seafood Contamination (USA)

== See also ==
- Conservation status
- Ecolabel
- Ethical consumerism
- Overfishing
- Fisheries conservation organizations
