= The Flats (Woodbridge) =

Coordinates: 41.352°N 72.997°W

The Flats is a neighborhood located in the southeastern end of Woodbridge, Connecticut, in the West River valley area that runs between the hilly western part of town and the rock formation known as West Rock. The West River valley continues into the city of New Haven. The Flats is bounded on the northeast by West Rock Ridge, on the south by the Amity neighborhood of New Haven, and on the northwest by an incline in elevation above which lies the highlands of Woodbridge. This region was called “Shushuck” by Native Americans.

The Flats is Woodbridge's main commercial section, with mixed-use residential, recreational and retail zoning. CT Route 63 and CT Route 69 are the primary roads in this neighborhood, which form major north–south arterials between New Haven and northern towns like Bethany and the Naugatuck River Valley region beyond. CT Route 15/The Wilbur Cross Parkway runs east-west through The Flats to intersect with CT-63 and CT-69.
