= New England Cement Company Kiln and Quarry =

Archaeological site in Connecticut, United States

- U.S. National Register of Historic Places
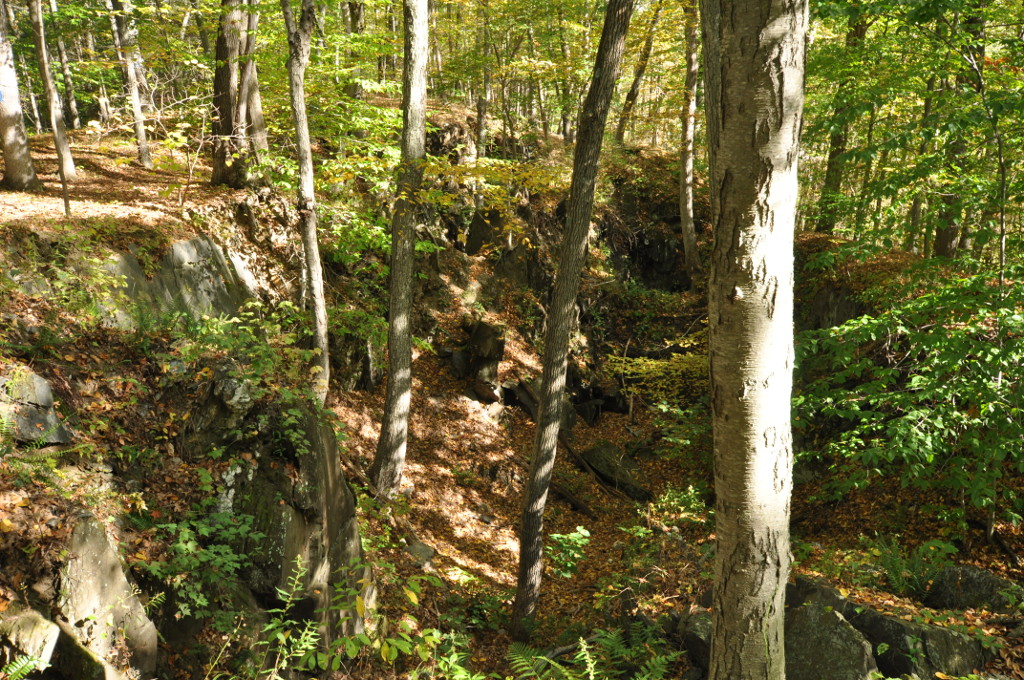
- View of the quarry site

- Location within Connecticut Location within the United States
- Location: West Bishop conservation land off Litchfield Turnpike, Woodbridge, Connecticut
- Coordinates: 41°22′36″N 72°58′40″W
- Built: 1847
- NRHP reference No.: 00001454
- Added to NRHP: April 25, 2001

The New England Cement Company Kiln and Quarry are a historic archaeological industrial site in Woodbridge, Connecticut. Located on and near a ridge paralleling Litchfield Turnpike, the site includes two components: a stone kiln used for processing cement, and a hand-dug quarry from which limestone used in the cement manufacture was taken. The site has an industrial history dating to 1847; the kiln, which survives in deteriorated condition, dates to 1874.

A modern account of the demise of this business states there is "evidence of a nineteenth century scam" in which investors lost money. According to a 2013 article in The New York Times,"The concept was simple, toss local rock into the large stone furnace and wait until it melts. Then out comes fine cement. In this case the local bedrock proved unusable and produced an inferior product. Speculation is that the first batch was hauled into New Haven and dumped into the harbor more than 100 years ago." However this is contradicted by a more contemporaneous account by U.S. Congressman Nehemiah D. Sperry as recounted in a local newspaper's coverage of his 1895 trip through this area where he grew up. Sperry said, "And here we are opposite the dam. Just over there on the hillside are the ruins of the old cement kiln, where twenty-five years ago they made cement from the rocks that are so abundant around it. It was good cement, but the business failed and was killed because cement was a cheap article and because it took off all the profits to cart the stuff to New Haven. Perhaps some day an electric road will come by here and then the business might be profitably worked."

The site was listed on the National Register of Historic Places in 2001.

== See also ==
- National Register of Historic Places listings in New Haven County, Connecticut
