= SeaWeb =

Ocean conservation organization

- Formation: 1996
- Headquarters: Washington, D.C.
- Official language: English, French
- Owner: The Ocean Foundation
- President: Mark J. Spalding
- Website: https://web.archive.org/web/20200807202231/http://seaweb.org/

SeaWeb is a nonprofit ocean conservation organization. Its mission is to raise public awareness, to advance science-based solutions, and mobilize decision-makers around ocean conservation. SeaWeb was founded in 1996 by the Environment Group of the Pew Charitable Trust as an initiative to promote ocean conservation issues for Americans. In 1999, SeaWeb became an independent 501(c)(3) organization, funded mostly from private charitable foundations, but also from individual contributions. In 2015, SeaWeb became part of The Ocean Foundation.

== Seafood Summit ==
The SeaWeb Seafood Summit brings together representatives from the global seafood industry, as well as leaders from the conservation community, academia, government, and the media. The stated aim of the summit is to advance sustainable seafood practices by fostering dialogue and partnerships intended to support an environmentally, socially, and economically sustainable seafood marketplace. The conference is produced in partnership by SeaWeb and Diversified Communications.

Past summits have included:

- 2019 — Bangkok, Thailand
- 2018 — Barcelona, Spain
- 2017 — Seattle, Washington
- 2016 — St. Julian's, Malta
- 2015 — New Orleans, Louisiana
- 2012 — Hong Kong
- 2011 — Vancouver, Canada
- 2010 — Paris, France
- 2009 — San Diego, California
- 2008 — Barcelona, Spain
- 2007 — Jacksonville, Florida
- 2006 — Seattle, Washington
- 2004 — Chicago, Illinois
- 2003 — Providence, Rhode Island
- 2002 — Washington, DC

== Seafood Champion Awards ==
The Seafood Champion Awards were started in 2006 to annually recognize individuals and companies for outstanding leadership in promoting environmentally responsible seafood. SeaWeb established the award to honor those in the seafood industry whose past and/or present contributions demonstrate a commitment to innovation that leads to change.

== See also ==
- Seafood Choices Alliance
