= Bun Lai =

Chef

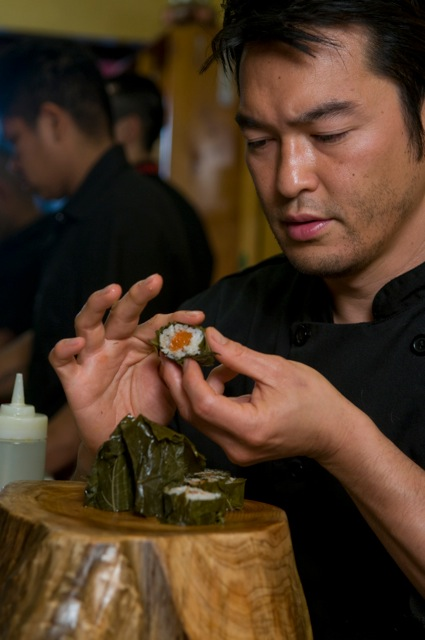
- Born: 1969 (age 56–57); Hong Kong
- Occupations: Chef, restaurateur
- Years active: 1992–present
- Known for: Miya's, sustainable sushi, sustainable seafood

Bun Lai (born 1969) is a Hong Kong-born American chef. He is a leader in the sustainable food movement. His family restaurant, Miya's in New Haven, Connecticut, is the first sustainable sushi restaurant in the world. His mother, who received an award from U.S. Representative Rosa DeLauro for her contribution in sustainable seafood, is the founder of Miya's and his father is a Cambridge and Yale University-educated scientist and surgeon.

Bun Lai's work as the chef of Miya's and as a leader in the sustainability movement has been featured in local and national publications (see "Media" below).

== Career ==
In 2001, Bun Lai initiated the removal from the menu of seafood that was caught or farmed in a way that was detrimental to the long term well-being of the harvested species or its habitats. Bun Lai is credited as the first chef in the world to implement a sustainable seafood paradigm to the cuisine of sushi. The sweet potato sushi roll, which Bun Lai created in 1995 at Miya's, is the California Roll of plant-based sushi. Today it can be found on sushi menus throughout the country. The use of brown rice — instead of white rice — and other whole grains for sushi, is also a Bun Lai innovation, which today is emulated throughout the world of sushi.

Chef Bun Lai created the first menu dedicated to the idea of using invasive species at Miya's in 2005, during which time half the menus invasive species offerings were conceptual because invasive species were not yet commercially available. The menu featured locally caught invasive species such as Asian shore crabs and European green crabs. The invasive species menu was created in order to take pressure off of popular over-fished species by utilizing ones, instead, that are abundant but ecologically destructive. Today, Miya's offers a plethora of invasive species such as Chesapeake blue catfish, Florida lionfish, Kentucky silver carp, Georgia cannonball jellyfish, and invasive edible plants such as Connecticut Japanese knotweed and Autumn olive. In 2013, Bun Lai's use of cicadas in sushi was satirized by Saturday Night Live, though in 2021 the New York Times praised his use of the insects as part of his mission "to encourage diners to eat in an environmentally conscious way."

Bun Lai is the former Director of Nutrition for a non-for-profit that serves low income diabetics."

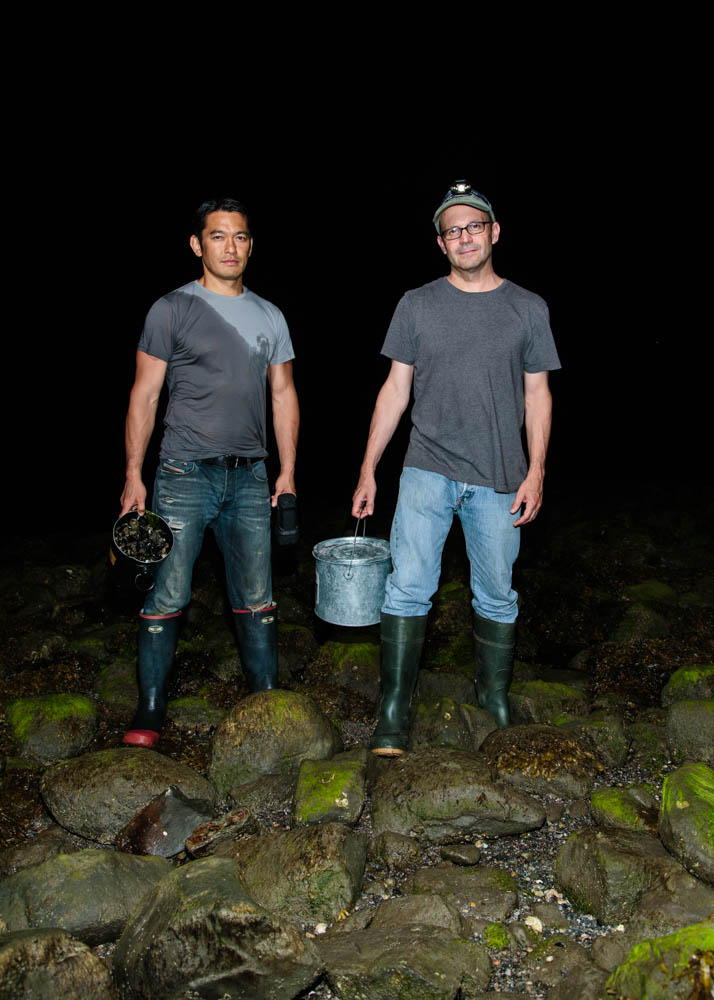
Chef Bun Lai and conservation biologist, Dr. Joe Roman, hunting for invasive Asian shore crabs in Connecticut.

Bun Lai has authored papers which were published in Scientific American, Harvard Design Magazine, and The Hill (see "Publications" below). He has spoken at the White House, the Harvard School of Public Health, the American Fisheries Society, the World Wildlife Fund, and the National Geographic Society.

== Publications ==
- What's the best way to control ecological pests? Feed them to the world's greatest predator—us, Scientific American (2013).
- Why fight them when we can eat them? Harvard Design Magazine (2014).
- Why we need traceable seafood, The Hill (2021).

== Documentaries and Podcast Appearances ==
- "Little Fish," The New Yorker, dir. Edward Columbia (2021).
- "Blind Sushi," dir. Eric Heimbold (2018).
- "Experimental Insect Sushi Rolls with Miya's of New Haven," Vice Munchies (2016).
- "Wild Food: Conversations With Chef Bun Lai + Local Foragers," NPR.
- "Kevin Estela and Bun Lai talk Food and Sustainability," Fieldcraft Survival.

== Media ==
- "Lionfish and Friends: How Chefs Tackle Invasive Fish," National Geographic.
- "Should I Eat Sushi?" Time Magazine.
- "Safer Sushi," The New York Times.
- "Meet The Sustainable Sushi Chef Who Also Lassoes Giant Jellyfish The Size Of Volkswagens," Prevention.
- "Sushi Master Bun Lai's Sushi Recipes for the Future," Eating Well.
- "Have You Ever Tried to Eat a Feral Pig?" The Atlantic.
- "Alien Entrées," The New Yorker.
- "The Truth is in the Muck," Popular Mechanics.
- "Can Sushi Save The World? How Chef Bun Lai Leads a Sustainability Revolution of Love," Gotham.
- "Watch Brianna Keilar eat dead cicadas on live TV," CNN.
- "5 Food Activists Connecting Hearts and Histories to Heal a Broken System," BMO.

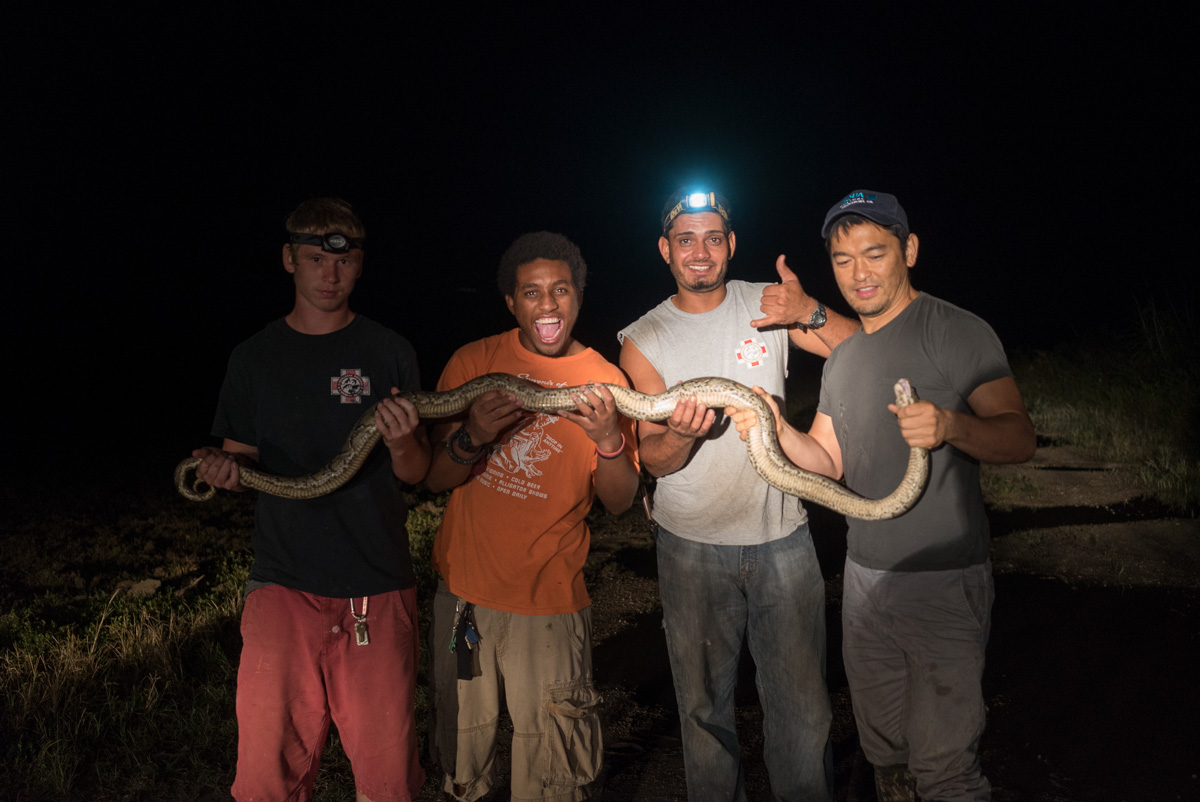
Bun Lai hunting invasive python

== Accolades ==
- Top Ten Hottest Chefs in the World, 2016.
- 2018 James Beard Foundation Broadcast Media Documentary Finalist, Blind Sushi
- White House Champion of Change for Sustainable Seafood Award
- 2013 James Beard Foundation Nominee: Best Chef Northeast
- An EcoSalon 11 Most Influential Chefs in the U.S.
- New Haven 50 Most Influential Person
- Huffington Post's Greatest Person of the Day
- Recipient of the Yale Elm-Ivy Award.
