= Wilson Hart Clark =

American politician (1820–1887)

Member of the Connecticut State Senate
- In office 1859–1860

Personal details
- Born: 1820 Woodbridge, Connecticut, U.S.
- Died: May 13, 1887 (aged 66–67) Ansonia, Connecticut, U.S.
- Resting place: Pine Grove Cemetery; Ansonia, Connecticut, U.S.
- Spouse: Julia Elizabeth Cable (m. 1849)
- Children: 4
- Education: Yale College
- Occupation: Politician; lawyer

Wilson Hart Clark (1820 – May 13, 1887) was an American lawyer and politician from Connecticut.

== Early life ==
Wilson Hart Clark was born in 1820 in Woodbridge, Connecticut. He assisted his father on the family farm. At the age of 20, he left home to study in Wilbraham, Massachusetts. He graduated from Yale Law School in 1845.

== Career ==
Following graduation, Clark practiced law in New Haven. He practiced law for more than 30 years.

Clark served as a member of the Common Council of New Haven. He was also prosecuting attorney. He served as a member of the Connecticut State Senate from 1859 to 1860. He served as an ex officio member of the Yale Corporation.

Clark was involved in real estate. He purchased the Lighthouse Point tract of land in New Haven. He invested in mining stocks and lost money.

== Personal life ==
Clark married Julia Elizabeth Cable of Oxford, Connecticut, in 1849. They had three daughters and one son.

Clark died on May 13, 1887, at the home of his daughter in Ansonia, Connecticut. He was buried at Pine Grove Cemetery in Ansonia.
