= Ocean Outcomes =

International nonprofit organization

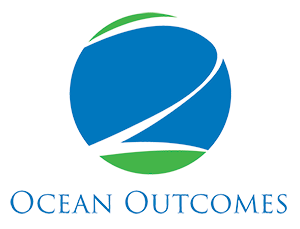
- Abbreviation: O2
- Formation: 2015; 11 years ago
- Location: Global
- Staff: 16
- Website: www.oceanoutcomes.org

Ocean Outcomes (O2) is an international nonprofit organization which works with commercial fisheries, seafood industry, local communities, government, NGOs, and other fishery stakeholders to develop and implement solutions towards more sustainable fisheries. O2's work includes fishery assessments, fishery improvement projects (FIPs), buyer engagement programs, supply chain analysis, and other contractual fishery-related work. Founded in 2015, O2 has team members and fishery projects across Northeast Asia, including on the ground operations in China, Japan, and South Korea.

== History ==
While O2 launched as an independent organization in 2015, O2's sustainable fisheries work dates back to the early 2000s as State of the Salmon, a science-based program created in 2003 in collaboration with Ecotrust and Wild Salmon Center which used data to track the health and trends of wild salmon populations. This data was then analyzed, and used to inform salmon management and conservation throughout the Pacific Rim. As O2, this sustainable fisheries work has expanded beyond salmon fisheries to include tuna, crab, perch, and other species, and beyond salmon-specific projects to include Illegal, unreported and unregulated fishing (IUU), supply chain analysis, traceability, and other initiatives, including the first-ever fishery improvement project in Japan.

== See also ==
- Sustainable fisheries
- Sustainable seafood
