= Chatfield Farmstead =

- U.S. National Register of Historic Places
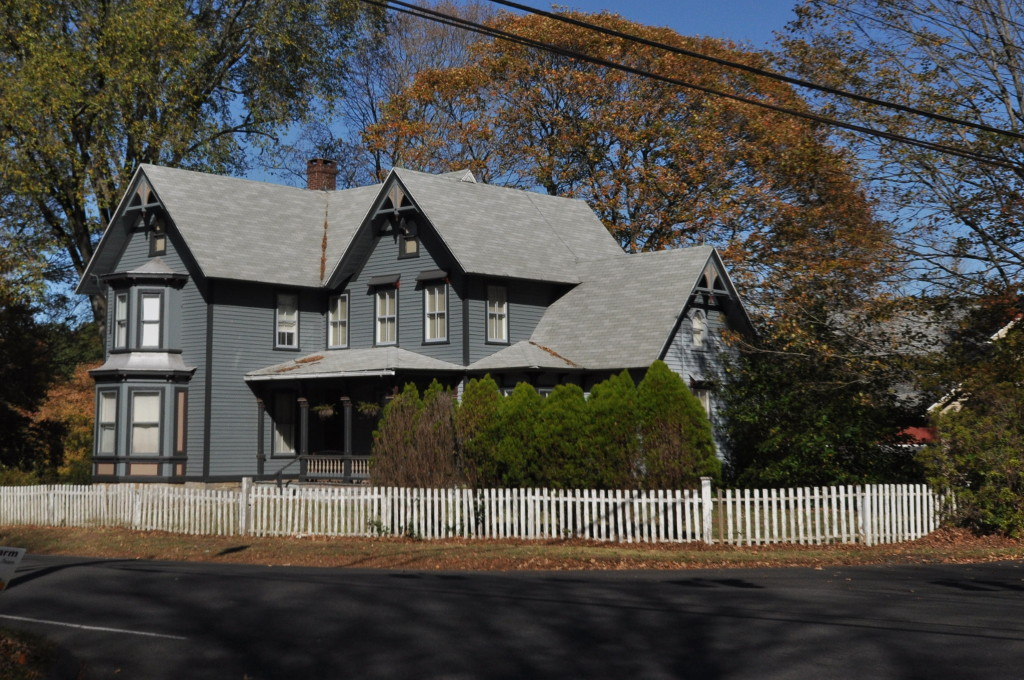
- The farmstead's house

- Location within Connecticut Location within the United States
- Location: 265 Seymour Road, Woodbridge, Connecticut
- Coordinates: 41°23′37″N 73°02′36″W
- Area: 4 acres (1.6 ha)
- Built: 1880
- Architectural style: Gothic Revival, Italianate
- NRHP reference No.: 10000061
- Added to NRHP: March 15, 2010

The Chatfield Farmstead is a historic farmstead at 265 Seymour Road (CT 67) in Woodbridge, Connecticut. Developed in the late 19th century, it includes a particularly well preserved period barn. The property was listed on the National Register of Historic Places in 2010. It is currently operated as the Bladen Valley Farm.

== Description and history ==
The Chatfield Farmstead is located in far northwestern Woodbridge, at the northwest corner of Seymour Road (CT 67) and Bear Hill Road. It is set 4 acres (1.6 ha) of land, surrounded in part by farmlands historically associated with it. The main house, a Gothic Revival frame structure is set near the street corner, and the barn is set just to its north. The house is a rambling structure with multiple roof gables, a projecting window bay with decorative panels, and Stick style applied woodwork in some of the gables. It was built about 1880 for Henry Chatfield, who inherited the land from his father. The farm property was sold out of the Chatfield family in 1923, and the farmstead was subdivided from the bulk of the land in 1976.

The barn is a three-level bank barn, measuring about 65 by 48 feet (20 m × 15 m), with its long axis perpendicular to the road. Although this size is large in comparison to other surviving barns in the area, it is but 1/3 of its greatest size. It was greatly reduced in size in the 1970s, when a portion added in support of a dairy operation was removed.

== See also ==
- National Register of Historic Places listings in New Haven County, Connecticut
