= Thomas Darling =

American businessman (1720–1789)

Thomas Darling (February 21, 1720 – November 30, 1789) was a businessman and elected official in 18th century Connecticut who was acquainted with Benjamin Franklin, Ezra Stiles, Roger Sherman, and Benedict Arnold.

== Life ==
Coat of Arms of Thomas Darling

Darling studied theology at Yale College in New Haven, Connecticut, graduating in 1740. Although he was licensed to preach in 1743, he never sought to become a minister, but trained others for it as the only tutor at Yale from 1743 to 1745. The Yale class of 1746 presented him with a still-surviving silver bowl created by Cornelius Kierstede. The bowl, is said to be the most ornamental piece of plate made in Connecticut up to that time, is owned by Yale University.

On July 25, 1745, in New Haven he married Abigail Noyes (b. March 20, 1724 - d. July 19, 1797), a daughter of the Rev. Joseph Noyes, Darling's mentor. The couple had three sons and five daughters with all but one surviving to adulthood: Abigail, Susanna, Samuel, Thomas, Ann, Dorothy, Joseph and Jemima.

Over the next 31 years in New Haven Darling was an entrepreneur involved in various businesses. He was a manufacturer, merchant, and justice of the peace. Darling ran a rope walk, helped start the first printing business in New Haven, tried to establish a glass business, and was a member of the General Assembly. He was an advocate of religious freedom, and a supporter of the U. S.Constitution.

In 1774 Darling moved to Amity Parish, now Woodbridge, Connecticut, and built a house. The Darling House Museum is now operated by the Amity & Woodbridge Historical Society.

He died in 1789 in Stonington and was buried in New Haven.
