= Darling House Museum =

Historic house in Connecticut, United States

- Thomas Darling House and Tavern
- U.S. National Register of Historic Places
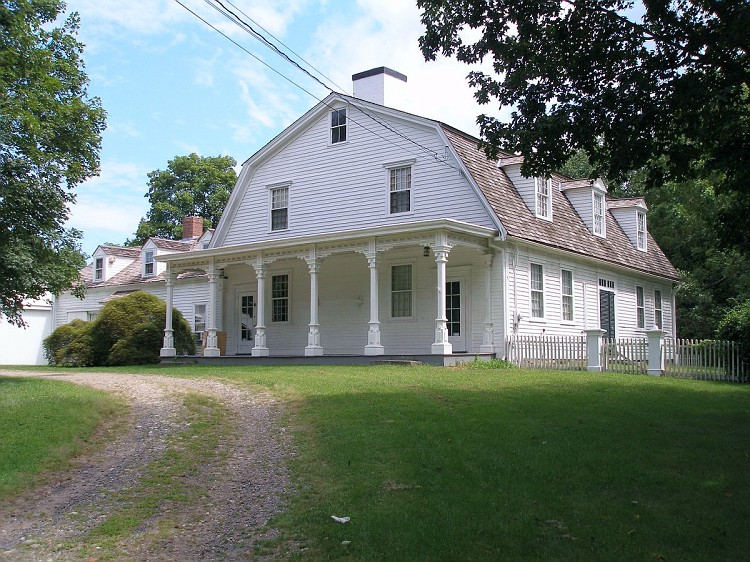

- Location within Connecticut Location within the United States
- Location: 1907 Litchfield Turnpike, Woodbridge, Connecticut
- Coordinates: 41°21′41″N 72°58′59″W
- Built: 1774
- Architect: Abiel Gray
- Architectural style: Georgian
- NRHP reference No.: 79002639
- Added to NRHP: January 17, 1979

The Darling House Museum is a historic house museum at 1907 Litchfield Turnpike CT 69 in Woodbridge, Connecticut, and is owned and operated by the Amity & Woodbridge Historical Society. The house is open by appointment and during special events.

In the early 1770s, Thomas Darling hired Abiel Gray of West Hartford, Connecticut, to build a new home in Amity Parish, outside of New Haven. Gray took two years (1772–1774) to finish the project. The house has a gambrel roof, is built on a central hall plan and has some unusual features. Paneling and woodwork in the hallway and front rooms are richly detailed under 9-foot, 3-inch ceilings. The influence of 18th-century New York is suggested by the imported tiles of Biblical scenes over one fireplace.

Much of the furniture and many items in the home were owned by the Darling family, which owned the house and surrounding land until 1973, when the property was sold to the town of Woodbridge and the Amity & Woodbridge Historical Society began caring for the structure. The property includes a large 18th-century barn, a 19th-century horse barn, a carriage shed, a chicken coop, a pig house, and a 19th-century privy.

The town maintains several fields near the house, and some easy walking trails skirt the base of West Rock.

The Society has a large collection of farm implements on display in the horse barn. Quilts, linens, and period clothing are also displayed in the house.

== See also ==
- National Register of Historic Places listings in New Haven County, Connecticut
