= African Rainforest Conservancy =

The African Rainforest Conservancy (ARC) works to conserve and restore African rainforests, particularly focusing on the Eastern Arc mountains of Tanzania located about 200 kilometres (120 mi) southeast of Mount Kilimanjaro. These lush mountains are among the oldest and most biodiverse in the world. The forests themselves are in jeopardy from local logging, used mostly in the surrounding villages for fuel. In addition, poaching activities endanger several rare species. ARC works to protect these mountains by training the community to be caretakers of the forest, developing the many sustainable business opportunities that exist in the region. Concurrently large scale train planting projects work both to reforest denuded native trees and create timber plantations in non-rainforest areas that can be managed sustainably for generations to come.

== Biodiversity ==
Despite the fact that 70% of the original rainforest cover has gone, the Eastern Arc mountains hold thousands of species that have not yet been named as well as the highest density of endangered animals anywhere in the world. These findings were presented by a group of scientists in the Journal of Biological Conservation.
