= Marc Ona =

Marc Ona Essangui
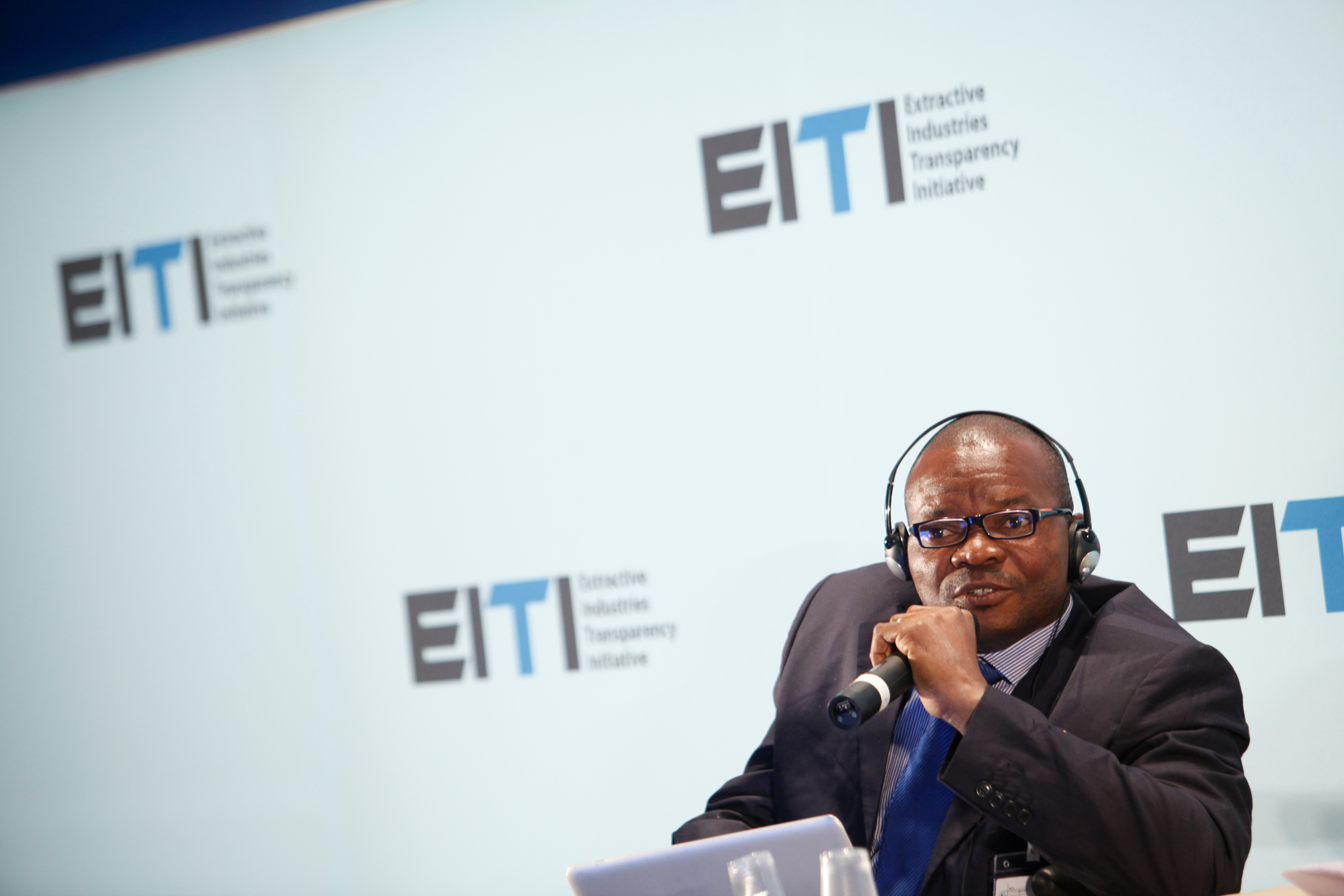
- Notable work: Since January 2020, Marc Ona Essangui is the president of Tournons La Page movement for democracy in Africa.

Marc Ona Essangui is founder of the environmental NGO Brainforest and president of Environment Gabon, a network of NGOs. Marc Ona Essangui led efforts to expose agreements behind a Chinese mining project in Gabon, a country in West Central Africa, that threatened equatorial rainforest ecosystems.

According to Ona Essangui, the proposed Belinga development, a $3.5 billion project, was secretly negotiated. Local communities were not consulted and are unaware of the effect that the project would have on their environment. Ona won the 2009 Africa Goldman Environmental Prize for his work. The project is currently on hold due to a lack of financing. In March 2013, Ona Essangui was sentenced to a six-month suspended prison sentence and an approximately $10,000 USD fine for defamation of Liban Soleman, senior advisor to President Ali Bongo Ondimba.

From January 2020 to July 2023, Marc Ona Essangui was the president of Tournons La Page movement for democracy in Africa.
