= The Water Club (restaurant) =

Defunct restaurant and event venue in New York City

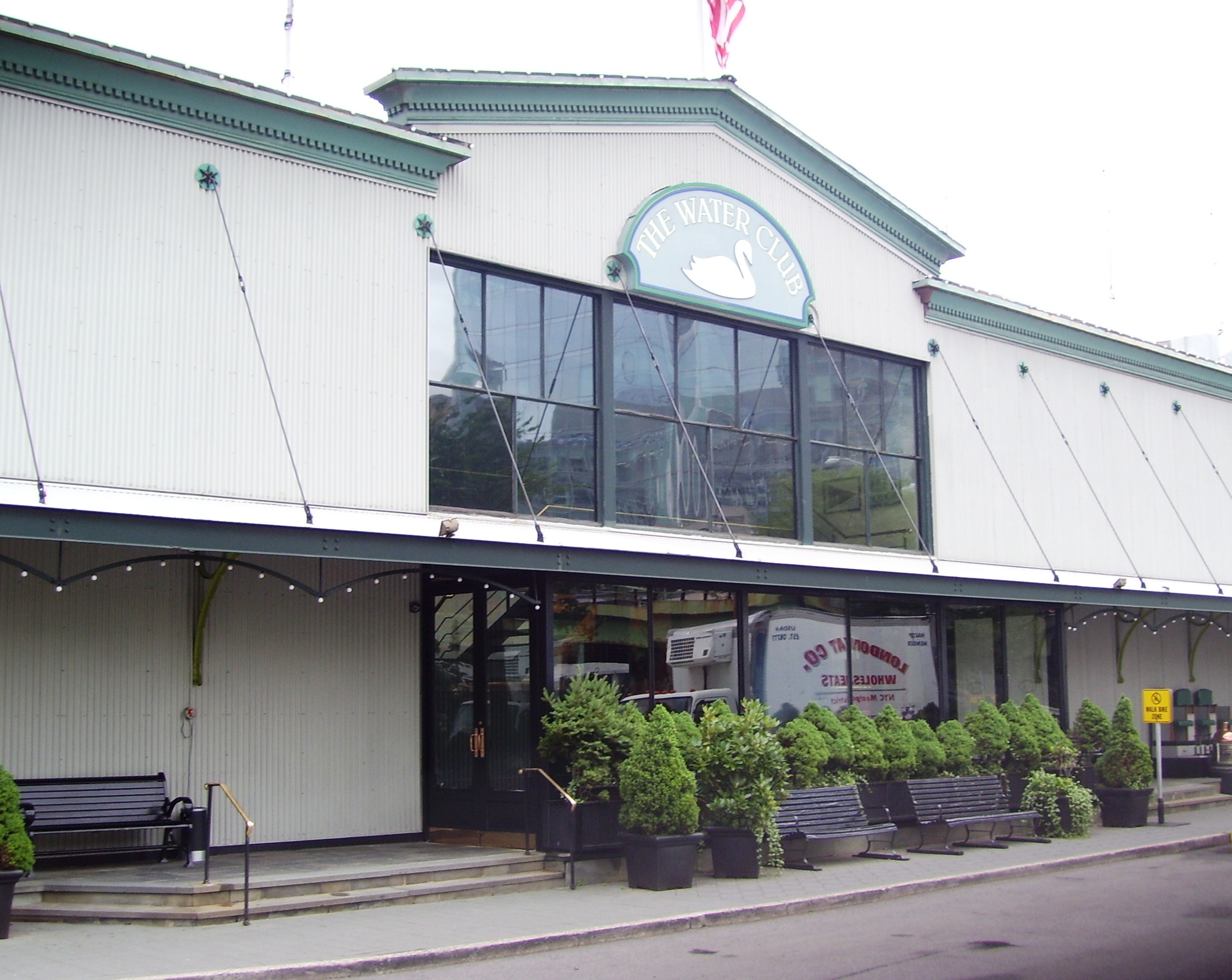
- The restaurant's exterior in 2010
- Interactive map of The Water Club

Restaurant information
- Established: 1982
- Closed: 2024
- Food type: American (traditional) cuisine and seafood
- Location: 500 East 30th Street, New York, New York, 10016, United States
- Coordinates: 40°44′25″N 73°58′21″W

The Water Club was a restaurant and event venue on two barges moored on the East River at East 30th Street in Kips Bay, in Manhattan, New York City. Located on the stretch of waterfront between the East 34th Street Heliport and Waterside Plaza, the venue served classic American cuisine and seafood; it overlooked Long Island City, Queens and Greenpoint, Brooklyn across the river. In the mid-1980s, The Water Club was the tenth largest grossing restaurant in the United States.

== History ==
=== Development and opening ===
The establishment of the venue—the first waterfront restaurant in Manhattan—traces back to a request for proposals for waterfront development issued by New York City in 1978 for a restaurant and a public promenade on the site, which was previously occupied by two parking lots. The following year, MDO Development Corporation signed a 25-year lease agreement with the city to construct and operate the restaurant. The venue was developed by Michael D. (Buzzy) O'Keeffe, who owned The River Café in Brooklyn and had prior experience with the challenges associated with opening a waterfront restaurant in New York City.

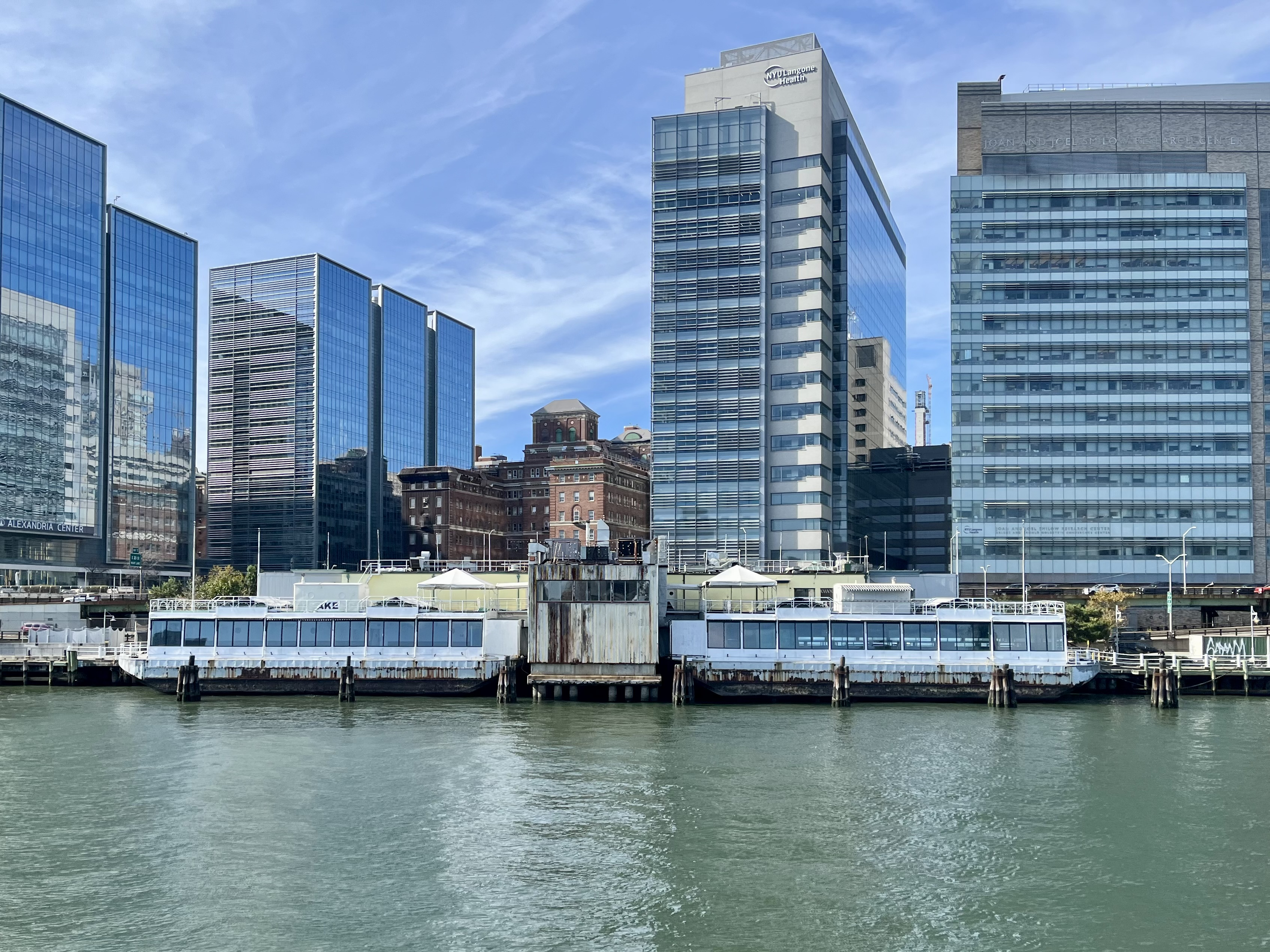
The venue consisted of two barges moored in the East River.

Built at a cost of $5.2 million, the venue consisted of two 110-foot-long (34 m) former lumber barges moored in the East River and was connected by ramps to a structure on land that contained the kitchen, a bar and lounge, and a two-story glass lobby with a staircase leading to an outdoor bar on the rooftop. The restaurant included a parking lot with valet parking on the bulkhead to the north of the venue, along a waterfront promenade with landscaping and benches designed by M. Paul Friedberg. The promenade was developed as a required public amenity and forms a section of the East River Greenway. The south barge (used for private parties) first opened on September 9, 1982, and was followed by the restaurant in the north barge, which opened a few weeks later on September 28.

The following summer, O'Keeffe decided to expand the venue, adding a third 140-foot-long (43 m) barge filled with 200 tons of sand that functioned as an artificial beach for the use of restaurant patrons that had lounge chairs, umbrellas and a bar. Although he had envisioned the beach barge to be open each summer and towed away for winter storage, the beach only lasted for one week because O'Keeffe had failed to apply for a permit to dock the barge, which was ordered to be towed away by the city's Department of Ports and Terminals, which leased the property to the restaurant.

=== Operation ===
Just a few months after the restaurant opened, The Water Club made headlines when it refused to serve Mimi Sheraton, the food critic for The New York Times. Sheraton had eaten at the restaurant unnoticed the first time she dined at the venue, but was recognized when she returned for dinner with four guests on December 30, 1982. It was the first time she had been refused service by a restaurant. In a news conference that followed the incident, O'Keeffe explained that he decided to exclude the food critic because he thought her reviews were inaccurate and was particularly unhappy about the one-star rating that she gave his River Café in Brooklyn. In 1988, O'Keeffe hired Richard Moonen to serve as the restaurant's head chef, where he remained until 1994.

The Water Club was located in a prime viewing spot for the Macy's 4th of July Fireworks usually held over the East River; the venue had been used during the event as a command center for the fireworks show, a filming location for its broadcast on television, and private receptions for Macy's guests. The waterfront promenade built as part of the restaurant included 396 feet (121 m) of docking space that was used by private yachts, including vessels owned by Malcolm Forbes and Donald Trump for viewing the fireworks display on the 4th of July.

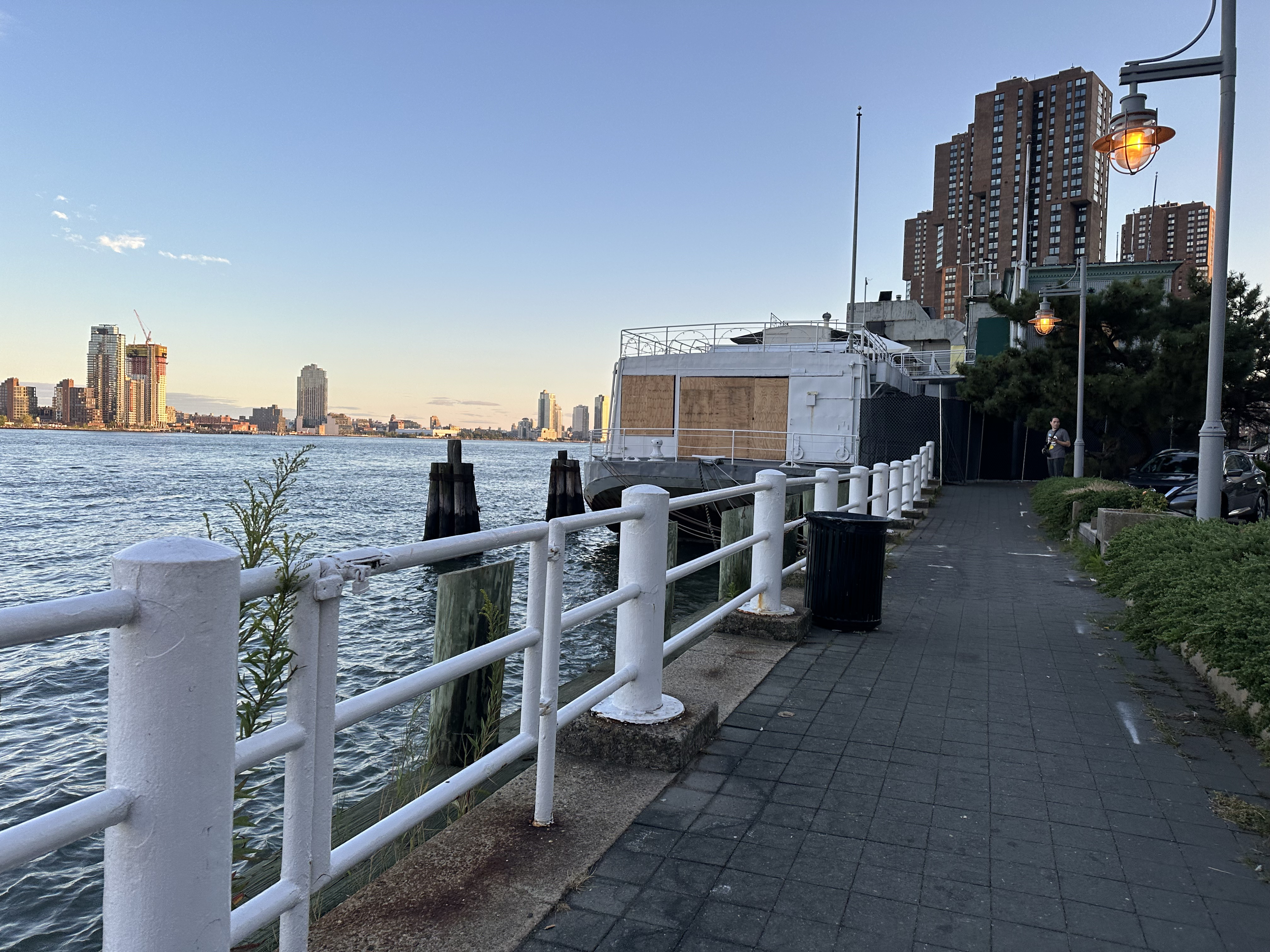
The Water Club, now closed, viewed from the north in September 2024

In 2001, the restaurant's original lease agreement with the city was amended and the term was extended through 2030. The agreement was made through the city's Department of Small Business Services and administered by the Economic Development Corporation. In 2011, the New York City Comptroller issued a report alleging that The Water Club was understating its revenue by failing to record some cash sales; the property was leased from the city and a portion of the rent was determined by the amount of revenue. The restaurant had been previously accused of inaccurate record-keeping when its former manager was found guilty of embezzling $485,000 when he worked at The Water Club from 1983 to 1986; at that time it was the tenth largest grossing restaurant in the country.

Like its sister restaurant The River Café, The Water Club was heavily damaged by Hurricane Sandy in October 2012, forcing its temporary closure for repairs. The venue's event space reopened in May 2013, followed by the rooftop bar over the summer and the restaurant in October 2013.

The restaurant was later converted into a venue for private events. In 2021, O'Keeffe proposed adding a 24,000-square-foot (2,200 m^{2}) high-end casino next to the venue, which drew opposition from some of the local residents. Subsequent to what was originally announced as renovations, The Water Club closed permanently in 2024 when the remaining time on the venue's lease was turned back over to the city.
