= Seafood Watch =

Consumer advisory list

Monterey Bay Aquarium Seafood Watch
- Formation: 1999; 27 years ago
- Type: 501(c)(3) Nonprofit
- Purpose: Sustainable seafood
- Location: Monterey, California, United States
- Parent organization: Monterey Bay Aquarium
- Website: www.seafoodwatch.org

Seafood Watch is a sustainable seafood advisory list, and has influenced similar programs around the world. It is best known for developing science-based seafood recommendations that consumers, chefs, and business professionals use to inform their seafood purchasing decisions.

Seafood Watch is a program of the Monterey Bay Aquarium. It has roots in the Monterey Bay Aquarium's Fishing for Solutions exhibit, which ran from 1997 to 1999 and produced a menu of sustainable seafood options in their cafeteria. It was one of the first resources for sustainable seafood information together with the Audubon Society's What is a fish lover to eat? which also came out in the late 1990s. Due to its popularity, the official public outreach campaign launched in October 1999.

Seafood Watch assesses impacts on marine and freshwater ecosystems of fisheries (wild-caught) and aquaculture (farming) operations. Fishing gear and farming methods are also taken into consideration. The assessments and calculations result in an overall scoring and final rating known as a Seafood Watch Recommendation.

== Sustainable seafood list ==
A Seafood Watch pamphlet showcasing sustainable seafood categories and options.

The organization's recommendations focus on the North American market, suggesting what seafood is a green "Best Choice", blue "Certified", yellow "Good Alternative", or a red "Avoid".

The "Best Choice" category is for seafood that is caught responsibly and well managed. The "Certified" category also marks responsibly caught seafood, however it is more specific to and aligns with the Certification definition provided by the United Nations’ Food and Agriculture Organization (FAO). The yellow "Good alternative" labels seafood that is decent, but still poses concerns about fishing farming and management tactics. The "Avoid" category is for seafood which is overfished or fished or farmed in ways that harm other marine life or the environment. Health alerts for fish with high levels of contaminants (e.g. mercury, dioxins, PCBs) are also noted, although they may appear in any category.

The Seafood Watch website includes regional, country-wide, and sushi guides for the United States. Pocket guides are available from the aquarium and further information is on the web site. Several of the regional guides are also available in Spanish. The guides are updated twice annually, while the website is updated more often. Restaurants and retailers are also targeted with an educational program developed by Seafood Watch.

In 2010 Seafood Watch added its "Super Green" list, which features seafood that it is good for human health and does not harm the oceans. The Super Green list highlights products that are currently on the Seafood Watch "Best Choices" (green) list, are low in environmental contaminants, and are good sources of long-chain omega-3 fatty acids.

== Projects and collaborators ==
Producers are encouraged to improve their fishing or farming habits through technical assistance, policy management, and even assurance in the sustainable seafood industry. Seafood Watch aims to target all levels of the seafood supply chain in their quest for sustainability.

Seafood Watch partners with zoos, aquariums, science museums, nature centers, and other non-profits to promote sustainable seafood. Its business and culinary initiatives assist seafood buyers, distributors, retailers, food service professionals, and chefs in moving the marketplace towards environmentally responsible fisheries and aquaculture operations. The Monterey Bay Aquarium's Ocean Conservation Policy team works to advance policies and management measures to improve traceability in the global seafood supply chain; eliminate illegal, unreported and unregulated fishing; strengthen and advocate for fisheries management; and restore shark and bluefin tuna populations.

== Industry criticism ==
Industry organizations have pushed back against Seafood Watch's efforts. After publication of a sustainable sushi guide, the National Fisheries Institute, an industry trade group for seafood, wrote on its blog that the guides were "confusing and contradictory", adding that they did not fully take into account the economic, environmental and social aspects of seafood sustainability.

== See also ==
- Conservation status
- Overfishing
- Sustainable seafood advisory lists and certification
- Seafood Choices Alliance
- Mercury in fish
