= Sustainable seafood =

Seafood caught or farmed considering the long-term vitality of species

Sustainable seafood is seafood that is caught or farmed in ways that consider the long-term vitality of harvested species and the well-being of the oceans, as well as the livelihoods of fisheries-dependent communities. It was first promoted through the sustainable seafood movement, which began in the 1990s. This movement highlights the problems of overfishing and environmentally destructive fishing methods. Through a number of initiatives, the movement has increased public awareness and raised concerns over the way seafood is obtained.

Sustainable seafood is from either fished or farmed sources that can maintain or increase production in the future without jeopardizing the ecosystems from which it was acquired. The sustainable seafood movement has gained momentum as more people become aware of both overfishing and environmentally destructive fishing methods. Fish farming can also have negative environmental effects, such as the destruction of natural wetlands and marine pollution.

== Importance ==
Global total wild fish capture and aquaculture production in million tonnes, as reported by the FAO

Marine environments are currently under immense pressure. Their problems primarily arise through anthropogenic causes, such as overfishing and environmental destruction. However, research to date suggests that fisheries are able to recover or stabilize their populations when responsible management and regulations are in place. This perspective may be challenged in future due to the impact of increasing acidification of the oceans, due to climate change and CO2 pollution.

Unfortunately, most seafood is obtained through "irresponsible fishing practices that continue to modify some marine ecosystem." This has resulted in record levels of depleted stocks. According to the Food and Agriculture Organization's report in 2026 on world fisheries, 37.6% of studied fish stocks are overfished. However, 72.6% of fish caught in 2023 came from sustainable fish stocks, showing the good management of large fisheries. Considering the rising global population and the pressure that it has, and will continue to exert on the Earth's resources, a more sustainable method of fishing is necessary if humans wish to utilize its natural abundance.

== Sustainable Seafood Movement ==
The Sustainable Seafood Movement is an initiative born through the realization that the marine ecosystems of the world were being overexploited and destroyed. It began in the 1990s and was driven by social marketing through Ecolabel and awareness campaigns. Through social marketing, the collaboration between environmental non-governmental organizations (NGOs) and industry allowed for consumers to make informed choices, potentially contributing to the conservation of marine biodiversity.

=== Ecolabeling ===
Ecolabeling programs evaluate the production process with environmental standards set by an independent third party. Should the process fulfill the specific requirements, the producer or marketer may purchase a license to use an ecolabel in its marketing. This label allows the consumer to know that the product was produced sustainably. Labeling is not only an effective regulatory tool in encouraging consumers to make environmentally friendly choices, but it also provides a financial benefit to producers.

In 1996 the Marine Stewardship Council (MSC) implemented the first certification program. Since then, they have not only made a distinct effort to maintain the health of ecosystems, but they have also contributed to more financial success for producers. For instance, once the American Albacore Fishing Association had its tuna certified to the MSC standard, they were able to obtain premium prices for their product. For the small fishing community in Bonita, California, certification allowed them to sell direct, as opposed to depending on the instability on the dock. They were able to make a profit of $2,260 rather than $1,700 per ton. More companies and organizations are choosing to use environmentally sustainable production, such as ecolabeling, to gain a greater market share and higher profits.

Additionally, some researchers have raised concerns that seafood labels might be contributing to greenwashing. Greenwashing is the practice of making misleading claims about a product's environmental benefits. A 2025 review revealed that unregulated and misleading ecolabels are frequent in supermarkets, and many consumers struggle to understand what ecolabels truly mean. The authors mentioned that major labels do not provide accessible details about how products are certified and the lack of a consistent regulatory framework. Researchers suggest using life cycle assessment, to measure a product's environmental impact across the entirety of its life cycle, could make ecolabels more reliable and reduce the risk of greenwashing.

=== Awareness Campaigns ===
Awareness campaigns focus on educating the public and encouraging them to purchase products that consider the vitality of marine species. They do so through boycotts of certain species and products as well as through seafood guides. Seafood guides highlight which species are acceptable to consume and which are not based on their environmental impact. Guides are typically divided into three categories, some using the analogy of a traffic light's colours: red, yellow, and green. These rankings are based on how the fish responds to fishing pressure, abundance, gear impact, bycatch, and management. Red represents items to avoid, yellow is a good alternative, and green is the best choice. Several organizations, including the Monterey Bay Aquarium, have developed their own guides or wallet cards to be distributed to the public.

In September 2016, a partnership of Google, Oceana, and SkyTruth introduced Global Fishing Watch, a website designed to help the public in monitoring fishing activities.

=== Sustainable Seafood in Africa ===
In 2004, the South African Sustainable Seafood Initiative (SASSI) was established as an initiative of the World Wide Fund for Nature (WWF). The main goal was to inform the supply chain about sustainable seafood. In 2018, the four-year project Fish for Good started to guide fisheries in South Africa towards more sustainable fishing practices. In Western Cape, fishing subsidies have historically favoured large-scale commercial fishers over small-scale fishers. The government has to look at how to help small-scale and commercial fisheries to avoid overfishing and illegal activities at sea.

=== Methods ===
Spearfishing

Spearfishing is an ancient method of fishing that involves using a spear to catch fish underwater. Unlike some modern fishing techniques that can be harmful to marine ecosystems, spearfishing can be practiced in a sustainable manner when done responsibly. The Tagbanua people use spearfishing along with seasonal fishing to ensure their fisheries are sustainable.

==== Turtle Exclusion Devices ====
Sustainable fishing methods are focused on minimizing environmental effects. As a result, gear can be modified, such as turtle exclusion devices. In catfish surveys in Missouri, USA, turtle bycatch has been shown to be a large issue. With modifications to the devices used to capture catfish, there was an 84% decrease in turtle bycatch, with no decrease in catfish capture rates. Marine fisheries have found similar results. A small fishery on the coast of Indonesia added lights to nets, reducing turtle bycatch by 61.4% for all species. Additionally, bycatch for green sea turtles decreased by 59.9%, while catch rates for the target species stayed nearly the same.

==== Seasonal Fishing Practices ====
Seasonal fishing can play a crucial role in promoting the sustainability of fisheries by allowing fish populations to reproduce and replenish. By implementing seasonal fishing restrictions, fisheries management can ensure that fishing activities are carried out when fish are most abundant and actively spawning, thus reducing the risk of overfishing. Additionally, seasonal fishing can help protect vulnerable life stages of fish and avoid harming spawning habitats. Seasonal fishing practices can contribute to the long-term health of fisheries and support ecosystem resilience.

==== Marine Protected Areas (MPAs) ====
Marine Protected Areas (MPAs) are areas where fishing is prohibited and offer a chance to enhance biodiversity conservation. Over the past 20 years, the world has increased the global MPA area from about 5 million square kilometers to about 28 million square kilometers. Out of all sustainable fishing practices, MPAs have the most potential for positive ecological effects, showing significant increases in fish biomass.

Management Under Climate Change

Some researchers have argued that sustainable fishing not only depends on the quantity of fish caught and brought back in, but also on climate resilience, equity, and governance. Climate change makes fishery management more difficult because changing ocean conditions can affect the reproduction of fish populations. A 2024 study of cod in the North Sea under 40,000 future scenarios with varying, climate conditions, reproduction rates, and fishing levels, showed that no management strategy performed well in every single scenario. As a result, the authors recommend a risk-based approach that balances protecting fish populations and maintaining profitable fisheries.

== Seafood Guide ==
The Seafood Guide below, made by SeaChoice, highlights which species are best to eat, and which should be avoided based on their management, abundance, and whether they have been caught or farmed in environmentally sustainable ways. It allows consumers to be informed of their choices and vote with their wallets.

| Fish | Best Choice | Some Concerns | Avoid |
|---|---|---|---|
| Arctic Char | Farmed | | |
| Barramundi | Farmed, Closed System (US), Australis Net Pens (Vietnam) | Farmed, Closed System (Australia) | Farmed, Open System (Most) |
| Basa/Pangasius | | (Vietnam/Cambodia) | |
| Catfish | Farmed (US) | | |
| Chilean Seabass | Chile, Heard and McDonald Islands, Falkland Islands, Macquarie Island | South Georgia, Kerguelen Islands, Ross Sea | Crozet Islands, Prince Edward and Marion Islands |
| Clams/Mussels | Farmed (All) | Wild | Arctic Surf (Canada) |
| Cod | Pacific Longline (Alaska) | Pacific Bottom Trawl (US/BC) | Atlantic (Canada), Pacific (Russia/Japan) |
| Crab | Dungeness (BC/Washington), Stone (Florida/US Atlantic) | King (US), Snow (US/Canada), Jonah (US/Canada), Atlantic Blue (US) | King (Russia) |
| Flounder/Sole | | (Pacific) | (Atlantic) |
| Haddock | Handline (US Atlantic) | Bottom Longline (Canada), Bottom Trawl (US/Canada/Iceland) | |
| Halibut | (Alaska) | (BC) | (Atlantic) |
| Lingcod | | (Canada/US) | |
| Lobster | Spiny (US/Baja Mexico) | American (Canada/US), Spiny (Bahamas) | Spiny (Brazil) |
| Mackerel | King (US), Spanish (US), Atlantic (Canada) | Atlantic Mid-Water Trawl (US) | |
| Mahi Mahi | Troll/Pole (US Atlantic) | Longline and other (US) | Longline (Imported) |
| Oysters | Farmed | Wild (Canada/US) | |
| Pollock | | Atlantic, Pacific (Alaska) | |
| Rockfish/Pacific Snapper | Black rockfish (CA/OR/WA. US) | Hook-and-line, jig (Pacific) | Bottom Trawl (Pacific) |
| Sablefish | (Alaska/Canada) | (US West Coast) | |
| Salmon | Wild (Alaska), Coho Land Farmed (US) | Wild (BC, Washington, Oregon) | Atlantic Open net pen Farmed (All Regions) |
| Sardines | Pacific (Canada/US) | | Atlantic (Mediterranean) |
| Scallops | Farmed Off Bottom | Farmed Dredge, Wild (US/Canada Atlantic) | |
| Shark/skate | | Dogfish, spiny (Canada, Pacific) | (All) |
| Shrimp/Prawns | Pink (Oregon), Spot (BC), Farmed Closed System (US), Northern (Canada Atlantic-trap) | All Other (Canada/US) | All Other Farmed |
| Squid | Longfin (US) | (All Other) | |
| Swordfish | Harpoon (Canada/Hawaii) | Longline (US) | (International), Longline (Canada) |
| Tilapia | Farmed (US) | Farmed (South America) | Farmed (Asia) |
| Trout, Rainbow | Farmed (US), Land Based Farmed (Canada) | Farmed Open Net (Canada) | |
| Tuna, Albacore | (Canada/US Pacific) | Longline (Hawaii) | Longline (International) |
| Tuna, Bigeye (Ahi) | Pole/Troll (US Atlantic) | Pole/Troll (International), Longline (US Atlantic) | Longline (International/Hawaii) |
| Tuna, Bluefin | | | (All) |
| Tuna, Canned | Albacore Chunk White (Canada/US Pacific) | Albacore Chunk White Pole/Troll (International) | Chunk light/white (All exc. Pole/Troll) |
| Tuna, Skipjack | Pole/Troll (Atlantic) | Longline (US Atlantic/Hawaii) | Purse Seine/Longline (International) |
| Tuna, Yellowfin (Ahi) | Pole/Troll (US) | Pole/Troll (International), Longline (US Atlantic/Hawaii) | Purse Seine/Longline (International) |

== Fishing Methods ==
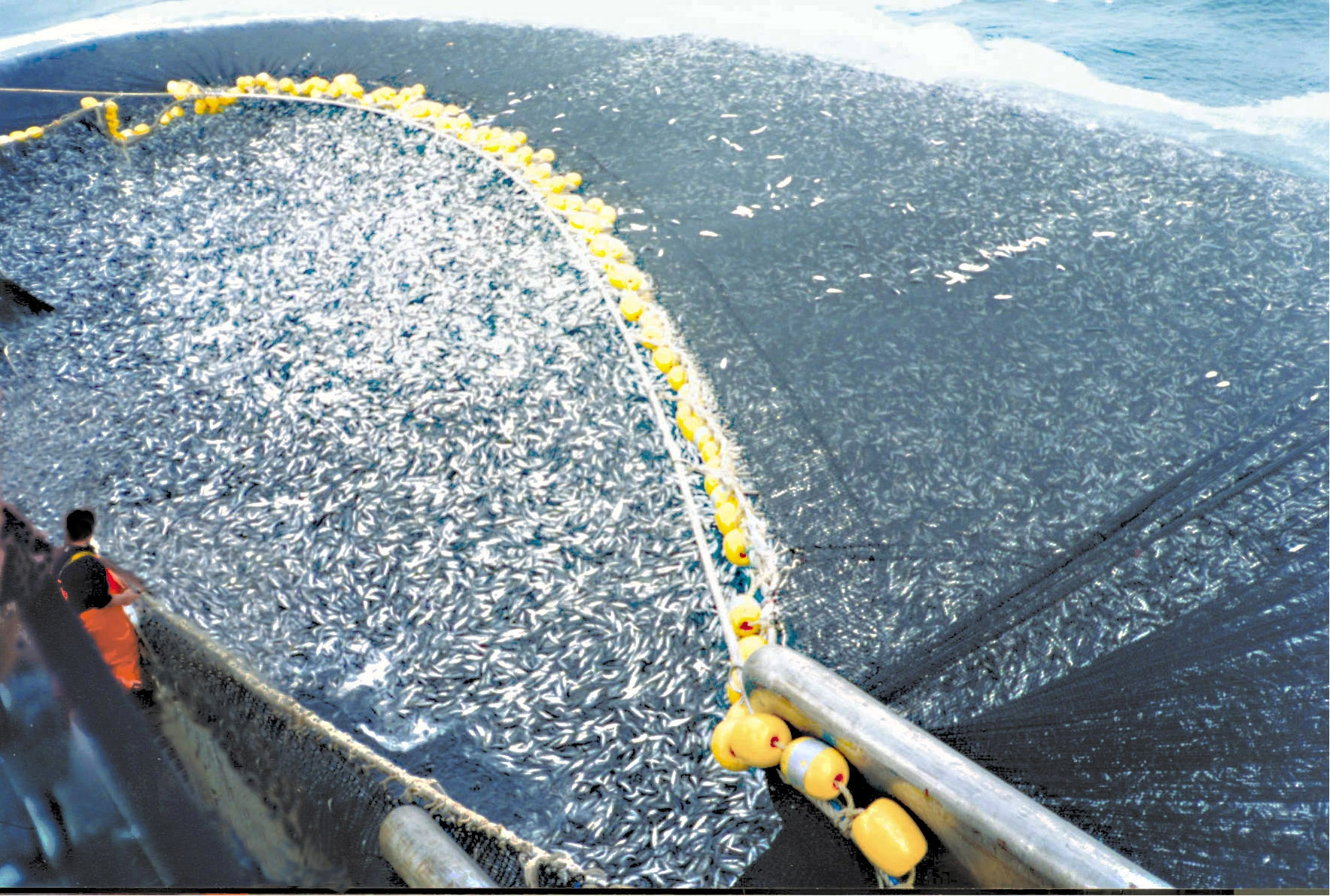
Chilean purse seine

Historically, advances in fishing technology have focused on increasing catch efficiency. In the 19th and 20th centuries, new innovations such as steam engines, synthetic nets, and on-board refrigeration led to larger vessels and fishing gear. These advancements contributed to overfishing. Recent fishing technology has prioritized reducing bycatch and limiting environmental harm. These innovations have been driven by regulatory requirements and consumer demand for sustainable seafood. Recent research suggests that fishing gear can be used sustainably through technological improvements and good management.

There are a wide variety of fishing methods. Each has its own environment impact that varies in intensity. The table below highlights a fishing method along with its environmental repercussions.

| Method | Equipment used | Type of fish | Environmental Impact |
|---|---|---|---|
| Pole/troll | Fishing rod/pole and bait | Open ocean swimmers to bottom dwellers | Low environmental impact. Reduced chance of bycatch |
| Purse seining | A large net is used to surround fish. The bottom of the net is pulled close to push the fish to the middle | Schooling fish | Higher chance of bycatch |
| Gillnetting | Uses a system of nets with floats and weights. The nets are anchored to the sea floor and allowed to float at the surface | Sardines, salmon, cod | Animals cannot see the net; therefore, they swim into it and are tangled. Huge risk of bycatch. |
| Longline fishing | Fishing line cast out from the boat. Can range from one mile to 50 miles. | Pelagic fish | Higher risk of bycatch. Fishermen use weights to sink their lines, which reduce the risk of bycatch. |
| Traps and pots | Wire or wooden cages attached to the sea floor; fishing weirs | Lobsters, crab, shrimp | The traps keep the fish alive. Lower chance of bycatch. |
| Trolling | Line towed behind the boat | Salmon, mahi-mahi, tuna | Release bycatch |
| Harpooning | Harpoon | Large pelagic fish | Fisherman have to visualize prey. No chance of bycatch. |
| Trawls and dredges | Use huge nets that can either drag on the bottom of the sea floor or in midwater. | Pollock, cod, flounder, shrimp | Large amounts of bycatch. Can damage the sea floor. |

== National Oceanic and Atmospheric Administration (NOAA) ==
The National Oceanic and Atmospheric Administration (NOAA) is a national government agency that has authority over conservation, marine fisheries, and management. The NOAA has created FishWatch to help guide concerned consumers to sustainable seafood choices. The fisheries in the United States are overseen by the Ten National Standards of the Magnuson–Stevens Fishery Conservation and Management Act. Therefore, these standards are intended to protect fish populations and prevent overfishing. Along with the Magnuson-Stevens Act, U.S. fisheries are also regulated under the Endangered Species Act and Marine Mammal Protection Act.

The NOAA Fisheries has started using aquaculture to produce sustainable seafood. Aquaculture is fish or shellfish farming. The aquaculture fisheries hatch and raise the fish until market size. By using aquaculture the wild fish will be able to repopulate without the threat of overfishing. The aquaculture fish have a variety of uses including food, nutritional, and pharmaceutical. Two types of aquacultures exist. Marine aquaculture farms the fish species that live in the ocean and freshwater aquaculture farms species that live in freshwater. NOAA is focusing on an alternative seafood source to help repopulate and save the ocean's ecosystems.

== Sustainable Seafood Organisations ==
=== Aquaculture Stewardship Council ===
The Aquaculture Stewardship Council (ASC) is an independent non-profit organization and labelling organization that establishes protocol on farmed seafood while ensuring sustainable aquaculture. The ASC provides producers with a certification of environmental sustainability and social responsibility. The Aquaculture Stewardship Council was founded in 2009 by the World Wide Fund for Nature (WWF) and the Dutch Sustainable Trade Initiative (IDH).

=== Marine Stewardship Council (MSC) ===
The Marine Stewardship Council is a global non-profit organization looking to conserve the oceans. Their mission is to use a combination of certified fisheries and ecolabeling to make people aware of how important it is to preserve our oceans. The MSC works with fisheries, scientists, seafood companies, conservation groups and the public to encourage environmentally friendly seafood choices. The two main ways the MSC regulates sustainable seafood are by setting standards for certified fisheries and ecolabeling.

The certified fisheries are judged on the three standards the MSC provides. The MSC, however, does not certify the fisheries. They are certified by a third party system to remove any bias. The standards were created to decrease overfishing and maintain healthy ecosystems. The three standards are:

- Maintaining Sustainable Fish Stocks

- The fishery may not overexploit any of its resources.

- Environmental Impact

- Each fishery is judged on the amount of environmental impact they contribute to the ocean. The fishery may not use any form of fishing that destroys the structure, productivity, function, or diversity of the ecosystem.

- Effective Management

- Not only does the fishery have to follow the two other MSC standards, but they also have to follow all local, national, and international laws.

The MSC ecolabel

Once a fishery has been reviewed and certified, their certification lasts for five years. In that five years, the fishery will be inspected and held to the environmental standards of the MSC. After the five years have passed, the fishery will have to go through the approval process again.

The second way the MSC regulates seafood to the public is by using their ecolabel. The ecolabel on seafood products guarantees the seafood has come from a sustainable source and certified fishery. The ecolabel can be found around the world.

Before a seafood product can carry the MSC eco-label, the fishery must acquire the MSC Fisheries certification. Additionally, all companies in the supply chain that take ownership of the product including distributors, wholesalers, manufacturers, pack houses, traders, retailers, catering organizations and restaurants must acquire the MSC Chain of Custody Certification.

==== Criticism of the Marine Stewardship Council ====
Critics condemn the Marine Stewardship Council for certifying specific fisheries that may be in trouble, harmful to the environment, or where there is a lack of information available. For example, the Antarctic toothfish fishery in the Ross Sea was awarded an MSC label, despite a lack of basic information on the stock itself. A Marine Policy study that analyzed the stocks of MSC fisheries found that 31% of the stocks were overfished, and 11% did not have suitable information available.

Richard Page, a Greenpeace oceans campaigner, stated "I will go as far as to say consumers are being duped. They think they are buying fish that are sustainable and can eat them with a clean conscience."

=== Friend of the Sea ===
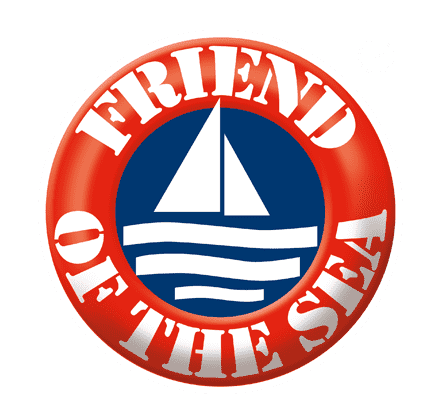
Friend of The Sea - Certified sustainable products and companies contributing to marine conservation

Friend of the Sea is currently a project of the World Sustainability Organization, an international organization with a humanitarian and environmental conservation mission.

It was founded by Dr. Paolo Bay who started the sustainable seafood movement in Europe. The certified fisheries are audited by the International Organization for Standardization. The criteria to become a certified fishery are:

- The fish stock may not be overexploited
- No habitat destruction
- No bycatch of endangered species
- Must follow all laws and regulations
- Reduction of the carbon footprint
- Social accountability

Friend of the Sea also participates in the certification of aquaculture farms. The establishment of aquaculture helps reduce the number of wild species caught. The criteria of aquaculture are:

- There is no environmental impact where the farm is placed
- Must follow all waste water guidelines
- A very low percentage of escapes
- No genetically modified organisms or growth hormones
- Use of antibiotics only if it is necessary
- Reduction of the carbon footprint
- Social accountability

In 2024, farmed aquatic animal production surpassed 100 million metric tons. Meanwhile, wild-caught production remained steady at roughly 92 million metric tons.

== Chefs and restaurants ==
Due to growing public concern about overfishing, many seafood restaurants have begun to offer more sustainable seafood options, with some restaurants specializing in sustainable seafood, exemplified by Miya's, a restaurant headed by chef Bun Lai, the first sushi restaurant to specialize in sustainable seafood and a 2016 White House Champions of Change for Sustainable Seafood recipient. Today, there are sustainable sushi restaurants throughout the U.S., Canada, and England, and many more sustainable seafood restaurants in general. Due to eco-labeling, seafood guides, traceability schemes, sourcing policies, and awareness initiatives there are more chefs and restaurants involved in the sustainable seafood movement than ever before.

The rising "trash fish" trend of expanding the numbers of species of popular seafood consumption, is another way chefs and restaurants are supporting sustainable seafood. NOAA estimates there are around 20,000 species of seafood in the world, and most of them edible. Ten species account for 86% of seafood consumption in the United States. Furthermore, chefs and restaurants following the "trash fish" trend aim to increase the ranges of species people eat. The desired outcome is to decrease overfishing and revitalize populations of the more popular fish, and to redirect the attention of consumers to more sustainable species.

Organizations such as Seafood Choices Alliance have helped educate chefs about the choices they make in order to encourage more chefs and restaurants to offer sustainable options.

== Advisory lists ==
- Sustainable fish by region

== See also ==
- Environmental Defense Fund – US-based nonprofit environmental organization
- Fisheries Law Centre
- List of seafoods
- Marine Stewardship Council – Fishing certifier
- One Fish, Two Fish, Crawfish, Bluefish – 2003 cookbook published by Smithsonian Institution Press (book)
- List of harvested aquatic animals by weight – Aquatic animals that are harvested commercially in the greatest amounts
- Global Sustainable Seafood Initiative – Sustainable seafood organization
- Sea Fish Industry Authority – Public body in the UK
- Seafood Choices Alliance – Defunct program
- Seafood Watch – Consumer advisory list
- Ocean Outcomes – International nonprofit organization
- Overfishing – Removal of any species of fish from water at a rate that the species cannot replenish
- Fisheries management – Regulation of fishing
- Fisheries science – Academic discipline of managing and understanding fisheries
- Fisheries law – Regulations regarding fishing activities
- Illegal, unreported and unregulated fishing
