= Sustainable sushi =

Sushi made from sources that do not jeopardize future availability

Sustainable sushi is sushi made from fished or farmed sources that can be maintained or whose future production does not significantly jeopardize the ecosystems from which it is acquired. Concerns over the sustainability of sushi ingredients arise from greater concerns over environmental, economic and social stability, and human health.

== Origin ==
In 1999, Miya's created the first plant-based sushi menu, in New Haven, Connecticut, as a healthier and more environmentally responsible approach to the cuisine of sushi. By 2004, Miya's had created the first sushi menu that featured sustainable sushi. Miya's is credited as the first sushi restaurant in the world to actively promote sustainable items on its menu. Across the country from Miya's, Bamboo in Portland was the world's first certified sustainable sushi restaurant. Opening in 2008, Bamboo works with independent third party organizations to audit their supply chain for sustainable seafood. Also, opening in 2008 was Tataki in San Francisco, which featured sustainable seafood.

Since then, a growing number of sushi restaurants have adopted sustainability as a guiding principle and have come together to form what they refer to as the "sustainable sushi movement". These individuals espouse the use of only environmentally responsible seafood products as a means of preserving the art of sushi and the health of the world's oceans. Currently, there are upwards of 25 sustainable sushi restaurants in the United States. The gravity of the movement has been acknowledged by many media outlets around the world, including TIME Magazine, which recognized the restaurants Miya's, Bamboo, and Tataki as pioneers in the sushi sustainability.

== Background on environmental sustainability ==
Sustainable sushi raises questions about the sources of the fish used—whether ingredients were caught or raised. It also raises questions about the vulnerability of the species (longevity and reproductive capability) and whether humans are overfishing the stock. Many of the current methods used to fish leads to overfishing and the unintentional killing of fish and other marine life. Industrial pollution from power plants, waste incinerators and mining operations has led to the increasing levels of mercury found in marine life today.

Irresponsible fishing practices if allowed to persist unabated would lead to a seafood species worldwide crash by 2048 (in a worst-case scenario). It is estimated that worldwide, 90% of large predatory fish species are gone. Of the 230 US fisheries assessed, it was determined that 54 stocks are overfished, 45 are currently undergoing overfishing while the status of a bit over half of the US’s stocks are unknown. These problems are largely due to the lack of regulation fishing has had in the past. In the 1960s there was complete access to the fish supply. Marine fisheries were not regulated and largely exploited fishing for economic gain as calls for the expansion of US fishing fleets were met by increased fishing efficiency.

In the 1970s fishing was met with regulation as American fishermen were threatened by the growing presence of global fishing fleets around the US. Congress in 1976 passed the Magnuson-Stevens Fishery Conservation and Management Act, which expanded federal jurisdiction of fisheries to 200 miles offshore when it had previously been 12 miles offshore. This act established American regulation over its fisheries through the creation of eight Regional Fishery Management Councils.

From the 1980s to the present day, laws and regulations on fishing have been much stricter. Today there are restrictions on vessels and gear and on the number of days fishing fleets are allowed to be out at sea. This has created an atmosphere of intense competition between fishermen and regulators, which has translated into "ghost fishing" and increased numbers of "bycatch" or "bykill". For example, when regulators made the fishing season shorter, fishermen responded by increasing the size of their fishing fleets and by using more powerful ships. Incentive structures are set up so that fishermen are compelled to take drastic and irresponsible measures to ensure a catch. In efforts to maximize their earnings with increasing restrictions on fishing, many fishermen put out more hooks, lines and nets. Fouled gear is cut adrift and less selective gear is used and instances of bycatch grow dramatically. Often, fishermen exceed their catch limits and fish populations decrease faster than they can be replenished, which has resulted in crashing fish stock.

An increased demand for sushi made with sustainably fished or raised seafood would decrease the amount of overfishing and bycatch as well as help mitigate all of the negative effects of unsustainable fishing practices. Demanding sustainable sushi is a practical way consumers can contract the market for unsustainably acquired fish while expanding the market for more sustainable seafood.

== Related social issues ==
While some groups advocate for a complete stop to fishing, there are societies and cultures still in existence that rely on fishing for their livelihood. Not only is sea life a large part of their diet but many times fishing is their main source of income as well. As overfishing and unsustainable practices continue, these fishermen will have to go out further and further away from the coastal shelf to find fish to catch. As it becomes more difficult to find fish, it also becomes more expensive to fish commercially. The higher cost of fishing would lead to fewer jobs for fishermen.

== Possible solutions ==
A possible solution to unsustainable fishing practices and decreasing fish stocks, besides responsible fish consumption, are "catch shares". The belief is that aligning conservation and economic incentives through assigning "a share of the catch to an individual fisherman, a group of fishermen or a community which can also be area-based, such as a Territorial Use Right for Fishing, delineating and dedicating a specific area for management by an individual, group or community." The Environmental Defense Fund champions catch shares as a promising solution to reviving fisheries and fishing communities. The EDF believes that catch shares foster better fishing practices, higher prices and less waste. It also changes incentives among fishermen, so that, like stockholders, their desire to see their shares go up lead to their actively protecting their fishery.

The Marine Stewardship Council takes a similar "multi-stakeholder" approach to sustainable fishing. In a 2004 article that appeared in the Corporate Social Responsibility and Environmental Management Journal, author Alexia Cummins describes the success the Marine Stewardship Council has had as a NGO-business partnership. The council established an "eco-labelling programme designed to reward sustainable and well managed fisheries with a visible environmental endorsement."

The MSC as the only international fisheries organization, works to provide a market-based incentives by encouraging consumers to make the best environmental choice in seafood, by setting a standard against which independent accredited certification bodies assess fisheries.

== Advisory lists ==
- Sustainable Sushi

== See also ==
- Environmental Defense Fund
- List of seafoods
- Marine Stewardship Council
- One Fish, Two Fish, Crawfish, Bluefish (book)
- Sea Fish Industry Authority
- Seafood Choices Alliance
- Seafood Watch
- Miya's
