= Miya's =

Coordinates: 41.3098°N 72.9354°W

Miya's Sushi
- Interactive map of Miya's Sushi

Restaurant information
- Established: 1982 (current location: 1990)
- Owner: Yoshiko Lai
- Head chef: Bun Lai
- Food type: Sustainable sushi
- Dress code: Casual
- Location: 68 Howe Street, New Haven, Connecticut, 06511-4622, United States
- Website: http://miyassushi.com

Miya's was a restaurant in New Haven, Connecticut, United States, credited as the first sustainable sushi restaurant in the world. The restaurant was founded by Yoshiko Lai, a Japanese nutritionist. As of 2021, they are permanently closed.

== Cuisine ==
In 1982, Miya's was the first sushi restaurant in Connecticut, specializing in Kyushi-style recipes. With the creation of the sweet potato roll in 1995, Miya's began to create a plant-based sushi menu. By the late 1990s, 80% of the sushi menu had been converted into a plant-based one, and traditional sweetened white rice was replaced with a whole grain brown rice-based blend. In 2005, Miya's introduced its first invasive species menu, featuring locally caught invasive species such as Asian shore crabs and European green crabs.

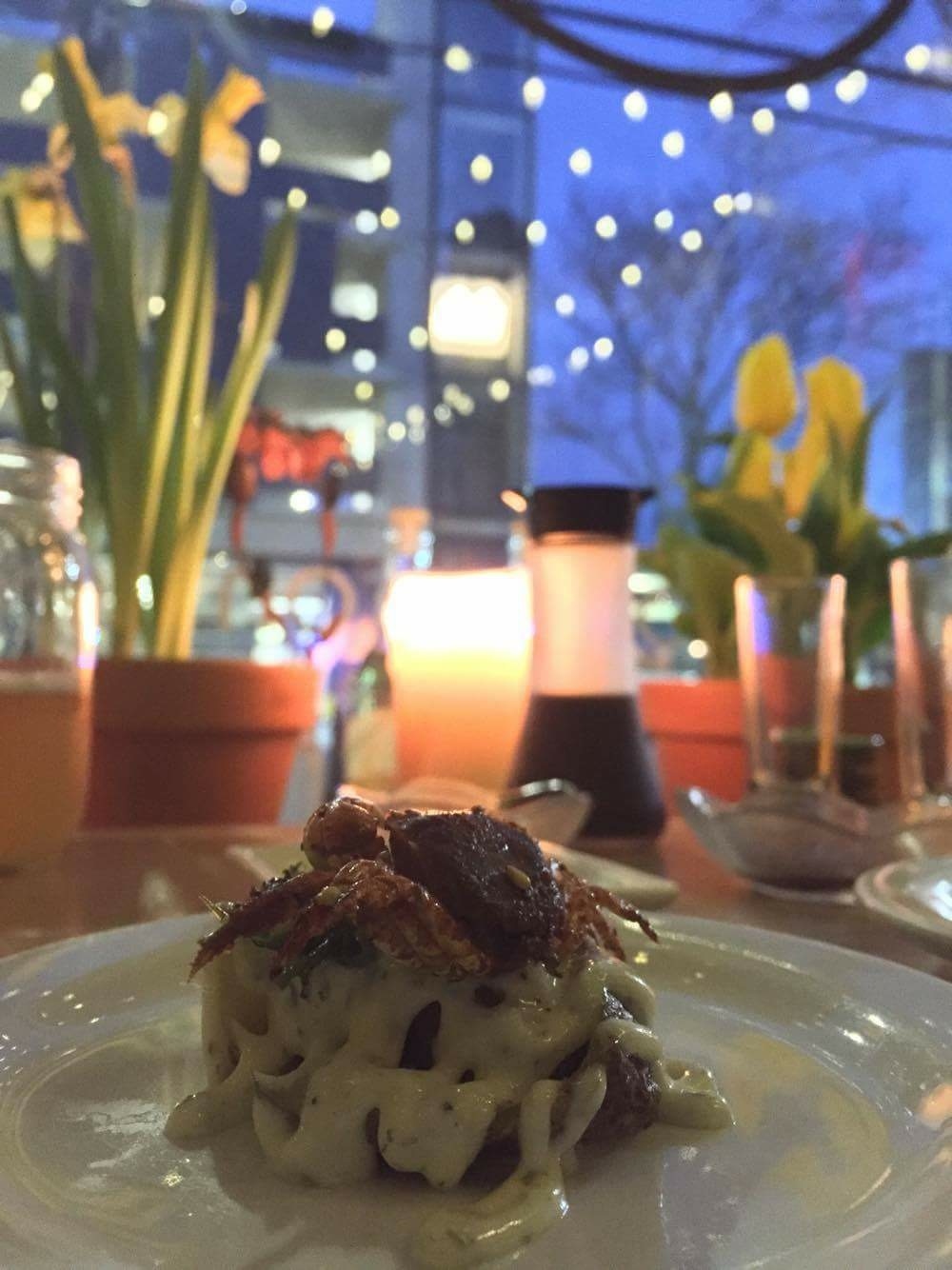
Miya's sushi roll made with invasive Asian shore crab

== Reception and awards ==
- 2018: James Beard Foundation - Finalist for Blind Sushi
- 2016: White House Champions of Change for sustainable seafood
- 2013: James Beard Foundation - Best Chef nominee
- Best of New England - Yankee Magazine
- Best restaurants in Connecticut - Expert's Picks
- Monterey Bay Aquarium - Sustainable Seafood Award and 2011 Seafood Ambassador Award
- Fish2Fork - top 10 most sustainable seafood restaurants in the U.S.
- 2010: Elm Ivy Award
- Key to the City of New Haven

== In popular culture ==
- Miya's was lampooned by Saturday Night Live for its use of cicadas in sushi.
- Miya's appeared on Good Food America.
- Miya's chef Bun Lai appeared as a contestant on Food Network's Chopped.

== See also ==
- List of sushi restaurants
