= Seafood Choices Alliance =

Defunct program

The Seafood Choices Alliance was a program of the nonprofit ocean conservation organization, SeaWeb. It was established in 2001 to bring together the disparate elements and diverse approaches in a growing "seafood choices" movement in the United States and expanded into Europe in 2005. The stated goals of Seafood Choices Alliance are to promote sustainable seafood and to make the seafood industry socially, environmentally and economically sustainable.

== History ==
Following on the heels of SeaWeb's "Give Swordfish a Break" campaign in 1998, there seemed to be a need for an effort that could effectively coordinate the work of NGOs (non-governmental organizations) focusing on sustainable fisheries and healthy oceans. Ultimately, it became clear that the task was not just to bring NGOs together to talk about their work, but to bring business together with NGOs and others to work on solutions. Today, Seafood Choices connects multiple constituencies, with a focus on the conservation community and the seafood value chain.

The sustainable seafood movement is a young one, tracing its origins back to 1996 when Unilever and the World Wildlife Fund (WWF) began discussions on how to assure the long-term sustainability of global fish stocks and the integrity of the marine ecosystem. These talks led to the creation of the Marine Stewardship Council (MSC), the world’s first seafood eco-label provider, in 1997. Three years later, the first MSC certified fishery was announced. At the same time, the Monterey Bay Aquarium was distributing the first version of the Seafood Watch wallet card for consumers, identifying good and bad seafood choices based on environmental consideration.

During the short time since the sustainable seafood movement began, and as a result of the work of Seafood Choices and others, Unilever is now being joined by a spate of companies – from Wal-Mart and retail giant Ahold USA to Darden Restaurants and McDonald's – seeking to improve their sourcing. Many would agree that those commitments have served as a catalyst across the broader seafood industry.

== Initiatives ==
Programs and projects worked on by SeaWeb included

- The Seafood Summit
- Seafood Champion Awards
- GRI Seafood Workshops and Publications and Market research

=== Seafood Summit ===
Hosted by SeaWeb and Diversified Communications, the Seafood Summit was the only annual event solely devoted to sustainable seafood issues. The Seafood Summit brought together global representatives from the seafood industry and conservation community for in-depth discussions, presentations and networking with the goal of making the seafood marketplace environmentally, socially and economically sustainable.

=== Seafood Champion Awards ===
The Seafood Champion Awards were started in 2006 to annually recognize individuals and companies for outstanding leadership in promoting environmentally responsible seafood. SeaWeb established the award to honor those in the seafood industry whose past and/or present contributions demonstrate a commitment to innovation that leads to change.

=== GRI Seafood Workshops ===
A partnership between Seafood Choices Alliance and the Global Reporting Initiative, the GRI Seafood Workshops was intended to enable companies and stakeholders to better measure and communicate progress on sustainability (i.e. economic, environmental and social performance) to their key internal and external audiences. This was based on the principle that good measurement supports good management and is a prerequisite for good communication.

== See also ==
- Marine Stewardship Council
- Monterey Bay Aquarium
- Seafood Watch
- Sustainability
- Overfishing
- World Wide Fund for Nature
- Unilever

== Notes ==
- "Survey Finds Widespread Approval Adoption of Sustainable Seafood", GreenBiz.com, March 6, 2008.
- "Seafood Champion", Bon Appetit, March 13, 2007.
- "Retailers Expect Surge in Sustainable Seafood Sales", Daily Seafood News, July 5, 2008.
- "First European Summit Concludes", Fish Farmer, February 1, 2008.
- "Eco-buying Ups the Ante", Seafood Business, October 2004
- "SCA Tabs Six Seafood Champions", Seafood Source, March 15, 2009.
