= Sepiola pfefferi =

Conservation status
- Data Deficient (IUCN 3.1)

Scientific classification
- Kingdom: Animalia
- Phylum: Mollusca
- Class: Cephalopoda
- Order: Sepiolida
- Family: Sepiolidae
- Subfamily: Sepiolinae
- Genus: Sepiola
- Species: S. pfefferi

Binomial name
- Sepiola pfefferi Grimpe, 1921

Species of mollusc

Sepiola pfefferi is a species of bobtail squid native to the northeastern Atlantic Ocean. Specifically, it occurs on the continental shelf off the Faroe Islands and from southern Norway to Brittany in France. The depth range of this species is unknown.

Female S. pfefferi are on average slightly larger than males. They grow to 13 mm and 12 mm in mantle length, respectively.

The type specimen was collected in the North Sea (53°53′N 00°32′E) and is deposited in the Zoology Collection of the Natural History Museum, Berlin.

The validity of S. pfefferi has been questioned.
