= Inioteuthis capensis =

Conservation status
- Data Deficient (IUCN 3.1)

Scientific classification
- Kingdom: Animalia
- Phylum: Mollusca
- Class: Cephalopoda
- Order: Sepiolida
- Family: Sepiolidae
- Subfamily: Sepiolinae
- Genus: Inioteuthis
- Species: I. capensis

Binomial name
- Inioteuthis capensis Voss, 1962

Synonyms
- Rondeletiola capensis (Voss, 1962)

Species of mollusc

Inioteuthis capensis is a species of bobtail squid native to the southeastern Atlantic Ocean, specifically from Lüderitz Bay to Mossel Bay off South Africa.

The type specimen was collected off South Africa and is deposited at the South African Museum in Cape Town.
