= Euprymna hyllebergi =

Conservation status
- Data Deficient (IUCN 3.1)

Scientific classification
- Kingdom: Animalia
- Phylum: Mollusca
- Class: Cephalopoda
- Order: Sepiolida
- Family: Sepiolidae
- Subfamily: Sepiolinae
- Genus: Euprymna
- Species: E. hyllebergi

Binomial name
- Euprymna hyllebergi Nateewathana, 1997

Species of mollusc

Euprymna hyllebergi, the Thai bobtail squid is a species of squid belonging to the family Sepiolidae and is native to the eastern Indian Ocean. It is commonly found in the Andaman Sea of Thailand and in the Gulf of Thailand. E. hyllebergi can grow up to 35mm in mantle length and can be found in depths as low as 74m. The Thai bobtail squid is covered in chromatophores, which are pigmented cells that can expand or contract and are used to camouflage the squid. The normal lifespan of the Thai bobtail squid is between 92 and 122 days for males and between 80 and 113 days for females.

== Taxonomy ==
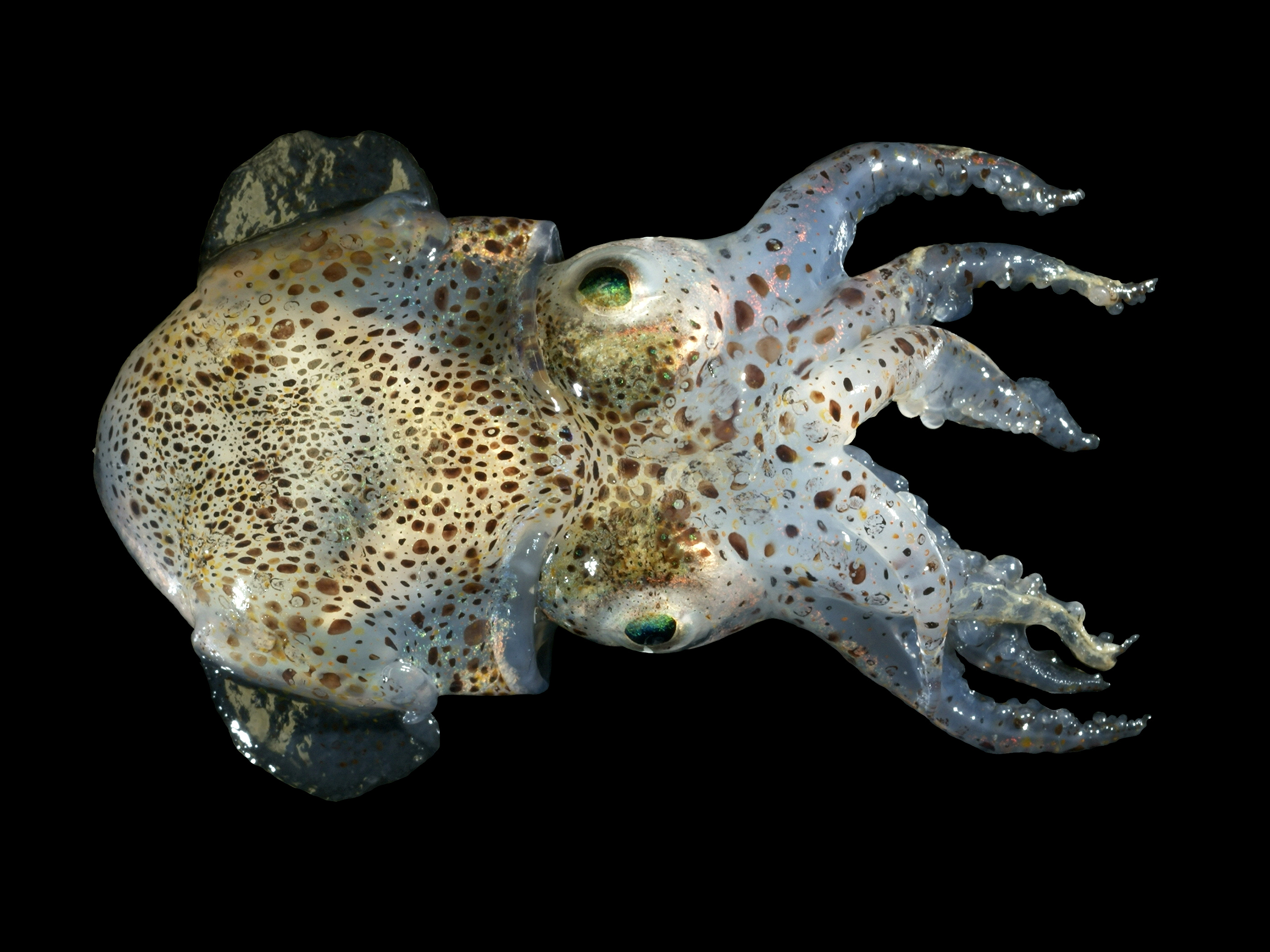
Pictured is a captured Sepiola atlantica, belonging to the same class as the Thai bobtail squid.

The Thai bobtail squid is a member of the family Sepiolidae.

== Life cycle ==
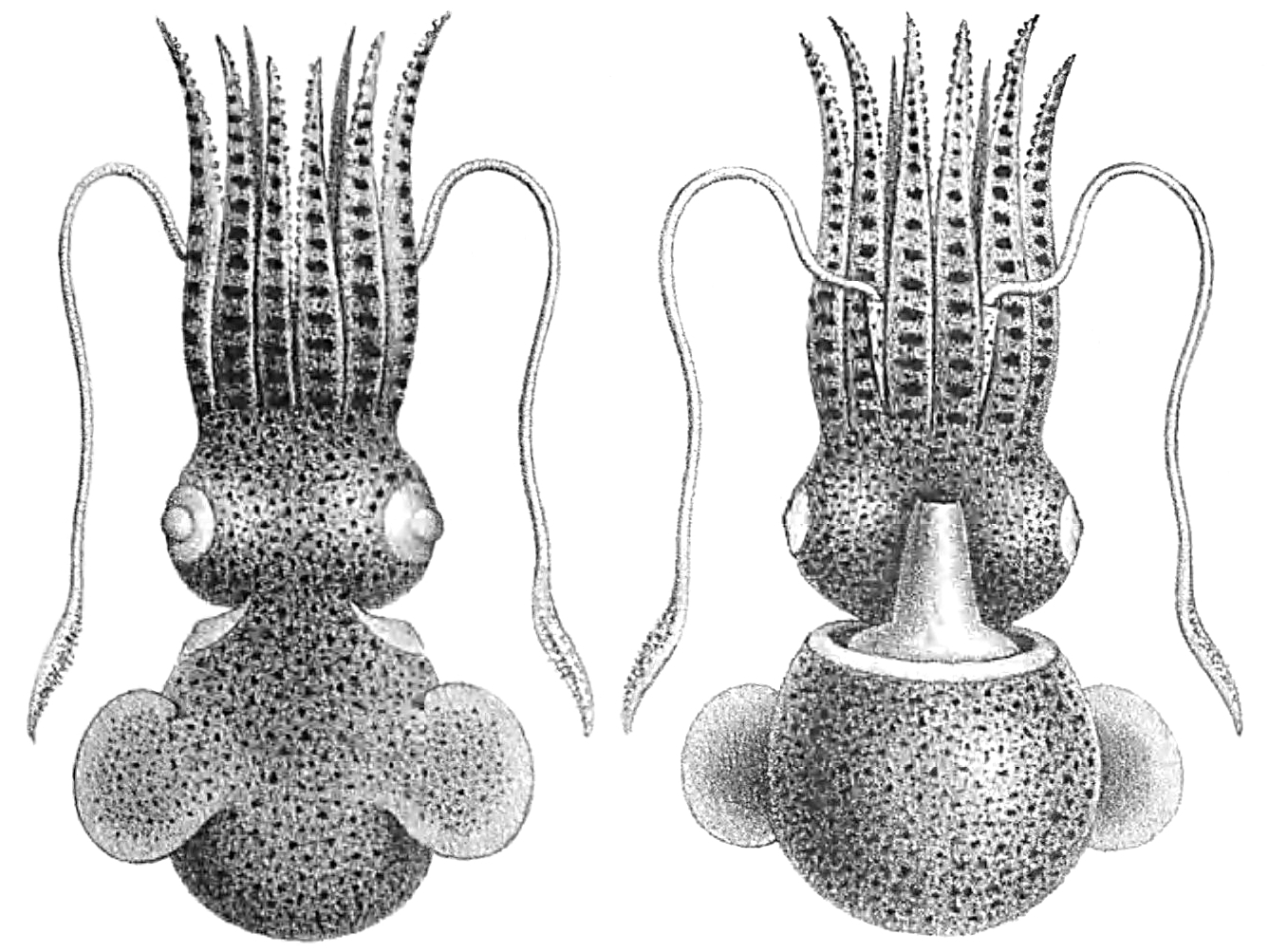
A sketch of Euprymna stenodactyla, a species closely related to Euprymna hyllebergi

E. hyllebergi females deposit single, white pyramid-shaped egg capsules. Two hours after being laid, the outer layer of the eggs become a brown color and, after 5 days, eggs become transparent with the embryo visible. After an incubation period of 12 to 16 days, E. hyllebergi hatchlings emerge in a planktonic state with a visible internal yolk sac. After 6 to 8 hours, E. hyllebergi leave the planktonic state and become benthic. Thai bobtail squid typically live between three and ten months, reaching sexual maturity around two months old.

When mating, males perform courtship displays to attract female mates. Once successful, males hold the female and insert the hectocotylus into the female's mantle cavity where fertilization occurs. On average it takes seven to ten minutes for fertilization to occur after the hectocotylus is inserted. After fertilization, females then select an area to lay their egg capsules. Once the area is selected, the egg capsules are laid and the female swims away to select a new area for the remaining capsules. After laying the final capsule, the female swims into the water column where her swimming slows, and her mantle begins to turn yellow and then transparent. The female then shortly sinks down to the substrate and dies between one and four hours after depositing her final egg capsule. Reproducing male Thai bobtail squid typically die a few days after the female. When observed in captivity, the typical lifespan of female E. hyllebergi is between 80 and 113 days while the typical lifespan of male E. hyllebergi is between 92 and 122 days.

== Physical appearance ==
The mantles, heads, and arms of Euprymna hyllebergi are covered in chromatophores which are pigmented cells that can expand and contract. The mantle is a thick, dome-shaped pocket of skin that covers the body. Attached to the middle of the mantle are two fins used as stabilizers and as a way to propel the bobtail squid. The head and eyes are located at the bottom of the mantle with the arms and tentacles coming out beneath the head. E. hyllebergi have eight short arms which are tube-like structures used for hunting and eating prey. On the arms, there are small suckers that act as suction cups and are used to better grasp prey. Male and female bobtail squid have two tentacles that are longer than the arms and are used for capturing prey. Male bobtail squid have an extra arm called the hectocotylus which holds and transfers spermatophores to females.

== Bioluminescence ==
The Thai bobtail squid acts as a host for luminescent bacteria in the family Vibrionaceae. The relationship between the Vibrionaceae bacteria and its host is a mutual, symbiotic relationship in which the bacteria inhabits a light organ located within the squid. Some bacteria species found in captured E. hyllebergi are Vibrio rumoiensis and Vibrio harveyi. Other strains of bioluminescent bacteria have been found on E. hyllebergi individuals but, these strains have not yet been identified. The bacteria that lives on the Thai bobtail squid acts as a form of camouflage, with the luminescence produced matching the wavelengths and intensity of light, allowing the Thai bobtail squid to hide and blend in with its environment.

== Growth ==
Thai bobtail squid hatchlings can grow from 2mm to 7mm within their first month of life. Growth models of captive populations demonstrate two growth phases. Phase one occurs from hatching to day 30 and phase two begins when benthic young are able to ingest dead fish meat. Dorsal mantle lengths are recorded of 21mm to 46.5mm in males and 24mm to 50mm in females.

== Behavior ==
Euprymna hyllebergi have been observed burrowing into the sand and burying themselves to create a coat of sand over their bodies. When beginning to burrow into the sand, E. hyllebergi use a mix of rocking their mantles, fin beating, and water jetting to dig their way beneath. To completely bury themselves below, they sweep their third arm backwards to collect sand grains and place them over their heads. This sand coat is used to camouflage the Thai bobtail squid from predators and prey. E. hyllebergi spend most of the day burrowed in these sand coats and emerge at night to hunt. When not in the presence of sand, E. hyllebergi rest near corals and rocks. As a form of defense, E. hyllebergi can discharge ink which then confuses and distracts predators, allowing them time to escape. E. hyllebergi are often seen swimming at night rather than during the day. While swimming, E. hyllebergi are able to camouflage through disruptive coloration which occurs when the mantle becomes transparent with visible brown spots.

== Feeding ==
During the day, Thai bobtail squid hide under sand coats and bury themselves to avoid being seen by predators. E. hyllebergi typically feed on live prey at night by capturing prey with their tentacles and arms. When hunting for prey, the tentacles are used for capturing the meal while the arms are used to hold it in place. E. hyllebergi will sometimes release small amounts of ink when hunting to distract prey. E. hyllebergi have a diet consisting of small shrimp and crustaceans.

== Distribution ==
Euprymna hyllebergi are found in the eastern Indian ocean, specifically in the Andaman Sea off Thailand. Nearly all collected specimens were found in the Andaman Sea and off the Gulf of Thailand. Populations of this species in Thailand are geographically isolated as the populations are separated by the Malaysian peninsula, making migration between the populations difficult. However, this movement of the Thai bobtail squid is not impossible as, in 1977, the squid was spotted in the southern Arabian Sea along the Indian coast.
