= Sepiola steenstrupiana =

Conservation status
- Data Deficient (IUCN 3.1)

Scientific classification
- Kingdom: Animalia
- Phylum: Mollusca
- Class: Cephalopoda
- Order: Sepiolida
- Family: Sepiolidae
- Subfamily: Sepiolinae
- Genus: Sepiola
- Species: S. steenstrupiana

Binomial name
- Sepiola steenstrupiana Levy, 1912

Synonyms
- Sepiola tenera Naef, 1912

Species of mollusc

Sepiola steenstrupiana, also known as Steenstrup's bobtail, is a species of bobtail squid native to the Gulf of Aden in the Red Sea, waters off Somalia, and the Mediterranean Sea, including the central Tyrrhenian Sea, the Adriatic Sea, the Aegean Sea, and the Levantine Sea.

S. steenstrupiana grows to 30 mm in mantle length.

The type locality is given simply as "Villafranca". It is unknown where the type specimen is deposited. The species is named in honour of the Danish zoologist Japetus Steenstrup.
