= Inioteuthis japonica =

Conservation status
- Data Deficient (IUCN 3.1)

Scientific classification
- Kingdom: Animalia
- Phylum: Mollusca
- Class: Cephalopoda
- Order: Sepiolida
- Family: Sepiolidae
- Subfamily: Sepiolinae
- Genus: Inioteuthis
- Species: I. japonica

Binomial name
- Inioteuthis japonica (Tilesius in Férussac & d'Orbigny, 1845)

Synonyms
- Sepiola japonica Tilesius in Férussac & d'Orbigny, 1845; Inioteuthis inioteuthis Naef, 1912

Species of mollusc

Inioteuthis japonica is a species of bobtail squid native to the western Pacific Ocean, specifically the waters off China, Taiwan, and southern Japan.

I. japonica grows to 20 mm in mantle length.

The type specimen was collected off Japan. It was originally deposited at the Muséum National d'Histoire Naturelle in Paris, but is no longer extant.
