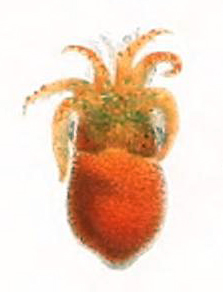

Conservation status
- Least Concern (IUCN 3.1)

Scientific classification
- Kingdom: Animalia
- Phylum: Mollusca
- Class: Cephalopoda
- Order: Sepiolida
- Family: Sepiolidae
- Subfamily: Sepiolinae
- Genus: Sepiola
- Species: S. aurantiaca

Binomial name
- Sepiola aurantiaca Jatta, 1896

Synonyms
- ?Sepiola (Hemisepiola) pfefferi (authority unknown)

= Sepiola aurantiaca =

Species of mollusc

Sepiola aurantiaca, also known as the golden bobtail squid, is a rare species of bobtail squid native to the northeastern Atlantic Ocean. It ranges from southern Norway to the western Mediterranean Sea. S. aurantiaca occurs on the outer continental shelf and in the upper bathyal zone. The depth range of this species is possibly from 200 to 400 m.

Both sexes of S. aurantiaca grow to 20 mm in mantle length.

The type specimen was collected in the Tyrrhenian Sea and is deposited at the Stazione Zoologica in Naples.
