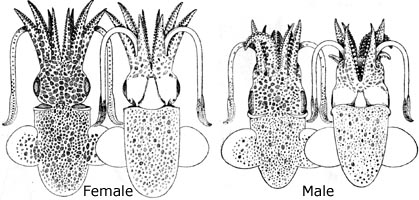
- Rondeletiola minor from the Mediterranean Sea (20 mm ML, 17 mm ML)

Conservation status
- Data Deficient (IUCN 3.1)

Scientific classification
- Kingdom: Animalia
- Phylum: Mollusca
- Class: Cephalopoda
- Order: Sepiolida
- Family: Sepiolidae
- Subfamily: Sepiolinae
- Tribe: Sepiolini
- Genus: Rondeletiola; Naef, 1921
- Species: R. minor

Binomial name
- Rondeletiola minor (Naef, 1912)

Synonyms
- Sepietta minor Naef, 1912

= Rondeletiola minor =

Species of mollusc

Rondeletiola minor, also known as the lentil bobtail, is a species of bobtail squid native to the eastern Atlantic Ocean and Mediterranean Sea. Its natural range covers the northwest of Spain, Portugal, and the eastern, central and western Mediterranean Sea (including the Ligurian Sea, northern and southern Tyrrhenian Sea, Strait of Sicily, Gulf of Taranto, Adriatic Sea, north Aegean Sea, Sea of Marmara, and Levantine Sea) to the southeastern Atlantic Benguela Current off Namibia.

R. minor grows to a mantle length (ML) of 23 mm.

The type specimen was collected in the Tyrrhenian Sea and is deposited at the Stazione Zoologica in Naples.

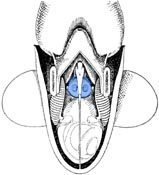
Ventral view of the mantle cavity (circular organ of fused photophores highlighted in blue)

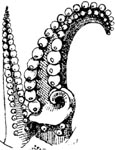
Oral view of arms I
