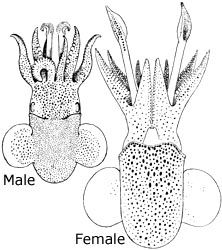
- Sepiola rondeletii from the Mediterranean Sea (17 mm ML, 23 mm ML)
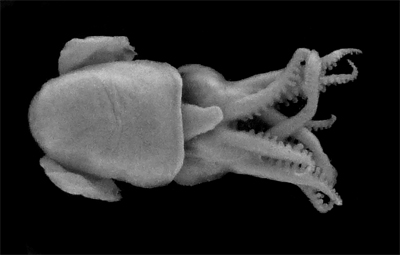

Conservation status
- Data Deficient (IUCN 3.1)

Scientific classification
- Kingdom: Animalia
- Phylum: Mollusca
- Class: Cephalopoda
- Order: Sepiolida
- Family: Sepiolidae
- Subfamily: Sepiolinae
- Genus: Sepiola
- Species: S. rondeletii

Binomial name
- Sepiola rondeletii Leach, 1817

Synonyms
- Loligo sepiola Blainville, 1828; Sepia sepiola Linnaeus, 1758; Sepiola desvigniana Gervais & Van Beneden, 1838; Sepiola grantiana Ferussac, 1834; Sepiola rondeleti Leach, 1817; Sepiola vulgaris Grant, 1833

= Sepiola rondeletii =

Species of mollusc

Sepiola rondeletii, also known as the dwarf bobtail, is a species of bobtail squid native to the northeastern Atlantic Ocean and the Mediterranean Sea, including the Strait of Sicily, Aegean Sea, Adriatic Sea, Sea of Marmara, and Levantine Sea. In the northeastern Atlantic, its natural range extends from the North Sea to Senegal. Females grow to 60 mm in mantle length (though usually from 40 to 50 mm), while males are not known to exceed 25 mm ML.

The type specimen was collected in the Mediterranean Sea and was deposited at the Muséum National d'Histoire Naturelle in Paris. It no longer exists.
