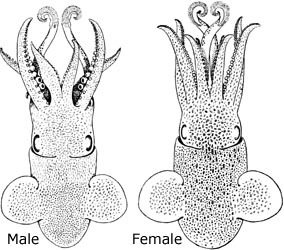
- Sepietta oweniana

Scientific classification
- Kingdom: Animalia
- Phylum: Mollusca
- Class: Cephalopoda
- Order: Sepiolida
- Family: Sepiolidae
- Subfamily: Sepiolinae
- Genus: Sepietta; Naef, 1912

Type species
- Sepiola oweniana d'Orbigny in Ferussac & d'Orbigny, 1839-1841

Species
- See text.

= Sepietta =

Genus of molluscs

Sepietta is a genus of bobtail squid comprising three species.

== Species ==
- Sepietta neglecta, elegant bobtail
- Sepietta obscura
- Sepietta oweniana, common bobtail

Sepietta petersi, the mysterious bobtail, is regarded as a synonym of S. oweniana.
