= Euprymna penares =

Conservation status
- Data Deficient (IUCN 3.1)

Scientific classification
- Kingdom: Animalia
- Phylum: Mollusca
- Class: Cephalopoda
- Order: Sepiolida
- Family: Sepiolidae
- Subfamily: Sepiolinae
- Genus: Euprymna
- Species: E. penares

Binomial name
- Euprymna penares (Gray, 1849)

Synonyms
- Fidenas penares Gray, 1849

Species of mollusc

Euprymna penares is a species of bobtail squid native to waters of the Indo-Pacific; its exact distribution is unknown. Little is known about the size range of this species.

The type specimen was collected off Singapore and is deposited at The Natural History Museum in London.

The validity of E. penares has been questioned.
