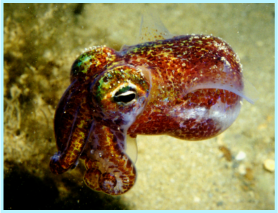
- The Hawaiian bobtail squid, Euprymna scolopes, swimming in the water column off the south shore of Oahu

Conservation status
- Data Deficient (IUCN 3.1)

Scientific classification
- Kingdom: Animalia
- Phylum: Mollusca
- Class: Cephalopoda
- Order: Sepiolida
- Family: Sepiolidae
- Subfamily: Sepiolinae
- Genus: Euprymna
- Species: E. scolopes

Binomial name
- Euprymna scolopes Berry, 1913

= Euprymna scolopes =

Species of cephalopods known as the Hawaiian bobtail squid

Euprymna scolopes, also known as the Hawaiian bobtail squid, is a species of bobtail squid in the family Sepiolidae native to the central Pacific Ocean, where it occurs in shallow coastal waters off the Hawaiian Islands and Midway Island. The type specimen was collected off the Hawaiian Islands and is located at the National Museum of Natural History in Washington, D.C.

Euprymna scolopes grows to 30 mm (1.2 in) in mantle length. Hatchlings weigh 0.005 g (0.00018 oz) and mature in 80 days. Adults weigh up to 2.67 g (0.094 oz).

In the wild, E. scolopes feeds on species of shrimp, including Halocaridina rubra, Palaemon debilis, and Palaemon pacificus. In the laboratory, E. scolopes has been reared on a varied diet of animals, including mysids (Anisomysis sp.), brine shrimp (Artemia salina), mosquitofish (Gambusia affinis), prawns (Leander debilis), and octopuses (Octopus cyanea).

The Hawaiian monk seal (Monachus schauinslandi) preys on E. scolopes in northwestern Hawaiian waters.

On June 3, 2021, SpaceX CRS-22 launched E. scolopes, along with tardigrades, to the International Space Station. The squid were launched as hatchlings and will be studied to see if they can incorporate their symbiotic bacteria Vibrio fischeri into their light organ while in space.

== Symbiosis ==
Euprymna scolopes lives in a symbiotic relationship with the bioluminescent bacteria Aliivibrio fischeri, which inhabits a special light organ in the squid's mantle. To allow this symbiotic relationship, Crumbs protein must first induce apoptosis, which kills superficial epithelial tissue found in Euprymna scolopes. Unlike the superficial tissue, epithelial cells in deep invaginations of the internal part of the light organ, known as crypts, directly take in the bioluminescent Aliivibrio fischeri and do not undergo apoptosis. The bacteria are fed a sugar and amino acid solution by the squid and in return hide the squid's silhouette when viewed from below by matching the amount of light hitting the top of the mantle (counter-illumination). E. scolopes serves as a model organism for animal-bacterial symbiosis and its relationship with A. fischeri has been carefully studied.

=== Acquisition ===
The bioluminescent bacterium, A. fischeri, is horizontally transmitted throughout the E. scolopes population. Hatchlings lack these necessary bacteria and must carefully select for them in a marine world saturated with other microorganisms.

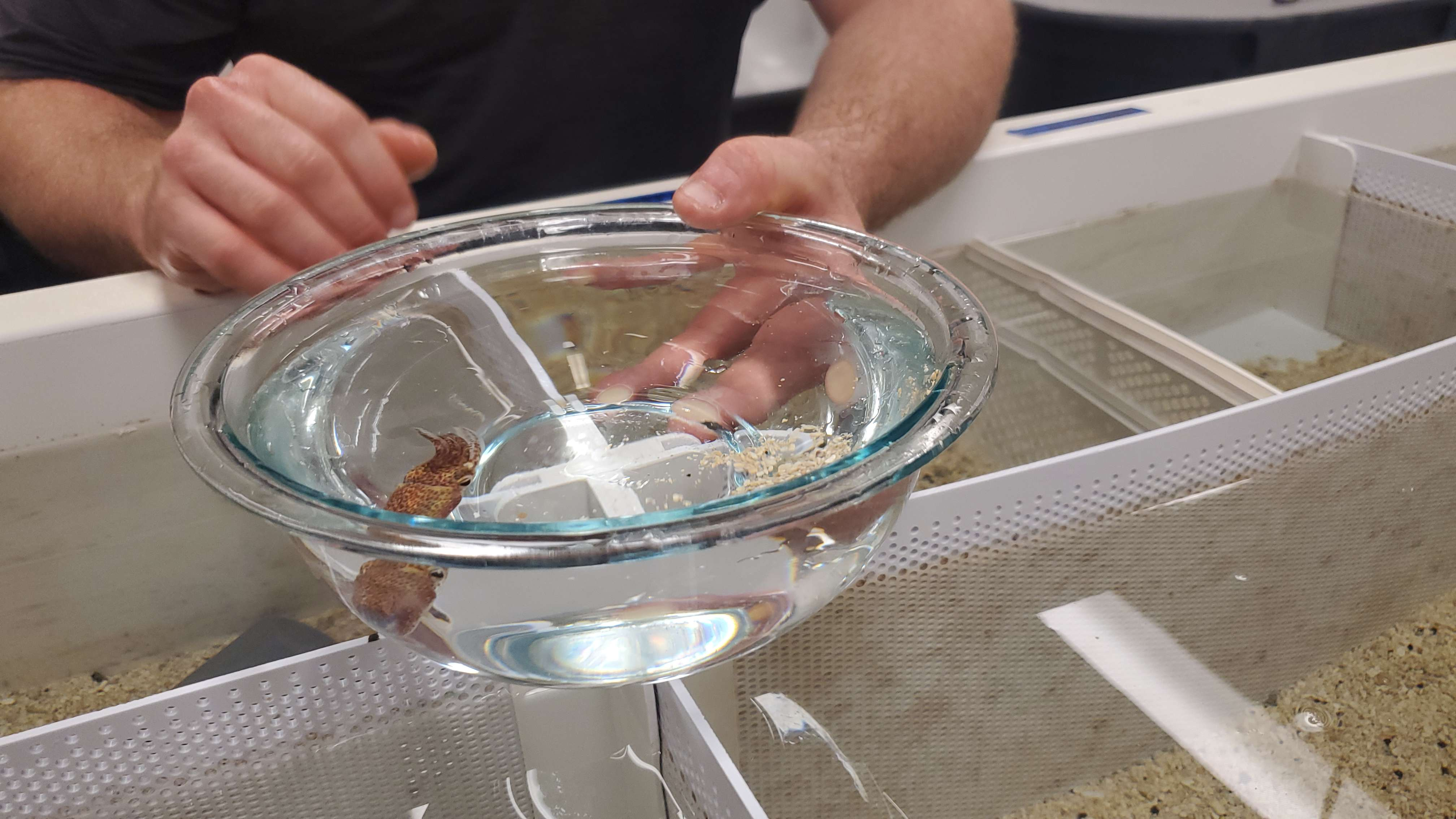
An adult Hawaiian bobtail squid being handled by a researcher at the California Institute of Technology. The researcher is studying how the squid select for A. fischeri as hatchlings.

To effectively capture these cells, E. scolopes secretes mucus in response to peptidoglycan (a major cell wall component of bacteria). The mucus inundates the ciliated fields in the immediate area around the six pores of the light organ and captures a large variety of bacteria. However, by some unknown mechanism, A. fischeri is able to outcompete other bacteria in the mucus.

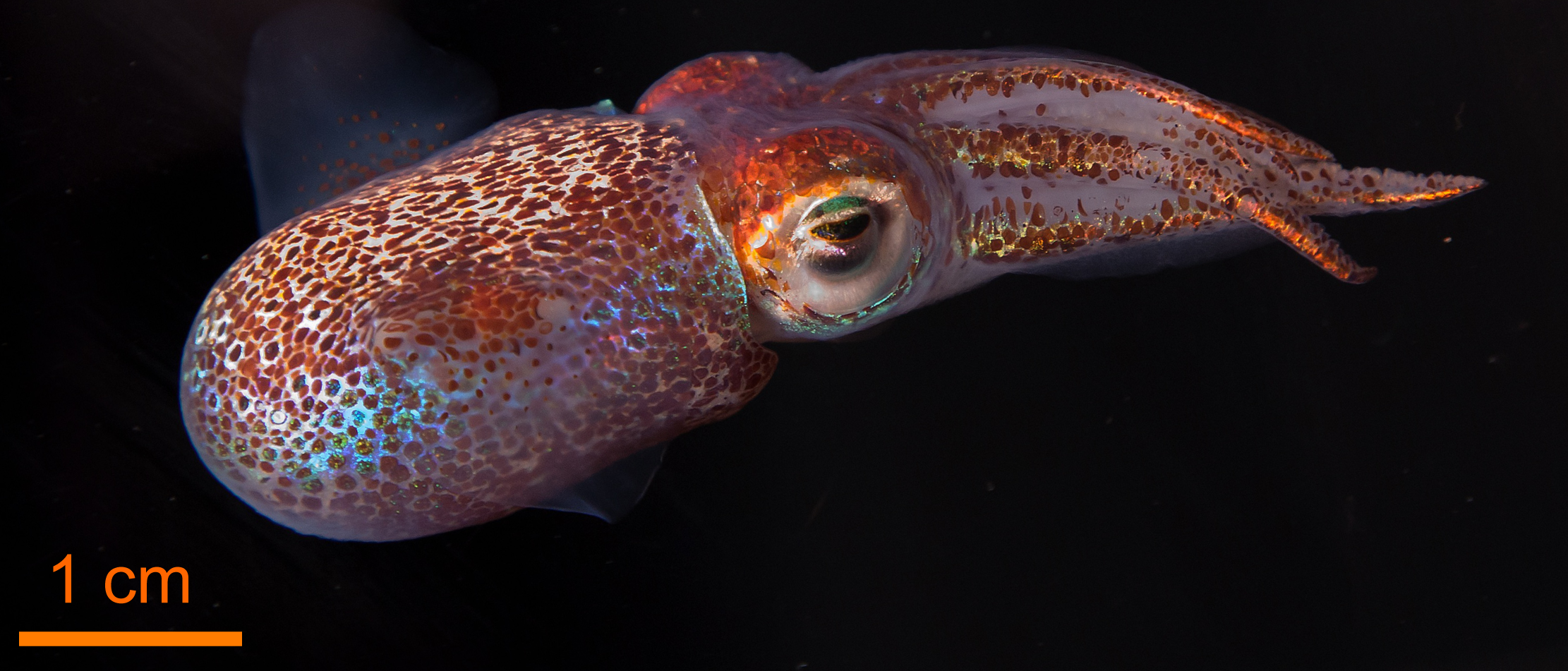
Adult Euprymna scolopes with scale.

As A. fischeri cells aggregate in the mucus, they must use their flagella to migrate through the pores and down into the ciliated ducts of the light organ and endure another barrage of host factors meant to ensure only A. fischeri colonization. Besides the relentless host-derived current that forces motility-challenged bacteria out of the pores, a number of reactive oxygen species makes the environment unbearable. Squid halide peroxidase is the main enzyme responsible for crafting this microbiocidal environment, using hydrogen peroxide as a substrate, but A. fischeri has evolved a brilliant counterattack. A. fischeri possesses a periplasmic catalase that captures hydrogen peroxide before it can be used by the squid halide peroxidase, thus inhibiting the enzyme indirectly. Once through these ciliated ducts, A. fischeri cells swim on towards the antechamber, a large epithelial-lined space, and colonize the narrow epithelial crypts.

The bacteria thrive on the host-derived amino acids and sugars in the antechamber and quickly fill the crypt spaces within 10 to 12 hours after hatching.

=== Ongoing relationship ===
Every second, a juvenile squid ventilates about 2.6 ml (0.092 imp fl oz; 0.088 US fl oz) of ambient seawater through its mantle cavity. Only a single A. fischeri cell, one/1-millionth of the total volume, is present with each ventilation.

The increased amino acids and sugars feed the metabolically demanding bioluminescence of the A. fischeri, and in 12 hours, the bioluminescence peaks and the juvenile squid is able to counterilluminate less than a day after hatching. Bioluminescence demands a substantial amount of energy from a bacterial cell. It is estimated to demand 20% of a cell's metabolic potential.

Nonluminescent strains of A. fischeri would have a definite competitive advantage over the luminescent wild-type, however nonluminescent mutants are never found in the light organ of the E. scolopes. In fact, experimental procedures have shown that removing the genes responsible for light production in A. fischeri drastically reduces colonization efficiency. Luminescent cells, with functioning luciferase, may have a higher affinity for oxygen than for peroxidases, thereby negating the toxic effects of the peroxidases. For this reason, bioluminescence is thought to have evolved as an ancient oxygen detoxification mechanism in bacteria.

=== Venting ===
Despite all the effort that goes into obtaining luminescent A. fischeri, the host squid jettisons most of the cells daily. This process, known as "venting", is responsible for the disposal of up to 95% of A. fischeri in the light organ every morning at dawn. The bacteria gain no benefit from this behavior and the upside for the squid itself is not clearly understood. One reasonable explanation points to the large energy expenditure in maintaining a colony of bioluminescent bacteria.

During the day when the squid are inactive and hidden, bioluminescence is unnecessary, and expelling the A. fischeri conserves energy. Another, more evolutionarily important reason may be that daily venting ensures selection for A. fischeri that have evolved specificity for a particular host, but can survive outside of the light organ.

Since A. fischeri is transmitted horizontally in E. scolopes, maintaining a stable population of them in the open ocean is essential in supplying future generations of squid with functioning light organs.

== Light organ ==
The light organ has an electrical response when stimulated by light, which suggests the organ functions as a photoreceptor that enables the host squid to respond to A. fischeri's luminescence.

Extraocular vesicles collaborate with the eyes to monitor the down-welling light and light created from counterillumination, so as the squid moves to various depths, it can maintain the proper level of output light. Acting on this information, the squid can then adjust the intensity of the bioluminescence by modifying the ink sac, which functions as a diaphragm around the light organ. Furthermore, the light organ contains a network of unique reflector and lens tissues that help reflect and focus the light ventrally through the mantle.

The light organ of embryonic and juvenile squids has a striking anatomical similarity to an eye and expresses several genes similar to those involved in eye development in mammalian embryos (e.g. eya, dac) which indicate that squid eyes and squid light organs may be formed using the same developmental "toolkit".

As the down-welling light increases or decreases, the squid is able to adjust luminescence accordingly, even over multiple cycles of light intensity.

== See also ==
- Reflectin
