= Sepiola rossiaeformis =

Conservation status
- Data Deficient (IUCN 3.1)

Scientific classification
- Kingdom: Animalia
- Phylum: Mollusca
- Class: Cephalopoda
- Order: Sepiolida
- Family: Sepiolidae
- Subfamily: Sepiolinae
- Genus: Sepiola
- Species: S. rossiaeformis

Binomial name
- Sepiola rossiaeformis Pfeffer, 1884

Species of mollusc

Sepiola rossiaeformis is a species of bobtail squid native to the Indo-Pacific. Its exact range is unknown.

Little is known about the size of this species. The type specimen is 6.0 mm in mantle length.

The type specimen was collected off Java and is deposited at the Zoologisches Museum of the Universitat Hamburg.

The validity of S. rossiaeformis has been questioned.
