= Euprymna albatrossae =

Conservation status
- Data Deficient (IUCN 3.1)

Scientific classification
- Kingdom: Animalia
- Phylum: Mollusca
- Class: Cephalopoda
- Order: Sepiolida
- Family: Sepiolidae
- Subfamily: Sepiolinae
- Genus: Euprymna
- Species: E. albatrossae

Binomial name
- Euprymna albatrossae Voss, 1962

Species of mollusc

Euprymna albatrossae is a species of bobtail squid native to the western Pacific Ocean off the Philippines and Japan. The depth range of E. albatrossae is unknown. The type specimens were collected using a nightlight.

E. albatrossae grows to 24 mm (0.94 in) in mantle length.

The type specimen was collected off the Philippines and is deposited at the National Museum of Natural History in Washington, D.C.
