= Inioteuthis =

Scientific classification
- Kingdom: Animalia
- Phylum: Mollusca
- Class: Cephalopoda
- Order: Sepiolida
- Family: Sepiolidae
- Subfamily: Sepiolinae
- Genus: Inioteuthis; Verrill, 1881

Type species
- Sepiola japonica Tilesius in Férussac & d'Orbigny, 1845

Species
- See text.

Genus of molluscs

Inioteuthis is a genus of bobtail squid comprising two species.

== Species ==
- Inioteuthis japonica (Tilesius in Férussac & d'Orbigny, 1845). Native to China, Taiwan, and Japan.
- Inioteuthis maculosa Goodrich, 1896. Native to India, Sri Lanka, Bangladesh, Pakistan, Myanmar, Thailand, Taiwan, Maldives, Iran, Iraq, Kuwait, Bahrain, Qatar, Oman, Saudi Arabia, United Arab Emirates, Philippines, Indonesia, Malaysia, Yemen, and Somalia.

Species brought into synonymy

- Inioteuthis morsei Verrill, 1881: synonym of Euprymna morsei (Verrill, 1881)
