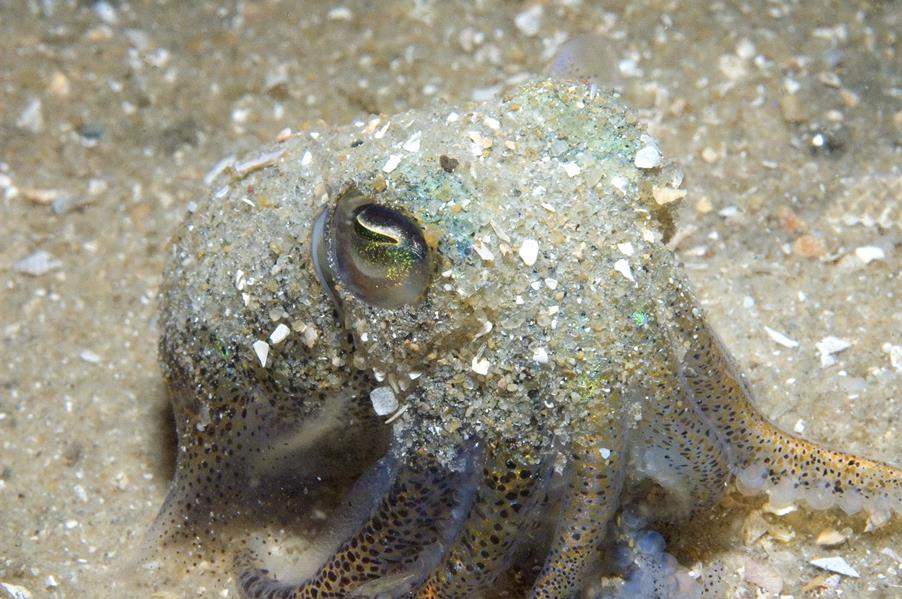

Conservation status
- Data Deficient (IUCN 3.1)

Scientific classification
- Kingdom: Animalia
- Phylum: Mollusca
- Class: Cephalopoda
- Order: Sepiolida
- Family: Sepiolidae
- Subfamily: Sepiolinae
- Genus: Euprymna
- Species: E. tasmanica

Binomial name
- Euprymna tasmanica Pfeffer, 1884

Synonyms
- Inioteuthis tasmanica (Pfeffer, 1884); Sepiola tasmanica Pfeffer, 1884

= Euprymna tasmanica =

Species of mollusc

Euprymna tasmanica, also known as the southern dumpling squid or southern bobtail squid, is a bobtail squid that lives in the shallow (0.5 m to at least 80 m) temperate coastal waters of southern Australia's continental shelf. It lives for between 5 and 8 months and the adults can grow up to 6 or 7 cm long with a mantle length of 3 to 4 cm. They are found in seagrass beds or areas with soft silty or muddy bottoms from Brisbane on the east coast to Shark Bay on the west, as well as around Tasmania. Southern dumpling squid are nocturnal and during the day hide in sand or mud covered in a mucus-lined coat of sediment. If disturbed acid glans can quickly remove this coat as an additional decoy to ink squirting.

== Physical appearance ==
Like other bobtail squid, southern dumpling squid have a light organ fuelled by symbiotic bioluminescent bacteria. The light organ, which is butterfly-shaped, is situated in the mantle cavity and is used to cancel out the bobtail squid's silhouette. There are large semi-circular fins on the rear half of the mantle. Although they can change colour, they are usually an iridescent green or yellow with brown spots. The bobtail squid have four rows of suckers on each arm and both their arms and tentacles are armed with toothed horny rim.

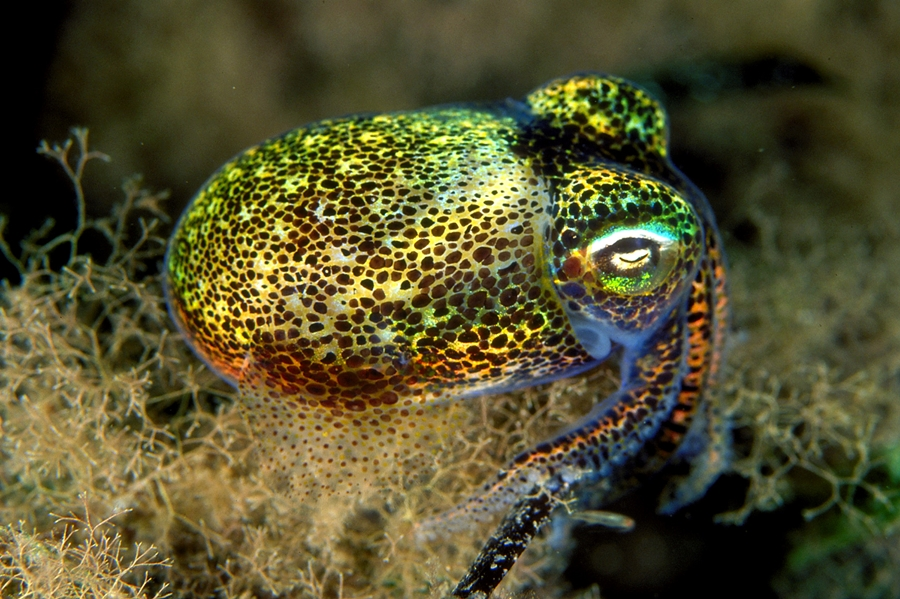
Euprymna tasmanica

== Reproduction ==
Like many cephalopods the male can be distinguished from the female by an enlarged hectocotylus which occurs as the first left arm. Females lay 2 or 3 batches of round creamy orange eggs (25 – 170 eggs per batch) over a few weeks towards the end of their life. Females die between a week and a fortnight after laying eggs and males die a short time after mating multiple times. Females mate with many partners and may use the sperm of more than one partner for one batch of eggs. Depending on temperature incubation can take up to four and a half months, because of this the eggs must be comparatively large to provide enough yolk for successful embryonic development. If the females are underfed while producing eggs they tend to produce fewer and smaller eggs which leads to high embryo mortality rates. Parent Southern Dumpling Squid do not look after their young however the hatchlings are highly developed when born and are capable of catching prey up to twice their size. Young are not born with the needed bacteria for their light organ and must capture them from the water column before the light organ can develop.

== Naming ==
The southern dumpling squid is often referred to as the southern bobtail squid, however this common names also refers to a different smaller Australian species of bobtail squid which has yet to be scientifically named.
