= Rondeletiola =

Scientific classification
- Kingdom: Animalia
- Phylum: Mollusca
- Class: Cephalopoda
- Order: Sepiolida
- Family: Sepiolidae
- Subfamily: Sepiolinae
- Tribe: Sepiolini
- Genus: Rondeletiola; Naef, 1921

Species
- R. capensis (G. L. Voss, 1962); R. minor (Naef, 1912)

Genus of squids

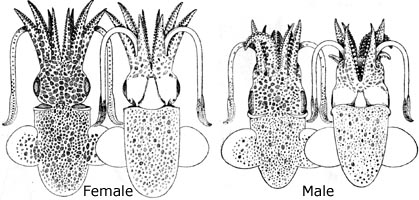
Rondeletiola minor from the Mediterranean Sea (20 mm ML, 17 mm ML)

Rondeletiola is a genus of bobtail squids in the tribe Sepiolini. It was described by Adolf Naef in 1921.
