= Inioteuthis maculosa =

Conservation status
- Least Concern (IUCN 3.1)

Scientific classification
- Kingdom: Animalia
- Phylum: Mollusca
- Class: Cephalopoda
- Order: Sepiolida
- Family: Sepiolidae
- Subfamily: Sepiolinae
- Genus: Inioteuthis
- Species: I. maculosa

Binomial name
- Inioteuthis maculosa Goodrich, 1896

Species of mollusc

Inioteuthis maculosa is a species of bobtail squid native to the Indo-Pacific. It occurs in the northern Indian Ocean, Persian Gulf, Arabian Sea, Bay of Bengal, Andaman Sea, and off India, Taiwan, the Philippines, and Indonesia.

Females grow to 14 mm in mantle length, while males are not known to exceed 13 mm ML.

The type specimen was collected off the Andaman Islands and is deposited at the Zoological Survey of India in Kolkata.
