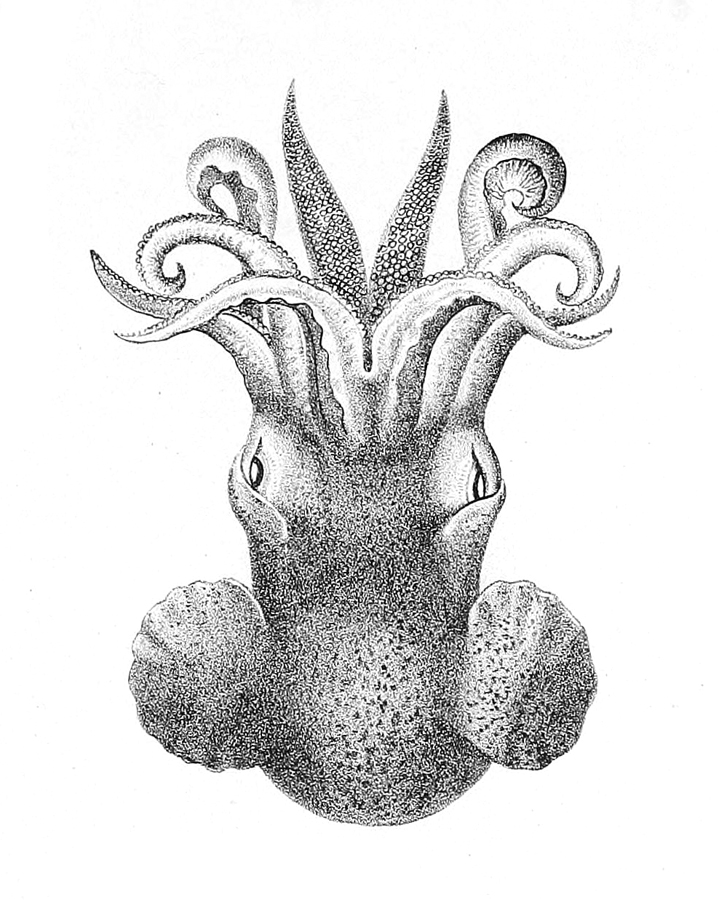

Conservation status
- Data Deficient (IUCN 3.1)

Scientific classification
- Kingdom: Animalia
- Phylum: Mollusca
- Class: Cephalopoda
- Order: Sepiolida
- Family: Sepiolidae
- Subfamily: Sepiolinae
- Genus: Euprymna
- Species: E. morsei

Binomial name
- Euprymna morsei (Verrill, 1881)

Synonyms
- Inioteuthis morsei Verrill, 1881; Euprymna similis Sasaki, 1913

= Euprymna morsei =

Species of mollusc

Euprymna morsei, the Mimika bobtail squid, is a species of Indo-Pacific bobtail squid from the family Sepiolidae.

== Description ==
Euprymna morsei has a plump, dome-shaped mantle in which the dorsal mantle is fused to head. It has wide but short semicircular fins which are shorter than the mantle length either anteriorly or posteriorly. At their posterior ends the fins are widely separated while their anterior origin is behind the margin of the mantle. The suckers on the non-hectocotylised arms are arranged similarly in both sexes in four series. In the males there are around 10 enlarged suckers in the ventral rows of arms II to IV which run towards the tip from the third or fourth suckers counting from the head. The males have a hectocotylus in which the upper half of left dorsal arm is modified with enlarged pedicels to the suckers which are densely packed to form 2 double rows of columnar structures and the suckers are reduced, having very small, fleshy, narrow openings. The inner end of this arm has a single papilla which resembles a nipple. The marginal suckers on arm I are slightly larger than the medial suckers. The tentacular club suckers are cup-shaped or spherical. There is no internal gladius. There are a pair of saddle-shaped bioluminescent organs present in the inside of the mantle cavity on the ink sac. The colour varies from an iridescent gold through to purple, with large black chromatophores. They grow up to 40mm in mantle length. This species is sympatric with and very similar to Euprymna berryi and the females of E. morsei and E. berryi are indistinguishable from one another.

== Distribution ==
Euprymna morsei is found from southern Japan south along the coasts of Korea and China to Malaysia and as far south as Java, a distribution encompassing East and South China Seas, the Yellow Sea, Gulf of Thailand and the Philippines. There have been possible records from the Bay of Bengal and the Maldive Islands, but the Bay of Bengal records, at least, were based on females and are, therefore, uncertain.

However, there is taxonomic uncertainty about the definition of E. morsei and other authorities have stated that this is a temperate species which is only found in the colder seas around Japan. The taxonomy of the genus Euprymna remains to be resolved to define its species limits.

== Biology ==
Euprymna morsei is a shallow water species which spends the day buried in soft substrates and emerge at night to feed, using its bioluminescent organs to emit just enough light to disguise its silhouette from predators such as lancet fish (Alepisaurus ferox).

== Fisheries ==
Euprymna morsei is fished for food on a very small, local scale and sometimes taken as bycatch by fisheries.
