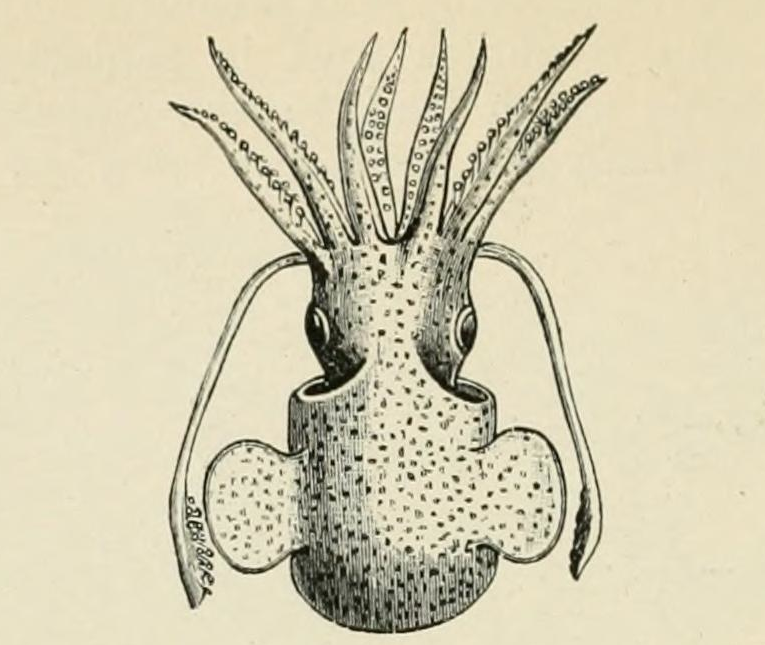
- A wild, live common bobtail squid on the seafloor

Conservation status
- Data Deficient (IUCN 3.1)

Scientific classification
- Kingdom: Animalia
- Phylum: Mollusca
- Class: Cephalopoda
- Order: Sepiolida
- Family: Sepiolidae
- Genus: Sepietta
- Species: S. oweniana

Binomial name
- Sepietta oweniana (d'Orbigny in Ferussac & d'Orbigny, 1839-1841)

Synonyms
- Sepietta petersii (Steenstrup, 1887); Sepiola oweniana d'Orbigny in Ferussac & d'Orbigny, 1839-1841; Sepiola petersi Steenstrup, 1887; Sepiola petersii Steenstrup, 1887; Sepiola scandica Steenstrup, 1887

= Sepietta oweniana =

Species of mollusc

Sepietta oweniana (common bobtail squid or common bobtail) is a common marine mollusc from the order Sepiida, the cuttlefish.

Common bobtails possess large, rounded pupils, eight arms each having biserial suckers and two arms with 32 tiny uniform-sized suckers in transverse rows to be used for securing their prey. The mantle lengths of the common bobtail differ depending on gender, as males range 15 to 29mm whereas females range 18 to 34mm. The average length of a male common bobtail is 15 to 30mm, with females having an average of 18 to 36mm. The weight of a male common bobtail, between 0.1g - 0.7g.on average is more than a male common bobtail average, 0.2g - 1.4g in mass.

Common bobtail squids eat small molluscs, crustaceans, shrimp and small fish. They are predated on by dolphins, sharks, fish, seals and seabirds. The average life expectancy of common bobtails are about 9 months. They are most known for their distribution and abundance in the Mediterranean Sea and the north-east Atlantic Ocean.

== Range and habitat ==
The common bobtail squid is found globally, but is abundant in the eastern Atlantic and across the Mediterranean Sea. The ratio of the female to male found in their habitat is moderately equal. They proliferate in tropical to polar waters. They are more common in tropical, warmer waters in comparison to polar, colder waters. Their range of depth varies depending on season, when during warmer seasons like summer and spring, mature common bobtails dive deeper with the vice versa occurring during winter and autumn.

In comparison to their relatives, the cuttlefish live almost globally with the exception of the Americas coast. Both common bobtails and cuttlefish inhabit tropical and temperate waters.

Common bobtail squids often live near the seafloor, swimming in the open water but resting under the seafloor.

=== Distribution and abundance ===
The common bobtail squid distributional range is in the eastern Atlantic to the Mediterranean Sea spread. Distributed near shore, and mainly in shallow waters around a range from 55m to 751m depths. In a list, they have been found in the Portuguese Coast, Catalan Sea, Tyrrhenian Sea, Strait of Sicily, Greek Aegean Sea and the Baltic Sea.

The abundance of the common bobtail squid depends on how far they are from northern waters and their tolerance to temperature. Around the Mediterranean Sea they have a higher abundance range in comparison to the Atlantic and Baltic Sea's northwestern hemisphere.

== Anatomy ==
Differences in the location they inhabit may change overall length and sizes of the common bobtail squid, specifically that mantle lengths may differ in the western Mediterranean and the Northeast Atlantic.

The common bobtail squid possesses very little photophores which means they can only brighten up a small bit.. In recent times, there have been common bobtail squids with no photophores at all, and with the loss of light organs common bobtail squids do not possess bioluminescent abilities.

To note that their central nervous system, their optic lobe development is well developed when compared to their motor centre.

=== Visual system ===
Common bobtail squid eyes are well developed, as being in the cephalopod class. The eyes have a dense reddish-brown colour with iridescent green around the eyes.

=== Movement ===
Common bobtails move through jet propulsion and synchronous beating of the fins.

== Life cycle ==
The common bobtail squid is known to have one of the shortest life spans among cephalopods. The progression of life for a common bobtail squid goes from hatching from an egg clutch to immature stage to maturity via stages from one to five in about 6–9 months.

To note that with the recent Arctic warming, common bobtails may lose their reproductive functions as the waters during their reproductive seasons may be too warm for their eggs to develop.

=== Reproduction ===
Common bobtail squids are continuous spawners showing growth in between batch-laying, where they lay in egg clutches, and the male sperm is externally ejected into the water for the eggs to be fertilised. Before the eggs are laid, the female squid carries the premature eggs in her body, increasing her body mass. They usually are laid on shallow waters, among rocky substrates or surfaces as nesting grounds.

An egg clutch of a common bobtail female averagely consists of 3 to 130 eggs, the size of these egg clutches is dependent on the time of the year. The peaks of how many eggs in an egg clutch occur in April to May and October to November, particularly may also occur during seasons like summer and spring.

The size of the eggs may also differ depending on the time of the year they are laid, with the largest being laid coinciding with the aforementioned peaks of April to May and October to November. Numerical ranges of the egg sizes go from around 12.63mm to 57.50mm depending on development stage. The location of which the eggs are laid impact the features that the common bobtail will have at later stages, such as the length of the mantle and the length of the tentacle.

=== Maturity ===
A common bobtail's lifespan initially begins from egg to spawn, taking about 4 to 6 months. After which an immature to mature common bobtail may last another 4 to 6 months depending on gender. Effectively meaning that a common bobtail's full lifespan is around a year. Most mature common bobtail squids are present year-round from February to November.

== Diet ==
Common bobtail squid hunt for live prey, mainly free-swimming prey near the bottom layers of the waters. While mature common bobtail hunt and predate, their immature juveniles are scavengers. The hunt during evening and night, ever so rarely during day time, in turn meaning they hunt in low light intensities. It is noted that females do predate and eat more than male common bobtails.

Newly hatched young take shelter on the bottom seafloor, searching day and night swimming freely to hunt and capture prey.

Juvenile common bobtails hunt differently to adult common bobtails. Unlike when they were newly born, over a 10-week period, they adopt a diurnal pattern where they hunt only during dusk to feed until dawn. A juvenile would launch itself towards the prey mouth forward in hopes of grabbing and devouring it on the spot. Adult common bobtail squids wait on the seafloor or nearby substrate, it will position itself for an optimal angle to allow its tentacle to be launched. They eject their tentacle towards the prey, envelope the target with the suckers on the tentacle and drag it back towards the buccal mass within the arms and mouth.

Common bobtail squids conduct foraging migrations, in which whilst they forage they migrate to different areas of the oceans they habit to keep a constant stream of food.

== Taxonomy ==
Taxonomy of the sepietta species is difficult as researchers have to internally invade a specimen to identify it and conduct a comparison.

- Class Cephalopoda
  - Subclass Nautiloidea: nautilus
  - Subclass Coleoidea: squid, octopus, cuttlefish
    - Order Sepiida: cuttlefish
      - Family Sepiolidae
        - Genus Sepietta
          - Species S.oweniana

== Human uses ==
=== Cellular analysis and aging ===
The common bobtail squid is used as a placeholder for checking general cephalopod health, cellular and molecular status because of their abundance and widespread distribution globally. An example of which is studying the DNA sequencing of specimens. Experts have used eggs to mature common bobtail organisms for various research and study. The molecular analysis of the egg clutches allows the “taxonomic and phylogenetic studies of the cephalopod species as a whole.”

Researchers also have used the common bobtail to test variability and mutation of cephalopods due to their widespread abundance, in where they have found the arms of the common bobtail having many anomalies.

Determining the age of a common bobtail is found through the analysis of the statolith. The statolith on a common bobtail squid is small, with a size of 0.41mm to 0.57mm. A statolith has growth marks, bands, that are discernable similar to that of a tree's rings. The more bands a statolith on a common bobtail has, the easier it is to discern their birth month. The statolith is also used as a medium to derive information on many aspects of the cephalopod species life cycle. The statolith is also found in cuttlefish.

== See also ==
- Cephalopod size
