= Euprymna hoylei =

Conservation status
- Data Deficient (IUCN 3.1)

Scientific classification
- Kingdom: Animalia
- Phylum: Mollusca
- Class: Cephalopoda
- Order: Sepiolida
- Family: Sepiolidae
- Subfamily: Sepiolinae
- Genus: Euprymna
- Species: E. hoylei

Binomial name
- Euprymna hoylei Adam, 1986

Species of mollusc

Euprymna hoylei is a species of bobtail squid native to the tropical waters of the Indo-Pacific, specifically the western Pacific Ocean and northwestern Australia. Little is known about the size range of this species.

The type specimen was collected off the Sulu Archipelago and is deposited at the Western Australian Museum in Perth.
