= Eumandya phenax =

Conservation status
- Data Deficient (IUCN 3.1)

Scientific classification
- Kingdom: Animalia
- Phylum: Mollusca
- Class: Cephalopoda
- Order: Sepiolida
- Superfamily: Sepioloidea
- Family: Sepiolidae
- Genus: Eumandya
- Species: E. phenax

Binomial name
- Eumandya phenax (Voss, 1962)

Synonyms
- Euprymna phenax G. L. Voss, 1962

Species of mollusc

Eumandya phenax is a species of bobtail squid native to the waters of the Indo-Pacific, off the Philippines and possibly in the East China Sea. The depth range of this species is unknown. It was originally collected by nightlight.

The type specimen is 11 mm in mantle length.

The type specimen was collected off the Philippines and is deposited at the National Museum of Natural History in Washington, D.C.
