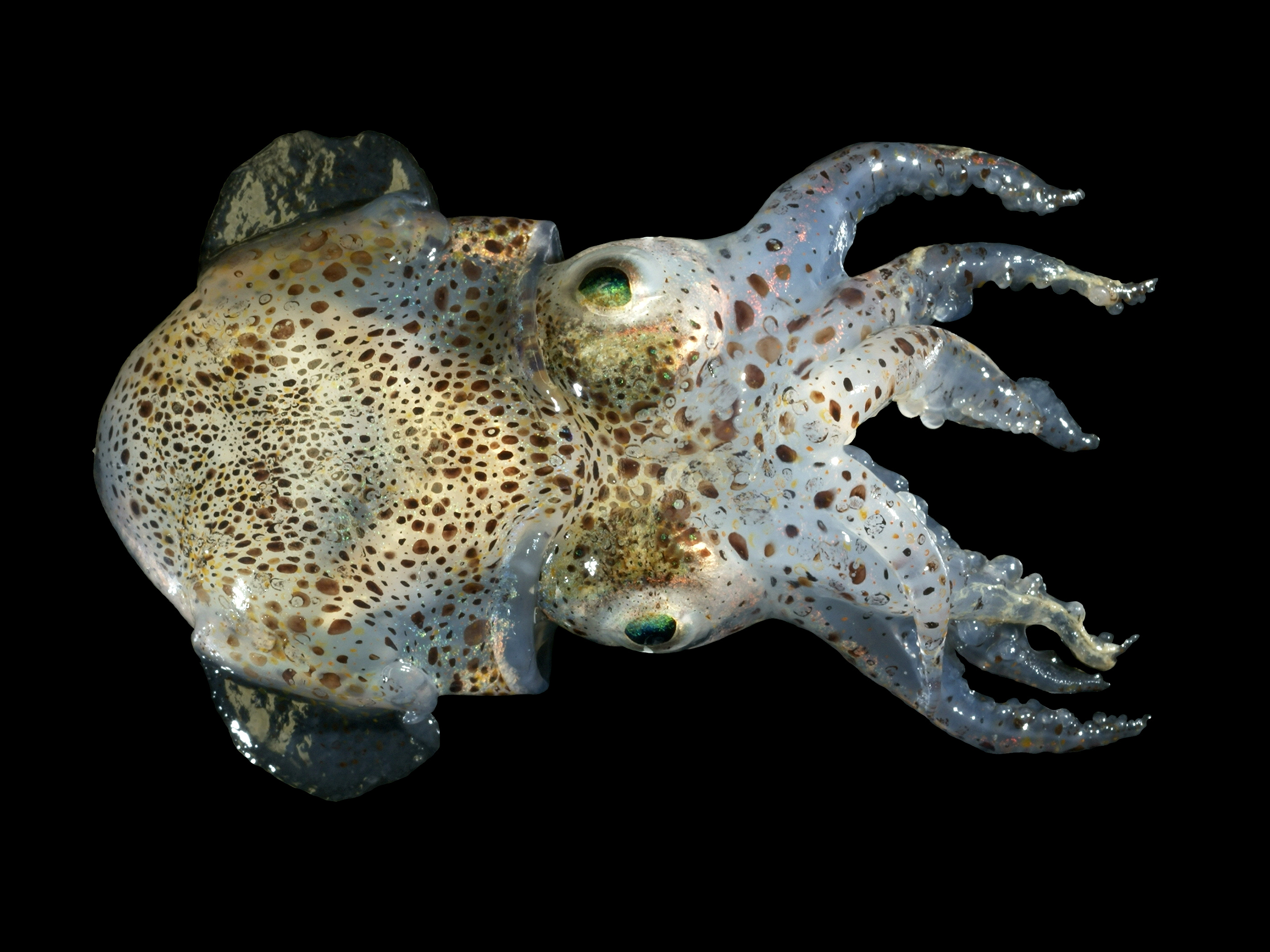
- Sepiola atlantica

Scientific classification
- Kingdom: Animalia
- Phylum: Mollusca
- Class: Cephalopoda
- Order: Sepiolida
- Family: Sepiolidae
- Subfamily: Sepiolinae
- Genus: Sepiola; Leach, 1817

Type species
- Sepiola rondeletii Leach, 1817

Species
- See text.

Synonyms
- Heterosepiola Grimpe, 1922

= Sepiola =

Genus of molluscs

Sepiola is a genus of bobtail squid comprising 10 species:

- Sepiola affinis Naef, 1912, anagolous bobtail
- Sepiola atlantica d'Orbigny in Ferussac & d'Orbigny, 1839-1841, Atlantic bobtail
- Sepiola boletzkyi Bello & Salman, 2015
- Sepiola bursadhaesa Bello, 2013
- Sepiola intermedia Naef, 1912, intermediate bobtail
- Sepiola robusta Naef, 1912, robust bobtail
- Sepiola rondeleti Leach, 1817, dwarf bobtail
- Sepiola rossiaeformis Pfeffer, 1884
- Sepiola steenstrupiana Levy, 1912, Steenstrup's bobtail
- Sepiola tridens de Heij & Goud, 2010
