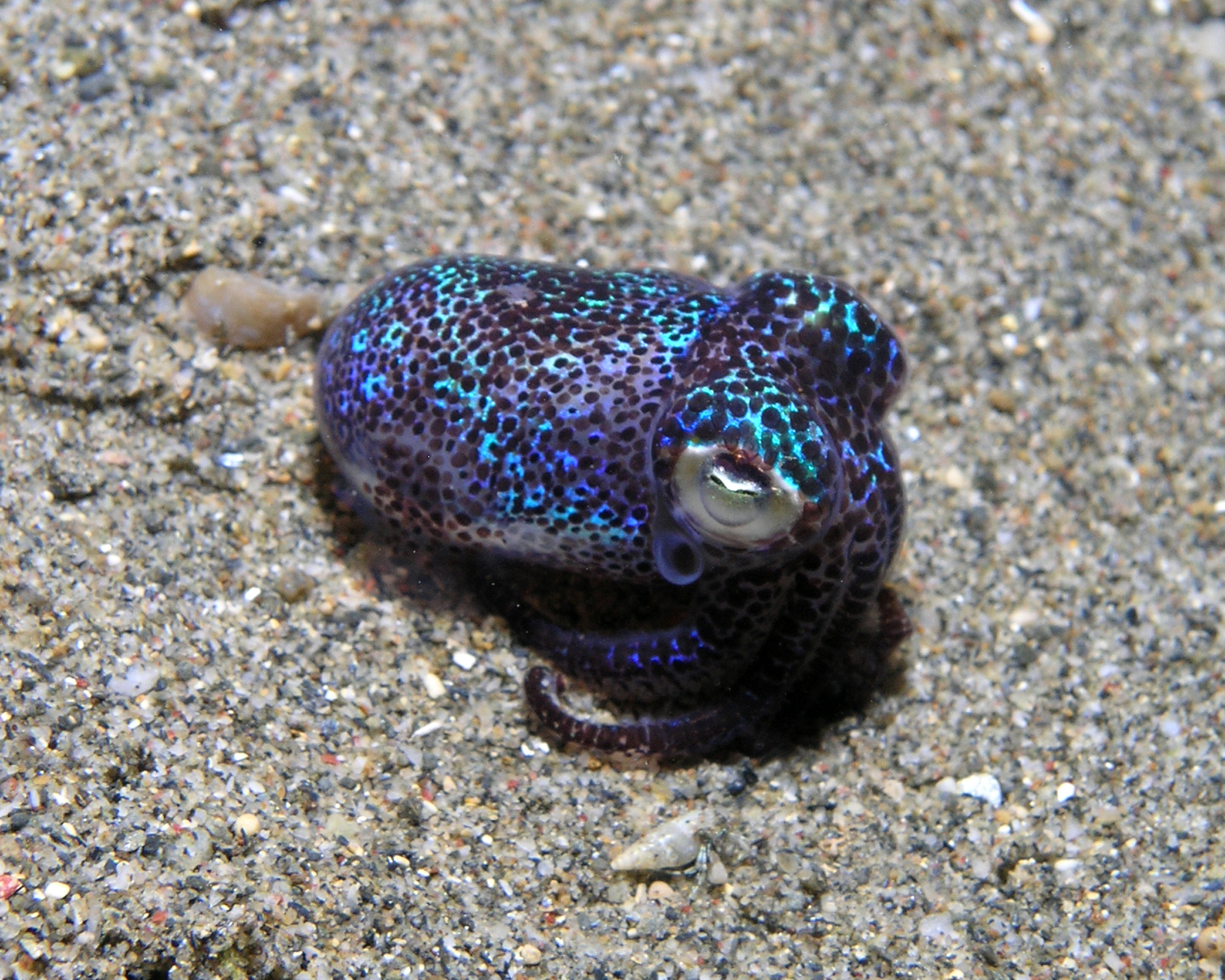
- Euprymna berryi

Scientific classification
- Kingdom: Animalia
- Phylum: Mollusca
- Class: Cephalopoda
- Order: Sepiolida
- Family: Sepiolidae
- Subfamily: Sepiolinae
- Genus: Euprymna; Steenstrup, 1887

Type species
- Inioteuthis morsei Verrill, 1881

Species
- See text.

Synonyms
- Fidenas J. E. Gray, 1849

= Euprymna =

Genus of molluscs

Euprymna is a genus of bobtail squid comprising a number of species.

== Species ==
- Euprymna albatrossae Voss, 1962
- Euprymna berryi Sasaki, 1929, double-ear bobtail
- Euprymna brenneri Sanchez et al., 2019
- Euprymna hoylei Adam, 1986
- Euprymna hyllebergi Nateewathana, 1997
- Euprymna megaspadicea Kubodera & Okutani, 2002
- Euprymna morsei (Verrill, 1881), Mimika bobtail
- Euprymna penares (Gray, 1849)
- Euprymna scolopes Berry, 1913, Hawaiian bobtail squid
- Euprymna stenodactyla (Grant, 1833)
- Euprymna tasmanica (Pfeffer, 1884), southern dumpling squid
