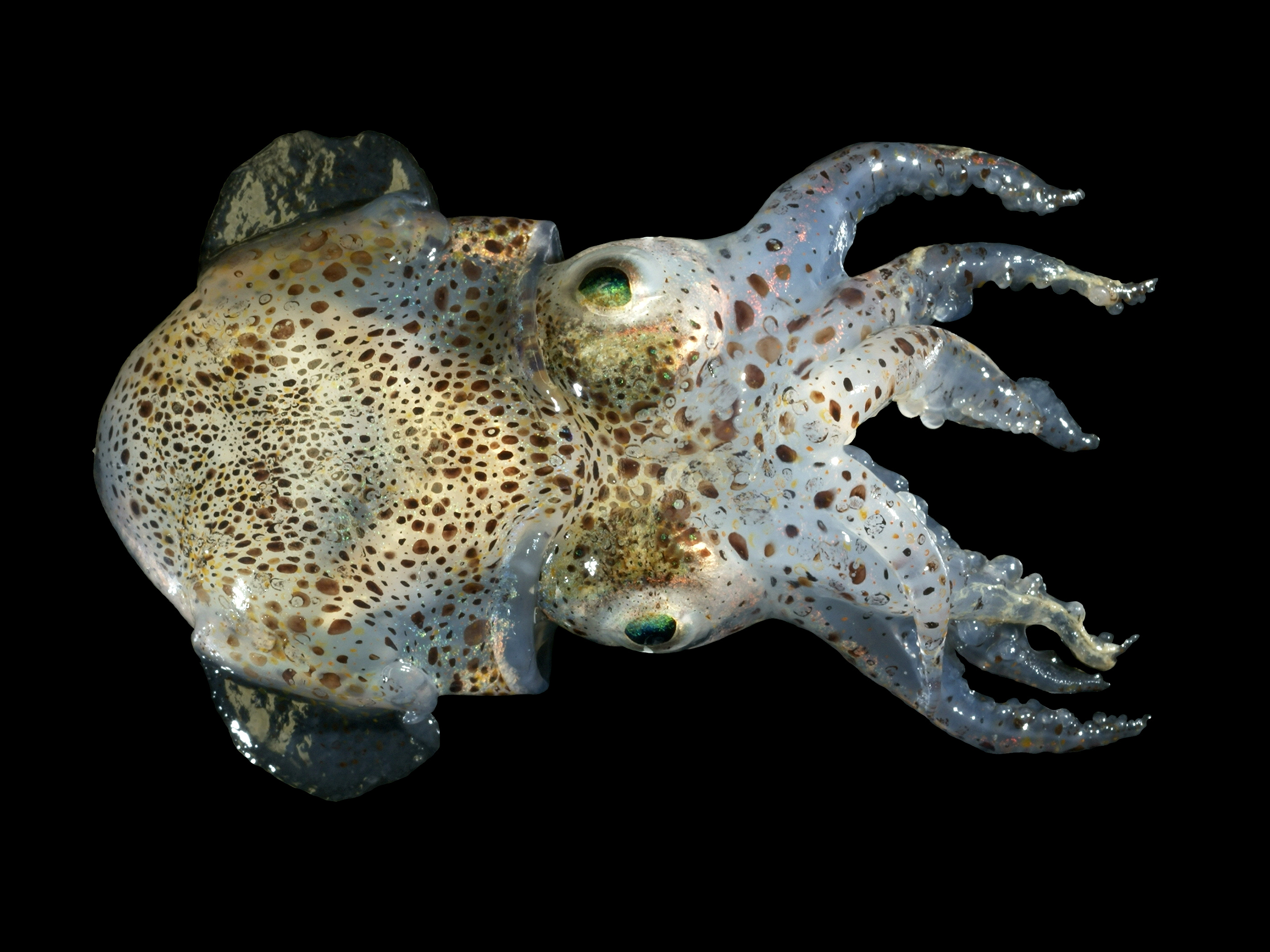
- Live specimen of Sepiola atlantica from the Belgian continental shelf.

Conservation status
- Data Deficient (IUCN 3.1)

Scientific classification
- Kingdom: Animalia
- Phylum: Mollusca
- Class: Cephalopoda
- Order: Sepiolida
- Family: Sepiolidae
- Subfamily: Sepiolinae
- Genus: Sepiola
- Species: S. atlantica

Binomial name
- Sepiola atlantica d'Orbigny in Ferussac & d'Orbigny, 1839–1841

Synonyms
- Heterosepiola atlantica (d'Orbigny [in Férussac & d'Orbigny], 1839–1842)

= Sepiola atlantica =

Species of mollusc

Sepiola atlantica, also known as the Atlantic bobtail, is a species of bobtail squid native to the north-eastern Atlantic Ocean and the Mediterranean Sea.

== Description ==
Sepiola atlantica has short fins which do not overlap the mantle margin either anteriorly or posteriorly. The four arms have two series of suckers close to the body and 4 to 8 rows of minute suckers toward their tips. The remaining arms have two rows of suckers. A hectocotylus is present, the left dorsal arm is modified, the near end has a fleshy pad which is formed from enlarged and fused sucker pedicels with the copulatory apparatus being a large swollen horn, which has secondary lobes at its base; the dorsal row of suckers which are placed tword the tip from the copulatory apparatus has 3 or 4 slightly enlarged suckers with swollen pedicels, 3 or 4 vestigial suckers, then 3 to 5 greatly enlarged suckers roughly halfway along arm. The hectocotylised arm is strongly bent towards its tip. The tentacular club has transverse rows of 8 suckers. There is a pair of kidney-shaped photophores within the mantle cavity, one on each side of the animal's ink sac. Both sexes of S. atlantica grow to around 21 mm (0.83 in) in mantle length.

== Distribution ==
Sepiola atlantica has a latitudinal range from 65ºN to 35ºN, ranging from Iceland, the Faroe Islands and western Norway in the north south to the Moroccan coast. There is a single record of this species from the Mediterranean Sea, a mature male caught in the Tyrrhenian Sea at a depth of 90m. The type specimen was collected in the Bay of Biscay and is deposited at the Muséum National d'Histoire Naturelle in Paris.

== Biology ==
Sepiola atlantica is a small species which occurs in a variety of marine habitats extending from shallow water to the upper slope of the continental shelf. It is a benthic species but it has been recorded from the water column during both day and night. Like many species in the family Sepiolidae, S. atlanticus possesses a light organ which may be used to countershade the animal. The mature males have a fleshy bulb and enlarged suckers on the distal end of the left first arm. In Firemore Bay, Loch Ewe, off the coast of Scotland spawning appears has been recorded as occurring throughput the year, peaking in April and again in July to August. Related species of bobtail squid are benthic animals that typically hide by burying themselves in soft substrates in daytime, and then at night they emerge to feed. The resident population of Firemore Bay has a variable age composition, further suggesting that this species has an extended reproductive season. At this site juveniles are recorded throughout the year, however recruitment of juveniles into the population shows peaks in April and July to August.

During mating, the male typically approaches the female, grasping the ventral region of the female's mantle while using the dorsal arm to transfer the spermatophores to the female's mantle cavity. Mating typically lasts from 68 to 80 minutes. During this time, the female may change in color or pattern, while the male's coloration generally stays constant.

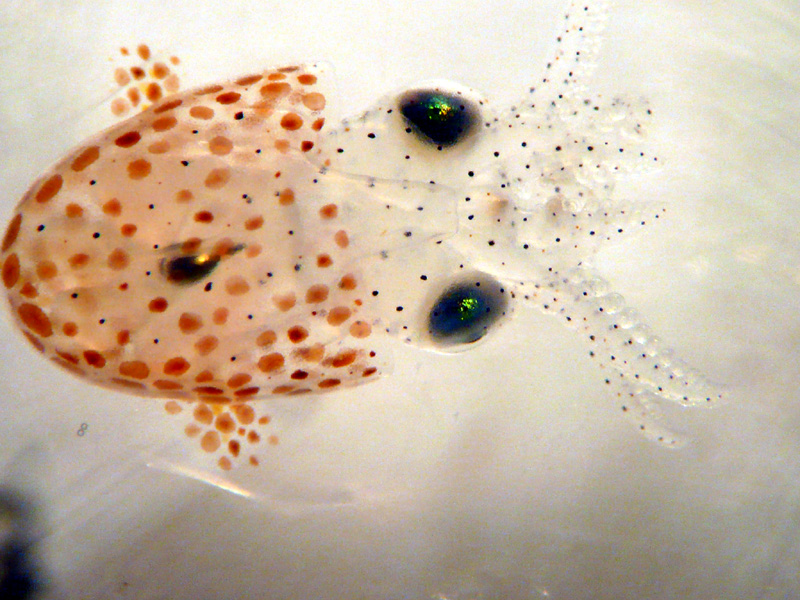
Hatchling

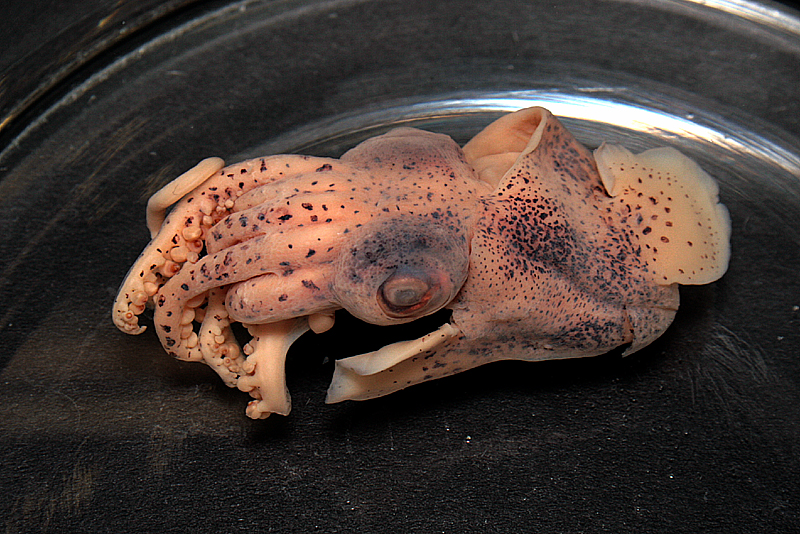
Preserved specimen

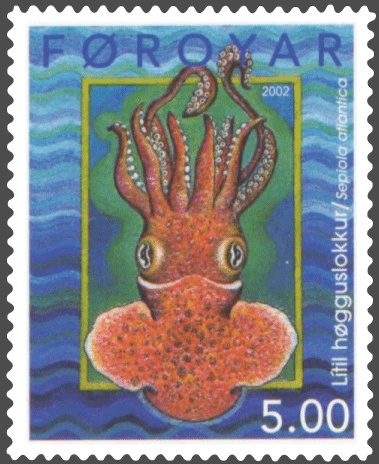
Sepiola atlantica appears on stamp FO 409 of the Faroe Islands
