= I. japonica =

I. japonica may refer to:

- Inioteuthis japonica, a bobtail squid species native to the western Pacific Ocean, specifically the waters off China, Taiwan and southern Japan
- Iris japonica, a plant species native of China

== See also ==
- Japonica (disambiguation)
