= Euprymna stenodactyla =

Conservation status
- Data Deficient (IUCN 3.1)

Scientific classification
- Kingdom: Animalia
- Phylum: Mollusca
- Class: Cephalopoda
- Order: Sepiolida
- Family: Sepiolidae
- Subfamily: Sepiolinae
- Genus: Euprymna
- Species: E. stenodactyla

Binomial name
- Euprymna stenodactyla (Grant, 1833)

Synonyms
- Sepiola stenodactyla Grant, 1833

Species of mollusc

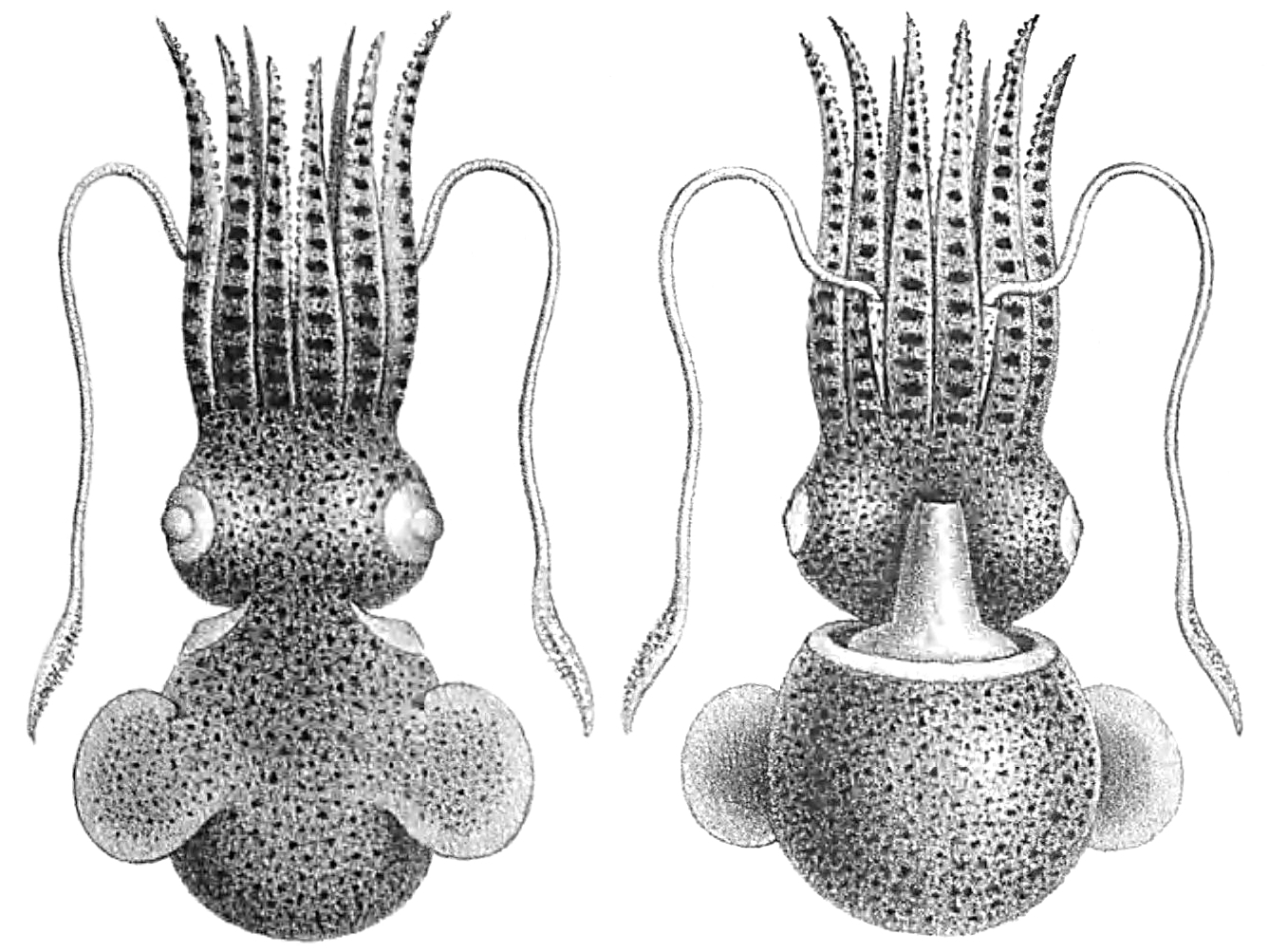
E. stenodactyla

Euprymna stenodactyla is a species of bobtail squid.

E. stenodactyla is native to the Indian Ocean. It is known with certainty only from Mauritius, although there exist doubtful records of this species from the Indo-west Pacific Ocean, from Mascarene Islands to Queensland, Australia and Polynesia.

The type specimen was collected off Mauritius. The type repository is unknown.
