= Choneteuthis tongaensis =

- Holotype of Choneteuthis tongaensis (33.8 mm ML)

Conservation status
- Data Deficient (IUCN 3.1)

Scientific classification
- Kingdom: Animalia
- Phylum: Mollusca
- Class: Cephalopoda
- Order: Sepiolida
- Family: Sepiolidae
- Genus: Choneteuthis
- Species: C. tongaensis

Binomial name
- Choneteuthis tongaensis Lu & Boucher-Rodoni, 2006

Species of mollusc

Choneteuthis tongaensis is a species of bobtail squid native to the waters around the Tonga Islands in the southern Pacific Ocean. It is known from only three specimens. Of these, the holotype is the largest, at 33.8 mm mantle length (ML). C. tongaensis is characterised by several distinct morphological features: the mantle is free from the head in the nuchal region, a large, circular visceral photophore and ventral shield are present on the ventral surface of the ink sac, and the broad keel extends the full length of the club.

The holotype (MNHN 3820), a female with missing tentacles, was collected in the N Ha’apai group of the Tonga Islands (19°42′S 174°26′W) at a depth of 332 m. Paratype 1, a male known from only the head and brachial crown, came from the same station. Paratype 2 (MNHN 3822), also a female with missing tentacles, was collected from a seamount in the Tonga Islands (22°11′S 175°27′W) at a depth of 385–405 m.
