= S. aurantiaca =

S. aurantiaca may refer to:

- Sandersonia aurantiaca, the Christmas bell, golden lily of the valley or Chinese lantern lily, a perennial plant species native to South Africa
- Schinia aurantiaca, a moth species found in North America
- Sepiola aurantiaca, the golden bobtail, a squid species native to the northeastern Atlantic Ocean
- Stigmatella aurantiaca, a myxobacterium species

== See also ==
- Aurantiaca
