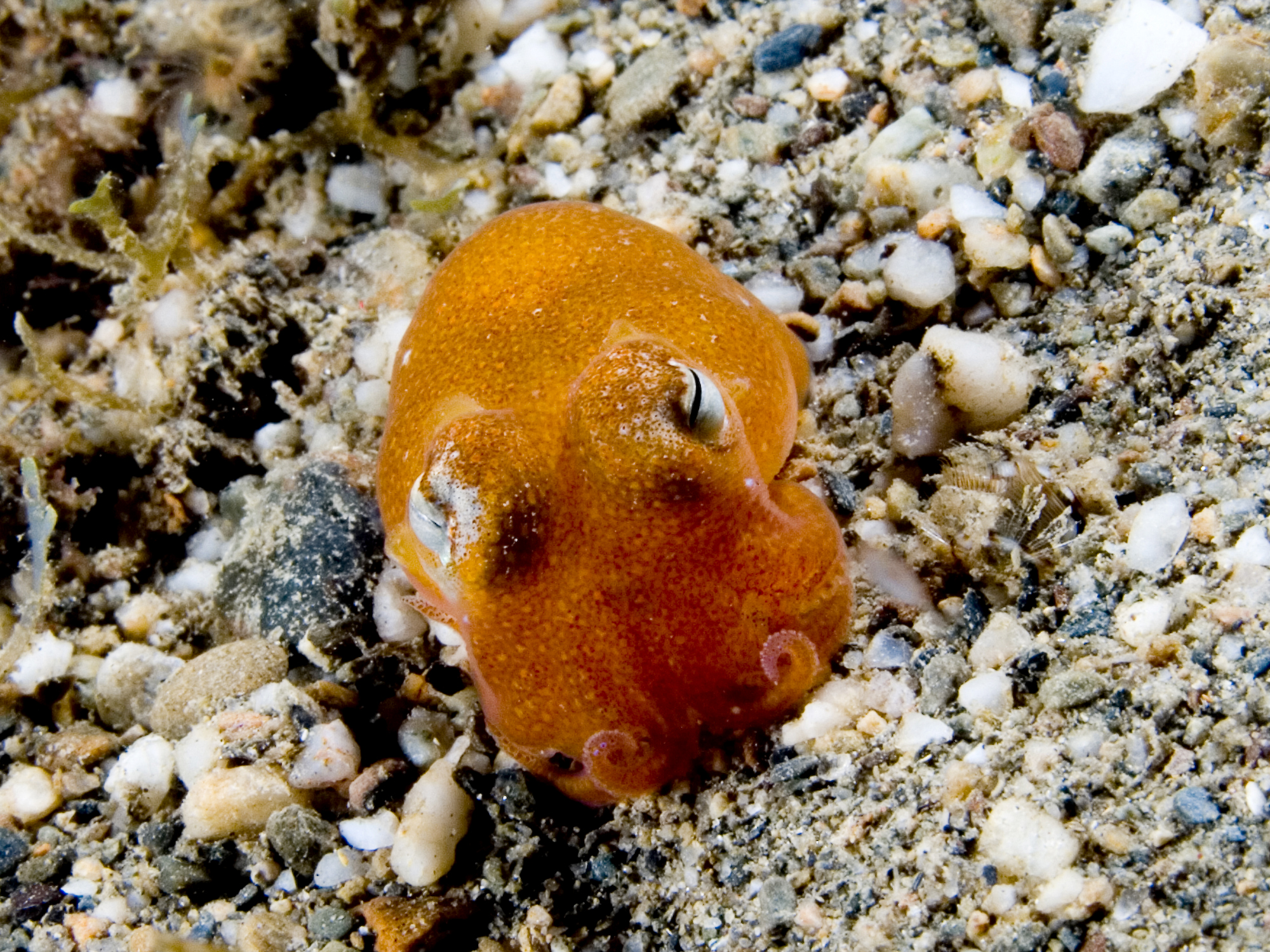
- Euprymna scolopes

Scientific classification
- Kingdom: Animalia
- Phylum: Mollusca
- Class: Cephalopoda
- Order: Sepiolida
- Family: Sepiolidae
- Subfamily: Sepiolinae; Leach, 1817

Genera
- Adinaefiola; Amutatiola; Boletzkyola; Dextrasepiola; Eumandya; Euprymna; Inioteuthis; Lusepiola; Rondeletiola; Sepietta; Sepiola

= Sepiolinae =

Subfamily of molluscs

Sepiolinae is a subfamily of bobtail squid encompassing 11 genera and 38 species.

== Classification ==
- Subfamily Sepiolinae
  - Genus Adinaefiola
    - Adinaefiola ligulata
    - Adinaefiola pfefferi
  - Genus Amutatiola
    - Amutatiola macroventosa
  - Genus Boletzkyola
    - Boletzkyola knudseni
  - Genus Dextrasepiola
    - Dextrasepiola taenia
  - Genus Eumandya
    - Eumandya pardalota
    - Eumandya parva
    - Eumandya phenax
  - Genus Euprymna
    - Euprymna albatrossae
    - Euprymna berryi, double-ear bobtail
    - Euprymna brenneri
    - Euprymna hoylei
    - Euprymna hyllebergi
    - Euprymna megaspadicea
    - Euprymna morsei, Mimika bobtail
    - Euprymna penares
    - Euprymna scolopes, Hawaiian bobtail squid
    - Euprymna stenodactyla
    - Euprymna tasmanica, southern dumpling squid
  - Genus Inioteuthis
    - Inioteuthis japonica
    - Inioteuthis maculosa
  - Genus Lusepiola
    - Lusepiola birostrata
    - Lusepiola trirostrata
  - Genus Rondeletiola
    - Rondeletiola capensis
    - Rondeletiola minor, lentil bobtail
  - Genus Sepietta
    - Sepietta neglecta, elegant bobtail
    - Sepietta obscura
    - Sepietta oweniana, common bobtail
  - Genus Sepiola
    - Sepiola affinis, anagolous bobtail
    - Sepiola atlantica, Atlantic bobtail
    - Sepiola boletzkyi,
    - Sepiola bursadhaesa
    - Sepiola intermedia, intermediate bobtail
    - Sepiola robusta, robust bobtail
    - Sepiola rondeleti, dwarf bobtail
    - Sepiola rossiaeformis
    - Sepiola steenstrupiana, Steenstrup's bobtail
    - Sepiola tridens
