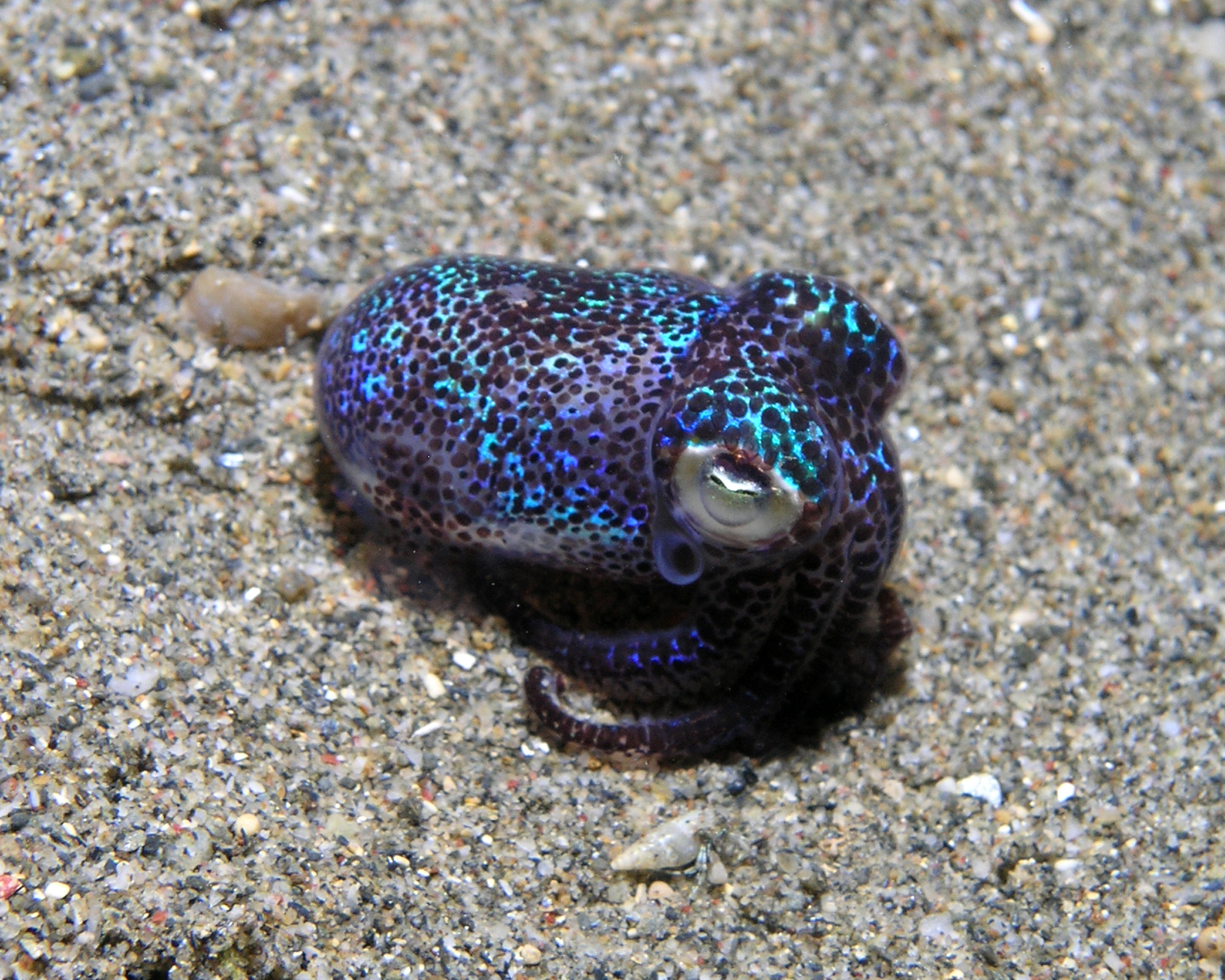

Conservation status
- Data Deficient (IUCN 3.1)

Scientific classification
- Kingdom: Animalia
- Phylum: Mollusca
- Class: Cephalopoda
- Order: Sepiolida
- Family: Sepiolidae
- Subfamily: Sepiolinae
- Genus: Euprymna
- Species: E. berryi

Binomial name
- Euprymna berryi Sasaki, 1929

= Euprymna berryi =

Species of mollusc

Euprymna berryi, commonly called hummingbird bobtail squid or Berry's bobtail squid among various other vernacular names, is a species of mollusc cephalopod in the family Sepiolidae.

== Description ==
The hummingbird bobtail squid is a small sized bobtail squid. Its size varies according to the sex; males are no bigger than 3 centimetres (1.2 in) while the female reaches 5 centimetres (2.0 in) length. The global body aspect is compact and rounded. It possesses eight arms and two tentacles, a pair of small lateral fins on the posterior part of the mantle. The background color of the body is translucent with a large number of tiny dark chromatophores. The chromatophores are widely distributed over all of the body including the arms, head, ventral and dorsal areas of the mantle, except the tentacles and the pair of lateral fins of which only the border with the mantle has chromatophores. The external color of the animal, as we see it, is like a blend of small dark, electric blue and green dots.

== Distribution & habitat ==
The hummingbird bobtail squid is widespread throughout the tropical waters of the central Indo-Pacific area from Indonesia to the Philippines. It is also possible that a larger distribution could reach the Andaman Islands, Sri Lanka and the western coast of India (some specimens were collected by scientists in 200-/2007). Euprymna berryi occupies the benthic layer, as it prefers sandy or fine sediments seafloors in which it can easily bury itself in case of danger or to rest in during the day.

== Biology ==
The hummingbird bobtail squid demonstrates nocturnal activity, and during daytime it usually stays buried in its preferred substrate. To hunt its prey at night, it uses a bioluminescent organ located in the gill cavity which just emits enough light not to reveal its silhouette to potential predators. It feeds on mainly small benthic crustaceans.
