= Jean Baptiste Louis d'Audibert de Férussac =

French naturalist and geologist

Baron Jean Baptiste Louis d'Audibert de Férussac (or d'Audebard, or d'Audebert) (1745–1815) was a French naturalist and geologist.

Jean Baptiste Audibert de Férussac was born in Saint-Pierre-de-Clairac, the son of Joseph d'Audebard de Férussac (1676–1753), Seigneur de Jouatas, and Marie Anne du Lion de Gasque, and was educated at the military school. An artillery officer, he reached the rank of lieutenant-colonel before returning to France in 1808. He was a Chevalier of the Order of Saint Louis, and a member of the Société des sciences et arts de Montauban.

He was the author of many scientific papers on molluscs, and began a monumental work, the Histoire naturelle des Mollusques, which took 30 years of study and remained incomplete and unpublished at his death. The work was continued by his son André Étienne, also a distinguished student of molluscs, who began publishing it in parts in 1819.
