= Adolf Naef =

Swiss scientist (1883–1949)

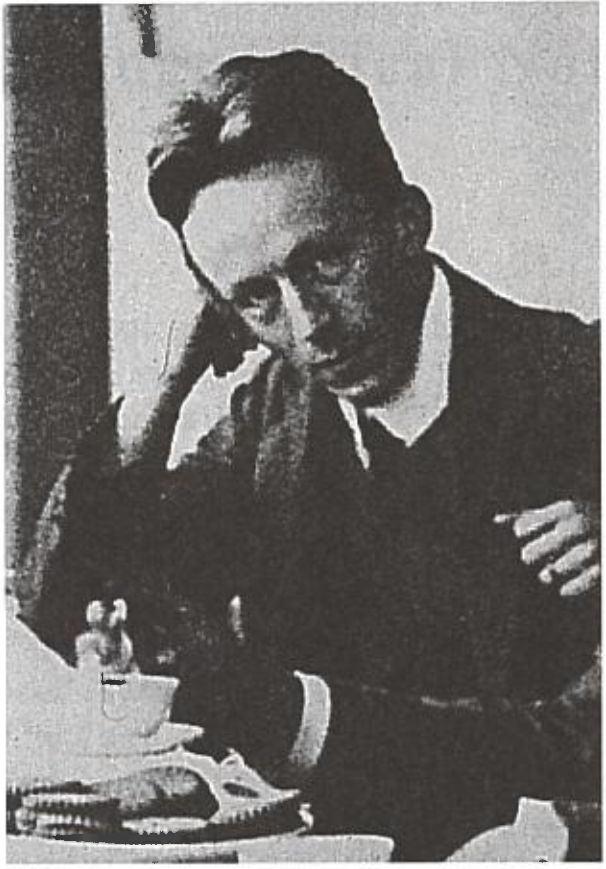
- Naef in 1910
- Born: 1 May 1883; Herisau, Switzerland
- Died: 11 May 1949 (aged 66); Zurich, Switzerland
- Scientific career
- Fields: Zoology, Paleontology
- Institutions: University of Zurich, Naples Zoological Station, Cairo University

Adolf Naef (1 May 1883 – 11 May 1949) was a Swiss zoologist and palaeontologist who worked on cephalopods and systematics. Although he struggled with academic politics throughout his career and difficult conditions during World War I and II, his work had lasting influences on the fields of phylogenetics, morphology, and embryology.

== Life ==
Naef was born in Herisau, Switzerland, to parents Martin and Berta. In 1904, he began studying philosophy and literature at the University of Zurich, but soon switched to natural sciences. He graduated in 1908 and went on to pursue a PhD under the guidance of Arnold Lang (1855–1914), a former professor of Jena University and close friend of Ernst Haeckel as well as a long-time associate of Anton Dohrn.

Naef visited Dohrn's Zoological Station in Naples, Italy in 1908. Although initially planning to collect eggs from a variety of animals, he ended up studying the embryology of the squid Loligo vulgaris. He published his dissertation one year later.

In 1910, Naef accepted a position of a permanent visiting scientist at the Zoological Station, where he began work on a cephalopod monograph that had been started by Giuseppe Jatta. He took a concurrent teaching position at the University of Zurich, working remotely from Naples. During World War I, conditions in Italy deteriorated until finally Naef decided to return to Zurich.

After finding a professorship at the University of Zagreb in 1922, Naef shifted the primary focus of his work to vertebrates. Nevertheless, he returned to the Naples Zoological Station in 1926 to complete his cephalopod monograph, which was published in two parts in the Station's Fauna und Flora des Golfes von Neapel und der Angrenzenden Meers-Abschitte (Fauna e Flora del Golfo di Napoli) series, which formed the basis for his two short but significant monographs on systematic theory.

In 1927 Naef became Professor of Zoology at the University of Cairo, and in 1929 Director of the Zoological Department. He expected this position to be a temporary one until he could find a job at a European university. In fact, in 1931 Naef was nearly hired as chair of zoology at the University of Basle, but the position was given to Adolf Portmann instead. Naef remained at Cairo for the rest of his career. He planned a comprehensive Textbook of Vertebrate Zoology, but his work on the project was stifled by isolating governmental regulations during World War II.

After the war, Naef attempted to continue with his publications. Soon, however, he developed pancreatic cancer. He returned to Zurich in 1949 and died on May 11; few obituaries were published.

Naef was married three times: first, to Elisabeth Rosenbaum on March 30, 1907. Their daughter Gerda was born on December 25 of the same year. In 1909, Elisabeth began studying medicine at the University of Zurich; she and Naef divorced in 1910. Naef's second marriage, begun soon afterward, also ended in divorce, in 1915. In 1917 he met his third wife, Maria Bendiner, and although they would not marry until 1924, this marriage lasted until Naef's death. The couple had two daughters.

== Systematics ==
Along with his mentors and peers, Naef readily accepted Darwin's theory of descent with modification, and embraced the challenge of understanding evolutionary relationships among organisms. He argued that direct morphological observations form the necessary basis for systematics. Naef described his approach as Systematische Morphologie, the details of which he sketched out as early as 1913:

"Phylogenetic and natural systematics deal with the same factual material, and although each has different basic concepts, both disciplines can be united in a single concept because their objects are so similar. I have therefore proposed the name 'systematic morphology' for this concept ... It is intended to show that there is an inner relationship between natural systematics and (comparative) morphology.”

Naef's concern was with the discovery of natural, as opposed to artificial, classification, a problem examined in detail by A. P. de Candolle. Naef expressed it so:

"For decades, phylogenetics lacked a valid methodological basis and developed on the decayed trunk of a withering tradition rooted in the idealistic morphology and the systematics of pre-Darwinian times. There was talk of systematic 'tact' and morphological 'instinct', terms which were felt rather than understood and consequently insufficient to form the frame of a science which required sound definitions and clearly formulated principles."

And thus was born Systematische Morphologie, perhaps the beginnings of cladistics, in its most general form. Towards the end of his career, Naef published several detailed accounts of Systematische Morphologie, including a succinct summary in the widely read 2nd edition of the Handwörterbuch der Naturwissenschaften. This work strongly influenced Willi Hennig, who developed a similar philosophy but disagreed with Naef on the primacy of direct observation in favor of pursuing the metaphysical "true nature" of phylogenetics.

== Cephalopods ==
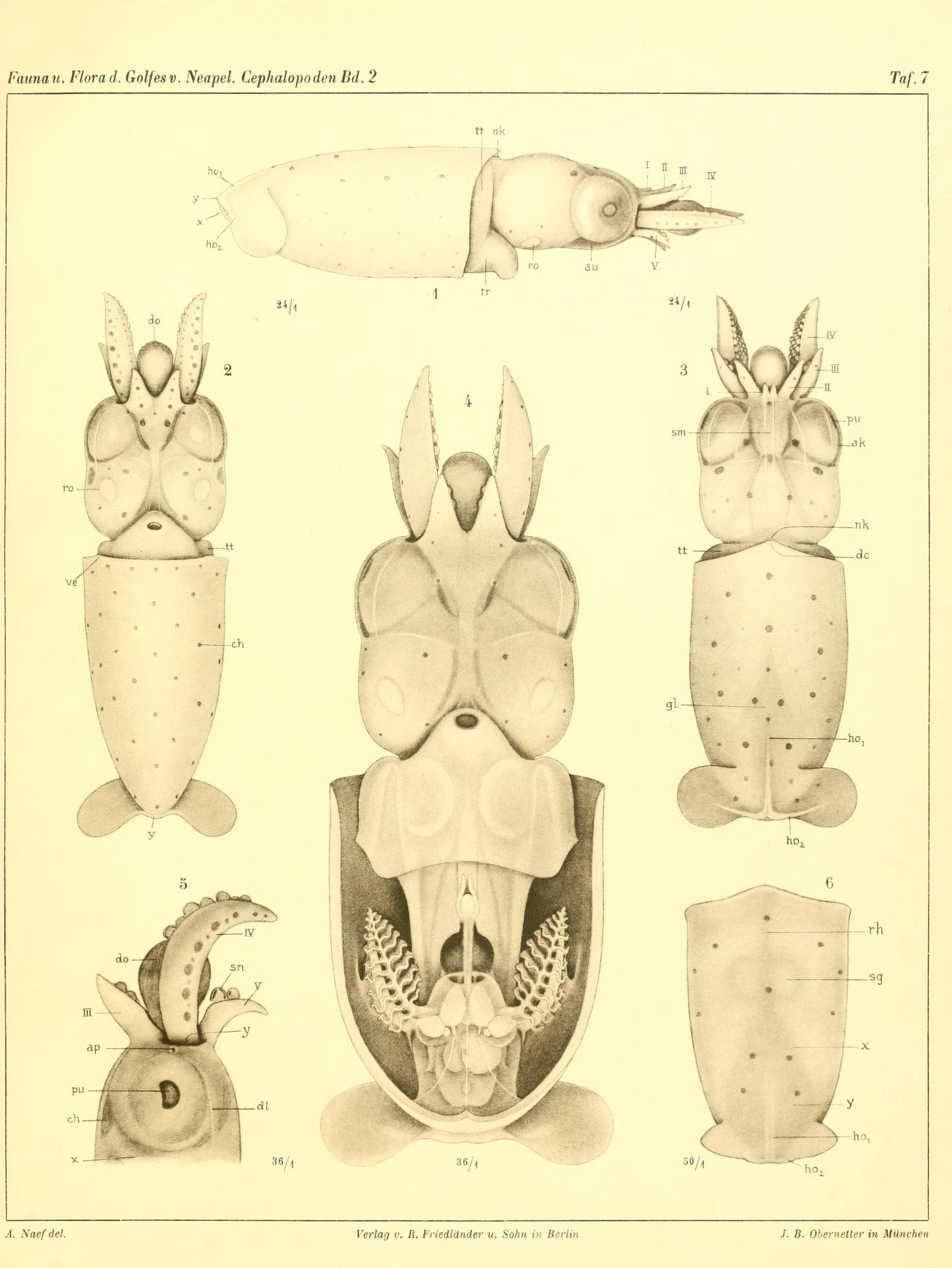
Anatomy of embryonic Loligo squid from Adolf Naef's Die Cephalopoden, 1921

It was Naef's abiding fascination with evolution and systematics that brought him to the study of cephalopods. Invited by Dohrn to complete a cephalopod monograph, he took this project as an opportunity to put his own systematic theories into practice.

He aimed to construct the first complete phylogeny for any single group, a purpose that cephalopods served well. This group contains relatively few species (compared to, say, gastropods) spanning relatively high morphological diversity—ideal material for the systematist. Naef also found that cephalopod embryology and paleontology were quite amenable to study.

Although Naef professed no "special interest" in cephalopods, his work significantly advanced scientific knowledge of the group and he maintained a connection to cephalopod studies throughout his career. He described dozens of new species, genera and families—both living and fossil—and created the first chart of cephalopod embryonic stages, which is still in use today.

Naef's hypotheses about cephalopod evolution continue to inform contemporary research. He found evidence for fins on belemnites almost a hundred years before their existence was finally proven, and he was the first to propose that modern squids evolved directly from belemnites. After a period of skepticism, this idea has recently been gathering traction. Naef's suggestion that argonauts could have evolved from ammonoids, however, has been refuted.

In 1930, the extinct spirulid genus Naefia was named in his honor by paleontologist Walter Wetzel.

== Works ==
- Naef, A. (1909). Die Organogenese des Cölomsystems und der zentralen Blutgefässe von Loligo. Jenaische Zeitschrift für Naturwissenschaft, 45, N.F. 38:221—266.
- Naef, A. (1909). Die Organogenese des Cölomsystems und der zentralen Blutgefässe von Loligo. Inaugural-Dissertation, Univers. Zurich, 46pp.
- Naef, A. (1917). Die individuelle Entwicklung organischer Formen als Urkunde ihrer Stammesgeschichte: (Kritische Betrachtungen über das sogenannte “biogenetische Grundgesetz”). Verlag von Gustav Fischer, Jena.
- Naef, A. (1919). Idealistische Morphologie und Phylogenetik (zur Methodik der systematischen). Verlag von Gustav Fischer, Jena.
- Naef, A. (1972). Cephalopoda. Fauna and Flora of the Bay of Naples (Fauna und Flora des Golfes von Neapel und der Angrenzenden Meers-Abschitte), Monograph 35, Part I, [Vol. I], Fascicle I. Smithsonian Institution Libraries, Washington.
- Naef, A. (2000). Cephalopoda. Embryology. Fauna and Flora of the Bay of Naples [Fauna und Flora des Golfes von Naepel]. Monograph 35. Part I, Vol. II [Final part of the Monograph No. 35], pp. 3–461. Washington, Smithsonian.
