= André Étienne d'Audebert de Férussac =

French naturalist

Baron André Étienne Justin Pascal Joseph François d'Audebert de Férussac (30 December 1786 – 21 January 1836) was a French naturalist best known for his studies of molluscs. (Two of his given names are sometimes spelt Just or Juste instead of Justin, and d'Audibert, d'Audebard, or d'Audeberd instead of "d'Audebert".)

He was born in Chartron, near Lauzerte in the province of Quercy (now in Tarn-et-Garonne), the son of Jean Baptiste Louis d'Audibert de Férussac and Marie Catherine Josèphe de Rozet, and was professor of geography and statistics at the École d'état-major in Paris.

== Taxa ==
Férussac named and described numerous taxa of gastropods, including:

- Cochlodina Férussac, 1821, a land snail genus
- Helicostyla Férussac, 1821, a land snail genus

Various other taxa were named in honor of him, including:

- Ferussaciidae Bourguignat, 1883, a land snail family

== Works ==
Férussac's works include:

- Férussac A. E. J. P. J. F. d'Audebard de 1821–1822. Tableaux systématiques des animaux mollusques classés en familles naturelles, dans lesquels on a établi la concordance de tous les systèmes; suivis d'un prodrome général pour tous les mollusques terrestres ou fluviatiles, vivants ou fossiles. pp. j–xlvij [= 1–47], [1], 1–110, [1]. Paris, Londres. (Bertrand, Sowerby).
- The first 28 parts of Histoire naturelle générale et particulière des mollusques terrestres et fluviatiles, on land and freshwater molluscs (4 volumes, 1819–1832), originally begun by his father and later completed by Gérard Paul Deshayes.
- The introduction and first 11 parts of Histoire naturelle générale et particulière des céphalopodes acétabulifères (Paris, 1834–5), later revised and completed by d'Orbigny.

He was also, from 1822, the editor of the Bulletin général et universel des annonces et des nouvelles scientifiques.

== Bibliography ==
- Bru, B. and T. Martin (2005) Le baron de Ferussac, la couleur de la statistique et la topologie des sciences, Journ@l Electronique d'Histoire des Probabilités et de la Statistique, 1 (2).
- Winckworth, R. (1941) in Proceedings of the Malacological Society, pp. 34–6.
