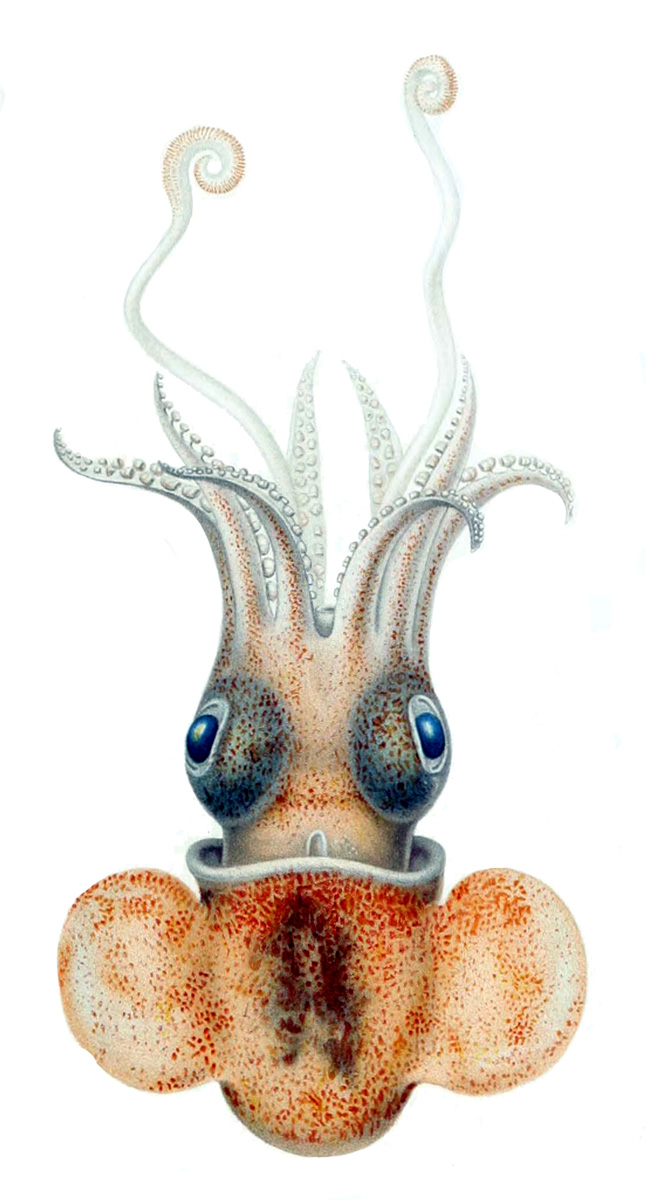
- Austrorossia mastigophora

Scientific classification
- Kingdom: Animalia
- Phylum: Mollusca
- Class: Cephalopoda
- Order: Sepiolida
- Superfamily: Sepioloidea
- Family: Sepiolidae; Leach, 1817

Subfamilies and genera
- Heteroteuthinae; Amphorateuthis; Heteroteuthis; Iridoteuthis; Nectoteuthis; Sepiolina; Stoloteuthis; Rossiinae; Austrorossia; Neorossia; Rossia; Semirossia; Sepiolinae; Adinaefiola; Amutatiola; Boletzkyola; Dextrasepiola; Eumandya; Euprymna; Inioteuthis; Lusepiola; Rondeletiola; Sepietta; Sepiola; Incertae sedis; Choneteuthis

= Sepiolidae =

Family of molluscs

Sepiolidae is a family of bobtail squid encompassing 22 genera in three or four subfamilies. A gladius is absent in subfamily Heteroteuthidinae, and in subfamily Sepiolinae it is reduced, or absent like in genus Euprymna. A third subfamily is Rossiinae, and the genus Choneteuthis is considered to be incertae sedis. Though 79 species have been recognized in the family Sepiolidae, the validity of a few of them has been questioned.
