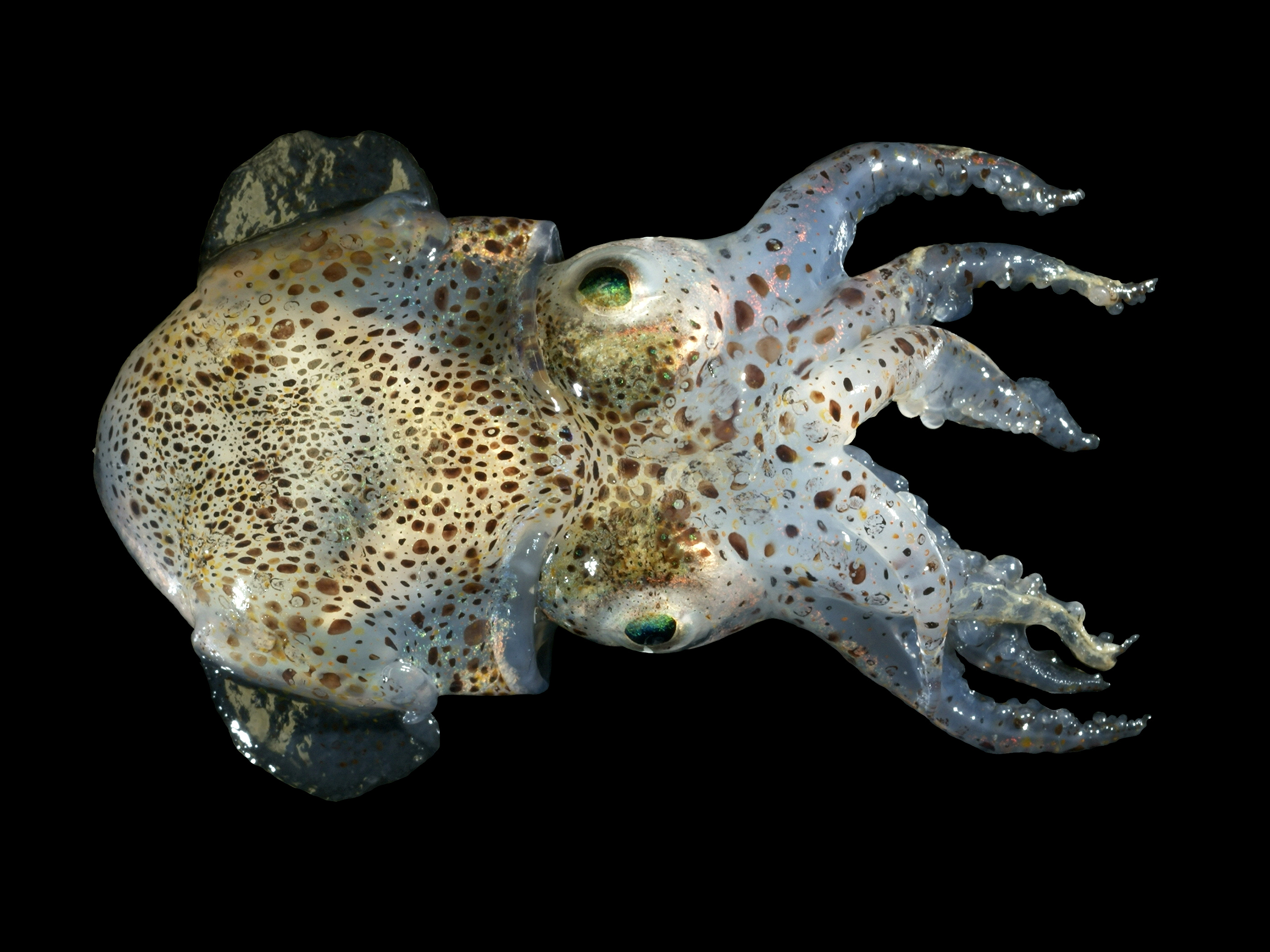
- Sepiola atlantica

Scientific classification
- Kingdom: Animalia
- Phylum: Mollusca
- Class: Cephalopoda
- Order: Sepiolida; Fioroni, 1981
- Superfamily: Sepioloidea; W.E. Leach, 1817

Families
- Families: Sepiadariidae P. Fischer, 1882; Sepiolidae Leach, 1817

Synonyms
- Sepiolina

= Bobtail squid =

Order cephalopod molluscs closely related to cuttlefish

Bobtail squid are cephalopods belonging to the monotypic superfamily Sepioloidea of the order Sepiolida. Bobtail squid tend to have a rounder mantle than the similar-looking cuttlefish and have no cuttlebone. They have eight suckered arms and two tentacles and are generally quite small (typical male mantle length being between 1 and 8 cm (0.39 and 3.15 in)).

Sepiolids live in shallow coastal waters of the Pacific Ocean and some parts of the Indian Ocean and Atlantic Ocean as well as in shallow waters on the west coast of the Cape Peninsula off South Africa. Like cuttlefish, they can swim by either using the fins on their mantle or by jet propulsion. They are also known as "dumpling squid" (owing to their rounded mantle), "stubby squid", or "bottletail squid".

== Light organ ==
Light from the light organ of a bobtail squid obscures its silhouette

Bobtail squid have a symbiotic relationship with bioluminescent bacteria (Aliivibrio fischeri), which inhabit a special light organ in the squid's mantle. The luminescent properties of the bacteria regulate gene expression in the light organ. The bacteria are fed a sugar and amino acid solution by the squid and in return hide the squid's silhouette when viewed from below by matching the amount of light hitting the top of the mantle. This method of counter-illumination is an example of animal camouflage.

The organ contains filters which may alter the wavelength of luminescence closer to that of downwelling moonlight and starlight; a lens with biochemical similarities to the squid's eye to diffuse the bacterial luminescence; and a reflector which directs the light ventrally.

== Reproduction ==
Sepiolida are iteroparous and a female might lay several clutches, each of 1–400 eggs (dependent on species), over her estimated one-year-long lifetime. The eggs are covered with sand and left without parental care. Symbiosis with A. fischeri from the surrounding seawater is initiated immediately upon hatching, and the bacteria's colonisation of the juvenile light-organ induces morphological changes in the squid that lead to maturity.

== Classification ==
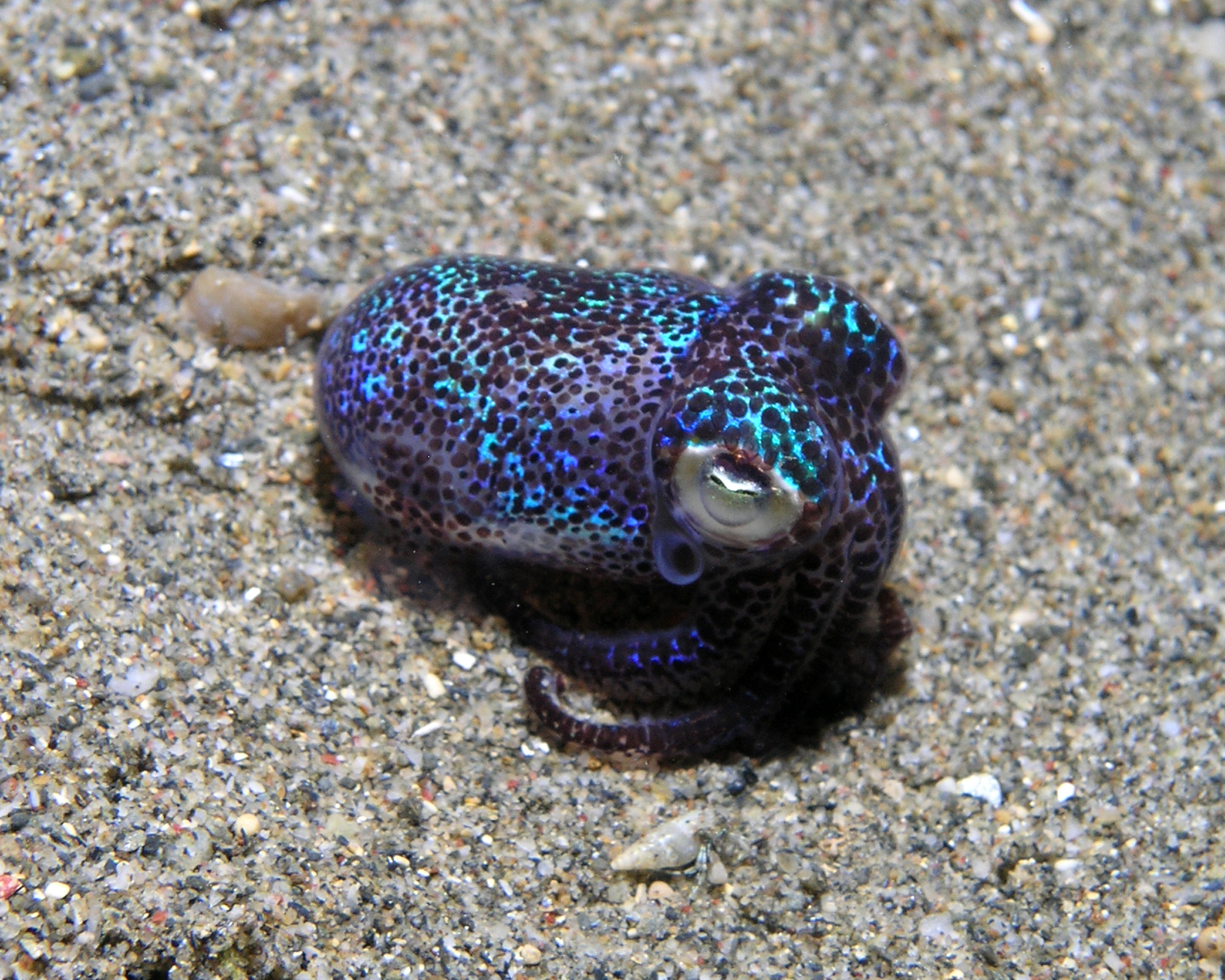
Euprymna berryi from East Timor

About seventy species are known. Sepiolid taxonomy within the coleoid cephalopods is currently controversial, thus their position is subject to future change. Extant taxa only:

- Class Cephalopoda
  - Subclass Nautiloidea: nautilus
  - Subclass Coleoidea: squid, octopus, cuttlefish
    - Superorder Decapodiformes
      - Order Bathyteuthida
      - Order Idiosepida: pygmy squids
      - Order Myopsida
      - Order Oegopsida
      - Order Sepiida: cuttlefish
      - Order Sepiolida: bobtail squid
        - Superfamily Sepioloidea
          - Family Sepiadariidae
          - Family Sepiolidae
      - Order Spirulida: ram's horn squid
    - Superorder Octopodiformes: octopus, vampire squid
