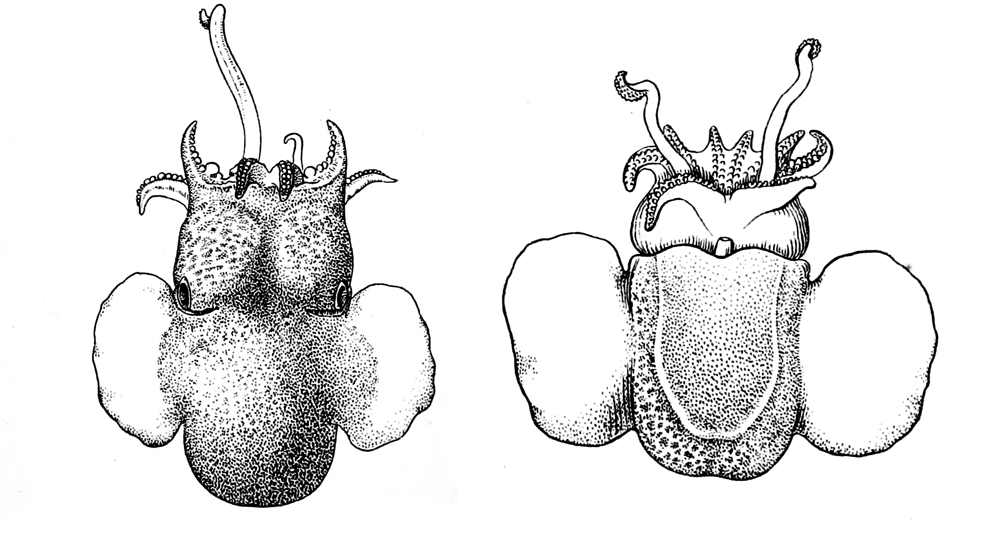
- Stoloteuthis leucoptera

Scientific classification
- Kingdom: Animalia
- Phylum: Mollusca
- Class: Cephalopoda
- Order: Sepiolida
- Family: Sepiolidae
- Subfamily: Heteroteuthidinae; Appellöf, 1898

Genera
- Amphorateuthis; Heteroteuthis; Iridoteuthis; Nectoteuthis; Sepiolina; Stoloteuthis

= Heteroteuthidinae =

Subfamily of molluscs

Heteroteuthidinae is a subfamily of bobtail squid encompassing six genera and 19 recognized species. Unlike the other two subfamilies in the family Sepiolidae, they are pelagic as adults.

== Classification ==
- Subfamily Heteroteuthinae
  - Genus Amphorateuthis
    - Amphorateuthis alveatus
  - Genus Heteroteuthis
    - Heteroteuthis atlantis
    - Heteroteuthis dagamensis
    - Heteroteuthis dispar, odd bobtail
    - Heteroteuthis hawaiiensis
    - Heteroteuthis nordopacifica
    - Heteroteuthis ryukyuensis
    - Heteroteuthis serventyi
  - Genus Iridoteuthis
    - Iridoteuthis iris
    - Iridoteuthis lophia
    - Iridoteuthis merlini
  - Genus Nectoteuthis
    - Nectoteuthis pourtalesi
  - Genus Sepiolina
    - Sepiolina nipponensis, Japanese bobtail
    - Sepiolina petasus
  - Genus Stoloteuthis
    - Stoloteuthis cthulhui
    - Stoloteuthis japonica
    - Stoloteuthis leucoptera, butterfly bobtail squid
    - Stoloteuthis maoria
    - Stoloteuthis weberi
