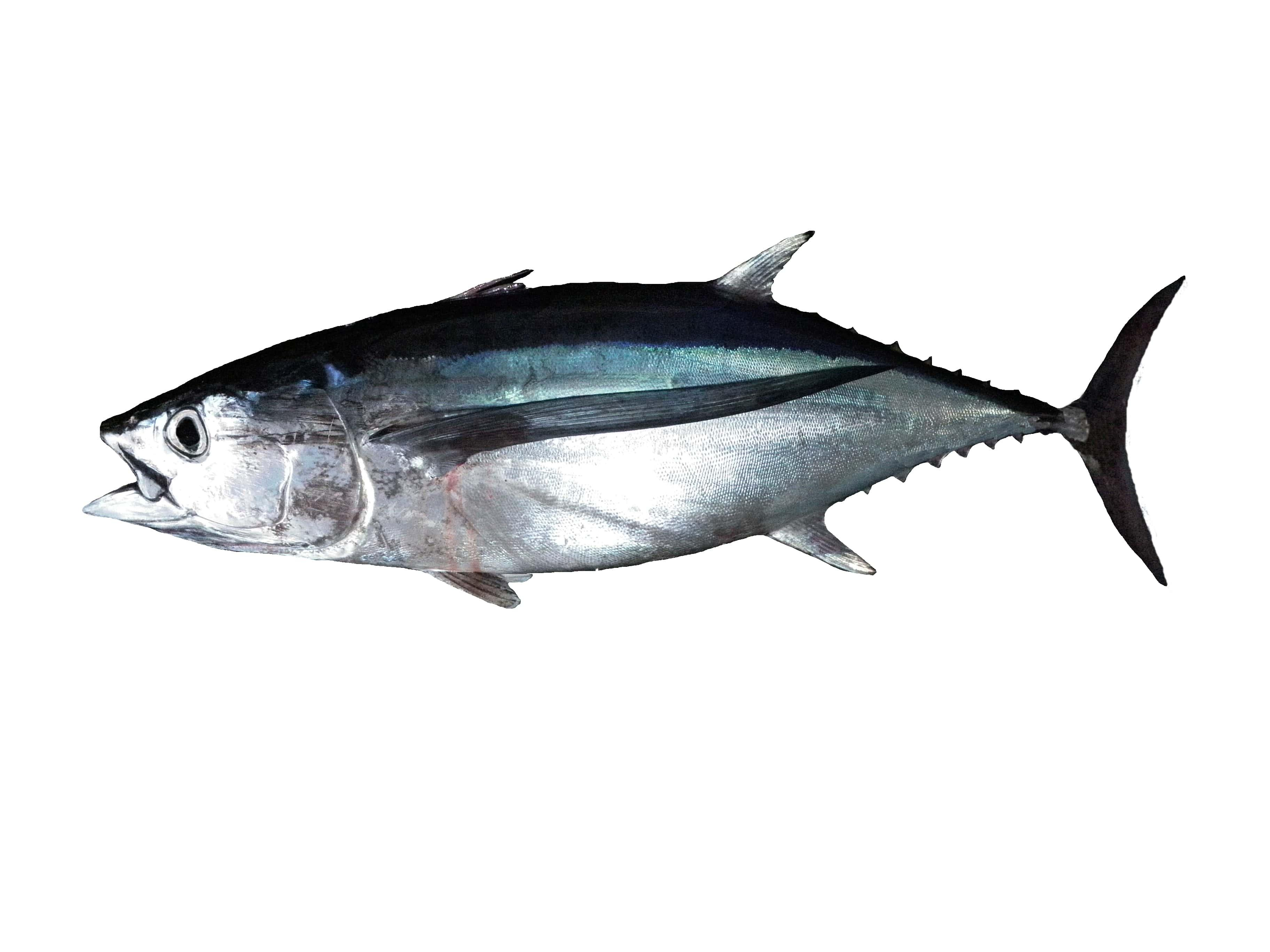

Conservation status
- Least Concern (IUCN 3.1)

Scientific classification
- Kingdom: Animalia
- Phylum: Chordata
- Class: Actinopterygii
- Division: Teleostei
- Order: Scombriformes
- Family: Scombridae
- Genus: Thunnus
- Subgenus: Thunnus
- Species: T. alalunga

Binomial name
- Thunnus alalunga (Bonnaterre, 1788)

Synonyms
- List: Scomber alalunga Bonnaterre, 1788; Germo alalunga (Bonnaterre, 1788); Thynnus alalunga (Bonnaterre, 1788); Scomber alalunga Cetti, 1777; Thunnus alalunga (Cetti, 1777); Scomber alatunga Gmelin, 1789; Orcynus alatunga (Gmelin, 1789); Scomber albicans Walbaum, 1792; Scomber germon Lacépède, 1800; Germo germon (Lacepède, 1800); Orcynus germon (Lacepède, 1800); Orcynus germo (Lacepède, 1800); Scomber germo Lacepède, 1801; Germo germo (Lacepède, 1800); Thunnus germo (Lacepède, 1800); Thynnus pacificus Cuvier, 1832; Thunnus pacificus (Cuvier, 1832); Scomber germo Bennett, 1840; Orcynus pacificus Cooper, 1863

= Albacore =

Species of tuna

The albacore (Thunnus alalunga), known also as the albicore or longfin tuna, is a species of tuna of the order Scombriformes. It lives in temperate and tropical waters across the globe in the epipelagic and mesopelagic zones. There are six distinct stocks known globally in the Atlantic, Pacific, and Indian oceans, as well as in the Mediterranean Sea. The albacore has an elongate, fusiform body with a conical snout, large eyes, and remarkably long pectoral fins. Its body is a deep blue dorsally and shades of silvery white ventrally. Individuals can reach up to 1.4 m (4 ft 7 in) in length.

Albacore are pelagic predators, eating a wide variety of foods, including fish, crustaceans, and cephalopods. They are unique among tuna in that their primary food-source is cephalopods, with fish making up a much smaller portion of their diet. Reproduction usually occurs from November to February and is oviparous. An adult female can release over two million eggs in a single cycle. Fry (juvenile fish) generally stay near where they were spawned for about a year before moving on. Albacore form schools based on their stage in the life cycle, but also combine with other tuna like the skipjack tuna, yellowfin tuna, and bluefin tuna. Schools of grown albacore are highly migratory.

The albacore is a very economically important fish and is a target of commercial and recreational fisheries. It was originally the basis for the United States tuna canning industry and is no less important today, making up significant percentages of the gross domestic products of various Pacific nations. Previously listed as "Near Threatened" by the International Union for Conservation of Nature (IUCN) because of the threat of overfishing, the species moved to the category "Least Concern" in 2021. Several stocks were in significant decline but are now recovering thanks to the enforcement of regional fishing quotas.

== Taxonomy and phylogeny ==
The first scientific description of the albacore was authored in 1788 by Pierre Joseph Bonnaterre in the illustrated encyclopedia Tableau encyclopédique et methodique des trois règnes de la nature. He originally placed it in the mackerel genus Scomber. It was assigned to the genus Thunnus by ichthyologists Bruce B. Collette and Cornelia E. Nauen in 1983. It is a member of the Thunnus subgenus, also known as the bluefin group. Populations of albacore differ genetically by region, with Atlantic, Pacific, and Mediterranean groups each showing differences in mitochondrial and nuclear DNA.

== Description ==
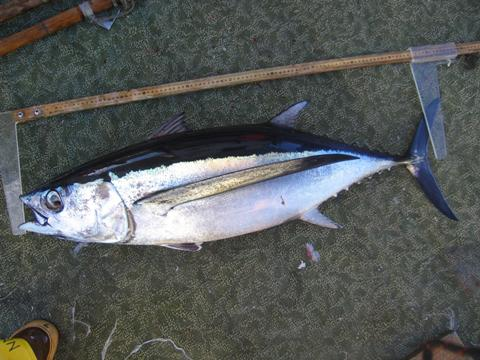
The albacore's pectoral fins can be longer than 30% of the fish's total length.

The albacore has a streamlined, fusiform body with a conical snout, large mouth, and big eyes. Its body is dark blue dorsally, shades of silvery white ventrally, and covered by small scales. The pectoral fins begin slightly before the first dorsal fin and extend well beyond the front of the anal fin, usually as far as the second dorsal finlet, often as long as 30% of the fish's total length. Like the fish's body, the fins are dark blue on top, but change to a medium yellow color on the underside. They are markedly shorter in fish under 0.5 m (1 ft 8 in) in length, often resulting in confusion with T. obesus juveniles, which also have long pectoral fins, though these are rounded at the tips where the albacore's taper to a point. The first dorsal fin is a deep yellow and the second, which is smaller than the first, is a light yellow, as is the anal fin. It has 7–9 dorsal finlets and 7–8 anal finlets, dark blue and silvery white in color respectively, matching the part of the fish's body they are on. The caudal fin is also silvery white. At 1.4 m (4 ft 7 in) maximum length, the albacore is the smallest of the bluefin tuna. It reaches sexual maturity at 0.9 m (2 ft 11 in) and its common length is only slightly larger at 1.0 m (3 ft 3 in). Males and females exhibit no sexual dimorphism.

== Distribution and habitat ==
The albacore has a cosmopolitan distribution in tropical and temperate waters across the globe and in every ocean as well as the Mediterranean Sea.

Its latitudinal range extends from 59°N to 46°S. Its temperature range is 10–25 °C (50–77 °F). Its depth range is 0–600 m (0–1,969 ft; 0–328 fathoms) in the epipelagic and mesopelagic zones. It is most often found in surface waters 15.6–19.4 °C (60.1–66.9 °F) in temperature, though larger individuals can be found in deeper waters 13.5–25.2 °C (56.3–77.4 °F). It can survive at temperatures as low as 9.5 °C (49.1 °F) for short periods of time. It favors areas where warm and cool water mix.

== Migration ==
A highly migratory species, schools of albacore travel great distances, though Atlantic and Pacific populations do not appear to mix. North Pacific albacore migrate to two regions of the Northeast Pacific: one off the northern part of Baja California, Mexico, and the other off the coasts of Washington and Oregon. Every summer, North Atlantic albacore head to the Bay of Biscay off of France and Spain, but now arrive about 8 days earlier than they did 40 years ago.

Since the 1970s the NOAA Fisheries, Southwest Fisheries Science Center (SWFSC) has collaborated with American Fishermen's Research Foundation (AFRF) in tagging studies of albacore in the North Pacific. Through these studies we have learned that juvenile albacore (to 2 years of age) make trans-Pacific migrations in their younger years between Japan and the West coast of North America. To date over 24,000 albacore have been tagged with conventional dart tags and 1,245 of these have been recovered. In Spring of 2001 AFRF and the SWFSC began a pilot project to learn more about the migration habits of North Pacific albacore, Thunnus alalunga in an effort to allow the incorporation of detailed migration movements into stock assessment models. Archival tags are a recent technical innovation that are being used to collect daily locations (through light level data recorded by the tag), internal temperature of the fish's abdomen, ambient water temperature, and depth. Genetic research using ddRAD sequencing indicates that albacore migrate between the North and South Pacific oceans across the equator.

== Biology and ecology ==
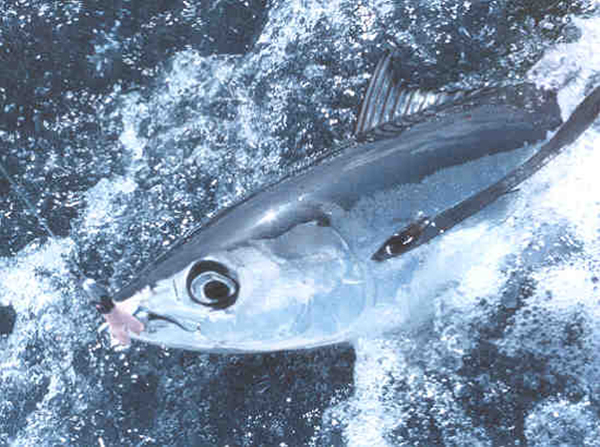
Freshly hooked albacore tuna

The albacore is a powerful, hard-hitting predator that forms mixed schools with skipjack tuna, yellowfin tuna, and bluefin tuna, sometimes around floating objects like sargassum weeds. Schools of albacore are highly migratory within bodies of water and segregated by maturity, with older fish tending to form more compact groups. Of those caught by humans, immature albacore have a 1:1 sex ratio while older albacore are mostly male. In the Atlantic Ocean, older fish are found in cooler waters. The opposite is true for the Pacific Ocean, where fish are found more abundantly along thermal discontinuities. Depth range also varies by location: Atlantic fish dive as deep as 600 m (2,000 ft) where Pacific fish reach only 380 m (1,250 ft) in depth. In the northeast Atlantic, feeding migrations to productive areas occur during the summer. Due to climate changes over the last 40 years, the timing and spatial distribution of the albacore have also changed.

Albacore show a broad range of behavioral differences by region. In Baja California, albacore make frequent dives to depths exceeding 200 m (660 ft) during the day and stay near the surface at night, while off the coast of Washington and Oregon they stay near the surface the entire day. Albacore never really rest; their need for oxygen means they must always be on the move.

=== Feeding ===
Albacore tuna are pelagic (open-sea) predators. Their diets vary little from season to season. Unlike other tuna that eat primarily fish, for example the bigeye and yellowfin tuna, the albacore's main source of food is cephalopods. The most abundant cephalopod in its diet is Heteroteuthis dispar, a tiny deep-water squid found in the Mediterranean Sea and Atlantic Ocean. Another cephalopod species preyed upon is Berryteuthis anonychus. Other food sources of the albacore include fish (including Cololabis saira, Engraulis japonicus, and Engraulis mordax), crustaceans, and gelatinous organisms. Not much is known about the food pattern of the albacore, however, mostly because it dives over 400 m (1,300 ft) underwater when searching for food, and tagging and tracking has been unsuccessful thus far.

=== Life history ===
The albacore's reproduction is oviparous and a 20 kg (44 lb) female can produce between 2–3 million eggs per spawning, which usually takes place between November and February. Eggs mature outside of the female's body and hatch in 1–2 days, after which fry begin to grow quickly. For the first year of their lives, juveniles remain close to the place where they were hatched. They begin to migrate after their first year. Albacore have a lifespan of 11–12 years, but they reach reproductive maturity at around 5–6 years.

A large majority of albacore have larger right testes or ovaries, depending on sex. Albacore have asynchronous oocyte development, that is their immature egg cells do not develop at regular intervals. The creation of ova, known as oogenesis, begins with the rapid production of oogonia (undifferentiated germ cells that give rise to oocytes) by mitotic separations in the oogonial nests of female tuna. The resulting oocytes are cast en masse into the sea, where full development and later fertilization take place.

== Human interaction ==
=== Commercial fishery ===
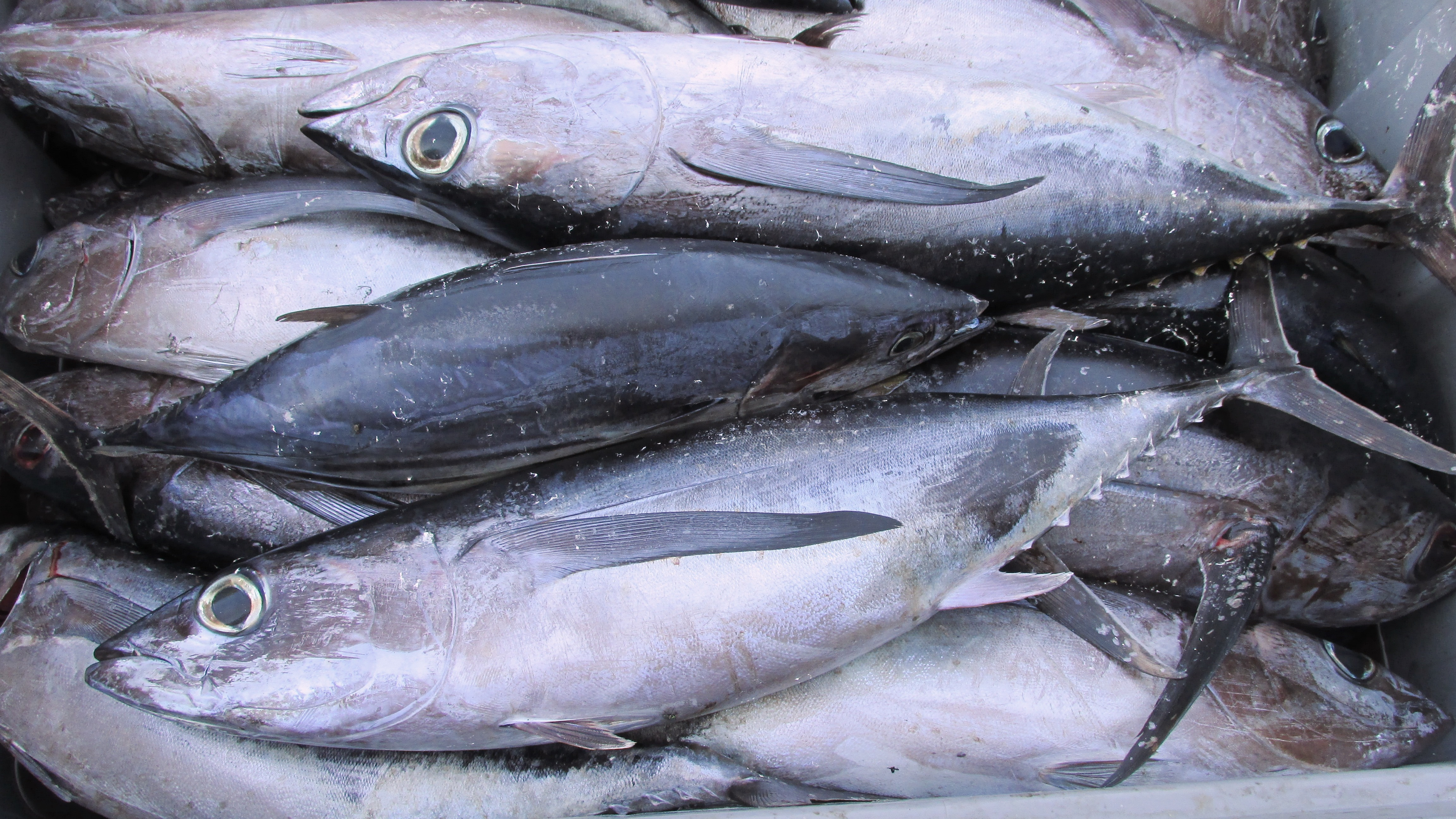
Albacore caught off Cyprus

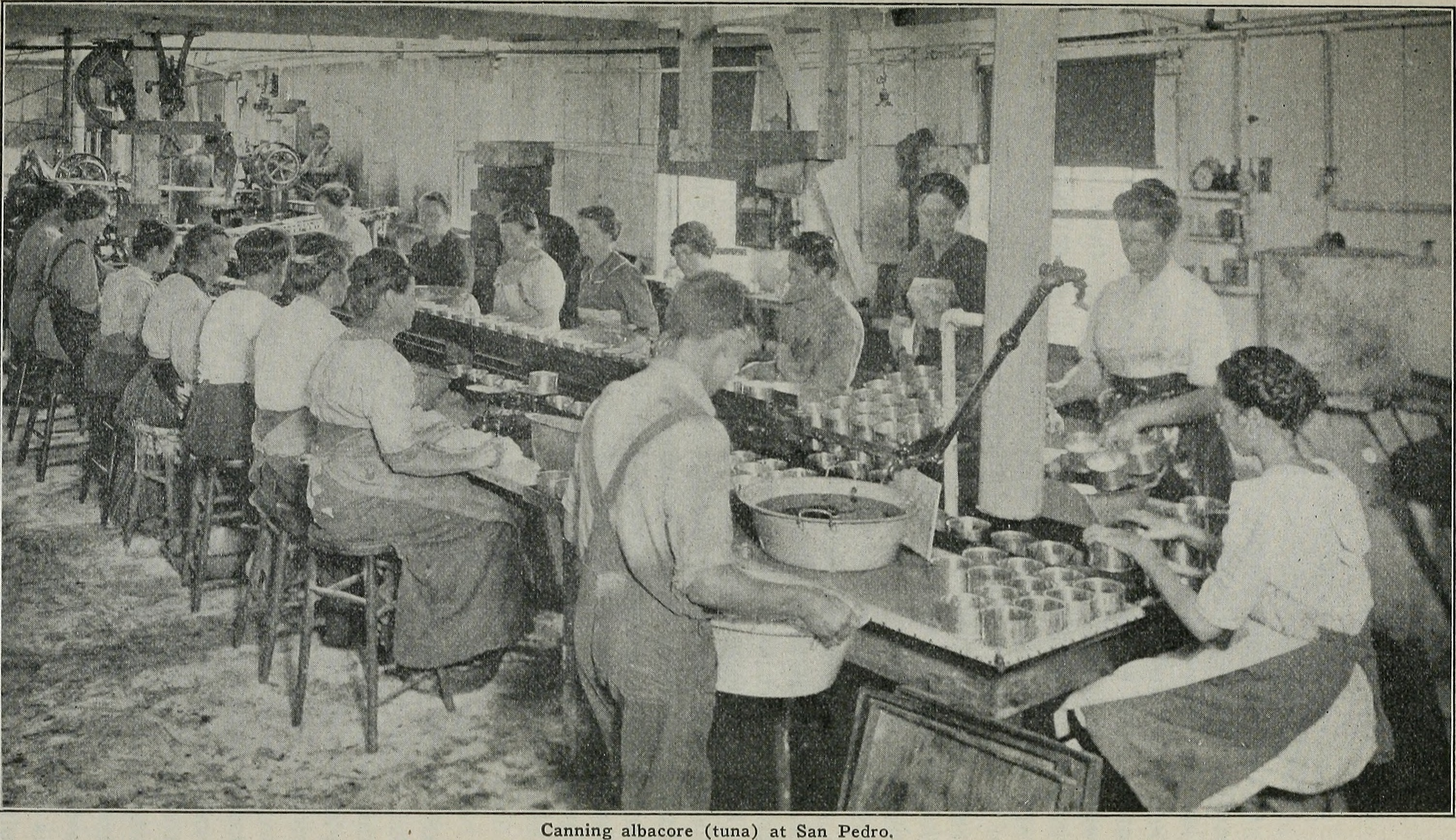
Albacore being canned in San Pedro in 1915

Global capture production of Albacore (Thunnus alalunga) in thousand tonnes from 1950 to 2022, as reported by the FAO

Albacore is a prized food, and the albacore fishery is economically significant. Methods of fishing include pole and line, long-line fishing, trolling, and some purse seining.

The harvest of albacore tuna for commercial use began at the start of the 20th century. The migratory patterns of the fish brought droves of albacore schools near the coastline of southern California, which sparked the start of commercial albacore fishing. In 1903, 700 cases of albacore were used as an experimental pack which ultimately led to the development of the U.S. tuna-canning industry. The experiment was a huge success, and the commercial fishery expanded rapidly due to the high level of demand for canned tuna. By the 1920s, the industry expanded further and three other species of tuna—bluefin, yellowfin, and skipjack—were also being canned. Albacore tuna is the only species that can be marketed as "white meat tuna". The canning industry uses this label to differentiate canned albacore from other types of tuna.

From 2010 to 2013, a study by Oceana, an ocean preservation organization, tested over 114 samples of tuna, and found that 84% of the white tuna samples were actually escolar.

Many Pacific island countries and territories (PICTs) heavily rely on oceanic fisheries for economic development and food security. The albacore is one of the main four species of tuna that support oceanic fisheries along with the skipjack, yellowfin, and the bigeye tunas. Domestic tuna fleets and local fish processing operations contribute from 3–20% of the gross domestic product in four PICTs. License fees from foreign ships provide an average of 3–40% of government revenue for seven different PICTs. Processing facilities and tuna fishing vessels provide more than 12,000 jobs for workers in the Pacific islands. Fish provide 50–90% of dietary animal protein in rural areas of PICTs.

=== Recreational fishery ===
Albacore are sought after by sport fishers. Since 2000, a large recreational fishery for albacore has been established in Oregon, Washington and California. The fisheries in Oregon and Washington are supported by seasonal warm water influxes from the California Current with the season lasting from mid-July until October.

=== Conservation ===
==== Fisheries management ====
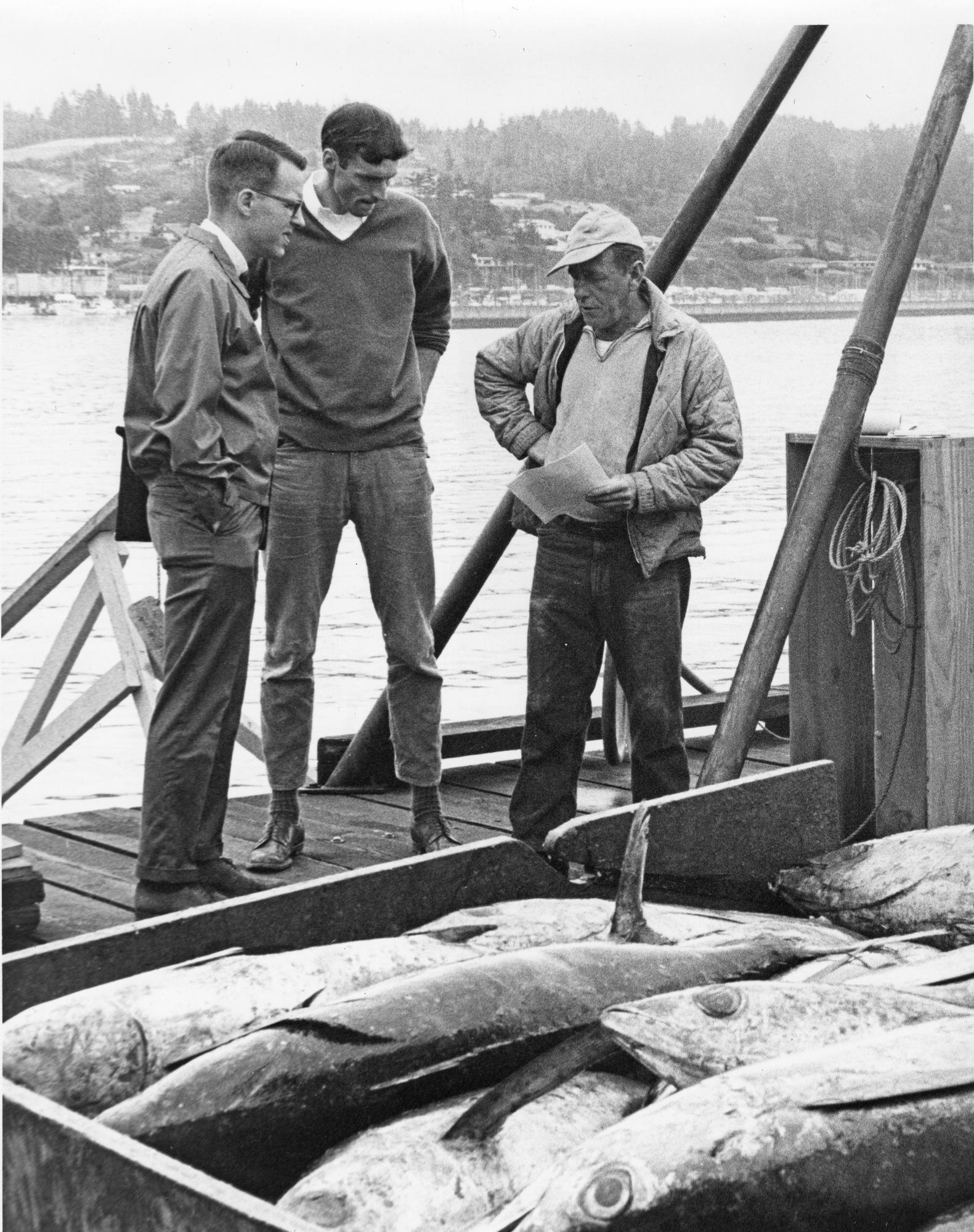
Hatfield Marine Science Center researchers talk to an albacore fisherman in Newport

Albacore are managed by four tuna Regional Fisheries Management Organizations (RFMO's): the Western and Central Pacific Fisheries Commission (WCPFC), the Inter-American Tropical Tuna Commission (IATTC), the International Commission for the Conservation of Atlantic Tunas (ICCAT), and the Indian Ocean Tuna Commission (IOTC). ICCAT has established catch quotas in the North and South Atlantic.

There are six globally managed stocks of albacore worldwide, one in the North Pacific, one in the South Pacific, another in the Indian Ocean, two for the North and South Atlantic, and one in the Mediterranean Sea.

There is substantial uncertainty on current stock status, since different models and assumptions provide a wide range of estimates. However, most of them agreed on the view that spawning stock biomass decreased since the 1930s and started to recover since the mid-1990s. Most of the model formulations, as well as the base case, concluded that currently the stock is not undergoing overfishing but the spawning stock biomass is overfished. IOTC judges albacore in the Indian Ocean are not overfished, but maintaining or increasing effort in the core albacore fishing grounds is likely to result in further declines in albacore biomass. All of the tuna Regional Fisheries Management Organizations noted that there is uncertainty surrounding the life history and biology of tunas and tuna like species including age and growth, maturity, and natural mortality rates; uncertainty about the quality and completeness of available data; and uncertainty about recruitment.

The WCPFC has assessed the South Pacific Albacore are not overfished.

In the 2014 assessment, the Albacore Working Group of the International Scientific Committee for Tuna and Tuna-like Species in North Pacific Ocean found estimates of total stock biomass (age 1 and older) show a long-term decline from the early 1970s to 1990 followed by a recovery through the 1990s and subsequent fluctuations without trend in the 2000s. The working group concludes that the stock is likely not in an overfished condition at present.

South Pacific albacore stocks have recently (2007 to 2015) shown a 40% reduction in stock.

Population genomic research supports the distinction of separate North and South Pacific stocks, but results indicated that interbreeding occurs between these populations and some potential migrants were genetically identified.

==== Other organizations ====
A number of programs have been developed to help consumers identify and support responsible and sustainable fisheries. Perhaps the most widely accepted of these programs is that of the Marine Stewardship Council (MSC). Several albacore fisheries have been certified as sustainable according to MSC standards, including the U.S. North and South Pacific albacore pole and line and troll/jig fisheries ("pole and troll"), Canadian North Pacific troll fishery, and the New Zealand South Pacific troll fishery.

SeaChoice ranks albacore as a "best choice" for consumers, although notes some "moderate concerns" regarding the management effectiveness (in particular, no definitive assessment of the albacore stock of the Indian Ocean fishery has taken place), and "moderate concern" over the fishing stock, especially regarding the North Atlantic albacore population, which the National Marine Fisheries Service (NMFS) considers overfished with overfishing still occurring. In 2007, SeaChoice considered the southern Atlantic stock to be overfished but not currently experiencing overfishing. They regarded North Pacific albacore stocks as not overfished and not likely to be experiencing overfishing.

=== Mercury levels ===
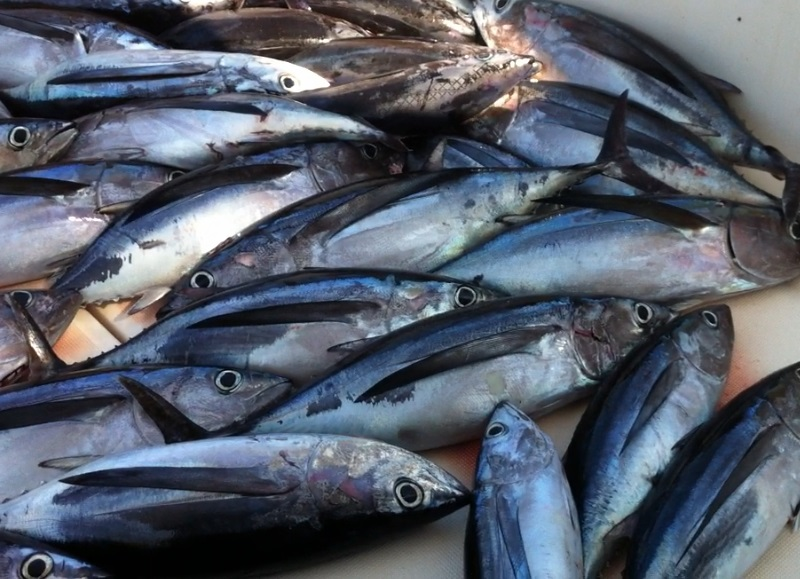
Albacore fished by rod and reel in the Cantabric Sea, Spain

Like other fish, albacore accumulate methylmercury in body tissue over time. Methylmercury is removed from the human body naturally, but it may take over a year for the levels to drop significantly. Thus, it may remain in a woman from before she becomes pregnant. Ranging from as low as 0.027 ppm (parts per million) to 0.26 ppm, the average total mercury content of albacore is 0.14 ± 0.05 ppm. Larger fish tend to bioaccumulate higher methylmercury levels. For the most part, there is positive correlation between an albacore's methylmercury measurement and its weight and length. Albacore caught by the American albacore fishing fleet off the coasts of Washington, Oregon, and California have far lower mercury levels than in previous years. Albacore caught in this region also show methylmercury levels well below the 1.0 ppm mercury standard set by The U.S. Food and Drug Administration (FDA).

=== Cuisine ===
As with other tunas, albacore meat is a versatile ingredient that is used a wide variety of dishes.

Albacore cuisine
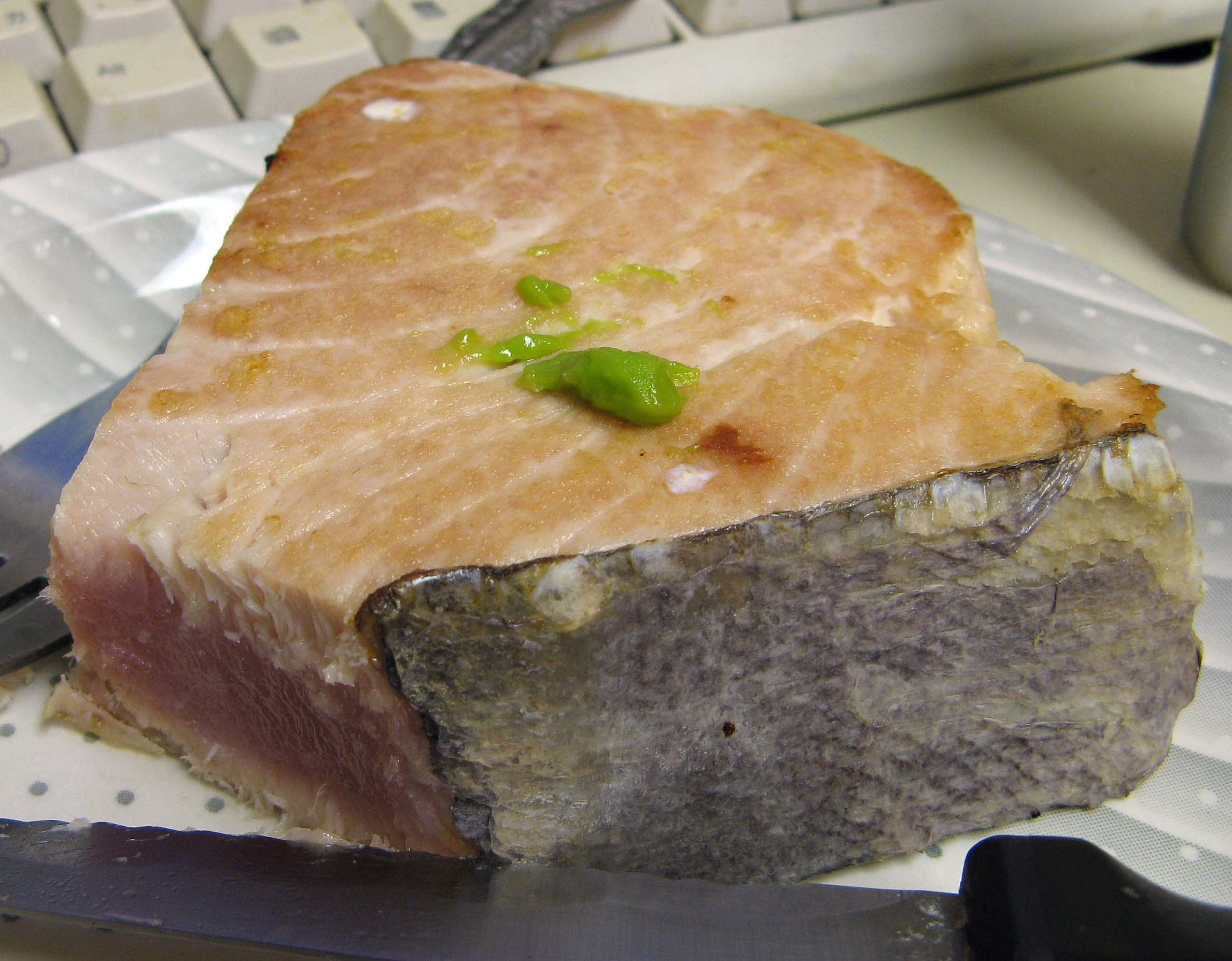
Lightly cooked albacore steak

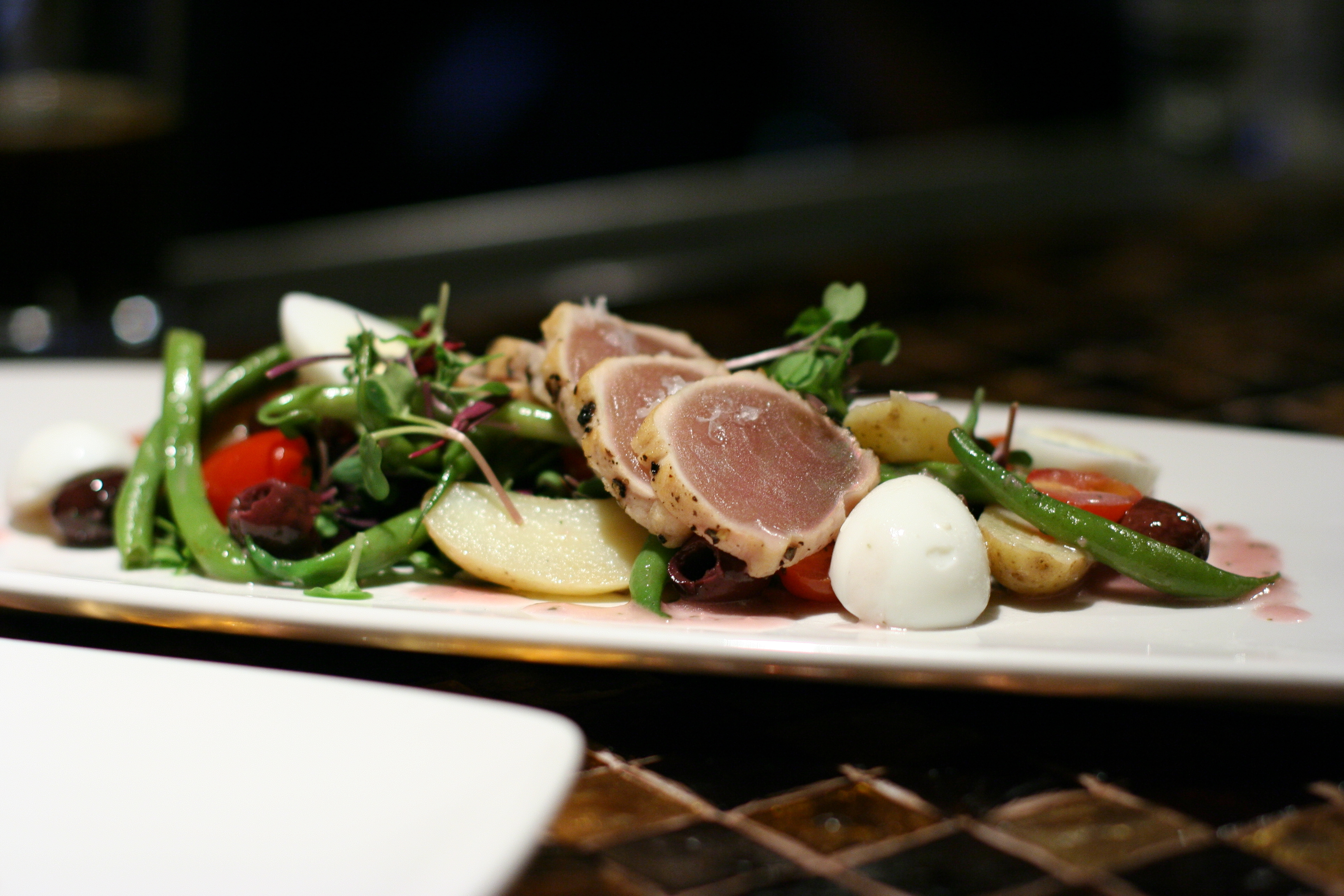
Seared albacore in a salade niçoise

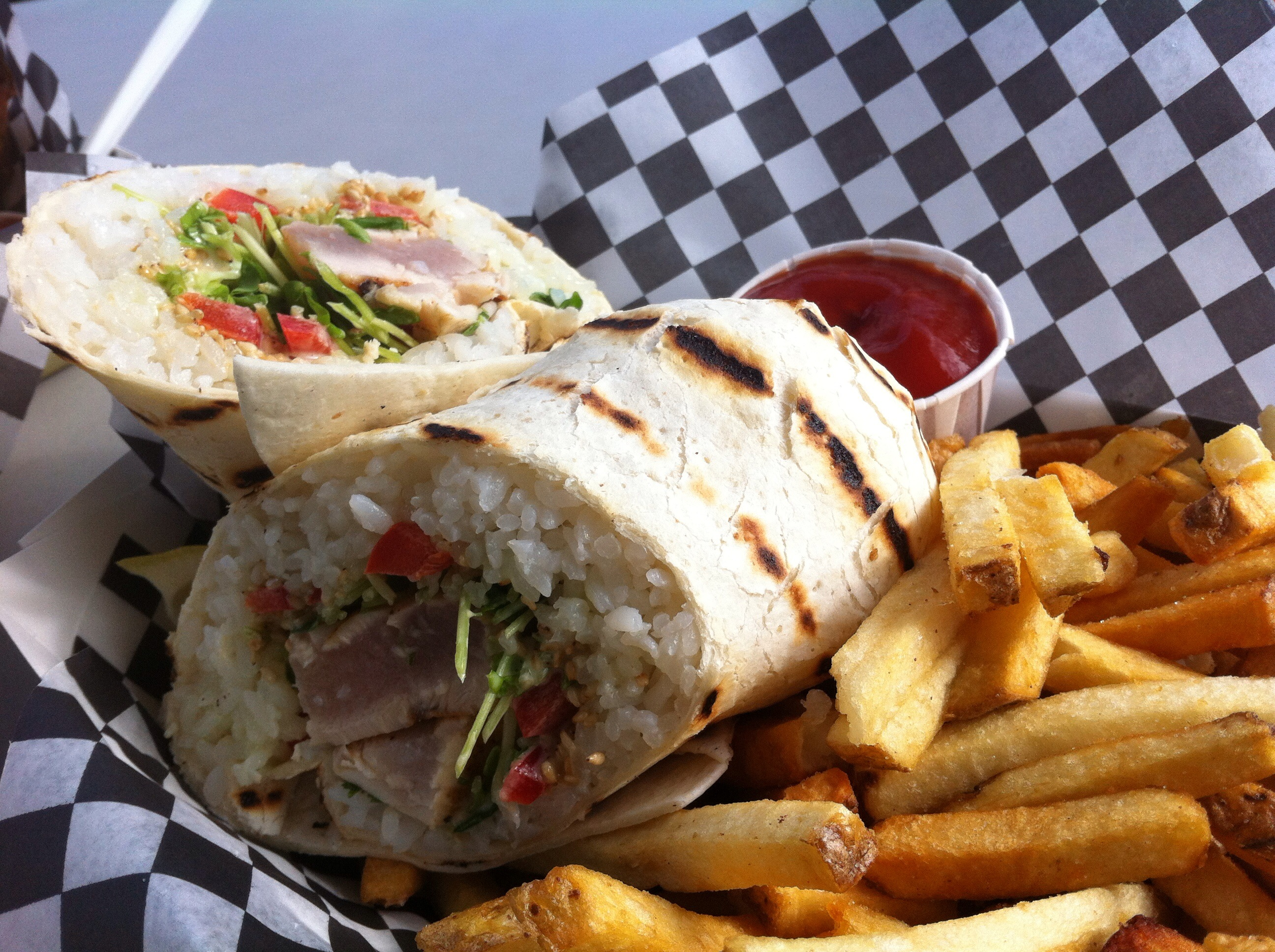
Albacore in a rice wrap

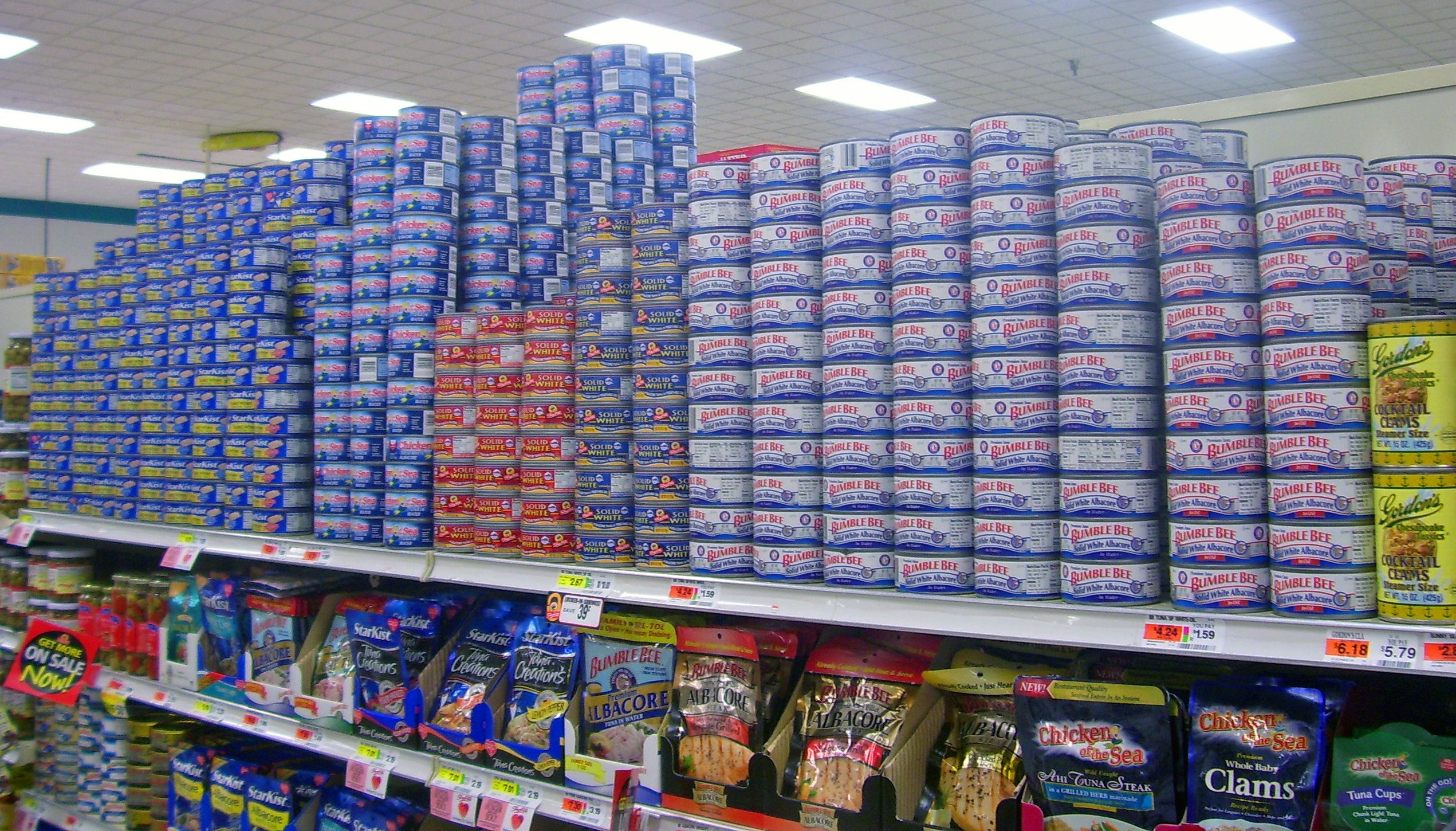
Canned albacore on sale at a supermarket

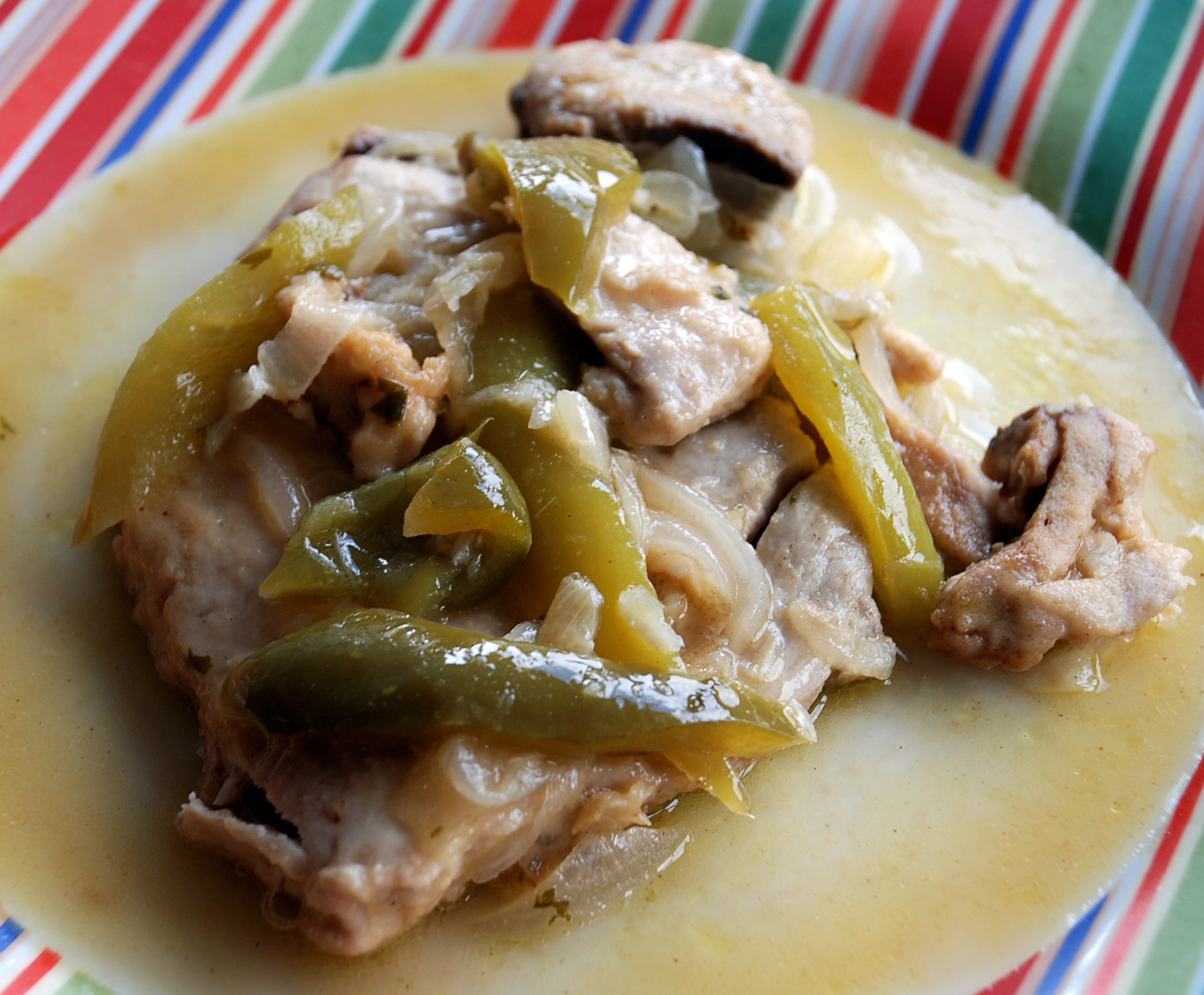
Bonito del Norte con piperrada, a Basque dish using albacore

== Other species called albacore ==
In some parts of the world, other species may be called "albacore":

- Blackfin tuna Thunnus atlanticus (albacore)
- Yellowfin tuna Thunnus albacares (albacore, autumn albacore, yellowfinned albacore)
- Yellowtail amberjack Seriola lalandi (albacore)
- Kawakawa Euthynnus affinis (false albacore)
- Little tunny Euthynnus alletteratus (false albacore)
