= S. leucoptera =

S. leucoptera may refer to:

- Sporophila leucoptera, the white-bellied seedeater, a bird species found in Argentina, Bolivia, Brazil, Paraguay, Peru and Suriname
- Stoloteuthis leucoptera, the butterfly bobtail squid, a widespread squid species found in the Atlantic Ocean, Mediterranean Sea and southwestern Indian Ocean

== See also ==
- Leucoptera (disambiguation)
