= Sepiolina petasus =

Scientific classification
- Kingdom: Animalia
- Phylum: Mollusca
- Class: Cephalopoda
- Order: Sepiolida
- Family: Sepiolidae
- Subfamily: Heteroteuthidinae
- Genus: Sepiolina
- Species: S. petasus

Binomial name
- Sepiolina petasus Kubodera & Okutani, 2011

Species of mollusc

Sepiolina petasus is a species of bobtail squid in the genus Sepiolina in the subfamily Heteroteuthidinae of the family Sepiolidae. It was originally collected in the Pacific Ocean near the Okinawa Islands. It was found to be sympatric with Sepiolina nipponensis but differs from that species by its relatively elongated posterior mantle, leading to more anteriorly situated fins.
