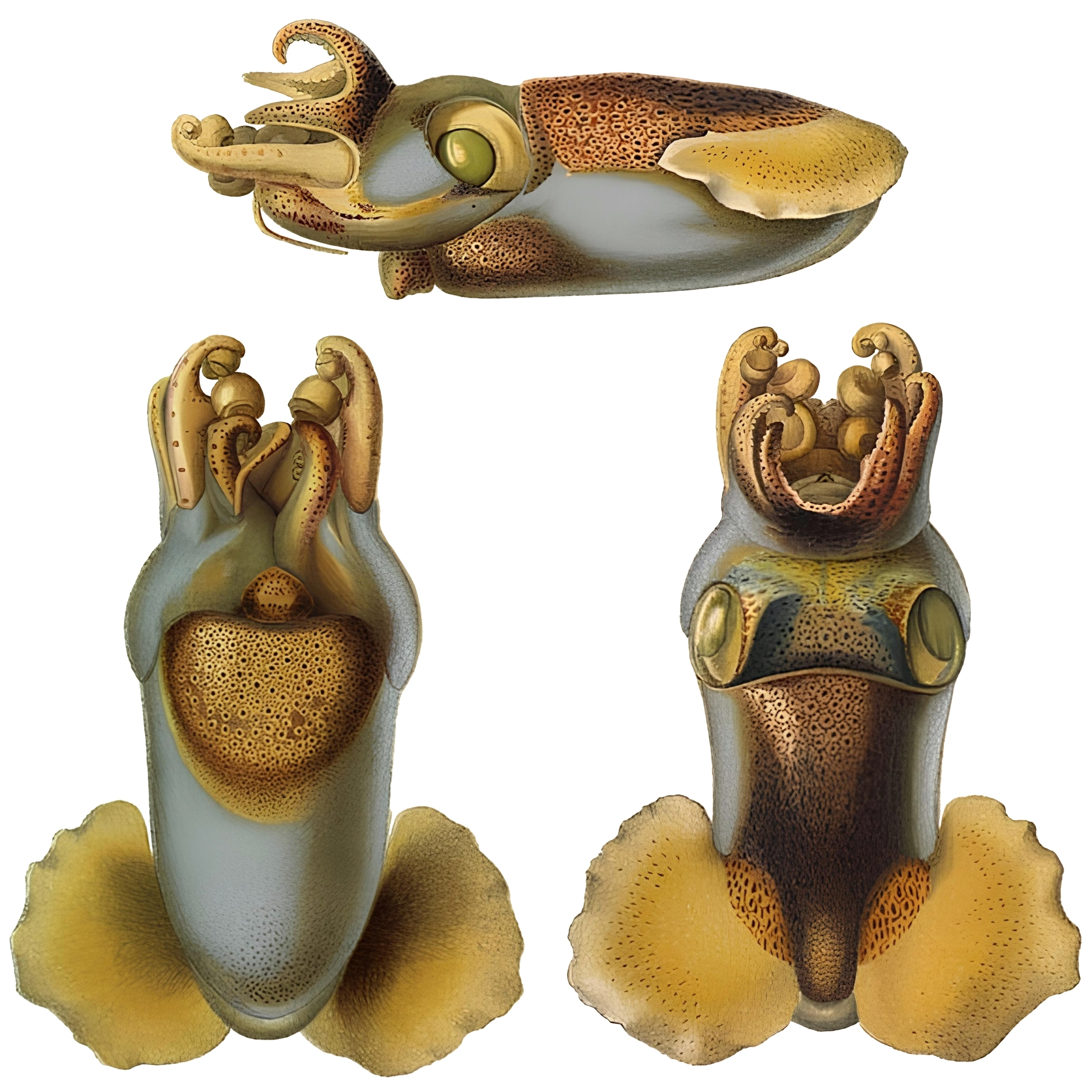

Conservation status
- Data Deficient (IUCN 3.1)

Scientific classification
- Kingdom: Animalia
- Phylum: Mollusca
- Class: Cephalopoda
- Order: Sepiolida
- Family: Sepiolidae
- Subfamily: Heteroteuthidinae
- Genus: Heteroteuthis
- Species: H. dispar

Binomial name
- Heteroteuthis dispar (Rüppell, 1844)

Synonyms
- Heteroteuthis (Heteroteuthis) dispar (Rüppell, 1844); Rossia dispar (Rüppell, 1844); Sepiola dispar Rüppell, 1844

= Heteroteuthis dispar =

Species of mollusc

Heteroteuthis dispar, also known as the odd bobtail, is a small deep water squid found in the North Atlantic Ocean and the Mediterranean Sea.

== Taxonomy ==
Heteroteuthis dispar is a deep sea species of squid and relatively little is known about it because of the difficulty of observing it in situ. Its description is very similar to that of Heteroteuthis hawaiiensis, which is found in the central North Pacific Ocean. It has not been possible to compare the two species side by side and so it is unclear whether they are identical. DNA sequencing should eventually clarify this issue.

== Distribution ==
Heteroteuthis dispar is found in the Mediterranean Sea and across the Atlantic Ocean. The range includes a broad swathe from southwest Ireland south to the coastal fringes of West Africa, across to Bermuda, the Caribbean Sea and the eastern fringes of the United States north to Maryland. The western and eastern Atlantic populations may be isolated.

== Description ==
There are five pairs of appendages. Arms 1 and 2 are fused at the base and each is a hectocotylus in the male. Arm 3 has two or three greatly enlarged suckers at the proximal end and a few moderate sized ones at the distal end. Arms 3 and 4 are longer than the others. In the female, arms 1 and 2 have no suckers on the distal ends. The tentacles are retractable, slender and whip-like, with a short club with eight rows of microscopically small suckers.

The funnel is found under the head and the locking apparatus has a deep, curved groove and an angled posterior pit. The mantle margin is detached from the head, and the neck cartilage is either free or fused. On the underside, the mantle shield is confined to the anterior part of the mantle. The fins are quite short and are attached to the posterior part of the mantle from which they bulge forwards. The mantle length in the adult female is about 25 millimetres.

== Biology ==
The male Heteroteuthis dispar produces a spermatophore or sperm package which is transferred to the female before she is sexually mature. She stores it and makes use of it at the optimal time for fertilisation. The spermatophore is large, constituting about 3% of her weight, and therefore disadvantageous to her. This reproductive practice may be due to the fact that finding a mate deep in the ocean at the appropriate time is difficult.

This species is found in the mesopelagic zone of the ocean at depths down to 1600 metres. Spawning takes place on the bottom and the paralarvae live at even greater depths, down to 3000 metres. Adults often live in groups at depths of 200 to 300 metres, often in areas where shrimps are found. Predators that feed on this squid include dolphins (Grampus griseus), the velvet belly lantern shark (Etmopterus spinax), the blackmouth catshark (Galeus melastomus), the small-spotted catshark, (Scyliorhinus canicula), the swordfish (Xiphias gladius) and tuna (Thunnus alalunga).

Heteroteuthis dispar can be bioluminescent, emitting light from photophores containing bacterial symbionts. A large photophore is found on the underside and contains two pores through which the luminescent material is extruded. An iridescent shutter cover helps to filter and control the light. The squid can also secrete bioluminescent mucous from glands near the ink sac. This can be released into the water through the funnel and the glowing cloud is believed to blind or confuse predators for long enough for the squid to make its escape.
