= P. leucoptera =

P. leucoptera may refer to:

- Peropteryx leucoptera, the white-winged dog-like bat, a bat species
- Piranga leucoptera, the white-winged tanager, a medium-sized American songbird species
- Prosobonia leucoptera, the Tahitian sandpiper, an extinct wader species endemic to Tahiti in French Polynesia
- Psophia leucoptera, the pale-winged trumpeter
- Pterodroma leucoptera, the Gould's petrel, a seabird species
- Pyriglena leucoptera, the white-shouldered fire-eye, a bird species

== See also ==
- Leucoptera (disambiguation)
