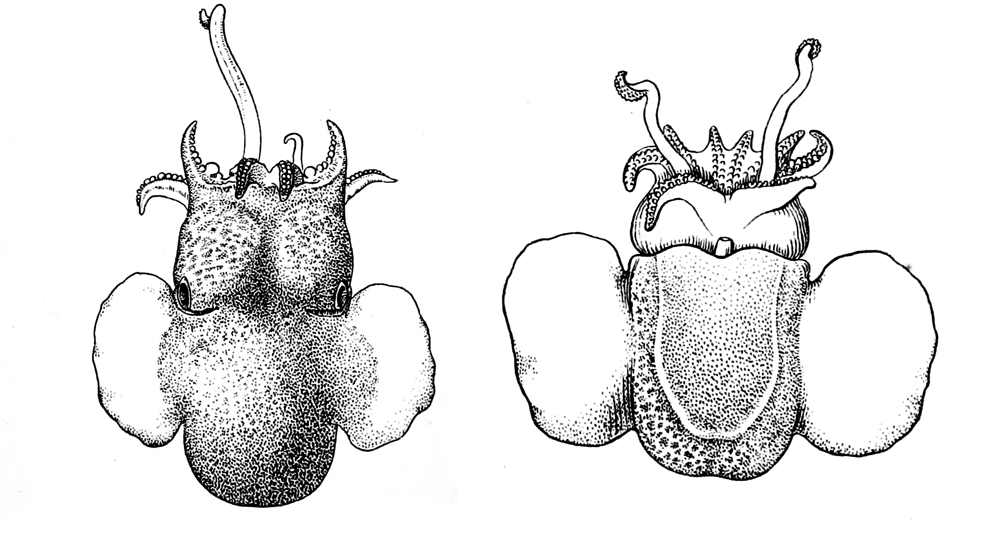
- Stolotheutis leucoptera

Scientific classification
- Kingdom: Animalia
- Phylum: Mollusca
- Class: Cephalopoda
- Order: Sepiolida
- Family: Sepiolidae
- Subfamily: Heteroteuthidinae
- Genus: Stoloteuthis (Verrill, 1881)

Type species
- Sepiola leucoptera Verrill, 1878

= Stoloteuthis =

Genus of molluscs

Stoloteuthis is a small genus of bobtail squid in the family Sepiolidae and the subfamily Heteroteuthidinae with one species, Stoloteuthis leucoptera, which is found in the western and eastern Atlantic Ocean, the Mediterranean Sea, the Indian Ocean, the Antarctic Ocean and the southwestern Pacific Ocean. The other species, Stoloteuthis japonica. was described in 2011 from a type specimen collected off northeastern Honshu.

== Species ==
Recognised species of Stoloteuthis:

- Stoloteuthis cthulhui Fernández-Álvarez, Sánchez & Villanueva, 2021
- Stoloteuthis japonica Kubodera & Okutani, 2011
- Stoloteuthis leucoptera (Verrill, 1878)
- Stoloteuthis maoria (Dell, 1959)
- Stoloteuthis weberi (Joubin, 1902)

Synonyms

- Stoloteuthis iris Berry, 1909: synonym of Iridoteuthis iris (Berry, 1909) (original combination)
- Stoloteuthis leucopterus (Verrill, 1878): synonym of Stoloteuthis leucoptera (Verrill, 1878) (Spelling variation)
- Stoloteuthis nipponensis Berry, 1911: synonym of Sepiolina nipponensis (Berry, 1911) (original combination)
