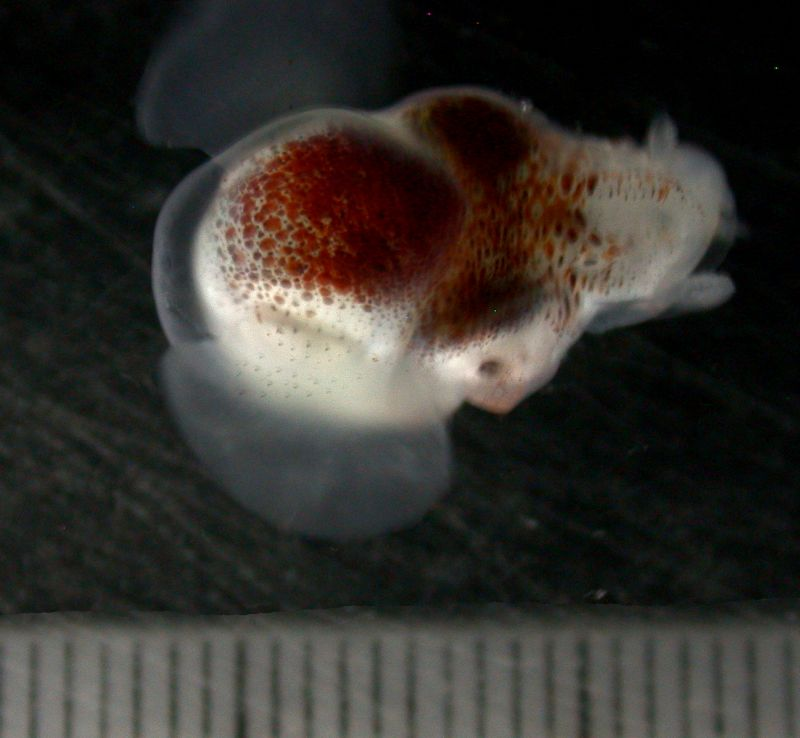

Scientific classification
- Kingdom: Animalia
- Phylum: Mollusca
- Class: Cephalopoda
- Order: Sepiolida
- Family: Sepiolidae
- Genus: Iridoteuthis
- Species: I. merlini

Binomial name
- Iridoteuthis merlini A. Reid, 2021

= Iridoteuthis merlini =

Species of mollusc

Iridoteuthis merlini is a species of bobtail squid endemic to the open ocean off New Zealand as well as eastern and south-eastern Australia. I. merlini was discovered along with Iridoteuthis lophia by Dr Amanda Reid in 2021. Her findings were published in Zootaxa.

== Discovery ==
Reid discovered Iridoteuthis merlini and Iridoteuthis lophia while studying Stoloteuthis maoria specimens in New Zealand. She discovered that they had been incorrectly described by Richard Dell in 1959, finding that the S. maoria specimens are actually squids from two different genera: Iridoteuthis and Stauroteuthis. I. merlini was named in honour of academic Professor Merlin Crossley, deputy vice chancellor of UNSW Sydney.

== Bioluminescence ==
Iridoteuthis merlini stores phosphorescent bacteria in a special organ in its body. The squid can adjust the luminous intensity of itself, and can eject jets of the luminescent bacteria into the ocean to deter potential predators.
