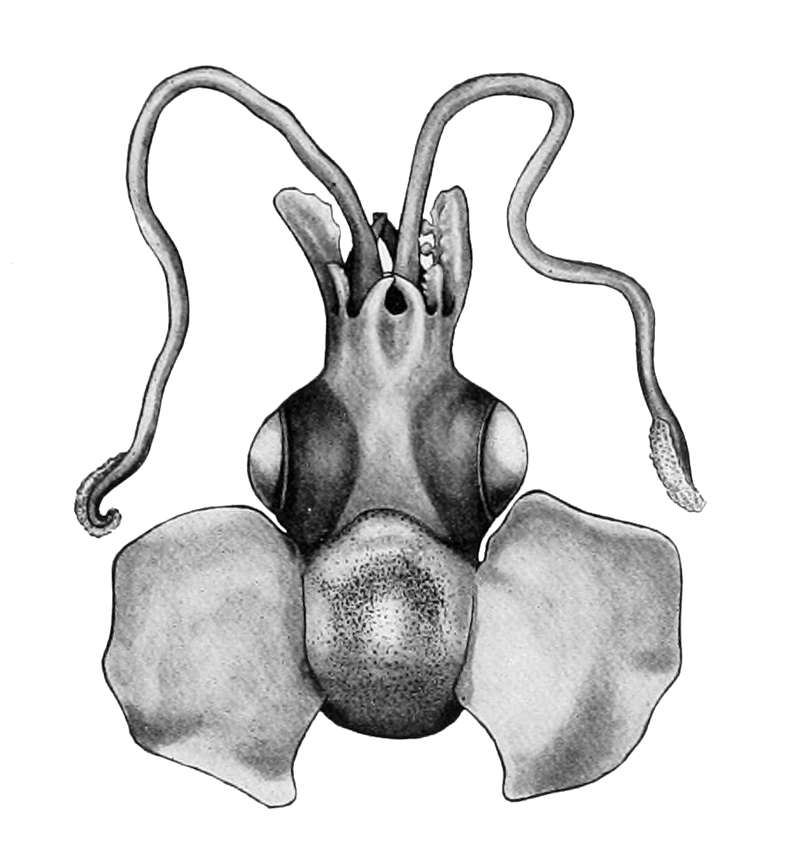
- Iridoteuthis iris

Scientific classification
- Domain: Eukaryota
- Kingdom: Animalia
- Phylum: Mollusca
- Class: Cephalopoda
- Order: Sepiolida
- Family: Sepiolidae
- Subfamily: Heteroteuthidinae
- Genus: Iridoteuthis; Naef, 1912

Type species
- Stoloteuthis iris Berry, 1909

Species
- See text.

Synonyms
- Iridotheuthis Naef, 1912 (incorrect original spelling); Iridoteuthis Naef, 1921 (emendation, accepted under ICZN Article 33.2.3.1); Iridioteuthis Sasaki, 1929 (incorrect subsequent spelling)

= Iridoteuthis =

Genus of molluscs

Iridoteuthis is a genus of bobtail squid comprising three species. They belong to the subfamily Heteroteuthinae of the family Sepiolidae.

== Species ==
- Iridoteuthis iris (Berry, 1909)
- Iridoteuthis lophia A. Reid, 2021
- Iridoteuthis merlini A. Reid, 2021

Species brought into synonymy

- Iridoteuthis maoria Dell, 1959: synonym of Stoloteuthis maoria (Dell, 1959)
