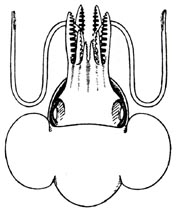

Conservation status
- Data Deficient (IUCN 3.1)

Scientific classification
- Kingdom: Animalia
- Phylum: Mollusca
- Class: Cephalopoda
- Order: Sepiolida
- Family: Sepiolidae
- Subfamily: Heteroteuthidinae
- Genus: Nectoteuthis; Verrill, 1883
- Species: N. pourtalesi

Binomial name
- Nectoteuthis pourtalesi Verrill, 1883

= Nectoteuthis =

Species of mollusc

Nectoteuthis pourtalesi is a bathybenthic species of bobtail squid native to the tropical western Atlantic Ocean, specifically Florida and the Antilles.

N. pourtalesi grows to a mantle length of 11 mm (given as "length to dorsal edge of mantle") and total length of 24 mm (given as "length to tip of longest sessile arm").

The type specimen was collected off Barbados and is deposited at the National Museum of Natural History in Washington, D.C.
