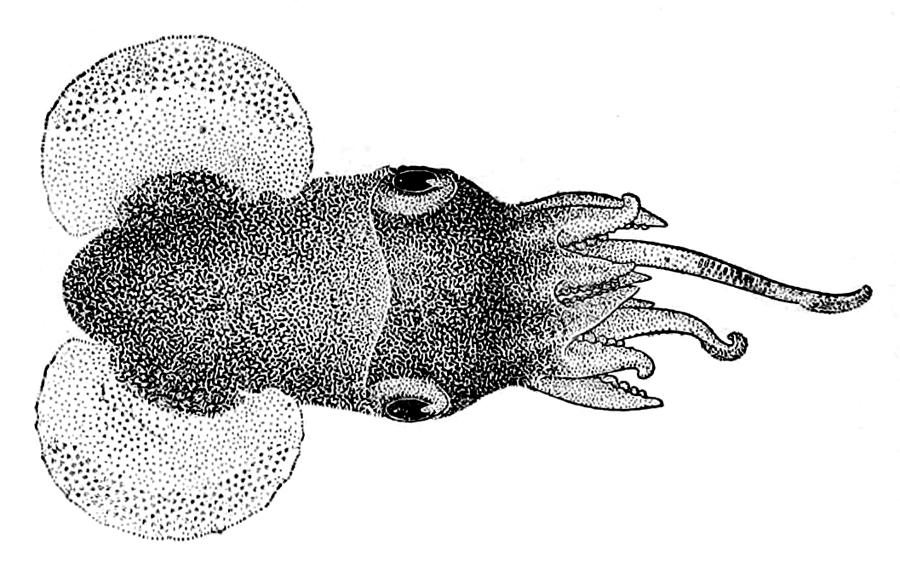
- Heteroteuthis hawaiiensis

Scientific classification
- Kingdom: Animalia
- Phylum: Mollusca
- Class: Cephalopoda
- Order: Sepiolida
- Family: Sepiolidae
- Subfamily: Heteroteuthidinae
- Genus: Heteroteuthis; Gray, 1849

Type species
- Sepiola dispar Rüppell, 1844

Synonyms
- Heteroteuthis (Heteroteuthis) J. E. Gray, 1849; Heteroteuthis (Stephanoteuthis) S. S. Berry, 1909; Stephanoteuthis S. S. Berry, 1909

= Heteroteuthis =

Genus of molluscs

Heteroteuthis is a genus of deep-sea bobtail squid comprising seven species.

== Species ==
The following species are recognised in the genus Heteroteuthis:

- Heteroteuthis atlantis
- Heteroteuthis dagamensis
- Heteroteuthis dispar, odd bobtail
- Heteroteuthis hawaiiensis
- Heteroteuthis nordopacifica
- Heteroteuthis ryukyuensis
- Heteroteuthis serventyi
