= Heteroteuthis serventyi =

Scientific classification
- Kingdom: Animalia
- Phylum: Mollusca
- Class: Cephalopoda
- Order: Sepiolida
- Family: Sepiolidae
- Genus: Heteroteuthis
- Species: H. serventyi

Binomial name
- Heteroteuthis serventyi Allan, 1945

Synonyms
- Heteroteuthis (Stephanoteuthis) serventyi J. K. Allan, 1945

Species of mollusc

Heteroteuthis serventyi is a species of bobtail squid native to the south-western Pacific Ocean, off south-eastern Australia.

The type specimen was collected in Jervis Bay, New South Wales and is deposited at the Australian Museum in Sydney. Some authorities consider H. serventyi to be a synonym of Heteroteuthis dagamensis
