= Living Oceans Society =

Canadian environmental organization

- Type: Non-profit
- Industry: Environmental Policy and Education
- Founded: Sointula, British Columbia (1998)
- Headquarters: Sointula, British Columbia, Canada
- Number of locations: 2
- Website: livingoceans.org

Living Oceans Society is a Canadian environmental organization that has been a leader in the effort to protect Canada's oceans since 1998. It is based in Sointula, British Columbia, with a satellite office in Vancouver, British Columbia. Living Oceans Society's vision states that: "Canada's oceans are sustainably managed and thriving with abundant sea life that supports vibrant and resilient communities."

== Initiatives ==
Living Oceans Society focuses its work on six initiatives: salmon farming, ocean acidification, sustainable seafood, ocean ecosystems, tankers and ocean planning.

=== Ocean planning ===
Living Oceans Society is working to establish ecosystem-based management (EBM), including a Marine Protected Areas (MPAs) network in Canada's North Pacific waters. Living Oceans Society is actively involved in both the federal Pacific North Coast Integrated Management Area (PNCIMA) marine planning process, and the Marine Planning Partnership (MaPP) between the Province of British Columbia and the First Nations groups of B.C.'s North and Central Coasts and Haida Gwaii. The organization is working with local stakeholders to manage the area's resources better and ensure a healthy ocean and healthy communities in the region. To support this work, Living Oceans Society has researched and analyzed socio-economics of coastal communities, current management practices for MPAs, and fishing bycatch, and has gathered data in deep sea ecosystems.

=== Ocean acidification ===
Stopping ocean acidification requires a reduction in carbon dioxide emissions. Ecosystems can better adapt and survive acidification if natural resilience is preserved. Therefore, Living Oceans Society is pushing the Canadian government for effective climate policy, marine protected areas and sustainable fishing practices. They also strive to increase awareness through an information campaign and a partnership with the Climate Action Network Canada.

=== Sustainable seafood ===
Living Oceans Society is a founding member of SeaChoice, a program that helps consumers and businesses make choices that support sustainable seafood. Living Oceans Society partners with industry leaders who are pioneering sustainable fishing and aquaculture practices, and connects these partners with consumers that are demanding their products. SeaChoice works closely with the Monterey Bay Aquarium’s Seafood Watch program to ensure that all sustainability assessments are accurate and grounded in science. Living Oceans Society also pushes the Canadian government to address issues such as bycatch, deep sea fisheries impacts and salmon farming.

=== Salmon farming ===
Living Oceans Society co-ordinates the Coastal Alliance for Aquaculture Reform (CAAR), a coalition of five leading Canadian environmental organizations that work to promote a transition from open net-cage salmon aquaculture to closed-containment salmon aquaculture in British Columbia. CAAR works with the government and industry on sea lice monitoring, and researches the viability of closed containment aquaculture systems. It also works with grocery retailers and restaurants to inform them about the issues related to open net-cage salmon aquaculture, and the alternatives. CAAR is also a participant in the Salmon Aquaculture Dialogues.

=== Ocean ecosystems ===
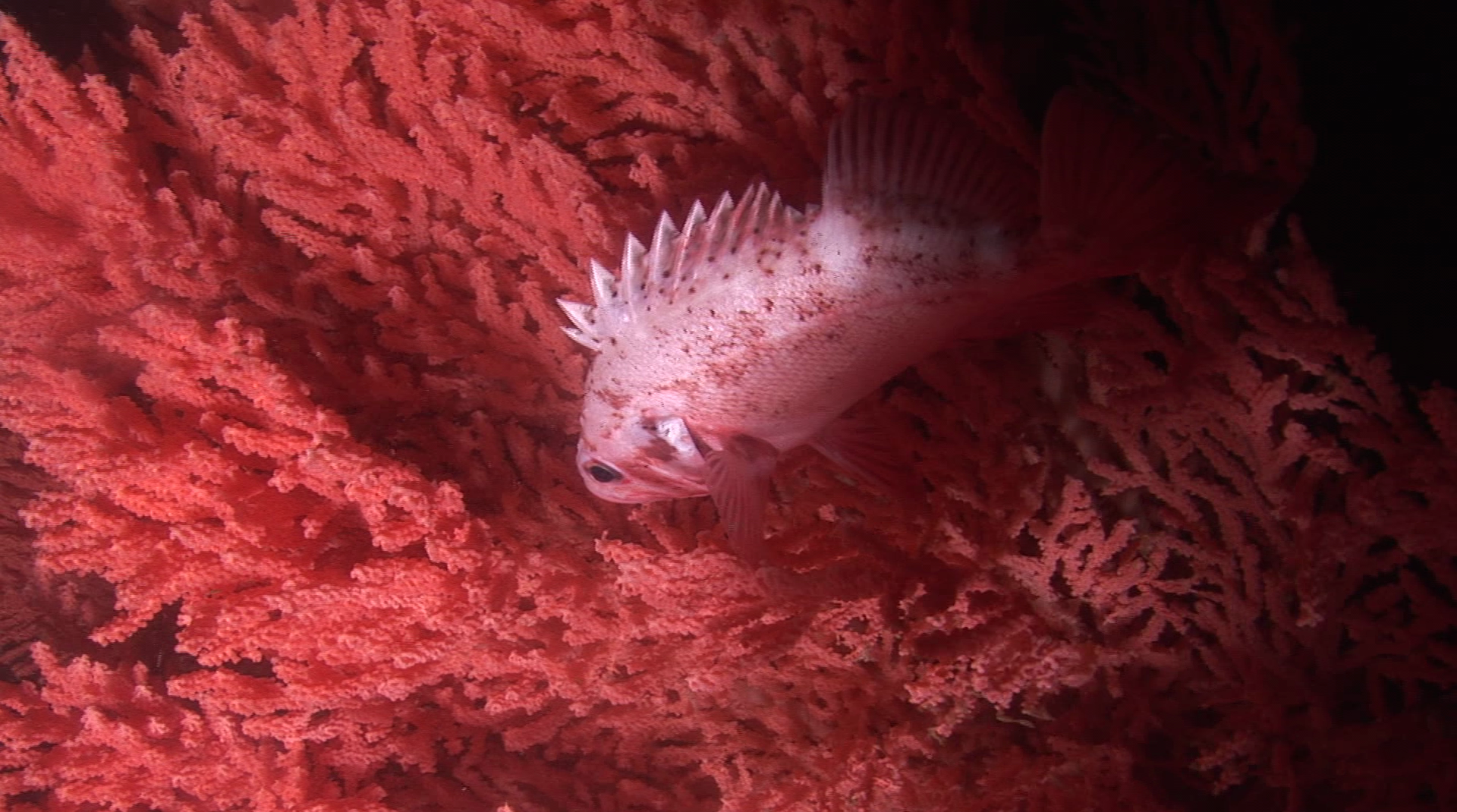
A rockfish hides in red tree coral.

Living Oceans Society strives to protect the four basic building blocks of ocean ecosystems: habitat, biodiversity, food webs, and water quality. This includes participating in efforts to improve the science and management for important kinds of habitats, such as deep-sea corals and glass sponge reefs. In 1999, the Society collaborated on the Reef Environmental Education Foundation (REEF) Fish Survey. In 2009, the Society conducted the Finding Coral Expedition. This expedition brought together a group of international scientists and Living Oceans Society staff to study Canada's Pacific cold water corals and document threats to their well being.

=== Tankers ===
Living Oceans Society is participating in the movement to prevent oil tankers from using the North and Central Coast of British Columbia as a transportation route and is calling for a permanent legislated tanker ban in this region. This initiative is currently focused on the proposed Enbridge Northern Gateway Pipelines project, designed to bring crude oil from the tar sands to a marine terminal in Kitimat, B.C., where it could then be transported via supertanker to markets in Asia and the United States. An independent poll conducted in May, 2010 found that 80 percent of British Columbians disagreed with the proposed project. Living Oceans Society is participating in the federal government's environmental assessment of the project.

== Bibliography ==
- Ardron, Jeff (2002). "A GIS Recipe for Determining Benthic Complexity: An Indicator of Species Richness". In Breman, Joe (ed.). Marine Geography: GIS for the Oceans and Seas. ESRI Press. pp. 169–176. ISBN 978-1-58948-045-2.
- Living Oceans Society (2008). Fish for Thought: An Eco-Cookbook. Arsenal Pulp Press. ISBN 978-1-55152-081-0.
