= Amphorateuthis =

- Amphorateuthis alveatus paratype no. 2 (15 mm ML)

Conservation status
- Data Deficient (IUCN 3.1)

Scientific classification
- Kingdom: Animalia
- Phylum: Mollusca
- Class: Cephalopoda
- Order: Sepiolida
- Family: Sepiolidae
- Subfamily: Heteroteuthidinae
- Genus: Amphorateuthis; Young, Vecchione & Roper, 2007
- Species: A. alveatus

Binomial name
- Amphorateuthis alveatus Young, Vecchione & Roper, 2007

Genus of molluscs

Amphorateuthis alveatus is a species of bobtail squid native to the Indian Ocean. It is characterised by unique modifications of the arms in males; mature males exhibit elongate suckers in numerous series on arm pairs II and IV.

A. alveatus is known from only four specimens. The holotype and paratype no. 1 were collected off western Tanzania at 6°51′S 39°54′E. Paratype no. 3 was caught at virtually the same locality in a 40 ft bottom trawl that fished to a depth of 100 m. Paratype no. 2 was taken at 6°48′S 39°51′E.
