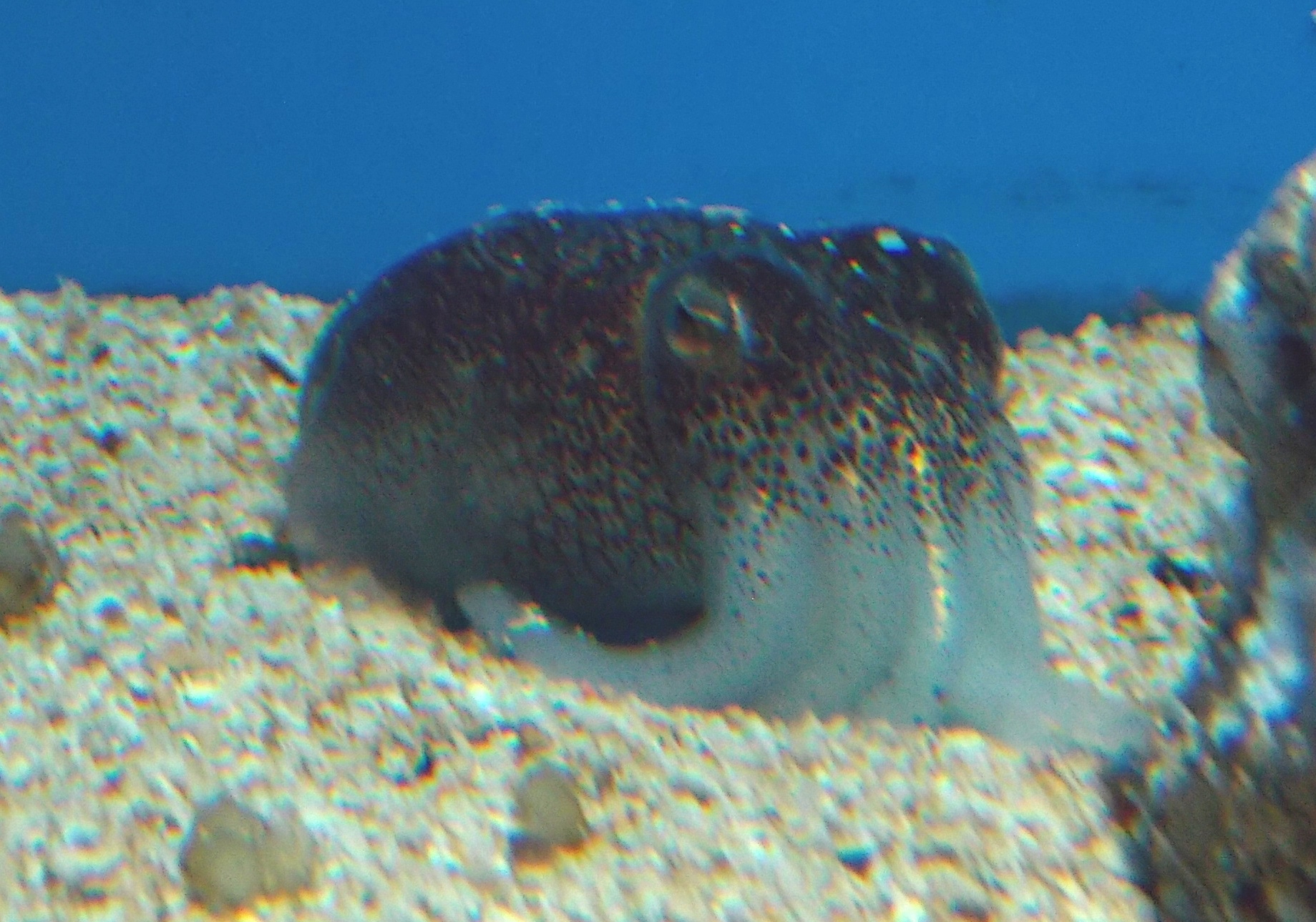
- Sepiolina nipponensis

Scientific classification
- Kingdom: Animalia
- Phylum: Mollusca
- Class: Cephalopoda
- Order: Sepiolida
- Family: Sepiolidae
- Subfamily: Heteroteuthidinae
- Genus: Sepiolina; Naef, 1912

Type species
- Sepiolina nipponensis Berry, 1911

= Sepiolina =

Genus of molluscs

Sepiolina is a small genus of bobtail squid in the family Sepiolidae and the subfamily Heteroteuthidinae from the western Pacific Ocean.

== Species ==
There are currently two species recognised in the genus Sepiolina:

- Sepiolina nipponensis (Berry, 1911)
- Sepiolina petasus Kubodera & Okutani, 2011
