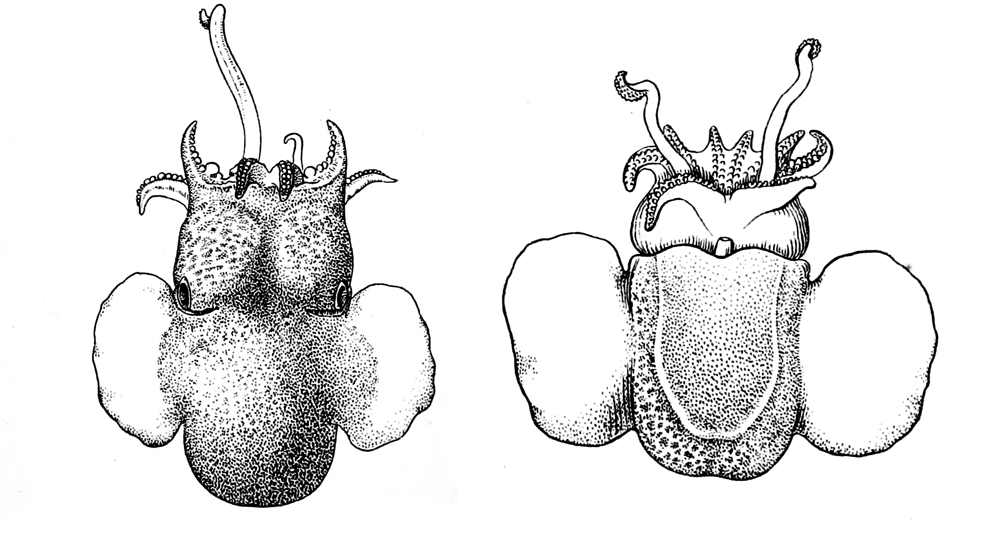
- Dorsal (left) and ventral (right) views

Conservation status
- Data Deficient (IUCN 3.1)

Scientific classification
- Kingdom: Animalia
- Phylum: Mollusca
- Class: Cephalopoda
- Order: Sepiolida
- Family: Sepiolidae
- Subfamily: Heteroteuthidinae
- Genus: Stoloteuthis
- Species: S. leucoptera

Binomial name
- Stoloteuthis leucoptera (Verrill, 1878)

Synonyms
- Sepiola leucoptera Verrill, 1878; Stoloteuthis leucopterus (A. E. Verrill, 1878)

= Stoloteuthis leucoptera =

Species of mollusc

Stoloteuthis leucoptera, also known as the butterfly bobtail squid, is a widespread species of bobtail squid. Its natural range covers the Atlantic Ocean, Mediterranean Sea, and southwestern Indian Ocean. It is distributed from the Gulf of St Lawrence to the Straits of Florida in the western Atlantic and in the Bay of Biscay in the eastern Atlantic. In the Mediterranean Sea, it is specifically found in the northern and southern Tyrrhenian Sea, Ligurian Sea, and off Gorgona Island. S. leucoptera has also been recorded from the Benguela Current off Namibia. There exist unverified records of specimens off eastern Tasmania.

On average, females are slightly larger than males. They grow to 18 mm and 17 mm in mantle length, respectively.
