= Heteroteuthis dagamensis =

Conservation status
- Data Deficient (IUCN 3.1)

Scientific classification
- Kingdom: Animalia
- Phylum: Mollusca
- Class: Cephalopoda
- Order: Sepiolida
- Family: Sepiolidae
- Subfamily: Heteroteuthidinae
- Genus: Heteroteuthis
- Species: H. dagamensis

Binomial name
- Heteroteuthis dagamensis Robson, 1924

Synonyms
- Heteroteuthis (Stephanoteuthis) dagamensis G. C. Robson, 1924; Heteroteuthis hawaiiensis var. dagamensis G. C. Robson, 1924

Species of mollusc

Heteroteuthis dagamensis is a species of bobtail squid native to the south-eastern Atlantic Ocean and south-western Indian Ocean. It occurs off western, southern, and south-eastern Africa.

The type specimen was collected off South Africa and is deposited at The Natural History Museum in London.
