= SeaChoice =

Environmental advocacy group

SeaChoice is an environmental advocacy group based in Canada. Launched in 2006, SeaChoice was created to increase consumer awareness around seafood sustainability in Canada. For 10 years, its primary goal was shifting seafood procurement to more sustainable options, with a focus on seafood suppliers and Canadian retailers. Having made significant progress in the retail landscape between 2006 and 2016, with many of their retail partners meeting their sustainable seafood commitments, SeaChoice set a new goal to increase sustainability throughout the entire seafood supply chain, from water to table.

SeaChoice is a partnership among the David Suzuki Foundation, Ecology Action Centre, and Living Oceans Society. Each conservation organization is also a member of the Conservation Alliance for Seafood Solutions and works with consumers, retailers, suppliers, government and producers to accomplish their objectives.

== Programs ==
SeaChoice has four main areas of work:

1. Seafood Progress – an online service for Canadian retailers to assess and report on their performance around sustainable seafood commitments and procurement.
2. Priority Species – species produced in Canada or imported into Canada that enter the supply chain via fisheries and aquaculture
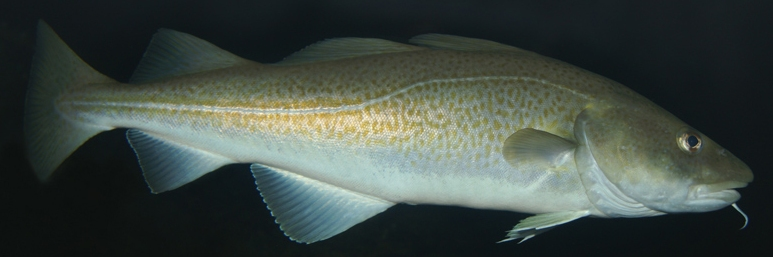
  Atlantic cod (Gadus morhua) is one of 14 SeaChoice priority species for conservation and management.
  operations that have sustainability challenges for which we are seeking solutions.
3. Eco-labels – their proactive engagement with eco-label initiatives to improve labelling standards and ensure certifications remain credible.
4. Labelling and traceability – their efforts to support sustainable seafood choices through accurate labelling and traceability from harvest to plate.

These efforts are supported by SeaChoice partner organization engagement in fisheries and aquaculture management, policy fora and project based incentives for improved fishing and farming practices.

== See also ==
- Marine Stewardship Council
- Seafood Watch
