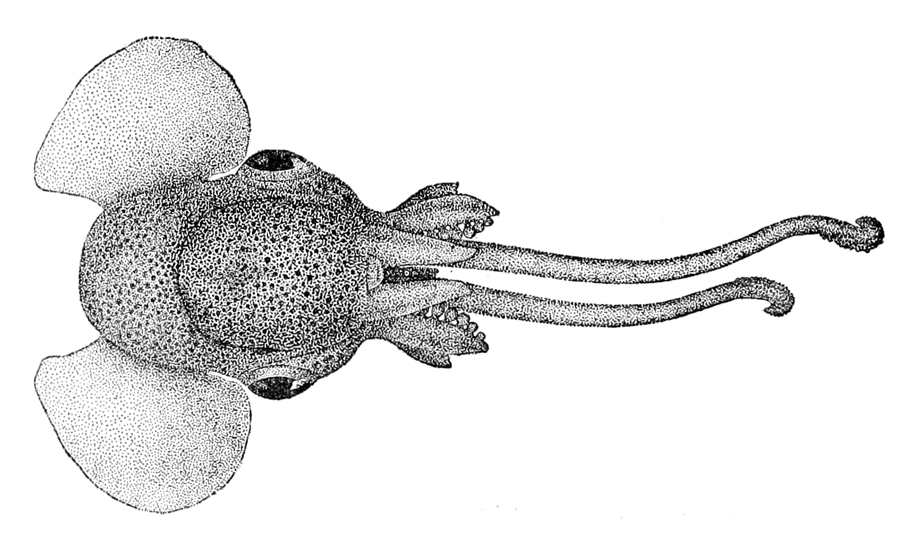
- Ventral view of type
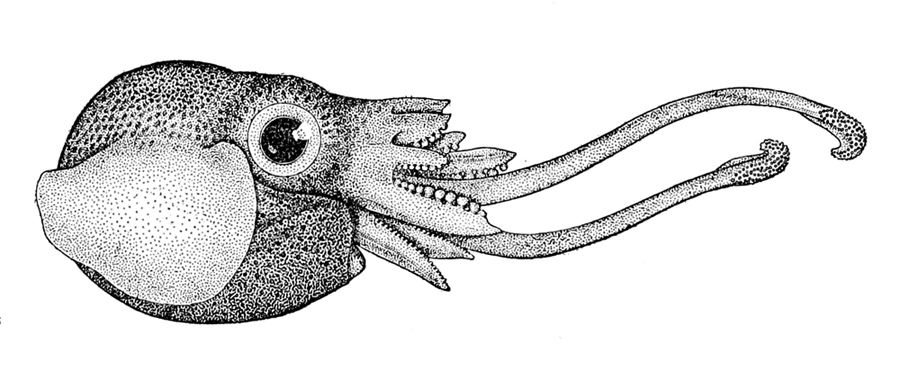
- Lateral view of type

Conservation status
- Data Deficient (IUCN 3.1)

Scientific classification
- Kingdom: Animalia
- Phylum: Mollusca
- Class: Cephalopoda
- Order: Sepiolida
- Family: Sepiolidae
- Subfamily: Heteroteuthidinae
- Genus: Iridoteuthis
- Species: I. iris

Binomial name
- Iridoteuthis iris (Berry, 1909)

Synonyms
- Stoloteuthis iris Berry, 1909

= Iridoteuthis iris =

Species of mollusc

Iridoteuthis iris is a species of bobtail squid native to the northern central Pacific Ocean; it occurs near the Hawaiian Islands off the southeast and northwest Hancock, Colahan, and Kammu seamounts. There exists a doubtful record from the Ceram Sea. Unlike most other bobtail squid, I. iris is pelagic and lives in the open ocean.

Females of this species grow to 28 mm in mantle length (ML), while males are not known to exceed 24 mm ML.

The type specimen was collected off the south coast of Molokai in Hawaii. It was originally deposited at the National Museum of Natural History in Washington, D.C., but is no longer extant.

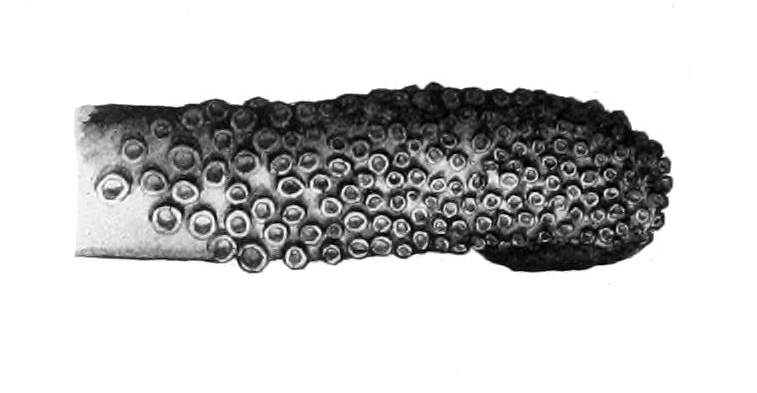
Closeup of tentacular club
