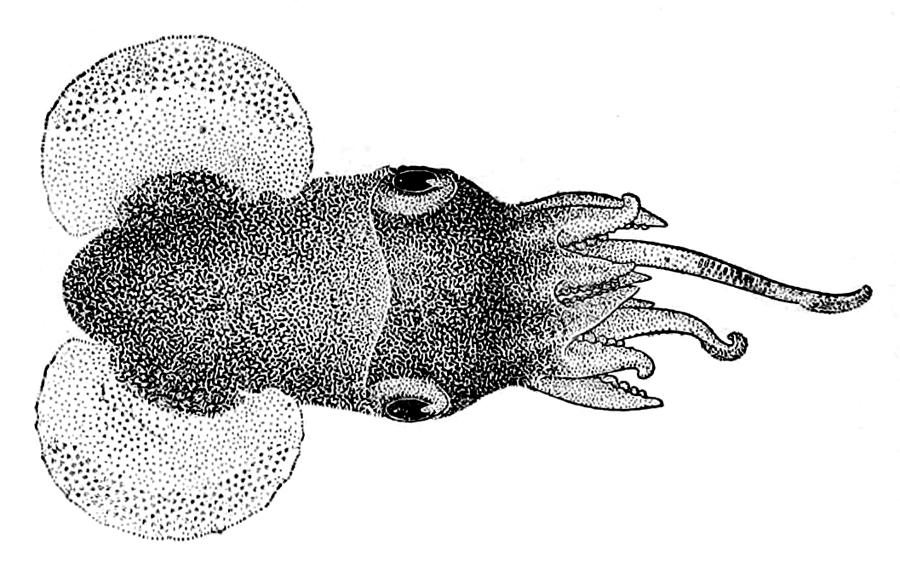
- Dorsal view of type
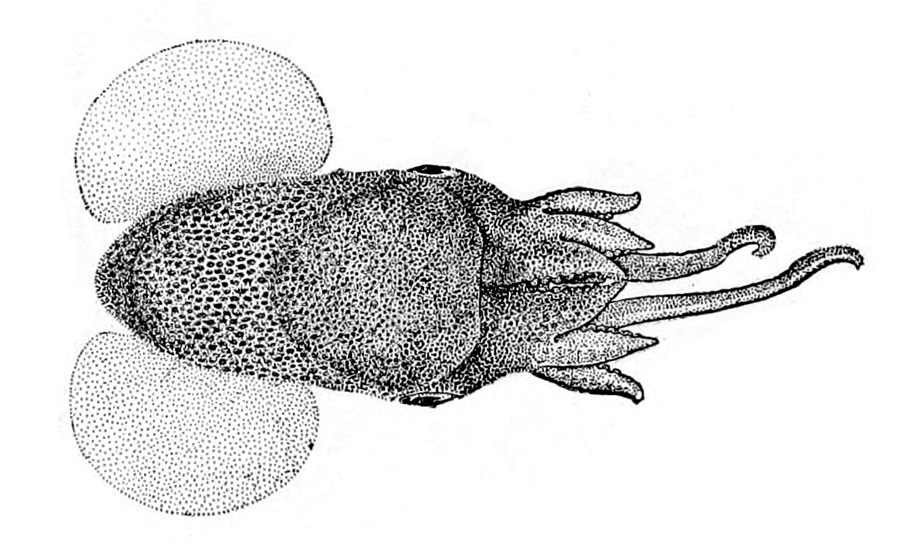
- Ventral view of type

Conservation status
- Data Deficient (IUCN 3.1)

Scientific classification
- Kingdom: Animalia
- Phylum: Mollusca
- Class: Cephalopoda
- Order: Sepiolida
- Family: Sepiolidae
- Subfamily: Heteroteuthidinae
- Genus: Heteroteuthis
- Species: H. hawaiiensis

Binomial name
- Heteroteuthis hawaiiensis (Berry, 1909)

Synonyms
- Heteroteuthis (Stephanoteuthis) hawaiiensis (S. S. Berry, 1909); Stephanoteuthis hawaiiensis Berry, 1909

= Heteroteuthis hawaiiensis =

Species of mollusc

Heteroteuthis hawaiiensis is a species of bobtail squid native to the central and western Pacific Ocean. It occurs in waters off Hawaii, Bonin, the Ryukyu Islands, Indonesia, and the Great Australian Bight. H. hawaiiensis may also be present in Banc Combe in the southwestern Pacific (12°14′S 177°28′W) at depths of 795 to 820 m.

H. hawaiiensis grows to approximately 30 mm in mantle length.

The type specimen was collected near Kauai in the Hawaiian Islands. It is deposited at the National Museum of Natural History in Washington, D.C.

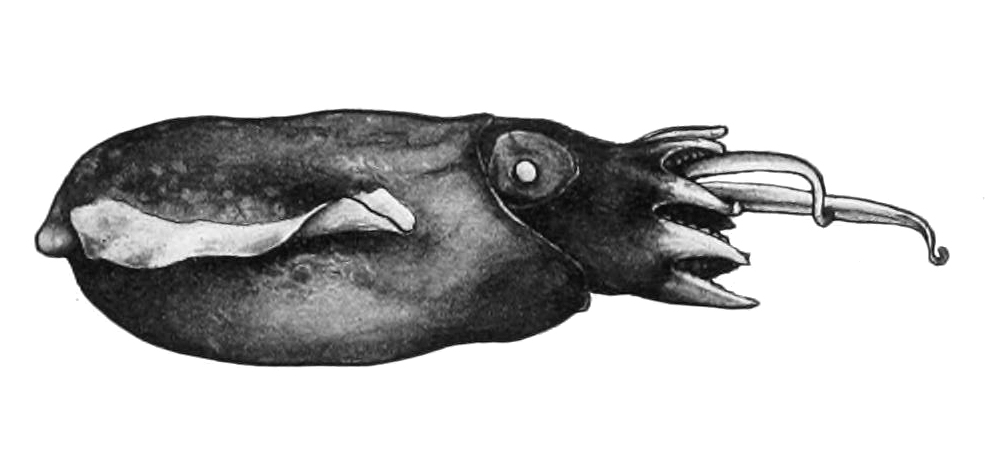
Lateral view

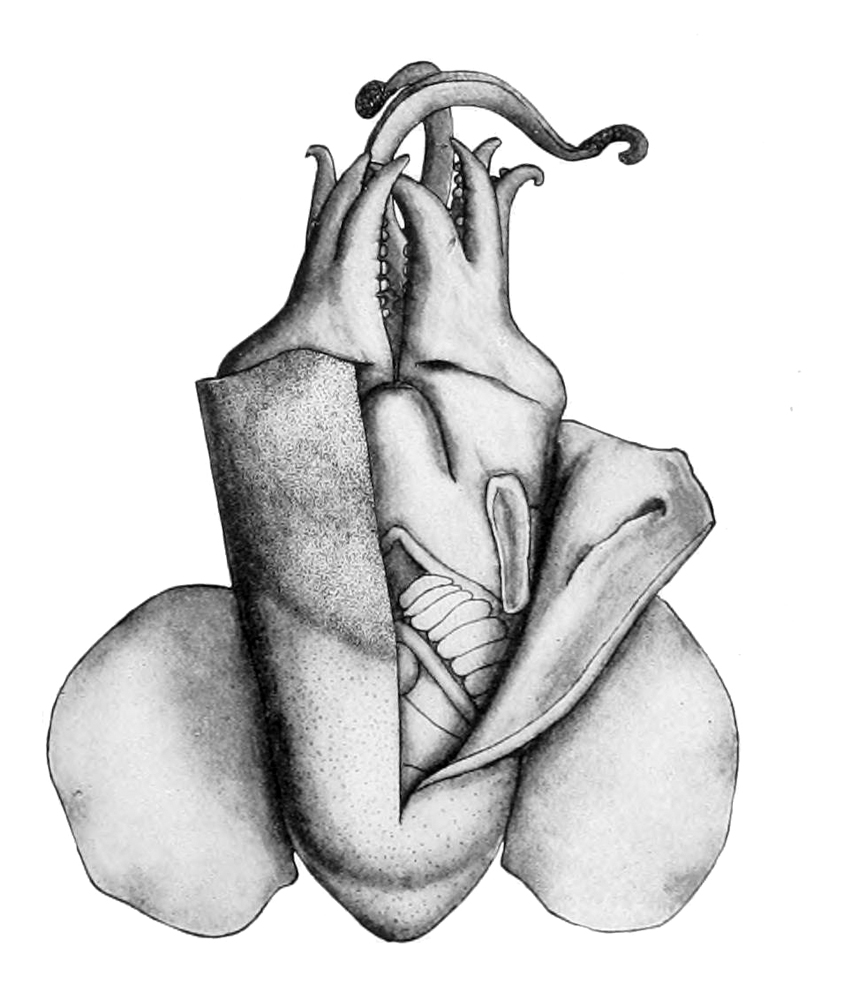
Dissected mantle
