= Marine Stewardship Council =

Fishing certifier

- Type: Nonprofit organization
- Industry: Sustainable seafood labelling
- Founded: 1996; London, United Kingdom
- Headquarters: Marine House, Snow Hill, London, EC1
- Key people: Rupert Howes (CEO); Werner Kiene (Chair of the Board of Trustees)
- Revenue: 30,096 pound sterling (2021)
- Number of employees: c. 140
- Website: www.msc.org

The Marine Stewardship Council (MSC) is a non-profit organisation which aims to set standards for sustainable fishing. Fisheries that wish to demonstrate they are well-managed and sustainable compared to the MSC's standards are assessed by a team of Conformity Assessment Bodies (CABs).

The mission of the MSC is to use its ecolabel, for which the MSC receives royalties for licensing it to products, and fishery certification program to recognise and reward sustainable fishing practices.

The MSC has faced criticism in the past, mainly centering on its close ties to the fishing industry and conflict of interest stemming from royalties received by the industry for its certification label.

== Environmental benefits ==
A study commissioned and funded by MSC found that MSC-certified fisheries show improvements that deliver benefits to the marine environment. Benefits included: increased stocks; improved management of stocks; reduced bycatch; expansion of environmentally protected areas; and increased knowledge about ecosystem impacts amongst fishers.

== Key facts and figures ==
The MSC was founded in 1996, inspired by the Grand Banks cod fishery collapse. In 1999 it became independent of its founding partners, the World Wide Fund for Nature (WWF) and Unilever. MSC has a staff of around 140 spread across the headquarters in London, regional offices in London, Seattle, Singapore and Sydney, and local offices in Edinburgh, Berlin, The Hague, Paris, Cape Town, Tokyo, Reykjavik, and the Baltic region.

Fisheries that want certification and to use the ecolabel pay US$20,000 to more than $100,000 to an independent, for-profit contractor that assesses the fishery against the MSC standard and determines whether to recommend certification. The assessors are independently accredited to perform MSC assessments by Accreditation Services International (ASI). After certification, fisheries undergo annual audits costing $75,000 per audit and are recertified every five years.

== Effect on fraud ==
As of March 2019, the use of DNA barcoding by the MSC has reduced species mislabelling (sometimes done fraudulently) to less than 1% among covered products, compared to the sector average of roughly 30%.

== Finances ==
The MSC is a registered charity and non-profit organisation and depends on various sources of funding. From 1 April 2011 to 31 March 2012, the MSC's total income was £15 million. Total expenditure for the same period was £12 million. The MSC Board recognises it as generally good practice to hold reserves as a protection against any financial difficulties in the future. A reserves target of 6 to 9 months’ cover is considered to be necessary, at least as an aspiration, given the MSC's absence of a subscribing membership and uncertainty, as a market-based program, of its various income streams.

== Independent opinion and criticisms ==
In 2009 Greenpeace published a comprehensive assessment of the MSC. Overall the report states several positive effects, but also many aspects that make the MSC a weak certification.

Jared Diamond's 2005 book Collapse discussed MSC and the similar Forest Stewardship Council as good examples of collaboration among environmentalists and businesses for a sustainable economy.

Andrew Balmford's book Wild Hope devotes a chapter to the MSC as a successful strategy for achieving conservation goals through a collaborative, market-based solution.

Critics claim that the MSC has certified fisheries that are harming the environment and those with a high level of bycatch, the killing of non-target species such as dolphins and turtles. These concerns are furthered by the fact that the industry pays the MSC to be certified, which is presented as a conflict of interest. In addition, there is no guarantee that the seafood is ethical, as animal welfare is not considered and suffocation is still the standard slaughter method for fish, who possess not only the ability to feel pain but emotions and sentience.

Since 2009, the MSC has been criticized for certifying fisheries that have, in the view of some, questionable sustainability. The most controversial certification has been that of the Ross Sea Antarctic toothfish fishery. Some scientists and stakeholders in the seafood industry consider the fishery "exploratory", since so little is known about it. However toothfish has been fished commercially for over 30 years and the fishery has been closely managed by Convention on the Conservation of Antarctic Marine Living Resources since 1982. Scientists had accused the assessor, which recommended the fishery for certification, of ignoring unfavorable data. The independent adjudicator later sent back the recommendation for certification to the assessor for reconsideration. The fishery was certified with adjustments to the scoring on the contested indicators and additional requirements for providing scientific data to aid research on toothfish stocks.

The MSC received criticism from Greenpeace and the Pew Environment Group among others over its certification of Antarctic krill. Although the fishery may have been healthy, critics believed that "scientific data on the fishery’s impact [wa]s lacking, and that the council’s decision [wa]s thus based on guesswork". As a result, Whole Foods Market stated it would stop selling all krill oil supplements even with the ecolabel.

As part of the MSC certification the krill fishery committed to further scientific research and 100% observer coverage, specifically addressing the concerns about risks posed to other species by krill fishing. Fishing pressure on krill is very low – less than 1% of estimated biomass - and the management rules established by CCAMLR ensure fishing activities minimise risks to the krill population or other species.

In early 2010, the MSC was criticised by environmental groups like the Sierra Club for certifying the British Columbia sockeye salmon fishery when stocks in the Fraser River (a part of the fishery) had been in decline since the early 1990s. The year before, the salmon run of the Fraser River (a part of the fishery) was only 1.4 million (M) of a predicted 11 M salmon and had prompted the Canadian Prime Minister Stephen Harper to launch a judicial enquiry. The 2010 run was 30 M and the 2011 run is estimated to be greater than 4 M. The Fraser Sockeye 2010 think tank at Simon Fraser University stated that the large 2010 run was due mainly to the cyclical peak of fish from the Adams River and that returns were high only for a subset of tributaries. However, it stated that "the large unresolved uncertainties […] highlight our collective uncertainty about the relative roles of climate change, aquaculture, and fisheries management in determining salmon returns".

A management response to the decreased stocks was taken and the fishery was closed to allow the stocks to recover. The fishery is now operating successfully and has an ongoing commitment to protecting weak populations and decreasing bycatch. Catch level is set in-season in accordance with each year's run size.

In February 2011, several European WWF chapters objected to certification of the Denmark North Sea plaice fishery. The concerns raised were taken into account and the fishery concerned implemented a habitat strategy to ensure enhanced protection of vulnerable habitats through measures such as closed areas, gear modifications, technical developments and targeted research.

However, in an independent study of seven different seafood ecolabelling and certification programs, commissioned by WWF International and carried out by Accenture Development Partnerships in 2009, the MSC ranked highest across all 103 criteria. The study was repeated in 2012 and the MSC again was determined ‘best in class’, scoring twice as highly as the next nearest certification program analysed.

Some scientists like Sidney Holt and Daniel Pauly have suggested that a system where assessments are carried out by commercial contractors paid by the fisheries creates a conflict of interest because assessors have a financial incentive in recommending fisheries and getting more work and profits from the resulting annual audits. Third party assessment by accredited certifiers, independent of the standard setter, is also a key feature of the United Nations FAO guidelines on ecolabelling fisheries and fish products which the MSC Fisheries Standard is based on.

In late 2016 The Times and SeafoodSource reported that a leaked internal WWF document concluded that because the MSC receives royalties from licensing its ecolabel (providing 75% of the organisation's revenue) there is a conflict of interest and it has relaxed its sustainability requirements, enabling more products to carry its label, thereby increasing its own income. The WWF writes in the report that "[the MSC] aggressively pursued global scale growth" and "has begun to reap very large sums from the fishing industry,". MSC Science and Standards Director David Agnew denied any conflict of interest and called the claims unsubstantiated. The WWF stated after the leak that the document was "a draft version of an internal document" and that "While the document was inappropriately distributed, it reflects WWF’s understanding of ongoing challenges in tuna fisheries certification in the Indian Ocean over the past five years.".

In 2018 Open Seas and the National Trust for Scotland formally objected to MSC certified scallop dredging practices.

The 2021 documentary Seaspiracy was critical of the Marine Stewardship Council, arguing it offers a false sense of assurance to consumers about the products possessing the MSC label. It cited close ties to the fishing industry and weak and ineffective certification processes.

== See also ==
- Aquaculture Stewardship Council
- Forest Stewardship Council
- Seafood Watch
- SeaChoice
