= Stoloteuthis weberi =

Conservation status
- Data Deficient (IUCN 3.1)

Scientific classification
- Kingdom: Animalia
- Phylum: Mollusca
- Class: Cephalopoda
- Order: Sepiolida
- Family: Sepiolidae
- Genus: Stoloteuthis
- Species: S. weberi

Binomial name
- Stoloteuthis weberi (Joubin, 1902)

Synonyms
- Heteroteuthis (Heteroteuthis) weberi Joubin, 1902; Heteroteuthis weberi Joubin, 1902

Species of mollusc

Stoloteuthis weberi is a species of bobtail squid native to the Indo-Pacific waters off central Indonesia.

The type specimen was collected off Indonesia and is deposited at the Muséum National d'Histoire Naturelle in Paris.
