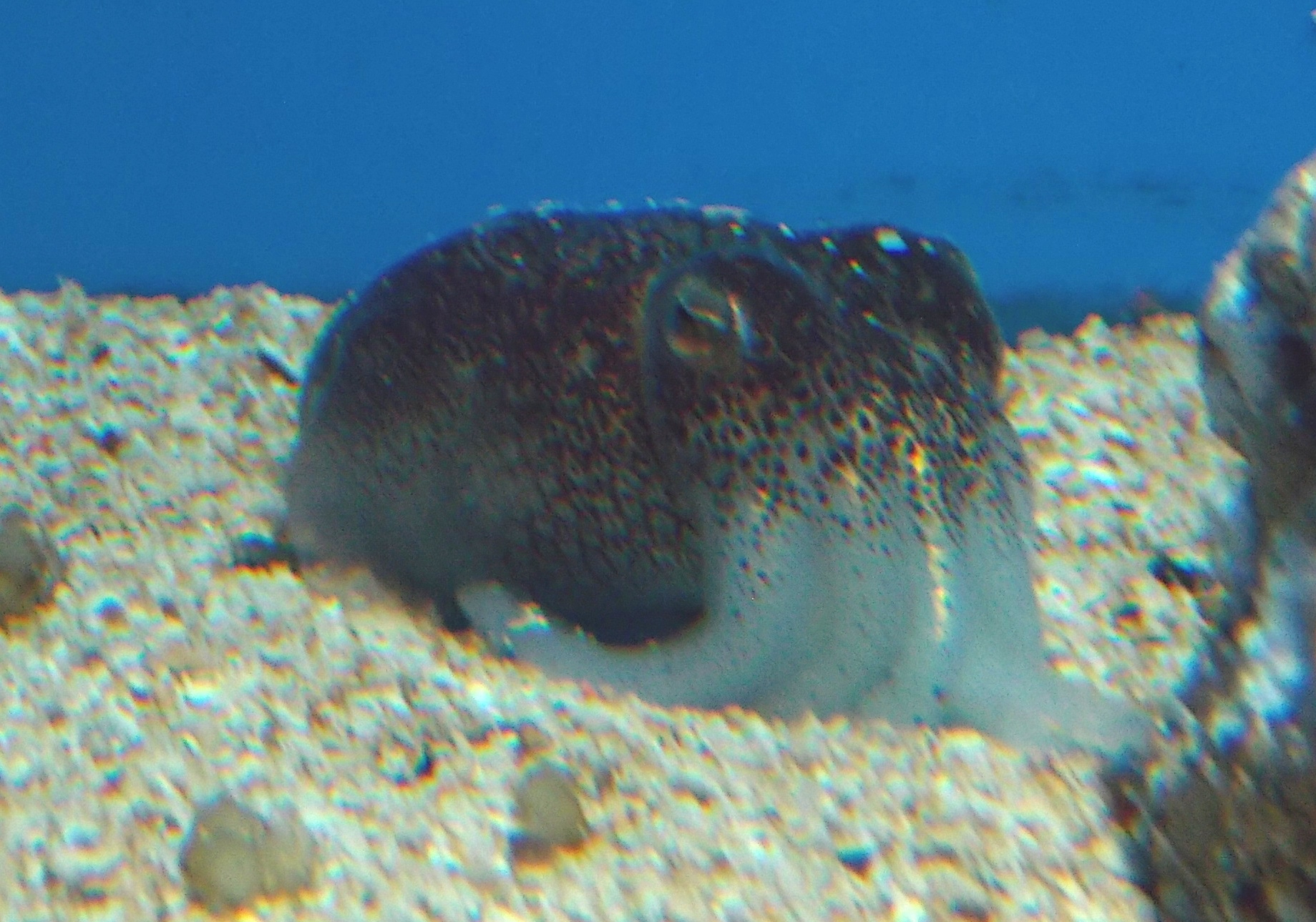

Conservation status
- Data Deficient (IUCN 3.1)

Scientific classification
- Kingdom: Animalia
- Phylum: Mollusca
- Class: Cephalopoda
- Order: Sepiolida
- Family: Sepiolidae
- Subfamily: Heteroteuthidinae
- Genus: Sepiolina
- Species: S. nipponensis

Binomial name
- Sepiolina nipponensis (Berry, 1911)

Synonyms
- Stoloteuthis nipponensis Berry, 1911

= Sepiolina nipponensis =

Species of mollusc

Sepiolina nipponensis, also known as the Japanese bobtail squid, is a bobtail squid and one of two species in the genus Sepiolina. It is found in the Western Pacific in apparently widely separated populations, the most southerly of which is in the Great Australian Bight in South Australia and Western Australia, and there are populations from the Philippines northwards to Taiwan, Fujian and southern Honshū.

== Description ==
The maximum size of adult Japanese bobtail squid is 2.5 cm in mantle length. The body consists of large fins and a short and dome-shaped mantle surrounded by an iridescent belt. The mantle cavity contains subcordate luminous organs. The arms are subequal with biserial suckers.
