= Leucoptera =

Leucoptera, "white-winged" in Latin, may refer to:

- Leucoptera (plant), a genus of plants in the family Asteraceae
- Leucoptera (moth), a genus of moths
- Punta di Pellaro also known as Leucoptera, is the extreme southwestern point of mainland Italy, in the region of Calabria
