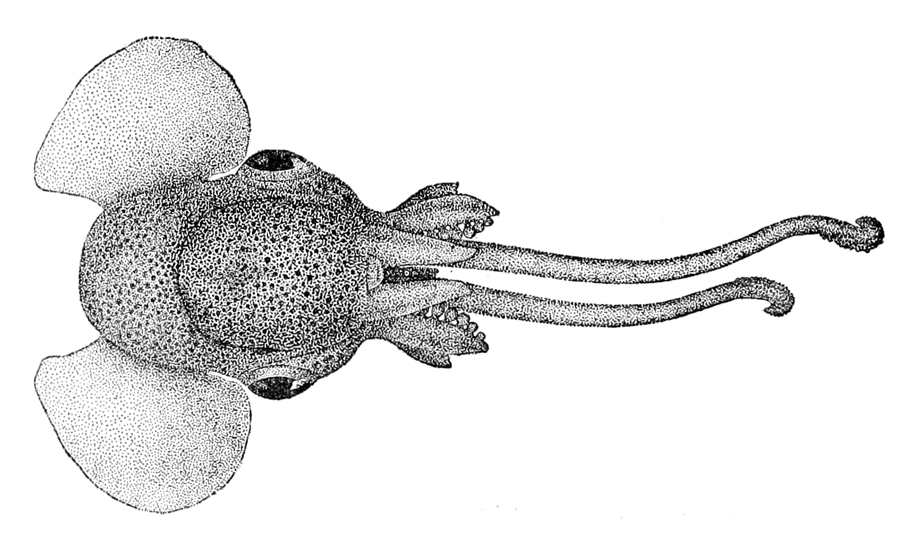
- Ventral view of type
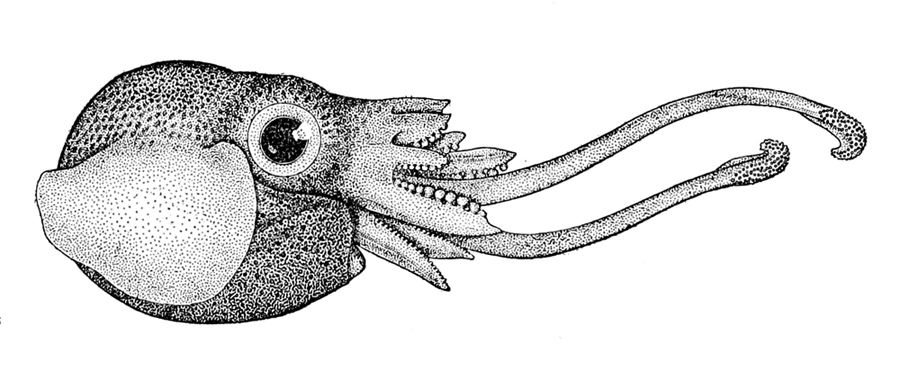
- Lateral view of type

Conservation status
- Data Deficient (IUCN 3.1)

Scientific classification
- Kingdom: Animalia
- Phylum: Mollusca
- Class: Cephalopoda
- Order: Sepiolida
- Family: Sepiolidae
- Subfamily: Heteroteuthidinae
- Genus: Stoloteuthis
- Species: S. maoria

Binomial name
- Stoloteuthis maoria (Dell, 1959)

Synonyms
- Iridioteuthis maoria Dell, 1959; Iridoteuthis maoria Dell, 1959

= Stoloteuthis maoria =

Species of mollusc

Stoloteuthis maoria is a species of bobtail squid native to the southwestern Pacific Ocean. It occurs in Cook Strait and Chatham Rise off North Island in New Zealand, and has also been recorded from the Nazca and Sala y Gomez submarine ridges in the eastern Pacific.

S. maoria has very large eyes and protruding fins. The length of the mantle and head—excluding the tentacles—is up to 38 mm, and the width including fins is up to 36 mm.

The type specimen was collected off New Zealand and is deposited at the National Museum of New Zealand in Wellington.
