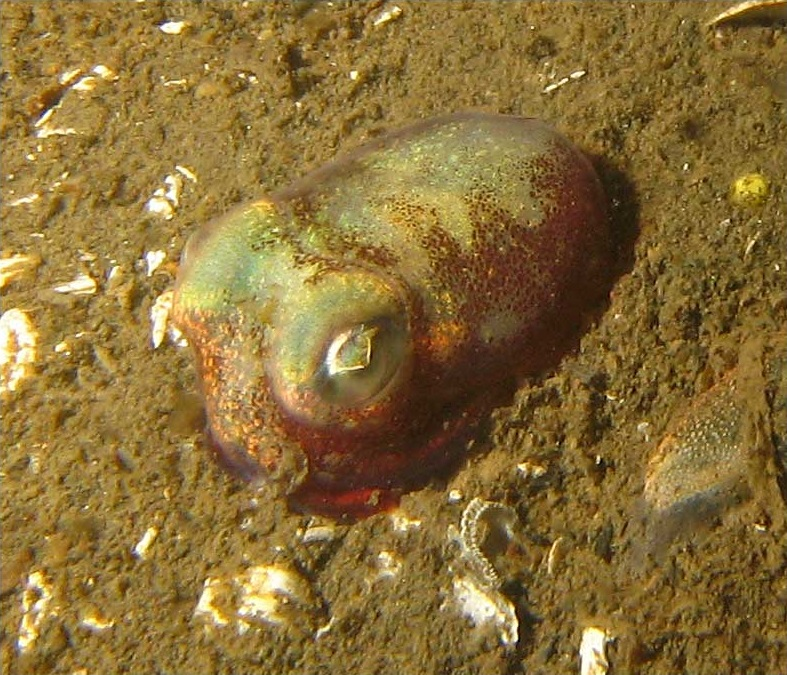
- Rossia pacifica

Scientific classification
- Kingdom: Animalia
- Phylum: Mollusca
- Class: Cephalopoda
- Order: Sepiolida
- Family: Sepiolidae
- Subfamily: Rossiinae; Appellöf, 1898

Genera
- Austrorossia; Neorossia; Rossia; Semirossia

= Rossiinae =

Subfamily of molluscs

Rossiinae is a subfamily of bobtail squid encompassing four genera and twenty species.

== Classification ==
- Subfamily Rossiinae
  - Genus Austrorossia
    - Austrorossia antillensis, Antilles bobtail squid
    - Austrorossia australis
    - Austrorossia bipapillata
    - Austrorossia enigmatica
    - Austrorossia mastigophora
  - Genus Neorossia
    - Neorossia caroli, Carol bobtail
    - Neorossia leptodons
  - Genus Rossia
    - Rossia brachyura
    - Rossia bullisi, Gulf bobtail squid
    - Rossia glaucopis
    - Rossia macrosoma, stout bobtail
    - Rossia megaptera, big-fin bobtail squid
    - Rossia moelleri
    - Rossia mollicella
    - Rossia pacifica
      - Rossia pacifica diegensis
      - Rossia pacifica pacifica, North Pacific bobtail squid
    - Rossia palpebrosa, warty bobtail squid
    - Rossia tortugaensis, Tortugas bobtail squid
  - Genus Semirossia
    - Semirossia equalis, greater bobtail squid
    - Semirossia patagonica
    - Semirossia tenera, lesser bobtail squid
