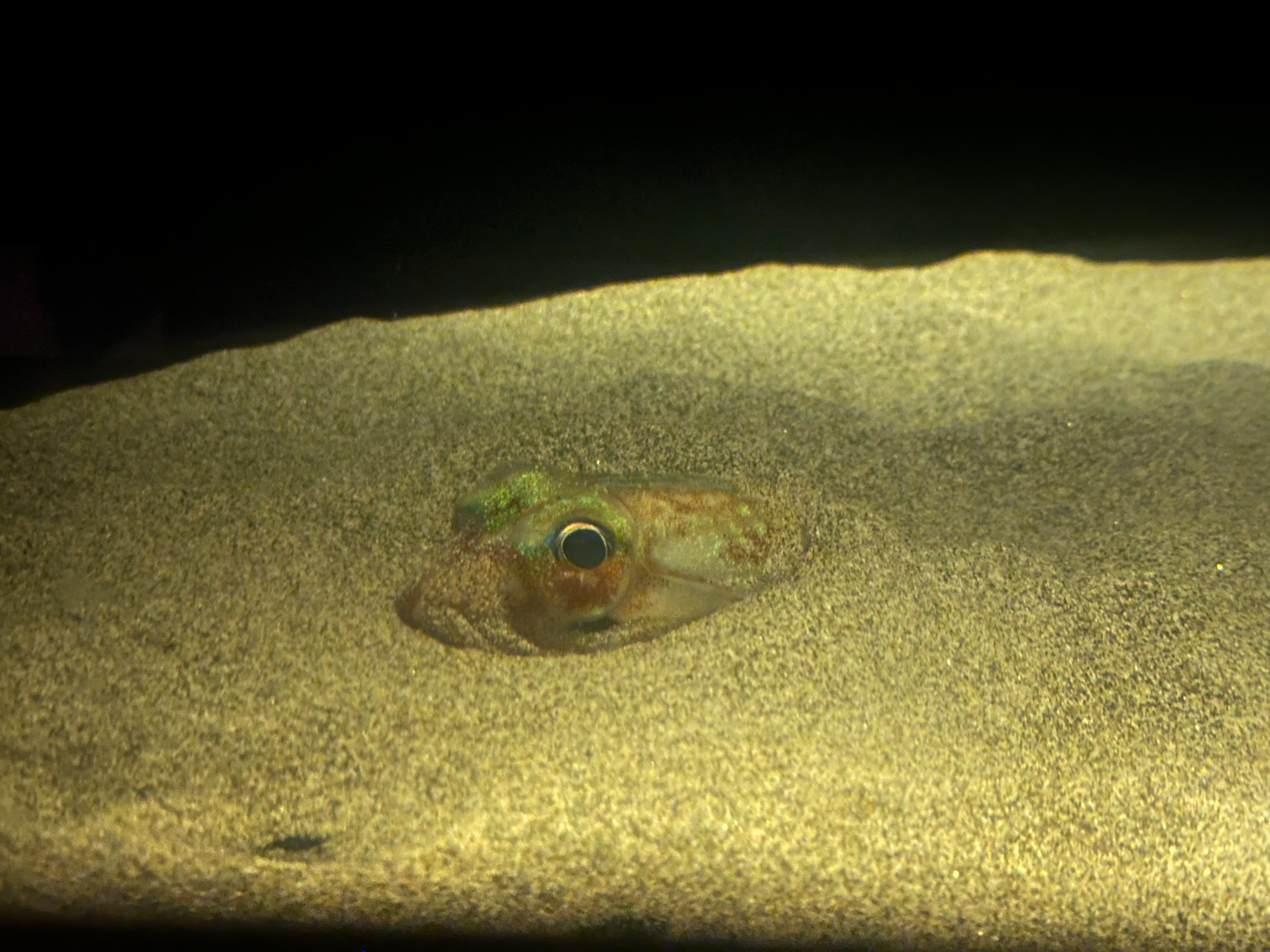

Conservation status
- Data Deficient (IUCN 3.1)

Scientific classification
- Kingdom: Animalia
- Phylum: Mollusca
- Class: Cephalopoda
- Order: Sepiolida
- Family: Sepiolidae
- Subfamily: Rossiinae
- Genus: Rossia
- Species: R. pacifica

Binomial name
- Rossia pacifica Berry, 1911

= Rossia pacifica =

Species of cephalopod known as the stubby squid

Rossia pacifica, also known as the stubby squid, is a species of bobtail squid native to the northern Pacific Ocean. Sightings usually occur in winter on sandy slopes away from strong currents in moderately shallow water. In the summer, they move to deeper waters where they reproduce. The female cements the egg capsules under a stone or in some other concealed location, and both male and female die soon after breeding.

== Subspecies ==
Two subspecies are recognised:

- Rossia pacifica diegensis Berry, 1911
- Rossia pacifica pacifica Berry, 1911

== Description ==
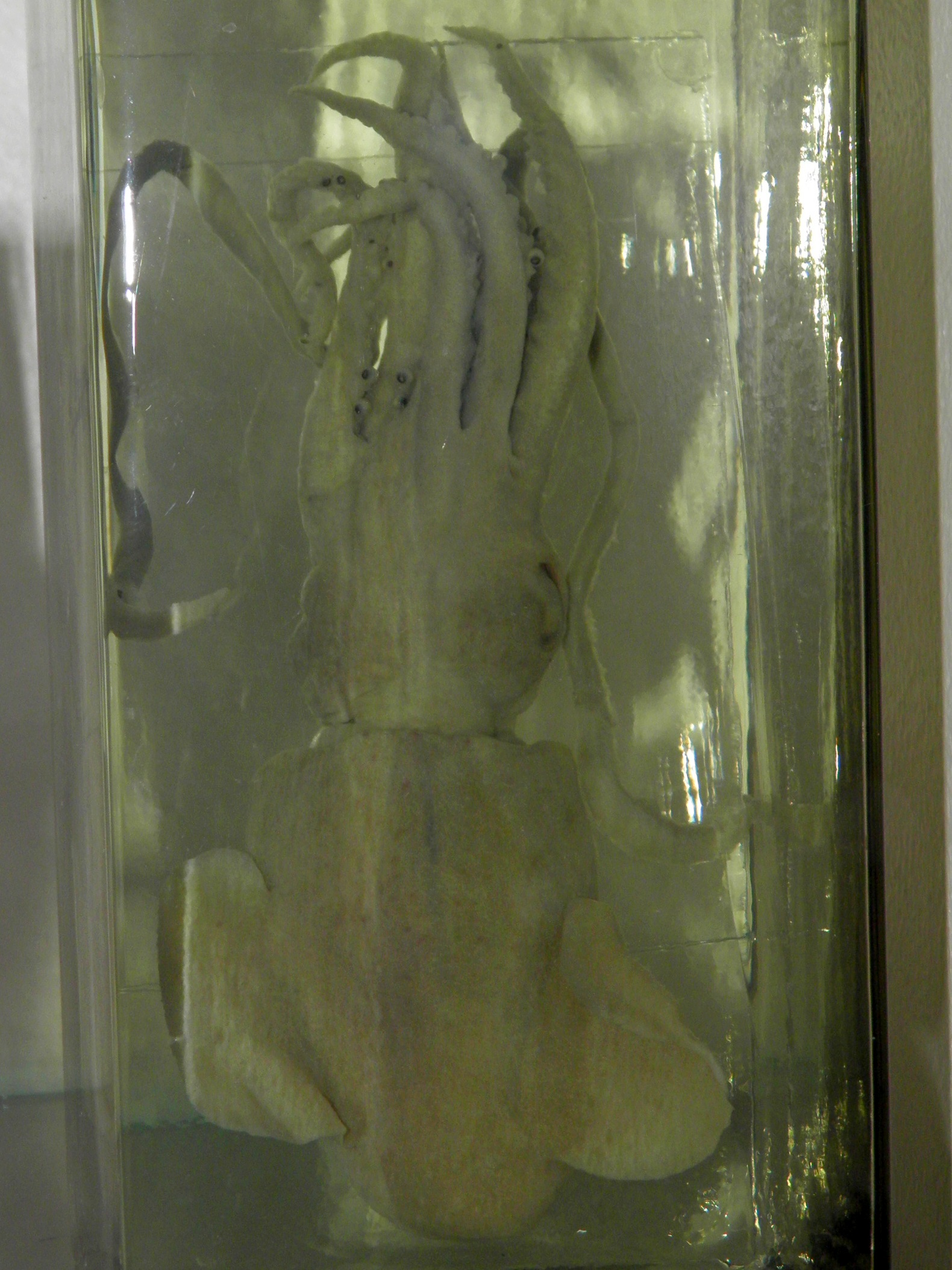
Preserved specimen

The stubby squid is a small species growing to a maximum mantle length of about 5 cm (2.0 in) and a total length of 11 cm (4.3 in), with females being larger than males. The head bears eight short arms, a pair of retractable tentacles and two large eyes. The first pair of arms is shorter than the others and the third pair the longest. The arms are circular in cross-section and each bears up to four rows of suckers on the middle section and two rows elsewhere. The tentacles have club-shaped tips with suckers and retract into pits in the head. They can be as long as the body when fully extended. The mantle (body) is not fused to the head and is flattened dorso-ventrally and rounded at the back. It does not contain the cuttlefish bone typical of cuttlefish in the family Sepiidae. There are two large semi-circular fins with wide bases on either side of the mantle. The upper surface of this bobtail squid is normally a reddish-brown colour with a scattering of small brown or yellowish spots, but can change to greyish-green when the animal is startled.

== Distribution and habitat ==
The stubby squid is native to the northern Pacific Ocean. Its range extends from Korea, Japan and the Bering Sea to the western coast of North America, as far south as California. Its depth range is 20 to 1,300 m (66 to 4,265 ft). Monterey Bay Aquarium Research Institute (MBARI) researchers were the first to report a sighting of a stubby squid at 1,300 m (4,300 ft), deeper than the previously known observation at 900 m (3,000 ft). In Puget Sound it is seen in winter in regions of sloping muddy sand away from strong currents at less than 300 m (984 ft) but moves into deeper water in the summer. When found in coastal regions it has been typically reported in the sub-tidal zone (16–370 m) and has been found at night swimming at shore in the intertidal zone.

== Behaviour ==
The stubby squid usually rests on the seabed and moves around, either by movement of its fins or by expelling a jet of water from its body cavity through a movable funnel just below the head. When disturbed, it can leave behind a thick blob of black ink as it speeds away by jet propulsion. It is nocturnal and spends the day semi-buried in soft sediment on the seabed. To submerge itself, it directs a stream of water at the sand to create a funnel-shaped depression, then it settles in the hollow and scoops sand over itself with a pair of arms, just leaving the eyes exposed. While immobile, it folds its arms under its head.

=== Feeding habits ===
The stubby squid has a hardened beak it uses to eat, its mouth is centered on the body and all tentacles connect at this point as well. It has adapted to a carnivorous diet by using a raptorial style of hunting. The squid will use its specialized eyes to locate the prey and then attack with its tentacles. More than 80% of their diet is shrimps but they also consume small crabs, mysida, fish and other cephalopods.

== Reproduction ==
Breeding takes place in late summer and autumn in deep water. The male will transfer the spermatophores (bundles of sperm) into the female's mantle cavity with his hectocotylus, first left arm. The mature male and female die soon after breeding, having lived for about two years. The average female will deposit between twenty-five and fifty eggs in clusters, attaching them to the underside of stones, clams or sponges. The capsules, hard, durable, and creamy-white in color, take four to nine months to hatch and receive no additional care. The egg itself (4–5 mm in diameter), is contained in a larger capsule (8 mm by 15 mm). The juveniles that emerge are miniature versions of the adults.

== See also ==
- Octopus squid
