= Rossia moelleri =

Conservation status
- Least Concern (IUCN 3.1)

Scientific classification
- Kingdom: Animalia
- Phylum: Mollusca
- Class: Cephalopoda
- Order: Sepiolida
- Family: Sepiolidae
- Subfamily: Rossiinae
- Genus: Rossia
- Species: R. moelleri

Binomial name
- Rossia moelleri Steenstrup, 1856

Species of mollusc

Rossia moelleri is a species of bobtail squid native to the northern Atlantic Ocean and the Arctic Ocean, eastward to the Laptev Sea and westward to Amundsen Bay. It occurs off western and north-eastern Greenland, north-eastern Canada, Labrador, Spitsbergen, Jan Mayen, and in the Kara Sea. R. moelleri lives at depths from 17 to 250 m.

R. moelleri grows to 50 mm in mantle length.

In Norwegian waters, R. moelleri is preyed upon by haddock (Melanogrammus aeglefinus) and Atlantic cod (Gadus morhua).

The type specimen was collected off Greenland. It was originally deposited at the Zoologisk Museum of Kobenhavns Universitet in Copenhagen, but is no longer extant.
