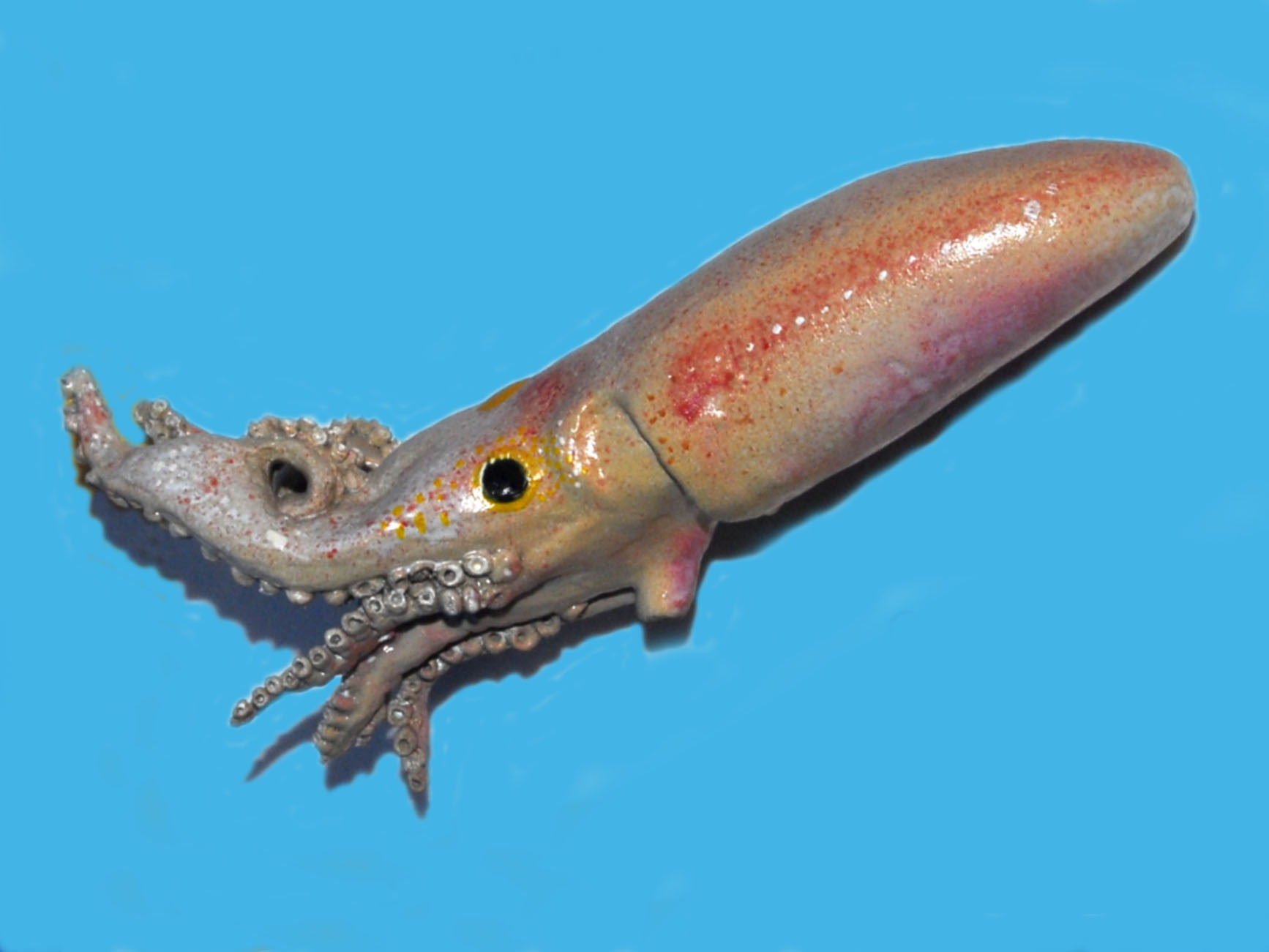
- Museum model of Neorossia caroli

Conservation status
- Least Concern (IUCN 3.1)

Scientific classification
- Kingdom: Animalia
- Phylum: Mollusca
- Class: Cephalopoda
- Order: Sepiolida
- Family: Sepiolidae
- Subfamily: Rossiinae
- Genus: Neorossia
- Species: N. caroli

Binomial name
- Neorossia caroli (Joubin, 1902)

Synonyms
- Rossia caroli Joubin, 1902

= Neorossia caroli =

Species of mollusc

Neorossia caroli, the Carol bobtail squid, is a species of bobtail squid belonging to the family Sepiolidae.

== Etymology ==
The species name caroli derives from Carolus, Latinized name of Carlos. It honors H. M. the King don Carlos of Portugal.

== Subspecies ==
Subspecies include:

- N. c. jeannae (southwest Atlantic)
- N. c. caroli (northeast, east, and southeast Atlantic)

== Distribution and habitat ==
This species is widespread in the Atlantic Ocean from Iceland and the United Kingdom southwards along the Atlantic coast of Europe and Africa as far south as Namibia, the Patagonian slope, and Falkland Islands. It is also present in the Mediterranean and Black Seas. This bottom-living species occurs in areas of muddy substrate at depths of 40 to 1744 m.

== Description ==
N. caroli can reach a mantle length of 51 mm in males, while in females, the mantle length can attain 83 mm. Its body is soft and fleshy, and the mantle is broad and oval. The dorsal border of the mantle is not fused to the head. Arms have two rows of suckers. The ink sac is not functional.

== Biology ==
These squids usually bury in muddy substrate during the day, emerging only at night to feed. During copulation, the male inserts the arm (hectocotylus) specialized to store and transfer spermatophores into the female's mantle cavity. Spawning occurs throughout the year. The eggs are violet and rather large. They are attached to hard substrates. Males and females usually die after spawning and brooding.
