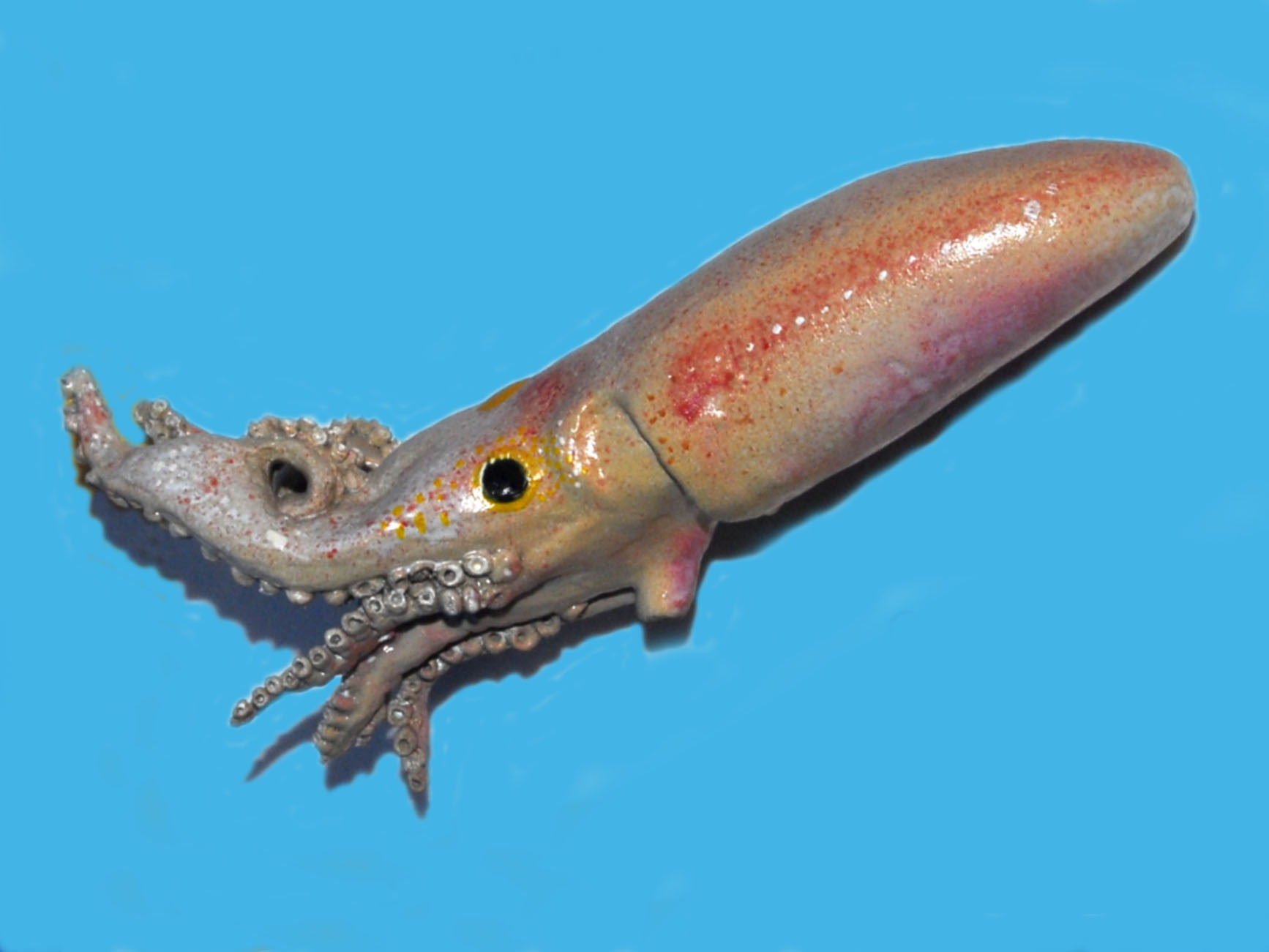
- Neorossia caroli. Museum model

Scientific classification
- Kingdom: Animalia
- Phylum: Mollusca
- Class: Cephalopoda
- Order: Sepiolida
- Family: Sepiolidae
- Subfamily: Rossiinae
- Genus: Neorossia; Boletzky, 1971

Type species
- Rossia caroli Joubin, 1902

Species
- See text.

= Neorossia =

Genus of molluscs

Neorossia is a genus of bobtail squid comprising two species.

== Species ==
- Neorossia caroli Joubin, 1902, Carol bobtail
- Neorossia leptodons Reid, 1992
