= Rossia brachyura =

Conservation status
- Data Deficient (IUCN 3.1)

Scientific classification
- Kingdom: Animalia
- Phylum: Mollusca
- Class: Cephalopoda
- Order: Sepiolida
- Family: Sepiolidae
- Subfamily: Rossiinae
- Genus: Rossia
- Species: R. brachyura

Binomial name
- Rossia brachyura Verrill, 1883

Species of mollusc

Rossia brachyura is a species of bobtail squid native to the tropical western Atlantic Ocean, specifically the Greater and Lesser Antilles.

A. E. Verrill described a female R. brachyura specimen measuring 18 mm in mantle length (given as "length of body, above").

The type specimen was collected in the Caribbean Sea. It is deposited at the Museum of Comparative Zoology of Harvard University, although the location given for the type specimen has not been recently confirmed.
