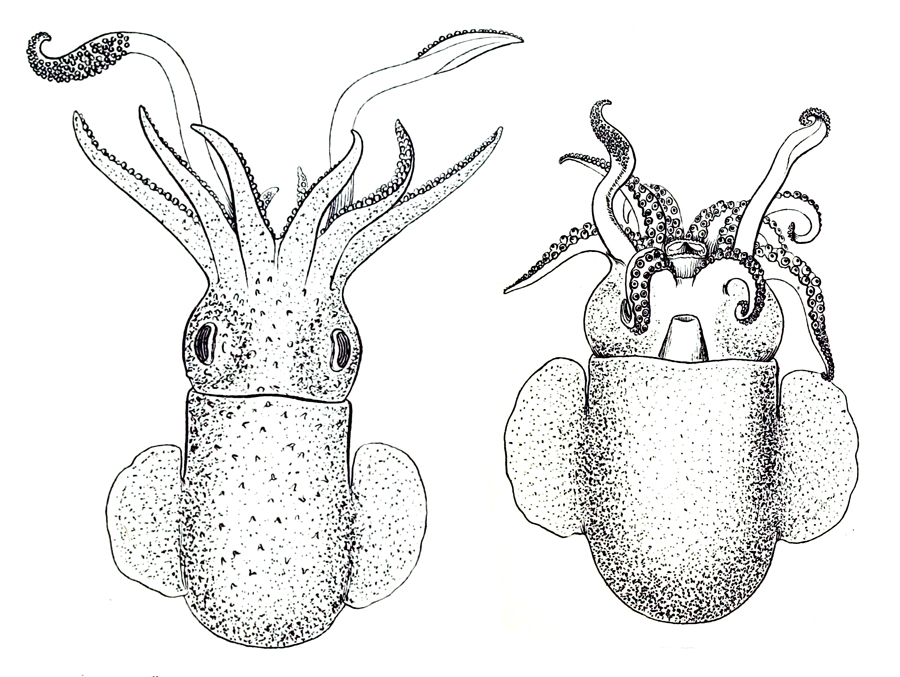

Conservation status
- Data Deficient (IUCN 3.1)

Scientific classification
- Kingdom: Animalia
- Phylum: Mollusca
- Class: Cephalopoda
- Order: Sepiolida
- Family: Sepiolidae
- Subfamily: Rossiinae
- Genus: Rossia
- Species: R. glaucopis

Binomial name
- Rossia glaucopis Lovén, 1845

Synonyms
- Allorossia glaucopis (Lóven, 1845); Rossia hyatti A. E. Verrill, 1878; Rossia sublaevis A. E. Verrill, 1878

= Rossia glaucopis =

Species of mollusc

Rossia glaucopis is a species of bobtail squid native to the south-eastern Pacific Ocean, specifically the waters around Chile.

The type specimen was collected off Chile. The type repository is unknown.

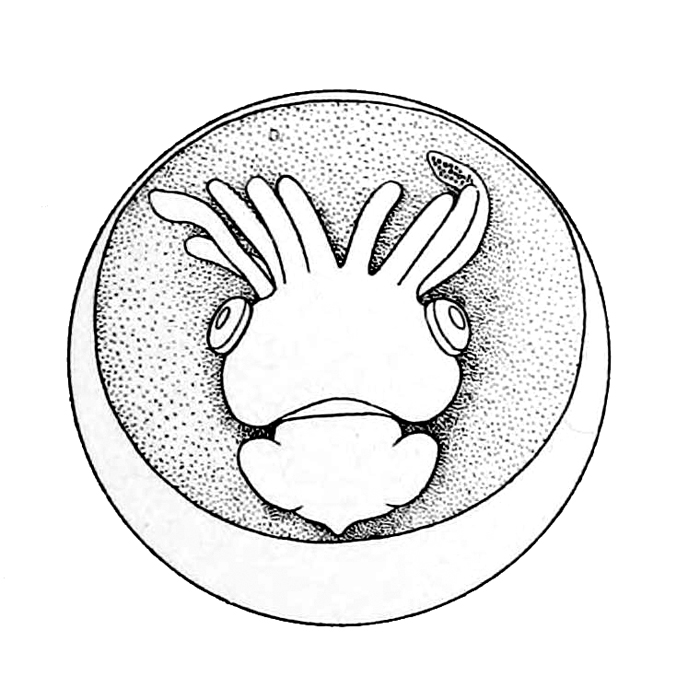
Embryo in egg

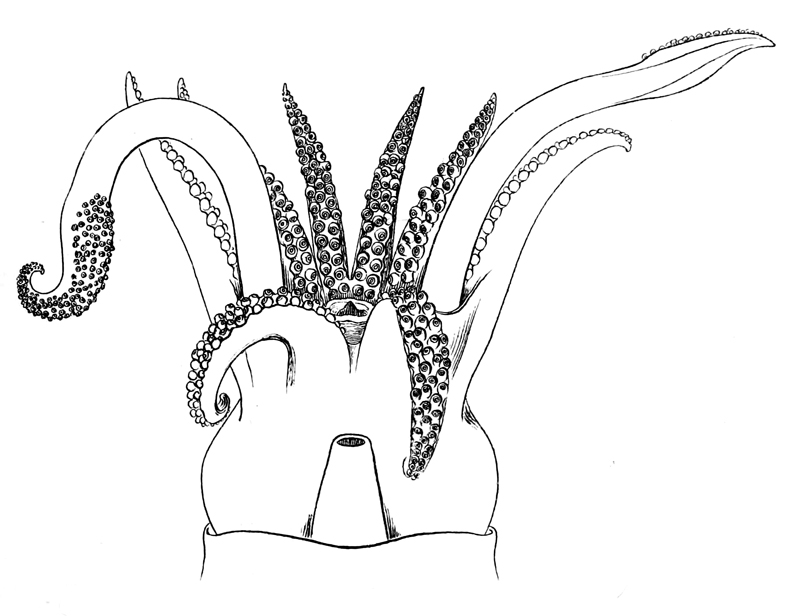
Head and limbs

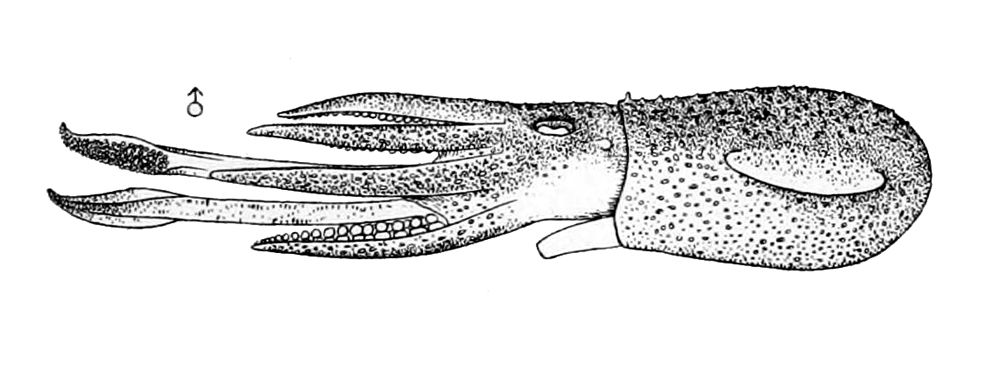
Lateral view of male
