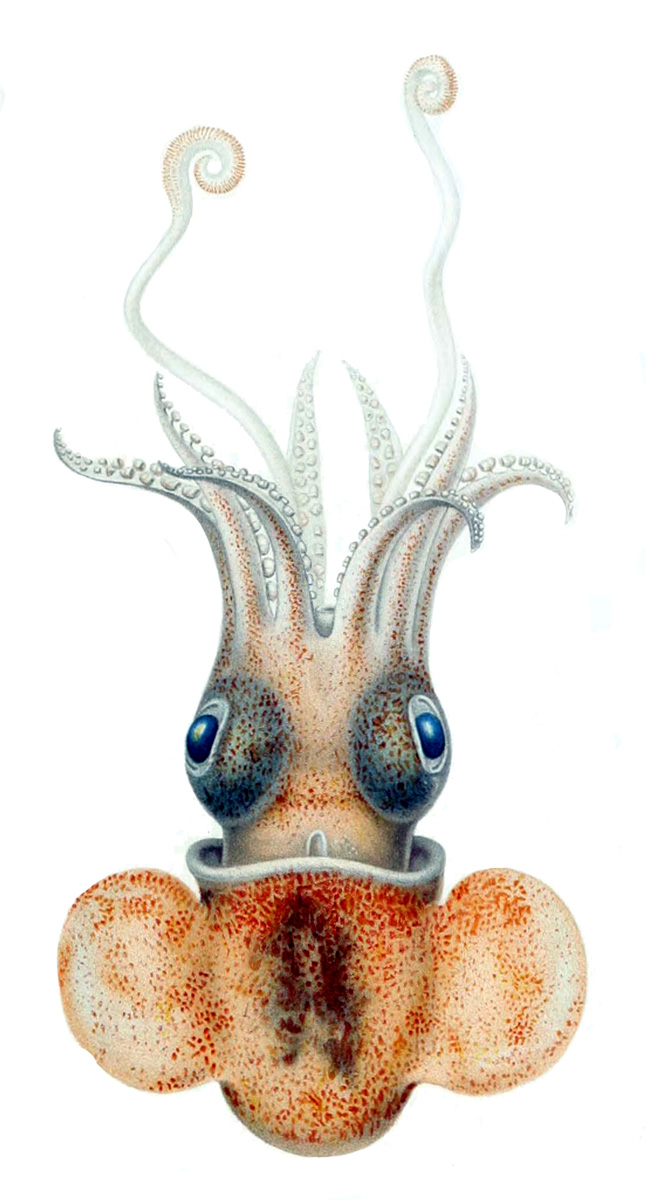
- Female Austrorossia mastigophora (ca. 45 mm ML) from the east African coast

Conservation status
- Least Concern (IUCN 3.1)

Scientific classification
- Kingdom: Animalia
- Phylum: Mollusca
- Class: Cephalopoda
- Order: Sepiolida
- Family: Sepiolidae
- Subfamily: Rossiinae
- Genus: Austrorossia
- Species: A. mastigophora

Binomial name
- Austrorossia mastigophora (Chun, 1915)

Synonyms
- Rossia mastigophora Chun, 1915

= Austrorossia mastigophora =

Species of mollusc

Austrorossia mastigophora is a species of bobtail squid native to western, southern and eastern Africa, from Guinea and Somalia to the Cape of Good Hope. A doubtful record of this species exists from Chile. It lives at depths to approximately 640 m.

On average, females are larger than males; they grow to 46 mm and 31 mm in mantle length, respectively.

The type specimen was collected in the Indian Ocean near the east African coast (0°27′S 42°47′E) by the Valdivia Expedition and the species was described by the leader of that expedition, Carl Chun, the description being published in 1915. It is deposited in the Zoological Collection of the Natural History Museum, Berlin.

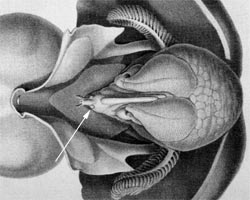
Mantle cavity of a mature female. Arrow points to the epirenal body, the function of which is unknown.

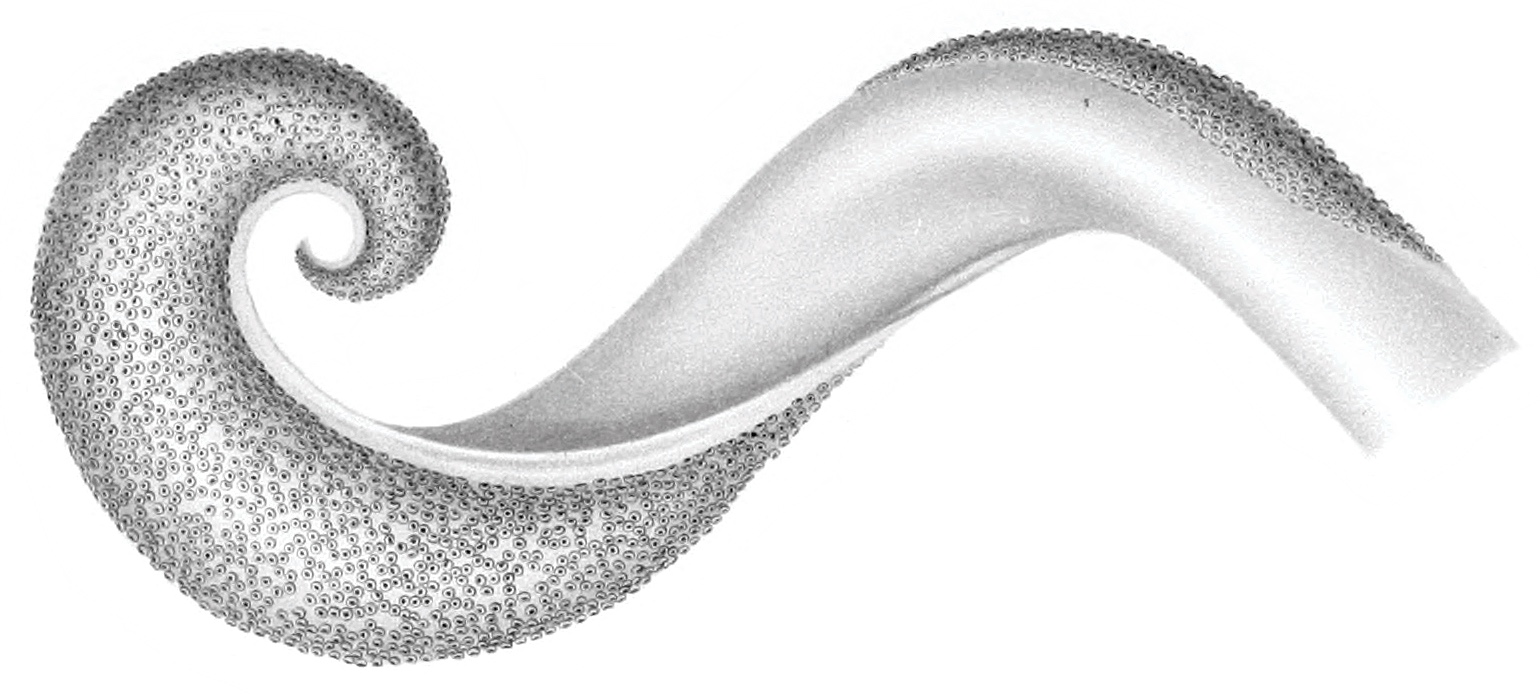
Twisted tentacular club of the same specimen.
