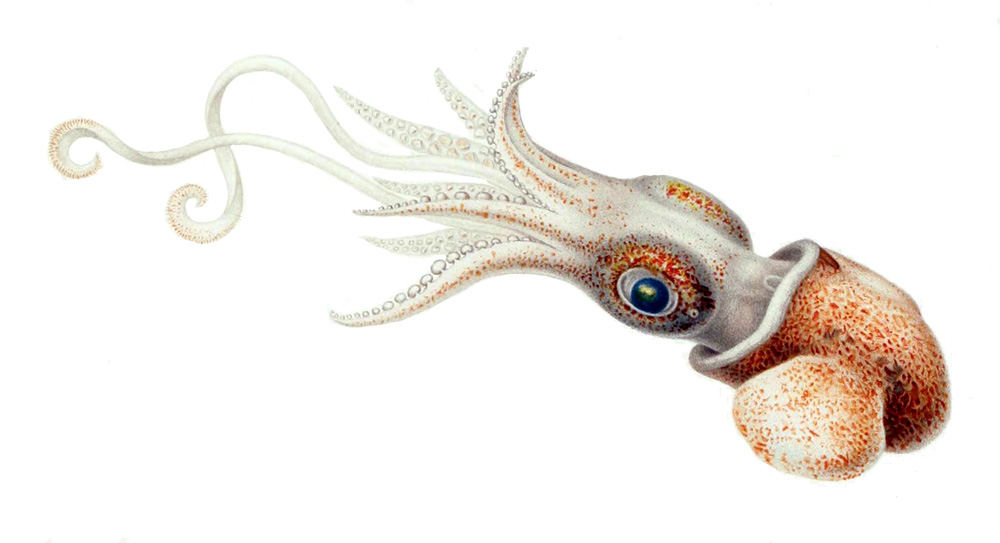
- Austrorossia mastigophora

Scientific classification
- Kingdom: Animalia
- Phylum: Mollusca
- Class: Cephalopoda
- Order: Sepiolida
- Family: Sepiolidae
- Subfamily: Rossiinae
- Genus: Austrorossia; Berry, 1918

Type species
- Rossia (Austrorossia) australis Berry, 1918

Species
- See text

Synonyms
- Rossia (Austrorossia) S. S. Berry, 1918

= Austrorossia =

Genus of molluscs

Austrorossia is a genus of bobtail squid encompassing five species.

== Species ==
- Austrorossia antillensis, Antilles bobtail squid
- Austrorossia australis
- Austrorossia bipapillata
- Austrorossia enigmatica
- Austrorossia mastigophora
