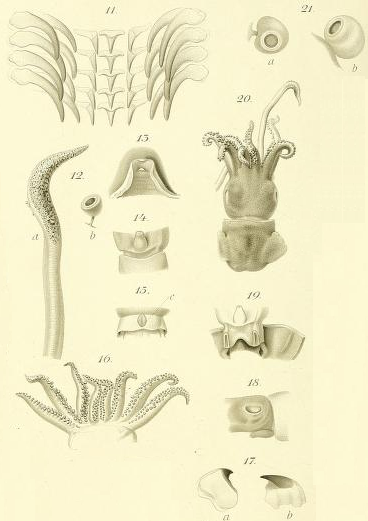

Conservation status
- Least Concern (IUCN 3.1)

Scientific classification
- Kingdom: Animalia
- Phylum: Mollusca
- Class: Cephalopoda
- Order: Sepiolida
- Family: Sepiolidae
- Subfamily: Rossiinae
- Genus: Rossia
- Species: R. palpebrosa

Binomial name
- Rossia palpebrosa Owen, 1834

= Rossia palpebrosa =

Species of mollusc

Rossia palpebrosa, also known as the warty bobtail squid, is a species of bobtail squid native to the northern Atlantic Ocean.

The type locality is simply given as "Arctic Regions". The type specimen is deposited at The Natural History Museum in London, although the location given for the type specimen has not been recently confirmed.

== Description ==
R. palpebrosa is a small squid growing to approximately 45 mm (2 in) in mantle length. The mantle is rounded posteriorly and not fused with the head dorsally. The head is wide, and it and mantle are covered in tubercles which are often large and widely distributed but, in juveniles and as a local variant, they are small and not easily observable. The mantle cavity is divided by a muscular septum. The fins are kidney-shaped and set obliquely. There is often a luminous organ on the ink sac. The tentacles are retractable and have straight, clearly defined clubs. The suckers on the clubs are arranged in about eight rows and are all much the same size. The arms are short but powerful and there are two rows of suckers in the mid part of each arm.

== Distribution ==
R. palpebrosa ranges from Baffin Bay in the Canadian Arctic south to South Carolina (32°N ) in the western Atlantic, and from Iceland, Spitzbergen, Scotland, Barents Sea and the Kara Sea to the North Sea and off Ireland (51°N) in the eastern Atlantic. It usually lives at depths between 75 and 550 m. It is a benthic species and has a wide depth range, sometimes coming to within 10 m. of the surface in the fiords of north Norway and being recorded as deep as 1250 m.

== Biology ==
Fertilisation is internal and communal clusters of large numbers of eggs are laid. Each egg measures 7 to 10 mm (0.3 to 0.4 in) in diameter and they are laid in spring and summer in the tissues of certain silicaceous sponges in the class Demospongiae. The food of this squid consists mainly of small crustaceans as well as fish and smaller squid. R. palpebrosa is itself eaten by larger fish and various marine mammals.
