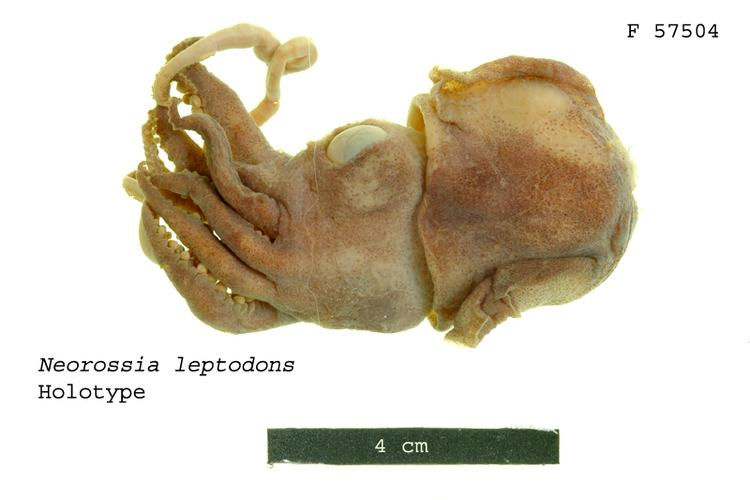
- An image of a Neorossia leptodons taken in South Australia

Conservation status
- Data Deficient (IUCN 3.1)

Scientific classification
- Kingdom: Animalia
- Phylum: Mollusca
- Class: Cephalopoda
- Order: Sepiolida
- Family: Sepiolidae
- Subfamily: Rossiinae
- Genus: Neorossia
- Species: N. leptodons

Binomial name
- Neorossia leptodons Reid, 1992

= Neorossia leptodons =

Species of mollusc

Neorossia leptodons is a species of bobtail squid native to the southwestern Pacific Ocean, from New South Wales (32°08′S 153°07′E) to South Australia (33°58′S 131°22′E). It lives at depths from 130 to 1,110 m.

N. leptodons exhibits sexual dimorphism. Females grow to 77.5 mm in mantle length (ML), while males are not known to exceed 42 mm ML.

The type specimen was collected in the Great Australian Bight, South Australia (37°18.81′S 138°36.3′E to 37°17.76′S 138°35.01′E). It is deposited at the Museum of Victoria in Melbourne.
