= Rossia pacifica diegensis =

Scientific classification
- Kingdom: Animalia
- Phylum: Mollusca
- Class: Cephalopoda
- Order: Sepiolida
- Family: Sepiolidae
- Genus: Rossia
- Species: R. pacifica
- Subspecies: R. p. diegensis

Trinomial name
- Rossia pacifica diegensis Berry, 1912

Subspecies of mollusc

Rossia pacifica diegensis is a subspecies of bobtail squid native to the eastern Pacific Ocean off Santa Catalina Basin, California. It occurs at greater depths than its sister taxon R. p. pacifica.

R. p. diegensis grows to 30 mm (1 1/6 inches) in mantle length. This subspecies is smaller and more delicate in structure than R. p. pacifica. Relative to its mantle size, it possesses larger fins and arm suckers, the latter being predominantly arranged in two rows.

The type specimen was collected off California and is deposited at the National Museum of Natural History in Washington, D.C.

The validity of R. p. diegensis has been questioned.
