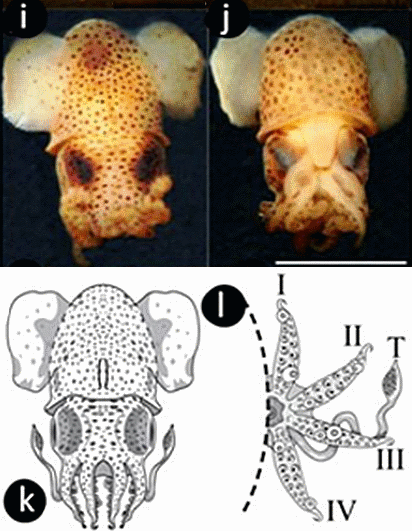

Conservation status
- Least Concern (IUCN 3.1)

Scientific classification
- Kingdom: Animalia
- Phylum: Mollusca
- Class: Cephalopoda
- Order: Sepiolida
- Family: Sepiolidae
- Subfamily: Rossiinae
- Genus: Semirossia
- Species: S. patagonica

Binomial name
- Semirossia patagonica (Smith, 1881)

Synonyms
- Rossia patagonica Smith, 1881

= Semirossia patagonica =

Species of mollusc

Semirossia patagonica is a species of bobtail squid native to the south-western Atlantic Ocean and south-eastern Pacific Ocean; it occurs around the southern part of South America and has been recorded from waters off Chile, Anegada Bay, Tierra del Fuego, Argentina, and the Falkland Islands.

The type specimen measures 21 mm in mantle length (given as "Length of body 21 millims.").

The type specimen was collected off Patagonia, Argentina and is deposited at The Natural History Museum in London.
