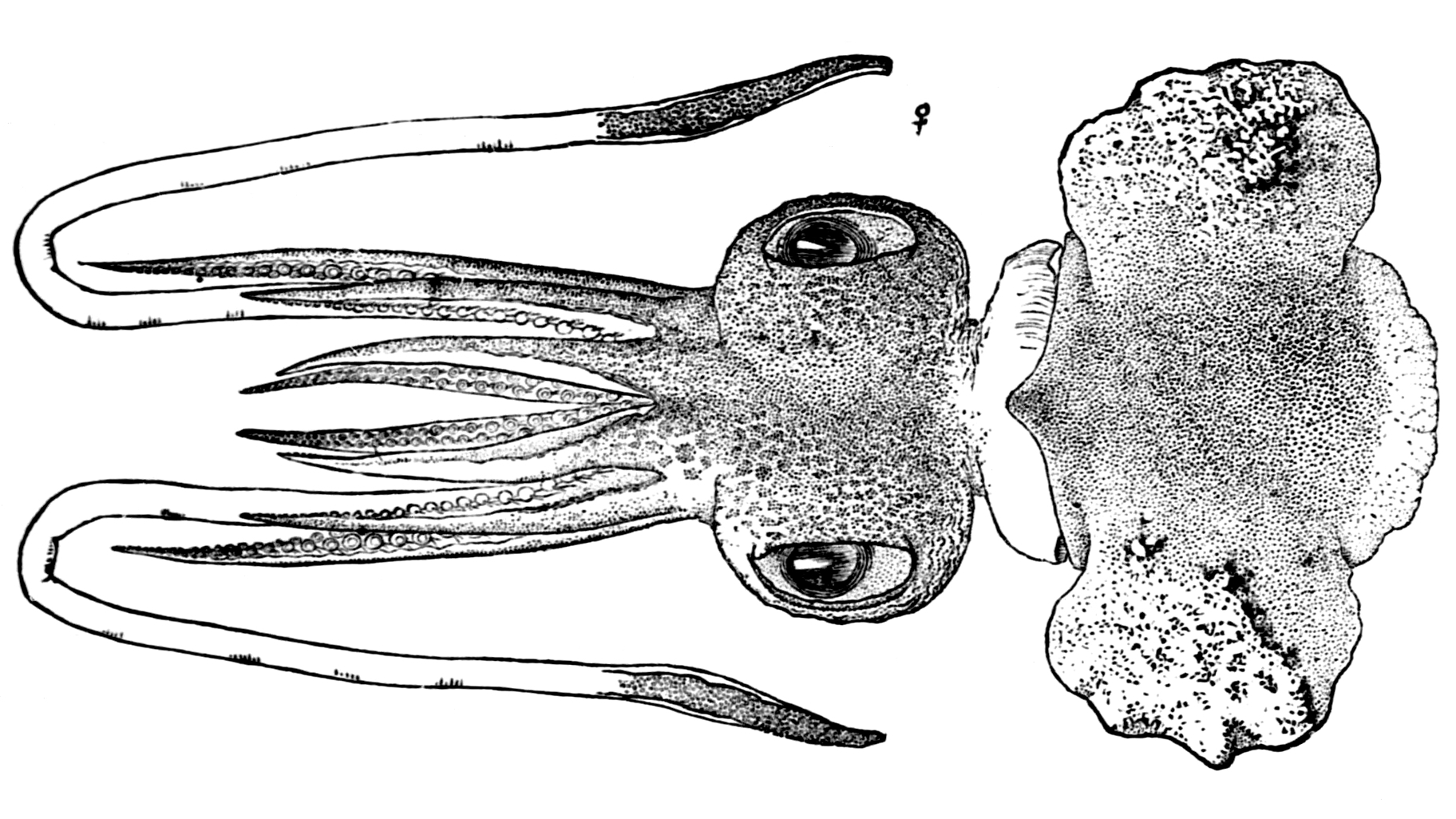

Conservation status
- Least Concern (IUCN 3.1)

Scientific classification
- Kingdom: Animalia
- Phylum: Mollusca
- Class: Cephalopoda
- Order: Sepiolida
- Family: Sepiolidae
- Subfamily: Rossiinae
- Genus: Rossia
- Species: R. megaptera

Binomial name
- Rossia megaptera Verrill, 1881

= Rossia megaptera =

Species of mollusc

Rossia megaptera, also known as the big-fin bobtail squid, is a species of bobtail squid native to the north-western Atlantic Ocean, specifically Davis Strait, western Greenland, and off New York, in Hudson Canyon. It lives at depths from 179 to 1,536 m. It can grow up to 41 mm in mantle length.

This type specimen was collected in the north-western Atlantic Ocean and is deposited at the Peabody Museum of Natural History in New Haven, Connecticut.
