= Rossia mollicella =

Conservation status
- Data Deficient (IUCN 3.1)

Scientific classification
- Kingdom: Animalia
- Phylum: Mollusca
- Class: Cephalopoda
- Order: Sepiolida
- Family: Sepiolidae
- Subfamily: Rossiinae
- Genus: Rossia
- Species: R. mollicella

Binomial name
- Rossia mollicella Sasaki, 1920

Species of mollusc

Rossia mollicella is a species of bobtail squid native to the western Pacific Ocean, south from Sendai Bay, Japan. It occurs on the outer continental shelf and in the upper bathyal zone. R. mollicella lives at depths from 729 to 805 m.

R. mollicella grows to approximately 36 mm or 40 mm in mantle length.

The type specimen was collected off Wakayama Prefecture, Japan. It is deposited at the National Museum of Natural History in Washington, D.C.
