= Semirossia tenera =

Conservation status
- Least Concern (IUCN 3.1)

Scientific classification
- Kingdom: Animalia
- Phylum: Mollusca
- Class: Cephalopoda
- Order: Sepiolida
- Family: Sepiolidae
- Subfamily: Rossiinae
- Genus: Semirossia
- Species: S. tenera

Binomial name
- Semirossia tenera (Verrill, 1880)

Synonyms
- Rossia tenera Verrill, 1880; Heteroteuthis tenera Verrill, 1880

Species of mollusc

Semirossia tenera, also known as the lesser bobtail squid, is a widespread species of bobtail squid native to the northwest Atlantic Ocean. Its natural range covers the eastern coast of North America, from the northern Gulf of Maine to the Gulf of Mexico and the Caribbean Sea. S. tenera is possibly also present in the southwest Atlantic, specifically off the coasts of Suriname, French Guiana, Brazil, and Uruguay, although the latter records are questionable.

S. tenera grows to 50 mm in mantle length (ML).

The type specimen was collected in the northwestern Atlantic Ocean. It is deposited at the Peabody Museum of Natural History in New Haven.

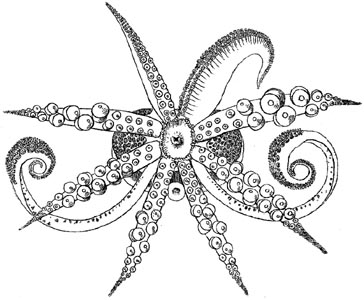
Oral view of S. tenera

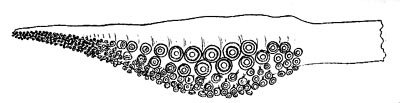
Tentacular club (ca. 11 mm long)
