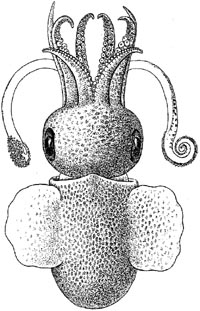
- Semirossia tenera

Scientific classification
- Kingdom: Animalia
- Phylum: Mollusca
- Class: Cephalopoda
- Order: Sepiolida
- Family: Sepiolidae
- Subfamily: Rossiinae
- Genus: Semirossia; Steenstrup, 1887

Type species
- Heteroteuthis tenera Verrill, 1880

Species
- See text.

Synonyms
- Rossia (Semirossia) Steenstrup, 1887

= Semirossia =

Genus of molluscs

Semirossia is a genus of bobtail squid comprising three species.

== Description ==
Semirossia appears very similar to other members of the Rossiinae subfamily, such as Rossia and Neorossia, from which it can be distinguished primarily by the presence of a functional black pouch connected to the photophores and by the fact that, in the male, only the left dorsal arm has been transformed into a hectocotylus.

Both S. equalis and S. tenera reach a mantle length of 50 mm.

== Species ==
- Semirossia equalis Voss, 1950, greater bobtail squid
- Semirossia patagonica Smith, 1881
- Semirossia tenera (Verrill, 1880), lesser bobtail squid
