= Austrorossia enigmatica =

Conservation status
- Data Deficient (IUCN 3.1)

Scientific classification
- Kingdom: Animalia
- Phylum: Mollusca
- Class: Cephalopoda
- Order: Sepiolida
- Family: Sepiolidae
- Subfamily: Rossiinae
- Genus: Austrorossia
- Species: A. enigmatica

Binomial name
- Austrorossia enigmatica (Robson, 1924)

Synonyms
- Rossia enigmatica Robson, 1924

Species of mollusc

Austrorossia enigmatica is a species of bobtail squid native to the south-eastern Atlantic Ocean; it occurs off the coast of southern Africa from Namibia to Cape Province, South Africa. It lives at depths from 276 to 400 m.

The type specimens measure up to 27 mm in mantle length.

The type locality of this species is off the South African coast. The type specimens are deposited at The Natural History Museum in London.

The validity of A. enigmatica has been questioned.
