= Rossia bullisi =

Conservation status
- Data Deficient (IUCN 3.1)

Scientific classification
- Kingdom: Animalia
- Phylum: Mollusca
- Class: Cephalopoda
- Order: Sepiolida
- Family: Sepiolidae
- Subfamily: Rossiinae
- Genus: Rossia
- Species: R. bullisi

Binomial name
- Rossia bullisi Voss, 1956

Synonyms
- Rossia (Allorossia) bullisi G. L. Voss, 1956

Species of mollusc

Rossia bullisi, also known as the Gulf bobtail squid, is a species of bobtail squid native to the tropical western Atlantic Ocean, specifically the northern Gulf of Mexico and Straits of Florida.

R. bullisi grows to 45 mm in mantle length.

The type specimen was collected in the Gulf of Mexico and is deposited at the National Museum of Natural History in Washington, D.C.
