= Austrorossia australis =

Conservation status
- Least Concern (IUCN 3.1)

Scientific classification
- Kingdom: Animalia
- Phylum: Mollusca
- Class: Cephalopoda
- Order: Sepiolida
- Family: Sepiolidae
- Genus: Austrorossia
- Species: A. australis

Binomial name
- Austrorossia australis Berry, 1918

Synonyms
- Rossia (Austrorossia) antillensis G. L. Voss, 1955; Rossia antillensis G. L. Voss, 1955

Species of bobtail squid

Austrorossia australis, often called the big bottom bobtail squid, is a species of bobtail squid in the family Sepiolidae. This species lives in sandy and muddy environments from 131 to 665 meters deep, in waters away from South Australia, New South Wales, Victoria, Tasmania, and Queensland.

== Description and spawning ==
Its coloring is pinkish to a purple brown coloring, the dorsal mantle is not fused with the head, and it has fins that are wide and short. It has a length of 3.4 cm for males, and 6.3 for females. Female A. australis lay their eggs in small clusters and then leave them unattended, and they may spawn several times in a year.

== Conservation ==
Its only threat is its being harvested, and it has minor fishery interests. It has no need for any conservation measures, and has been placed as "Least Concern" by the IUCN Red List.
