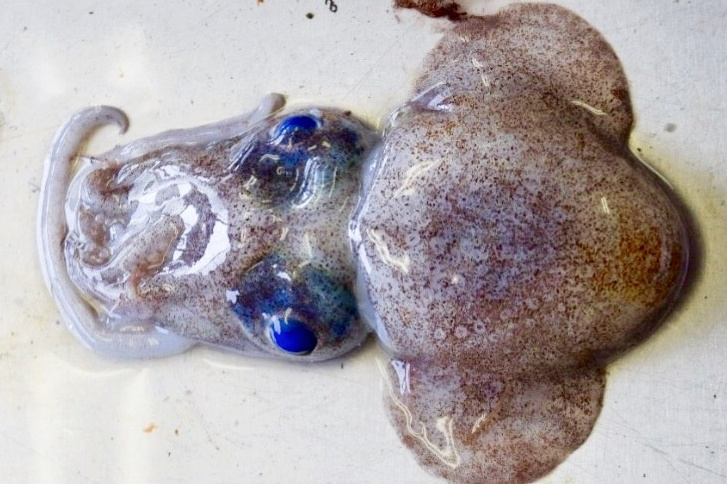

Conservation status
- Data Deficient (IUCN 3.1)

Scientific classification
- Kingdom: Animalia
- Phylum: Mollusca
- Class: Cephalopoda
- Order: Sepiolida
- Family: Sepiolidae
- Genus: Austrorossia
- Species: A. bipapillata

Binomial name
- Austrorossia bipapillata Sasaki, 1920

Synonyms
- Rossia bipapillata Sasaki, 1920

= Austrorossia bipapillata =

Species of squid

Austrorossia bipapillata, or the big-eyed bobtail squid, is a species of cuttlefish.

== Distribution ==
Austrorossia bipapillata is found in the Western Pacific and East China Sea in waters off Japan and the Philippines, at depths of zero to 240 meters. It has also been found in Taiwanese waters.
